= List of Reichstag deputies in the Third Reich (3rd electoral term) =

This is a list of Reichstag deputies in the Third Reich (3rd electoral term). The Reichstag of Nazi Germany existed from 1933 to 1945. Its 3rd electoral term began with the election of 29 March 1936 and lasted until the members were replaced in the election of 10 April 1938.

== Election ==
The 29 March 1936 parliamentary election was the first since the Saar had been incorporated into Nazi Germany on 1 March 1935, following the Saar plebiscite of 13 January 1935. The new territory was merged with electoral constituency 27, Palatinate, which was now renamed Palatinate–Saar. It also was the first German election held after enactment of the September 1935 Nuremberg Laws, which had removed citizenship rights, including the right to vote, from Jews and other ethnic minorities. Lastly, it was the first election after the recent military occupation of the Rhineland by Germany on 7 March 1936. The election took the form of a single-question referendum, asking voters whether they approved of both the military occupation and the list of candidates presented for the new Reichstag. According to the official election results, almost 44.5 million votes were cast (99.0% turnout), 98.8% of them for the electoral lists of the NSDAP.

== Sessions ==
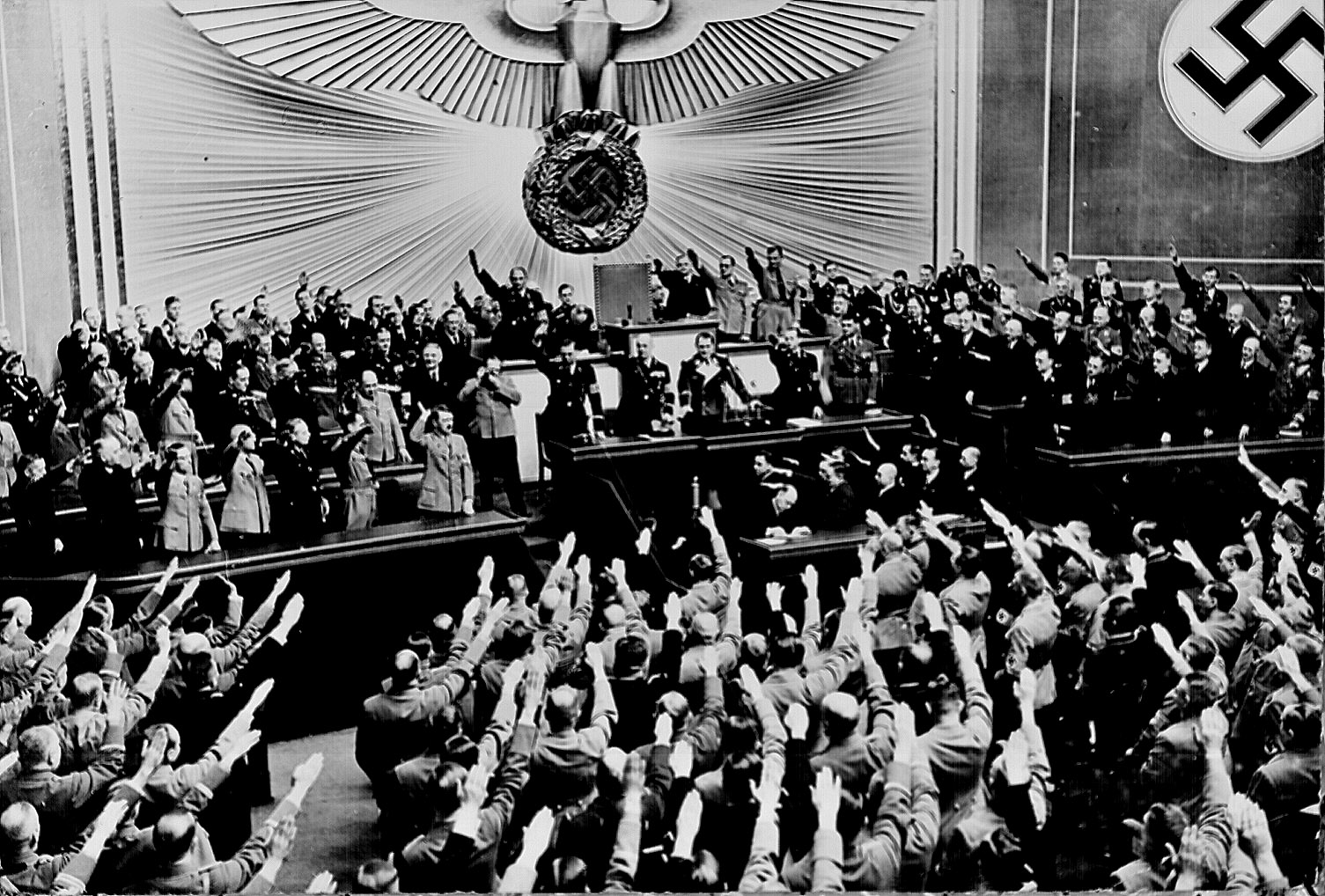
Adolf Hitler accepts an ovation after announcing the Anschluss with Austria at the third and final session of the Reichstag's' third electoral term on 18 March 1938

The Reichstag members of the 3rd electoral term met at the Kroll Opera House for only three sessions, the first being on 30 January 1937 and the last being on 18 March 1938. The only law passed by the Reichstag members during this time was the Law Extending the Enabling Act to 1 April 1941, which was approved in the first session on 30 January 1937.

Reichstag Sessions – 3rd Electoral Term
| Session | Date | Notable Action |
|---|---|---|
| 1 | 30 January 1937 | Extension of the Enabling Act |
| 2 | 20 February 1938 | Hitler speech vowing to protect German minorities in neighboring countries |
| 3 | 18 March 1938 | Hitler speech announcing the Anschluss with Austria and calling for a new Reichstag election |

== Presidium ==
The Reichstag Presidium, consisting of a president and three vice-presidents, was elected en bloc at the first session on 30 January 1937.

Presidium of the Reichstag
| Title | Incumbent |
|---|---|
| President | Hermann Göring |
| First Vice-president | Hanns Kerrl |
| Second Vice-president | Hermann Esser |
| Third Vice-president | Emil Georg von Stauss (Note: A "guest" of the Nazi Party faction.) |

== Members ==
The Law Against the Formation of Parties of 14 July 1933 established the Nazi Party (NSDAP) as the only legal political party. As a result, in all subsequent Reichstag terms, the only parliamentary faction allowed was the NSDAP. Members of the Reichstag who did not formally belong to the Nazi Party were listed as "guests" of the Nazi Party faction. There were only 19 such members in the Reichstag seated in the 3rd electoral term.

A total of 741 Reichstag deputies were elected on 29 March 1936. Eighteen deputies were elected from the national electoral list and the remainder from the 35 individual electoral constituencies. A listing of the members follows. Changes in Reichstag membership due to deaths, resignations or expulsions occurring up until 10 April 1938, and any resulting replacements, are annotated in the "Notes" column.

=== Reichswahlvorschlag (Reich Electoral List) ===
The Reichswahlvorschlag was allocated 18 seats.

| Name | Image | Birth | Death | Notes |
|---|---|---|---|---|
| Paul Bang | | 1879 | 1945 | |
| Heinrich Claß | | 1868 | 1943 | |
| Charles Edward, Duke of Saxe-Coburg and Gotha | | 1884 | 1954 | |
| Friedrich Everling | | 1891 | 1958 | |
| Oskar Farny | | 1891 | 1983 | |
| Ulrich Graf | | 1878 | 1950 | |
| Wolf-Heinrich Graf von Helldorff | | 1896 | 1944 | |
| Rudolf Hess | | 1894 | 1987 | |
| Alfred Hugenberg | | 1865 | 1951 | |
| Wilhelm Kube | | 1887 | 1943 | Replaced Karl von Wedel-Parlow, 26 November 1936 |
| Franz von Papen | | 1879 | 1969 | |
| Wilhelm Reinhard | | 1869 | 1955 | |
| Rudolf Schaper | | 1881 | 1945 | |
| Hermann Schmitz | | 1881 | 1960 | |
| Karl Friedrich Freiherr von Schorlemer | | 1886 | 1936 | Died, 27 September 1936 |
| Leo Schubert | | 1885 | 1968 | |
| Franz Seldte | | 1882 | 1947 | |
| Martin Spahn | | 1875 | 1945 | |
| Hans Vogel | | 1887 | 1955 | Replaced Karl Friedrich Freiherr von Schorlemer, 6 October 1936 |
| Karl von Wedel-Parlow | | 1873 | 1936 | Died, 23 November 1936 |

=== Constituency 1 (East Prussia) ===
East Prussia was allocated 23 seats.

| Name | Image | Birth | Death | Notes |
|---|---|---|---|---|
| Fritz Adam | | 1889 | unknown | Resigned, 19 November 1937 |
| Erich Behrendt | | 1904 | 1941 | |
| Willi Boeckmann | | 1910 | 1943 | |
| Erich Boetel | | 1904 | 1940 | |
| Paul Dargel | | 1903 | 1945 | Replaced Fritz Adam, 30 November 1937 |
| Ernst Duschön | | 1904 | 1981 | |
| Erich Fuchs | | 1894 | 1945 | |
| Ferdinand Grossherr | | 1898 | 1945 | |
| Erich Koch | | 1896 | 1986 | |
| Karl-Siegmund Litzmann | | 1893 | 1945 | |
| Waldemar Magunia | | 1902 | 1974 | |
| Erwin Nötzelmann | | 1907 | 1981 | |
| Ewald Oppermann | | 1896 | 1965 | |
| Hermann Paltinat | | 1905 | 1974 | |
| Ernst Penner | | 1883 | 1940 | |
| Alfred Preuss | | 1887 | 1947 | |
| Wilhelm Rediess | | 1900 | 1945 | |
| Erwin Rösener | | 1902 | 1946 | |
| Heinrich Schoene | | 1889 | 1957 | |
| Erich Spickschen | | 1897 | 1957 | |
| Heinrich von Sybel | | 1885 | 1969 | |
| Georg Usadel | | 1900 | 1941 | |
| Georg von Walthausen | | 1895 | 1978 | |
| Nikolaus Wehner | | 1901 | 1942 | |

=== Constituency 2 (Berlin West) ===
Berlin West was allocated 24 seats.

| Name | Image | Birth | Death | Notes |
|---|---|---|---|---|
| Karl Bombach | | 1891 | 1945 | |
| Otto Born | | 1892 | 1945 | |
| Otto Braß | | 1887 | 1945 | |
| Ralf Brockhausen | | 1898 | 1945 | |
| Johannes Engel | | 1894 | 1973 | |
| Hans Fabricius | | 1891 | 1945 | |
| Hans von Freyberg | | 1881 | 1945 | |
| Joseph Goebbels | | 1897 | 1945 | |
| Rüdiger Graf von der Goltz | | 1894 | 1976 | |
| Paul Harpe | | 1902 | 1983 | |
| Max Henze | | 1899 | 1951 | |
| Erich Hilgenfeldt | | 1897 | 1945 | |
| Paul Körner | | 1893 | 1957 | |
| Reinhard Neubert | | 1896 | 1945 | |
| Wilhelm Petzold | | 1898 | 1945 | |
| Ernst Graf zu Reventlow | | 1869 | 1943 | |
| Ludwig Schneider | | 1902 | 1944 | |
| Robert Schormann | | 1906 | 1962 | |
| Walter Schuhmann | | 1898 | 1956 | |
| Heinz Späing | | 1893 | 1946 | |
| Alfred Spangenberg | | 1897 | 1947 | |
| Alexander Freiherr von Wangenheim | | 1872 | 1959 | |
| Rudolf Weiß | | 1899 | 1945 | |
| Wilhelm Weiss | | 1892 | 1950 | |

=== Constituency 3 (Berlin East) ===
Berlin East was allocated 27 seats.

| Name | Image | Birth | Death | Notes |
|---|---|---|---|---|
| Andreas Bolek | | 1894 | 1945 | |
| Wilhelm Brückner | | 1884 | 1954 | |
| Kurt Daluege | | 1897 | 1946 | |
| Alfred Ernst | | 1895 | 1953 | |
| Hans Fink | | 1898 | 1945 | |
| Hugo Fischer | | 1902 | 1976 | |
| Waldemar Geyer | | 1882 | 1947 | |
| Artur Görlitzer | | 1893 | 1945 | |
| Karl Hanke | | 1903 | 1945 | |
| Hans Hinkel | | 1901 | 1960 | |
| Heinrich Hunke | | 1902 | 2000 | |
| Dietrich von Jagow | | 1892 | 1945 | |
| Károly Kampmann | | 1902 | 1945 | |
| Moritz Kraut | | 1905 | 1941 | |
| Hans Krebs | | 1888 | 1947 | |
| Paul Moder | | 1896 | 1942 | |
| Walter Ruppin | | 1885 | 1945 | |
| Gerhard Schach | | 1906 | 1945 | |
| Erich Schüler | | 1905 | 1987 | |
| Werner Schwarz | | 1902 | 1942 | |
| Paul Skoda | | 1901 | 1945 | |
| Karl Spiewok | | 1892 | 1951 | |
| Walter Stang | | 1895 | 1945 | |
| Franz von Stephani | | 1876 | 1939 | |
| Werner Wächter | | 1902 | 1946 | |
| Kurt Wege | | 1891 | 1947 | |
| Martin Wülfing | | 1899 | 1986 | |

=== Constituency 4 (Potsdam) ===
Potsdam was allocated 17 seats.

| Name | Image | Birth | Death | Notes |
|---|---|---|---|---|
| Wilhelm Decker | | 1899 | 1945 | |
| Hermann Göring | | 1893 | 1946 | |
| Richard Kackstein | | 1903 | 1966 | |
| Otto Kannengiesser | | 1893 | 1958 | |
| Hermann Kretzschmann | | 1886 | 1964 | Replaced Karl Litzmann, 22 June 1936 |
| Walter Kühle | | 1888 | 1972 | |
| Karl Litzmann | | 1850 | 1936 | Died, 28 May 1936 |
| Willi Luckner | | 1896 | 1975 | |
| August Wilhelm Prinz von Preussen | | 1887 | 1949 | |
| Theodor Adrian von Renteln | | 1897 | 1960 | |
| Joachim von Ribbentrop | | 1893 | 1946 | |
| Willi Ruckdeschel | | 1900 | 1974 | |
| Heinrich Schnee | | 1871 | 1949 | |
| Karl Schultz | | 1902 | 1977 | |
| Helmut Stellrecht | | 1898 | 1987 | |
| Fritz Tittmann | | 1898 | 1945 | |
| Martin Wendt | | 1886 | 1947 | |
| Heinz Wohlleben | | 1905 | 1972 | |

=== Constituency 5 (Frankfurt an der Oder) ===
Frankfurt an der Oder was allocated 18 seats.

| Name | Image | Birth | Death | Notes |
|---|---|---|---|---|
| Martin Bormann | | 1900 | 1945 | |
| Reinhard Bredow | | 1872 | 1945 | |
| Karl Friedrich | | 1897 | 1945 | Expelled, 12 July 1937 |
| Hans Grüneberg | | 1899 | 1991 | |
| Ernst Keller | | 1900 | 1945 | |
| Wolfgang Kraneck | | 1900 | 1943 | |
| Erich Krüger | | 1894 | 1945 | |
| Friedrich-Wilhelm Krüger | | 1894 | 1945 | |
| Wilhelm Kube | | 1887 | 1943 | Resigned, 10 August 1936 |
| Richard Kunze | | 1872 | 1945 | |
| Arno Manthey | | 1888 | 1941 | |
| Herybert Menzel | | 1906 | 1945 | |
| Paul Müller | | 1892 | 1963 | Replaced Wilhelm Kube, 22 August 1936 |
| Michael Münster | | 1901 | 1986 | |
| Emil Popp | | 1897 | 1955 | |
| Hans Richter | | 1905 | 1962 | |
| Karl Scholze | | 1902 | 1986 | Replaced Karl Friedrich, 23 July 1937 |
| Hartmut Stegemann | | 1908 | 1987 | |
| Martin Stumpf | | 1886 | 1974 | |
| Wilhelm Wigand | | 1895 | 1945 | |

=== Constituency 6 (Pomerania) ===
Pomerania was allocated 20 seats.

| Name | Image | Birth | Death | Notes |
|---|---|---|---|---|
| Gottfried Graf von Bismarck-Schönhausen | | 1901 | 1949 | |
| Willi Bloedorn | | 1887 | 1946 | |
| Walther von Corswant | | 1886 | 1942 | |
| Hans Friedrich | | 1886 | 1954 | |
| Otto Gohdes | | 1896 | 1945 | |
| Konstantin Hierl | | 1875 | 1955 | |
| Kurt Hintze | | 1901 | 1944 | |
| Paul Holthoff | | 1897 | 1967 | |
| Rudolf Jung | | 1882 | 1945 | |
| Artur Kauffmann | | 1897 | 1942 | Resigned, 30 June 1937 |
| Johannes Künzel | | 1899 | 1978 | |
| Kurt Lüdtke | | 1898 | 1991 | |
| Kurt Martius | | 1903 | 1970 | |
| Emil Mazuw | | 1900 | 1987 | |
| Karl Müller | | 1879 | 1944 | |
| Kuno Popp | | 1893 | 1973 | Replaced Artur Kauffmann, 1 July 1937 |
| Georg Poxleitner | | 1898 | 1964 | |
| Baldur von Schirach | | 1907 | 1974 | |
| Siegfried Schug | | 1898 | 1961 | |
| Robert Schulz | | 1900 | 1974 | |
| Franz Schwede-Coburg | | 1888 | 1960 | |

=== Constituency 7 (Breslau) ===
Breslau was allocated 20 seats.

| Name | Image | Birth | Death | Notes |
|---|---|---|---|---|
| Günther Arndt | | 1894 | 1975 | |
| Erich von dem Bach-Zelewski | | 1899 | 1972 | |
| Fritz Bracht | | 1899 | 1945 | |
| Axel von Freytagh-Loringhoven | | 1878 | 1942 | |
| Walter Gottschalk | | 1893 | 1952 | |
| Wilhelm von Grolman | | 1894 | 1985 | |
| Otto Herzog | | 1900 | 1945 | |
| Hans Huebenett | | 1896 | 1940 | |
| Ernst Jenke | | 1883 | 1950 | |
| Viktor Lutze | | 1890 | 1943 | |
| Fritz Marx | | 1900 | 1985 | |
| Julius Merz | | 1903 | unknown | |
| Karl Peschke | | 1882 | 1943 | |
| Johannes von Reibnitz | | 1882 | 1939 | |
| Heinrich-Christian Schäfer-Hansen | | 1901 | 1977 | |
| Albrecht Schmelt | | 1899 | 1945 | |
| Hermann Schneider | | 1872 | 1953 | |
| Josef Schönwälder | | 1897 | 1972 | |
| Richard Türk | | 1903 | 1984 | |
| Udo von Woyrsch | | 1895 | 1983 | |

=== Constituency 8 (Liegnitz) ===
Liegnitz was allocated 13 seats.

| Name | Image | Birth | Death | Notes |
|---|---|---|---|---|
| Hermann Behme | | 1900 | 1969 | |
| Karl Brückner | | 1904 | 1945 | |
| Emil Engler | | 1895 | unknown | |
| Hans Frank | | 1900 | 1946 | |
| Paul Franke | | 1892 | 1961 | |
| Karl Gerland | | 1905 | 1945 | |
| Wilhelm Heerde | | 1898 | 1991 | |
| Paul Hinkler | | 1892 | 1945 | Replaced Cuno Meyer, 20 July 1936 |
| Franz-Werner Jaenke | | 1905 | 1943 | |
| Konrad Jenzen | | 1882 | 1975 | |
| Rudolf Klieber | | 1900 | 1980 | |
| Cuno Meyer | | 1893 | 1981 | Expelled, 14 July 1936 |
| Alwin Uber | | 1884 | unknown | |
| Max Wockatz | | 1898 | 1947 | |

=== Constituency 9 (Oppeln) ===
Oppeln was allocated 14 seats.

| Name | Image | Birth | Death | Notes |
|---|---|---|---|---|
| Paul Binus | | 1901 | 1981 | |
| Max Fillusch | | 1896 | 1965 | |
| Walter Gross | | 1904 | 1945 | |
| Walter Hamfler | | 1907 | 1940 | Replaced Paul Hoenscher, 26 February 1937 |
| Alfred Hawellek | | 1905 | 1981 | |
| Hans von Helms | | 1899 | 1980 | |
| Heinrich Himmler | | 1900 | 1945 | |
| Paul Hoenscher | | 1887 | 1937 | Died, 16 February 1937 |
| Alfred Jonas | | 1903 | 1959 | |
| Lorenz Loewer | | 1900 | 1992 | |
| Ernst Mutz | | 1900 | unknown | |
| Richard Preiß | | 1902 | unknown | |
| Erwin Schramm | | 1887 | 1956 | |
| Johannes Schweter | | 1903 | 1985 | |
| Wilhelm Werner | | 1888 | 1945 | |

=== Constituency 10 (Magdeburg) ===
Magdeburg was allocated 19 seats.

| Name | Image | Birth | Death | Notes |
|---|---|---|---|---|
| Georg Ay | | 1900 | 1997 | |
| Joachim Albrecht Eggeling | | 1884 | 1945 | |
| Karl Fiedler | | 1897 | 1945 | |
| Alfred Freyberg | | 1892 | 1945 | |
| Walter Granzow | | 1887 | 1952 | |
| Udo Grosse | | 1896 | 1946 | |
| Fritz Härtl | | 1892 | 1974 | |
| Karl Janowsky | | 1903 | 1974 | |
| Adolf Kob | | 1885 | 1945 | |
| Kurt Kräft | | 1907 | 1977 | |
| Rudolf Krause | | 1894 | 1971 | |
| Otto Lehmann | | 1892 | 1973 | |
| Rudolf Michaelis | | 1902 | 1945 | |
| Hermann Müller | | 1900 | 1970 | |
| Christian Opdenhoff | | 1902 | 1975 | |
| Alexander Schrader | | 1887 | 1956 | |
| Wilhelm Trippler | | 1897 | 1974 | |
| Hans von Tschammer und Osten | | 1887 | 1943 | |
| Curt von Ulrich | | 1876 | 1946 | |

=== Constituency 11 (Merseburg) ===
Merseburg was allocated 16 seats.

| Name | Image | Birth | Death | Notes |
|---|---|---|---|---|
| Ludolf von Alvensleben | | 1901 | 1970 | |
| Heinrich Bachmann | | 1903 | 1945 | |
| Bruno Czarnowski | | 1902 | 1988 | |
| August Hallermann | | 1896 | 1966 | |
| Rudolf Jordan | | 1902 | 1988 | |
| Max Jüttner | | 1888 | 1963 | |
| Richard Reckewerth | | 1897 | 1970 | |
| Paul Schultze-Naumburg | | 1869 | 1949 | |
| Karl Simon | | 1885 | 1961 | |
| Franz Stöhr | | 1879 | 1938 | |
| Georg Tesche | | 1901 | 1989 | |
| Fritz Tiebel | | 1889 | 1945 | |
| Friedrich Uebelhoer | | 1893 | 1950 | |
| Hans Weinreich | | 1896 | 1963 | |
| Hans Wolkersdörfer | | 1893 | 1966 | |
| Joachim Wünning | | 1898 | 1944 | |

=== Constituency 12 (Thuringia) ===
Thuringia was allocated 26 seats.

| Name | Image | Birth | Death | Notes |
|---|---|---|---|---|
| Wilhelm Busch | | 1892 | 1968 | |
| Albert Derichsweiler | | 1909 | 1997 | |
| Alfred Eckart | | 1901 | 1940 | |
| Ernst Frenzel | | 1904 | 1978 | Replaced Karl Rompel, 10 March 1937 |
| Wilhelm Frick | | 1877 | 1946 | |
| Martin Groß | | 1901 | 1945 | |
| Kurt Günther | | 1896 | 1947 | |
| Herbert Haselwander | | 1910 | 1940 | |
| Paul Hennicke | | 1883 | 1967 | |
| Kurt Lasch | | 1886 | 1977 | |
| Willy Marschler | | 1893 | 1952 | |
| Franz Metzner | | 1895 | 1970 | |
| Walter Ortlepp | | 1900 | 1971 | |
| Paul Papenbroock | | 1894 | 1945 | |
| Fritz Paschold | | 1888 | 1972 | |
| Rudi Peuckert | | 1908 | 1946 | |
| Karl Pflomm | | 1886 | 1945 | |
| Eberhard Ponndorf | | 1997 | 1980 | |
| Otto Recknagel | | 1897 | 1983 | |
| Karl Reinhardt | | 1905 | 1968 | |
| Constantin Rembe | | 1868 | 1958 | |
| Karl Rompel | | 1888 | 1937 | Died, 17 February 1937 |
| Fritz Sauckel | | 1894 | 1946 | |
| Karl Schmückle | | 1895 | 1970 | |
| Heinrich Siekmeier | | 1903 | 1984 | |
| Friedrich Triebel | | 1888 | 1960 | |
| Oskar Trübenbach | | 1900 | 1992 | |

=== Constituency 13 (Schleswig-Holstein) ===
Schleswig-Holstein was allocated 18 seats.

| Name | Image | Birth | Death | Notes |
|---|---|---|---|---|
| Georg Ahlemann | | 1870 | 1945 | |
| Hans Beeck | | 1896 | 1983 | |
| Peter Börnsen | | 1896 | 1986 | |
| Alfred Frauenfeld | | 1898 | 1977 | |
| Roland Freisler | | 1893 | 1945 | |
| Erich Friedrich | | 1901 | 1971 | |
| Hans Gewecke | | 1906 | 1991 | |
| Hans Kummerfeldt | | 1887 | 1963 | |
| Hinrich Lohse | | 1896 | 1964 | |
| Martin Matthiessen | | 1901 | 1990 | |
| Joachim Meyer-Quade | | 1897 | 1939 | |
| Georg Rau | | 1892 | 1964 | |
| Ferdinand Schramm | | 1889 | 1964 | |
| Wilhelm Sieh | | 1892 | 1970 | |
| Jakob Sporrenberg | | 1902 | 1952 | |
| Werner Stiehr | | 1905 | 1982 | |
| Wilhelm Struve | | 1901 | 1982 | |
| Heinrich Wiese | | 1886 | 2000 | |

=== Constituency 14 (Weser-Ems) ===
Weser-Ems was allocated 17 seats.

| Name | Image | Birth | Death | Notes |
|---|---|---|---|---|
| Heinrich Bohnens | | 1891 | 1952 | |
| Richard Büchner | | 1897 | 1941 | |
| Bruno Dieckelmann | | 1897 | 1967 | |
| Erich Drescher | | 1894 | 1956 | |
| Paul Giesler | | 1895 | 1945 | |
| Jacques Groeneveld | | 1892 | 1983 | |
| Georg Joel | | 1898 | 1981 | |
| Manfred Freiherr von Killinger | | 1886 | 1944 | |
| Fritz Kleiner | | 1893 | 1974 | |
| Wilhelm Koppe | | 1886 | 1975 | |
| Gustav Nietfeld-Beckmann | | 1896 | 1961 | |
| Carl Röver | | 1889 | 1942 | |
| Josef Ständer | | 1894 | 1976 | |
| Kurt Thiele | | 1896 | 1969 | |
| Carl Voß | | 1897 | 1969 | |
| Paul Wegener | | 1908 | 1993 | |
| Fritz Wehmeier | | 1897 | 1945 | |

=== Constituency 15 (East Hanover) ===
East Hanover was allocated 12 seats.

| Name | Image | Birth | Death | Notes |
|---|---|---|---|---|
| Paul Brusch | | 1884 | unknown | |
| Willy Damson | | 1894 | 1944 | |
| Fritz Fröhlich | | 1901 | 1961 | Resigned, 16 July 1937 |
| Otto Gakenholz | | 1890 | 1973 | |
| Adolf Heincke | | 1901 | 1986 | |
| Adalbert Herwig | | 1901 | 1961 | |
| Paul Hocheisen | | 1870 | 1944 | |
| Friedrich Jeckeln | | 1895 | 1946 | |
| Friedrich-Wilhelm Lütt | | 1902 | 1973 | |
| Horst Raecke | | 1906 | 1941 | |
| Otto Telschow | | 1876 | 1945 | |
| Curt Wiebel | | 1876 | 1945 | Replaced Fritz Fröhlich, 27 July 1937 |
| Otto Wilkins | | 1907 | 1999 | |

=== Constituency 16 (South Hanover–Braunschweig) ===
South Hanover–Braunschweig was allocated 23 seats.

| Name | Image | Birth | Death | Notes |
|---|---|---|---|---|
| Reinhard Fäthe | | 1902 | 1978 | |
| Otto von Feldmann | | 1873 | 1945 | |
| Berthold Karwahne | | 1887 | 1957 | |
| Siegfried Kasche | | 1903 | 1947 | |
| Hanns Kerrl | | 1887 | 1941 | |
| Dietrich Klagges | | 1891 | 1971 | |
| Felix Kopprasch | | 1891 | 1946 | |
| Heinrich von Kozierowski | | 1889 | 1967 | |
| Werner Kropp | | 1899 | 1946 | |
| Hartmann Lauterbacher | | 1909 | 1988 | |
| Paul-Friedrich Nebelung | | 1900 | 1990 | |
| Franz Pfeffer von Salomon | | 1888 | 1968 | |
| Hartwig von Rheden | | 1885 | 1957 | |
| Bernhard Rust | | 1883 | 1945 | |
| Kurt Schmalz | | 1906 | 1964 | |
| Adolf Schmidt-Bodenstedt | | 1904 | 1981 | |
| Joseph Seydel | | 1887 | 1945 | |
| Heinrich Soest | | 1897 | 1962 | |
| Heinz Spangemacher | | 1885 | 1958 | |
| Georg Wagener | | 1898 | 1985 | |
| Werner Willikens | | 1893 | 1961 | |
| Ludwig Winter | | 1894 | 1956 | |
| Hermann Zapf | | 1886 | 1957 | |

=== Constituency 17 (Westphalia North) ===
Westphalia North was allocated 28 seats.

| Name | Image | Birth | Death | Notes |
|---|---|---|---|---|
| Herbert Barthel | | 1895 | 1945 | Replaced Wilhelm Rosenbaum, 11 March 1938 |
| Karl Dreier | | 1898 | 1974 | |
| Paul Faßbach | | 1897 | 1945 | |
| Curt Fischer | | 1901 | 1945 | |
| Paul Franke | | 1892 | 1961 | |
| Heinrich Göckenjan | | 1900 | 1986 | |
| Erich Hartmann | | 1896 | 1976 | |
| Karl Heidemann | | 1895 | 1975 | |
| August Heißmeyer | | 1897 | 1979 | |
| Friedrich Homann | | 1891 | 1937 | Died, 9 September 1937 |
| Rolf von Humann | | 1885 | 1961 | |
| Fritz Emil Irrgang | | 1890 | 1951 | |
| Karl Jackstien | | 1899 | 1943 | Replaced Friedrich Homann, 29 October 1937 |
| Bernd Freiherr von Kanne | | 1884 | 1967 | |
| Walter Knop | | 1906 | 1991 | |
| Albert Kost | | 1897 | 1947 | |
| Alfred Meyer | | 1891 | 1945 | |
| Hans-Joachim Riecke | | 1899 | 1986 | |
| Wilhelm Rosenbaum | | 1880 | 1938 | Died, 5 March 1938 |
| Arno Schickedanz | | 1892 | 1945 | |
| Paul Schmidt | | 1901 | 1977 | |
| Fritz Schmidt | | 1903 | 1943 | |
| Otto Schramme | | 1899 | 1941 | |
| Ferdinand Schürmann | | 1896 | 1966 | |
| Fritz Springorum | | 1886 | 1942 | |
| Peter Stangier | | 1898 | 1962 | |
| Walter Steinecke | | 1888 | 1975 | |
| Lothar Steuer | | 1893 | 1957 | |
| Hans Ummen | | 1894 | 1982 | |
| Adolf Wedderwille | | 1895 | 1947 | |

=== Constituency 18 (Westphalia South) ===
Westphalia South was allocated 28 seats.

| Name | Image | Birth | Death | Notes |
|---|---|---|---|---|
| Franz Bauer | | 1894 | 1966 | |
| Heinrich Bennecke | | 1902 | 1972 | |
| Arthur Böckenhauer | | 1899 | 1953 | |
| Philipp Bouhler | | 1899 | 1945 | |
| Hans-Gerhard Dedeke | | 1904 | 1975 | |
| Hein Diehl | | 1896 | 1964 | |
| Wilhelm Fischer | | 1906 | 1965 | |
| Wilhelm Habbes | | 1896 | 1948 | |
| Walter Heringlake | | 1901 | 1969 | |
| Karl Jung | | 1883 | 1965 | |
| Heinrich August Knickmann | | 1894 | 1941 | |
| Karl Krichbaum | | 1899 | 1971 | |
| Franz Land | | 1896 | 1974 | |
| Richard Manderbach | | 1889 | 1962 | |
| Wilhelm Meinberg | | 1898 | 1973 | |
| Albert Meister | | 1895 | 1942 | |
| Erhard Müller | | 1906 | 1969 | |
| Paul Nieder-Westermann | | 1892 | 1957 | |
| Franz Quadflieg | | 1900 | 1957 | |
| Ernst Riemenschneider | | 1900 | 1960 | |
| Carl Ludwig Schleich | | 1899 | 1944 | |
| Fritz Schleßmann | | 1900 | 1964 | |
| Ernst Stein | | 1906 | 1943 | |
| Emil Sturtz | | 1892 | 1945 | |
| Heinrich Teipel | | 1885 | 1945 | |
| Heinrich Vetter | | 1890 | 1969 | |
| Albert Vögler | | 1877 | 1945 | |
| Josef Wagner | | 1899 | 1945 | |

=== Constituency 19 (Hesse-Nassau) ===
Hesse-Nassau was allocated 28 seats.

| Name | Image | Birth | Death | Notes |
|---|---|---|---|---|
| Willy Becker | | 1890 | 1945 | |
| Adolf Beckerle | | 1902 | 1976 | |
| Rudolf Braun | | 1889 | 1975 | |
| Hans Burkhardt | | 1891 | 1948 | |
| Hans Dippel | | 1893 | 1945 | |
| Helmuth Friedrichs | | 1899 | 1945 | |
| Adalbert Gimbel | | 1898 | 1973 | |
| Theodor Habicht | | 1898 | 1944 | |
| Richard Hildebrandt | | 1897 | 1952 | |
| Hans Krawielitzki | | 1900 | 1992 | |
| Karl Linder | | 1900 | 1979 | |
| Johannes Lommel | | 1875 | 1939 | |
| Curt Ludwig | | 1902 | 1989 | |
| Carl Lüer | | 1897 | 1969 | |
| Hermann Neef | | 1904 | 1950 | |
| Hanns Oberlindober | | 1896 | 1949 | |
| Johannes Puth | | 1900 | 1957 | |
| Hans Saupert | | 1897 | 1966 | |
| Wilhelm Georg Schmidt | | 1900 | 1938 | |
| Fritz Schmidt | | 1899 | 1942 | |
| Walther Seidler | | 1897 | 1952 | |
| Jakob Sprenger | | 1884 | 1945 | |
| Willi Stöhr | | 1903 | unknown | |
| Wilhelm Thiele | | 1897 | 1990 | |
| Karl Vetter | | 1895 | 1964 | |
| Fritz Vielstich | | 1895 | 1965 | |
| Karl Weinrich | | 1887 | 1973 | |
| Franz Hermann Woweries | | 1908 | 1948 | |

=== Constituency 20 (Cologne–Aachen) ===
Cologne–Aachen was allocated 26 seats.

| Name | Image | Birth | Death | Notes |
|---|---|---|---|---|
| Walter Aldinger | | 1904 | 1945 | |
| Franz Binz | | 1896 | 1965 | |
| Werner Daitz | | 1884 | 1945 | |
| Carl Ludwig Doerr | | 1887 | 1954 | |
| Otto Dörrenberg | | 1888 | 1961 | |
| Kuno von Eltz-Rübenach | | 1904 | 1945 | |
| Otto Frowein | | 1899 | 1945 | |
| Oswald Fuchs | | 1892 | 1975 | |
| Josef Grohé | | 1902 | 1987 | |
| Heinrich Haake | | 1892 | 1945 | |
| Walter Hoevel | | 1894 | 1956 | |
| Curt Horst | | 1902 | 1990 | |
| Adolf Katz | | 1899 | 1980 | |
| Heinz Lampe | | 1896 | 1951 | |
| Robert Ley | | 1890 | 1945 | |
| Fritz Marrenbach | | 1896 | 1967 | |
| Richard Ohling | | 1908 | 1985 | |
| Hermann Reschny | | 1898 | 1971 | |
| Richard Schaller | | 1903 | 1972 | |
| Rudolf Schmeer | | 1905 | 1966 | |
| August Schirmer | | 1905 | 1948 | |
| Karl Georg Schmidt | | 1904 | 1940 | |
| Konrad Volm | | 1897 | 1958 | |
| Albert Wallwey | | 1897 | 1970 | |
| Hans Weisheit | | 1901 | 1954 | |
| Toni Winkelnkemper | | 1905 | 1968 | |

=== Constituency 21 (Koblenz–Trier) ===
Koblenz–Trier was allocated 14 seats.

| Name | Image | Birth | Death | Notes |
|---|---|---|---|---|
| Robert Claussen | | 1909 | 1941 | |
| Detlef Dern | | 1905 | 1941 | |
| Otto Dreyer | | 1903 | 1986 | |
| Rolf Karbach | | 1908 | 1992 | |
| Albert Müller | | 1895 | 1945 | |
| Eugen Plorin | | 1901 | 1943 | |
| Fritz Reckmann | | 1907 | 1984 | |
| Ernst Schmitt | | 1901 | 1972 | |
| Peter Schmitt | | 1901 | 1985 | |
| Gustav Simon | | 1900 | 1945 | |
| Otto Wagener | | 1888 | 1971 | |
| August Wetter | | 1890 | 1970 | |
| Paul Wipper | | 1906 | 1992 | |
| Carl Zenner | | 1899 | 1969 | |

=== Constituency 22 (Düsseldorf East) ===
Düsseldorf East was allocated 25 seats.

| Name | Image | Birth | Death | Notes |
|---|---|---|---|---|
| Peter Berns | | 1907 | 1941 | |
| Franz Bock | | 1905 | 1974 | |
| Wilhelm Börger | | 1896 | 1962 | |
| Erich Diestelkamp | | 1900 | 1983 | |
| Oskar Druschel | | 1904 | 1944 | |
| Rudolf Feick | | 1900 | 1945 | |
| Friedrich Karl Florian | | 1894 | 1975 | |
| Reinhard Heydrich | | 1904 | 1942 | |
| Heinrich Ilbertz | | 1891 | 1974 | |
| Heinz-Hugo John | | 1904 | 1944 | |
| Werner Keyßner | | 1903 | 1969 | |
| Ludwig Kraft | | 1900 | 1991 | |
| Heinrich Niem | | 1906 | 1944 | |
| Theodor Oppermann | | 1889 | 1945 | |
| Heinrich Pahlings | | 1904 | 1947 | |
| Wilhelm Schroeder | | 1898 | 1943 | |
| Wilhelm Schumann | | 1899 | unknown | |
| Ernst Schwarz | | 1904 | 1941 | |
| Heinrich Simon | | 1910 | 1979 | |
| Alfred Straßweg | | 1902 | 1997 | |
| Fritz Thyssen | | 1873 | 1951 | |
| Gotthard Urban | | 1905 | 1941 | |
| Karl Walter | | 1901 | 1957 | |
| Fritz Weitzel | | 1904 | 1940 | |
| Lucian Wysocki | | 1899 | 1964 | |

=== Constituency 23 (Düsseldorf West) ===
Düsseldorf West was allocated 21 seats.

| Name | Image | Birth | Death | Notes |
|---|---|---|---|---|
| Wilhelm Beyer | | 1885 | 1945 | |
| Karl Camphausen | | 1896 | 1962 | Replaced Friedrich Grüttgen, 20 January 1938 |
| Otto Dahlem | | 1891 | 1980 | |
| Richard Fiedler | | 1908 | 1974 | |
| Arnold Fischer | | 1892 | 1972 | |
| Hermann Freytag | | 1900 | 1962 | Resigned, 30 June 1937 |
| Friedrich Grimm | | 1888 | 1959 | |
| Friedrich Grüttgen | | 1906 | 1941 | Resigned, 28 December 1937 |
| Karl Gutenberger | | 1905 | 1961 | |
| Paul Hoffmann | | 1879 | 1949 | |
| Peter Hütgens | | 1891 | 1945 | Replaced Hermann Freytag, 30 June 1937 |
| Fritz Johlitz | | 1893 | 1974 | |
| Wilhelm Kattwinkel | | 1883 | 1953 | Replaced Friedrich Neven, February 1937 |
| Max Kolb | | 1889 | 1970 | |
| Wilhelm Loch | | 1892 | 1969 | |
| Hans Louis Ferdinand von Löwenstein zu Löwenstein | | 1874 | 1959 | |
| Friedrich Neven | | 1902 | 1971 | Resigned, 13 January 1937 |
| Friedrich Peppmüller | | 1892 | 1972 | |
| Alfred Rodenbücher | | 1900 | 1979 | |
| Emil Schultz | | 1899 | 1946 | |
| Josef Terboven | | 1898 | 1945 | |
| Heinrich Unger | | 1868 | 1939 | |
| Josias zu Waldeck und Pyrmont | | 1896 | 1967 | |
| Karl Zech | | 1892 | 1944 | |

=== Constituency 24 (Upper Bavaria–Swabia) ===
Upper Bavaria–Swabia was allocated 30 seats.

| Name | Image | Birth | Death | Notes |
|---|---|---|---|---|
| Wilhelm Aschka | | 1900 | 1967 | Replaced Franz Schmid, 14 December 1937 |
| Max Amann | | 1891 | 1957 | |
| Josef Bauer | | 1881 | 1958 | |
| Hans Baumann | | 1875 | 1951 | |
| Georg Biederer | | 1900 | 1967 | |
| Franz Buchner | | 1898 | 1967 | |
| Hanns Bunge | | 1898 | 1966 | |
| Rudolf Buttmann | | 1885 | 1947 | |
| Hans Dauser | | 1877 | 1969 | |
| Johann Deininger | | 1896 | 1973 | |
| Karl von Eberstein | | 1894 | 1979 | |
| Franz von Epp | | 1868 | 1947 | |
| Hermann Esser | | 1900 | 1981 | |
| Karl Fiehler | | 1895 | 1969 | |
| Kurt Frey | | 1902 | 1945 | |
| Wilhelm Helfer | | 1886 | 1954 | |
| Adolf Hitler | | 1889 | 1945 | |
| Emil Klein | | 1905 | 2010 | |
| Anton Mündler | | 1896 | 1945 | |
| Otto Nippold | | 1902 | 1940 | |
| Fritz Reinhardt | | 1895 | 1969 | |
| Josef Riggauer | | 1879 | 1952 | |
| Georg Schädler | | 1887 | 1971 | |
| Julius Schaub | | 1898 | 1967 | |
| Franz Schmid | | 1895 | 1937 | Died, 10 November 1937 |
| Franz Xaver Schwarz | | 1875 | 1947 | |
| Wilhelm Schwarz | | 1902 | 1975 | |
| Ludwig Siebert | | 1874 | 1942 | |
| Adolf Wagner | | 1890 | 1944 | |
| Karl Wahl | | 1882 | 1981 | |
| Karl Wenzl | | 1903 | 1942 | |

=== Constituency 25 (Lower Bavaria–Upper Palatinate) ===
Lower Bavaria––Upper Palatinate was allocated 14 seats.

| Name | Image | Birth | Death | Notes |
|---|---|---|---|---|
| Peter Bell | | 1889 | 1939 | |
| Josef Dietrich | | 1892 | 1966 | |
| Otto Erbersdobler | | 1895 | 1981 | |
| Franz Ganninger | | 1900 | 1945 | |
| Hermann Grassl | | 1896 | 1969 | |
| Hans Georg Hofmann | | 1873 | 1942 | |
| Adolf Hühnlein | | 1881 | 1942 | |
| Artur Kolb | | 1895 | 1945 | |
| Max Moosbauer | | 1892 | 1968 | |
| Arthur Rakobrandt | | 1878 | 1948 | |
| Ludwig Ruckdeschel | | 1907 | 1986 | |
| Hans Schiffmann | | 1889 | 1955 | |
| Franz Xaver Schlemmer | | 1895 | 1952 | |
| Fritz Wächtler | | 1891 | 1945 | |

=== Constituency 26 (Franconia) ===
Franconia was allocated 29 seats.

| Name | Image | Birth | Death | Notes |
|---|---|---|---|---|
| Johann Appler | | 1892 | 1978 | |
| Hugo Bruckmann | | 1863 | 1941 | |
| Albert Forster | | 1902 | 1952 | |
| Richard Gehrig | | 1897 | 1978 | |
| Karl Götz | | 1888 | 1954 | |
| Georg Gradl | | 1884 | 1950 | |
| August Greim | | 1895 | 1975 | |
| Wilhelm Grimm | | 1889 | 1944 | |
| Rudolf Gugel | | 1908 | 1945 | |
| Heinrich Hager | | 1893 | 1941 | |
| Willi Heer | | 1894 | 1961 | |
| Otto Hellmuth | | 1896 | 1968 | |
| Adolf Hergenröder | | 1896 | 1945 | |
| Karl Holz | | 1895 | 1945 | |
| Ernst Ittameier | | 1893 | 1948 | |
| Xaver Knaup | | 1893 | 1950 | |
| Hanns König | | 1904 | 1939 | |
| Willy Liebel | | 1897 | 1945 | |
| Karl Minnameyer | | 1891 | 1973 | |
| Johann Adam Mohr | | 1896 | 1982 | |
| Ludwig Pösl | | 1903 | 1945 | |
| Josef Alois Reinhart | | 1899 | 1977 | |
| Karl Schlumprecht | | 1901 | 1970 | |
| Ernst-Heinrich Schmauser | | 1890 | 1945 | |
| Fritz Schuberth | | 1897 | 1977 | |
| Georg Sperber | | 1897 | 1943 | |
| Julius Streicher | | 1885 | 1946 | |
| Philipp Wurzbacher | | 1898 | 1984 | |
| Lorenz Zahneisen | | 1897 | 1950 | |

=== Constituency 27 (Palatinate–Saar) ===
Palatinate–Saar was allocated 19 seats.

| Name | Image | Birth | Death | Notes |
|---|---|---|---|---|
| Wilhelm Bösing | | 1902 | 1949 | |
| Josef Bürckel | | 1895 | 1944 | |
| Hans Dietrich | | 1898 | 1945 | |
| Ernst Dürrfeld | | 1898 | 1945 | |
| Fritz Heß | | 1879 | 1938 | |
| Peter Kiefer | | 1884 | 1945 | |
| Karl Kleemann | | 1904 | 1969 | |
| Ernst Ludwig Leyser | | 1896 | 1973 | |
| Ludwig Liebel | | 1887 | 1962 | |
| Max Luyken | | 1885 | 1945 | |
| Heinrich Nietmann | | 1901 | 1961 | |
| Rudolf Röhrig | | 1903 | 1970 | |
| Willy Schmelcher | | 1894 | 1974 | |
| Franz Schubert | | 1905 | 1992 | |
| Fritz Schwitzgebel | | 1888 | 1957 | |
| Nikolaus Selzner | | 1899 | 1944 | |
| Gerhard Wagner | | 1888 | 1939 | |
| Julius Weber | | 1904 | 1942 | |
| Wilhelm Welter | | 1898 | 1966 | |

=== Constituency 28 (Dresden–Bautzen) ===
Dresden–Bautzen was allocated 22 seats.

| Name | Image | Birth | Death | Notes |
|---|---|---|---|---|
| Herbert Albrecht | | 1900 | 1945 | |
| Heinrich Bär | | 1905 | 1977 | |
| Theo Berkelmann | | 1894 | 1943 | |
| Helmut Böhme | | 1902 | 1945 | |
| Walter Burghardt | | 1885 | 1938 | |
| Walther Darré | | 1895 | 1953 | |
| Hermann Gerischer | | 1901 | 1990 | |
| Arthur Hugo Göpfert | | 1902 | 1986 | |
| Curt Haase | | 1897 | unknown | |
| Wilhelm Heuber | | 1898 | 1957 | |
| Eugen Holdingshausen | | 1890 | 1937 | Died, 10 July 1937 |
| Karl Horn | | 1898 | 1977 | |
| Hellmut Körner | | 1904 | 1966 | |
| Georg Müller | | 1892 | unknown | |
| Walter Neul | | 1899 | 1971 | |
| Willy Reichelt | | 1880 | 1946 | |
| Hans Reiter | | 1901 | 1973 | |
| Wilhelm Schepmann | | 1894 | 1970 | |
| Paul Unterstab | | 1895 | 1944 | |
| Hellmut Walter | | 1908 | 1991 | |
| Christian Weber | | 1883 | 1945 | |
| Ernst Wettengel | | 1903 | 1981 | Replaced Eugen Holdingshausen, 22 July 1937 |
| Ernst Zitzmann | | 1891 | unknown | |

=== Constituency 29 (Leipzig) ===
Leipzig was allocated 15 seats.

| Name | Image | Birth | Death | Notes |
|---|---|---|---|---|
| Walter Buch | | 1883 | 1949 | |
| Otto Dietrich | | 1897 | 1952 | |
| Hermann Groine | | 1897 | 1941 | |
| Karl Martin | | 1893 | 1974 | |
| Emil Maurice | | 1897 | 1972 | |
| Otto Naumann | | 1895 | 1965 | |
| Richard Owe | | 1889 | 1970 | |
| Paul Arthur Rabe | | 1903 | 1976 | |
| Paul Schaaf | | 1888 | 1979 | |
| Hans Seifert | | 1889 | 1948 | |
| Karl Sieber | | 1888 | 1946 | |
| Fritz Stollberg | | 1888 | 1948 | |
| Werner Studentkowski | | 1903 | 1951 | |
| Werner Vogelsang | | 1895 | 1947 | |
| Oskar Zschake-Papsdorf | | 1902 | 1944 | |

=== Constituency 30 (Chemnitz–Zwickau) ===
Chemnitz–Zwickau was allocated 21 seats.

| Name | Image | Birth | Death | Notes |
|---|---|---|---|---|
| Eduard Altenburg | | 1894 | 1943 | |
| Robert Bauer | | 1898 | 1965 | |
| Paul Drechsel | | 1888 | 1953 | |
| Theodor Eicke | | 1892 | 1943 | |
| Hans Georg Freund | | 1905 | 1942 | |
| Karl Fritsch | | 1901 | 1944 | |
| Willy Grothe | | 1886 | 1959 | |
| Alfons Hitzler | | 1897 | 1945 | |
| Erich Hofmann | | 1901 | 1984 | |
| Martin Jordan | | 1897 | 1945 | |
| Erich Kunz | | 1897 | 1939 | |
| Georg Lenk | | 1888 | 1946 | |
| Martin Mutschmann | | 1879 | 1947 | |
| Walter Oberhaidacher | | 1896 | 1945 | |
| Hellmut Peitsch | | 1906 | 1950 | |
| Franz Pillmayer | | 1897 | 1939 | |
| Fritz Preißler | | 1904 | 1945 | |
| Gerhard Rühle | | 1905 | 1949 | |
| Heinrich Strang | | 1896 | 1956 | |
| Martin Weis | | 1907 | 1970 | |
| Kurt Weisflog | | 1906 | 1942 | |

=== Constituency 31 (Württemberg) ===
Württemberg was allocated 31 seats.

| Name | Image | Birth | Death | Notes |
|---|---|---|---|---|
| Georg Altner | | 1901 | 1945 | |
| Alfred Arnold | | 1888 | 1960 | |
| Philipp Baetzner | | 1897 | 1961 | |
| Wilhelm Bisse | | 1881 | 1946 | |
| Ernst Wilhelm Bohle | | 1903 | 1960 | |
| Karl Dempel | | 1897 | 1967 | |
| Richard Drauz | | 1894 | 1946 | |
| Wilhelm Dreher | | 1892 | 1969 | |
| Daniel Hauer | | 1879 | 1945 | |
| Otto Hill | | 1894 | 1967 | Replaced Adolf Kling, 27 January 1938 |
| Ernst Huber | | 1902 | 1982 | |
| Fritz Kiehn | | 1885 | 1980 | |
| Emil Kiener | | 1900 | 1961 | |
| Adolf Kling | | 1893 | 1938 | Died, 19 January 1938 |
| Erwin Kraus | | 1894 | 1966 | |
| Eugen Maier | | 1899 | 1940 | |
| Josef Malzer | | 1902 | 1954 | |
| Wilhelm Murr | | 1888 | 1945 | |
| Gustav Robert Oexle | | 1889 | 1945 | |
| Alfred Pfaff | | 1872 | 1954 | |
| Hans-Adolf Prützmann | | 1901 | 1945 | |
| Eugen Graf von Quadt zu Wykradt und Isny | | 1887 | 1940 | |
| Bernhard Ruberg | | 1897 | 1945 | |
| Friedrich Schmidt | | 1902 | 1973 | |
| Albert Schüle | | 1890 | 1947 | |
| Friedrich Schulz | | 1897 | 1965 | |
| Hans Seibold | | 1904 | 1974 | |
| Franz Schenk Freiherr von Stauffenberg | | 1877 | 1950 | |
| Vinzenz Stehle | | 1901 | 1967 | |
| Erich Sundermann | | 1908 | 1993 | |
| Anton Vogt | | 1891 | 1976 | |
| Robert Zeller | | 1895 | 1966 | |

=== Constituency 32 (Baden) ===
Baden was allocated 26 seats.

| Name | Image | Birth | Death | Notes |
|---|---|---|---|---|
| Joseph Berchtold | | 1897 | 1962 | |
| Christoph Diehm | | 1892 | 1960 | |
| Fritz Engler-Füßlin | | 1891 | 1966 | |
| Albert Hackelsberger | | 1893 | 1940 | |
| Ludwig Huber | | 1889 | 1946 | |
| Friedhelm Kemper | | 1906 | 1990 | |
| Wilhelm Keppler | | 1882 | 1960 | |
| Walter Köhler | | 1897 | 1989 | |
| Herbert Kraft | | 1886 | 1946 | |
| August Kramer | | 1900 | 1979 | |
| Hanns Ludin | | 1905 | 1947 | |
| Franz Merk | | 1894 | 1945 | |
| Karl Offermann | | 1884 | 1956 | |
| Karl Pflaumer | | 1896 | 1971 | |
| Friedrich Plattner | | 1901 | 1960 | |
| Theo Rehm | | 1896 | 1970 | |
| Hermann Röhn | | 1902 | 1946 | |
| Albert Roth | | 1893 | 1952 | |
| Reinhold Roth | | 1900 | 1985 | |
| Robert Roth | | 1891 | 1975 | |
| Adalbert Ullmer | | 1896 | 1966 | |
| Otto Wacker | | 1900 | 1940 | |
| Robert Heinrich Wagner | | 1895 | 1946 | |
| Otto Wetzel | | 1905 | 1982 | |
| Curt Wittje | | 1905 | 1982 | |
| Willy Ziegler | | 1899 | 1942 | |

=== Constituency 33 (Hesse-Darmstadt) ===
Hesse-Darmstadt was allocated 15 seats.

| Name | Image | Birth | Death | Notes |
|---|---|---|---|---|
| Walter Heyse | | 1902 | 1980 | |
| Fritz Kern | | 1903 | 1945 | |
| Alfred Klostermann | | 1900 | 1945 | |
| Walther Freiherr von Lindenfels | | 1878 | 1938 | |
| Ludwig Münchmeyer | | 1885 | 1947 | |
| Heinrich Reiner | | 1892 | 1946 | |
| Friedrich Ringshausen | | 1880 | 1941 | |
| Heinrich Ritter | | 1891 | 1966 | |
| Alfred Rosenberg | | 1893 | 1946 | |
| Gustav Schmidt | | 1898 | 1972 | |
| Wilhelm Schwinn | | 1897 | 1967 | |
| Martin Seidel | | 1898 | 1945 | |
| Wilhelm Seipel | | 1903 | 1967 | |
| Richard Wagner | | 1902 | 1973 | |
| Karl Wolff | | 1900 | 1984 | |

=== Constituency 34 (Hamburg) ===
Hamburg was allocated 14 seats.

| Name | Image | Birth | Death | Notes |
|---|---|---|---|---|
| Hellmuth Becker | | 1902 | 1962 | |
| Friedrich Boschmann | | 1903 | 1965 | |
| Ludwig Fischer | | 1905 | 1947 | Replaced Walter Raeke, 30 November 1937 |
| Herbert Fust | | 1899 | 1974 | |
| Walter Gloy | | 1886 | 1953 | |
| Rudolf Habedank | | 1893 | 1969 | |
| Harry Henningsen | | 1895 | 1944 | |
| Karl Kaufmann | | 1900 | 1969 | |
| Werner Lorenz | | 1891 | 1974 | |
| Fritz Meyer | | 1881 | 1953 | |
| Carl Penzhorn | | 1866 | 1956 | |
| Arnold Petersen | | 1892 | 1953 | |
| Alfred Proksch | | 1891 | 1981 | |
| Walter Raeke | | 1878 | 1959 | Resigned, 9 October 1937 |
| Helmut Reinke | | 1897 | 1969 | |

=== Constituency 35 (Mecklenburg) ===
Mecklenburg was allocated 10 seats.

| Name | Image | Birth | Death | Notes |
|---|---|---|---|---|
| Werner Altendorf | | 1906 | 1945 | |
| Friedrich Hildebrandt | | 1898 | 1948 | |
| Gerd von Koerber | | 1906 | 1983 | |
| Ludwig Oldach | | 1888 | 1987 | |
| Erhard von Schmidt | | 1903 | 1994 | |
| Friedrich Graf von der Schulenburg | | 1865 | 1939 | |
| Karl Seemann | | 1886 | 1943 | |
| Emil Georg von Stauss | | 1877 | 1942 | |
| Walter Unger | | 1909 | 1999 | |
| Georg Währer | | 1893 | 1941 | |
