= Herbert Fust =

German Nazi SA general (1899–1974)

Führer, SA-Gruppe Hansa
- In office 21 January 1942 – 8 May 1945
- Preceded by: Siegfried Kasche
- Succeeded by: Position abolished

Führer, SA-Gruppe Kurpfalz
- In office 1 November 1937 – 31 January 1942

Führer, SA-Gruppe Hansa
- In office 15 September 1933 – 31 October 1937
- Succeeded by: Siegfried Kasche

Political positions
- 1942–1945: Hamburg State Councilor
- 1933–1945: Reichstag Deputy
- 1933–1937: Hamburg State Councilor
- 1932–1933: Mecklenburg Landtag Deputy

Personal details
- Born: 1 June 1899 Langenfelde, Pomerania, Kingdom of Prussia, German Empire
- Died: 11 November 1974 (aged 75) Buchholz in der Nordheide, Lower Saxony, West Germany
- Party: Nazi Party
- Other political affiliations: German Völkisch Freedom Party
- Occupation: Farmer and estate manager
- Civilian awards: Golden Party Badge; Brunswick Rally Badge

Military service
- Allegiance: German Empire; Weimar Republic; Nazi Germany
- Branch/service: Imperial German Army; Freikorps; German Army
- Years of service: 1917–1919; 1939–1942
- Rank: Vizefeldwebel; Oberleutnant
- Battles/wars: World War I World War II
- Military awards: Iron Cross, 1st and 2nd class Clasp to the Iron Cross, 2nd class Wound Badge

Herbert Robert Gerhard Fust (1 June 1899 – 11 November 1974) was a German agricultural estate manager who belonged to the Nazi Party and its paramilitary unit, the Sturmabteilung (SA). He rose to the rank of SA-Obergruppenführer and was the commander of all SA forces in Hamburg for several years under Nazi Germany. He was also a Nazi politician, serving in the Hamburg State Council, the state parliament of Mecklenburg-Schwerin and the national Reichstag. Troops under his command were actively involved in the Kristallnacht pogrom against the Jews in November 1938 and destroyed dozens of synagogues. Following the fall of the Nazi regime, he underwent denazification procedures and was brought up on charges by a German court in 1952 but was acquitted due to insufficient evidence.

== Early life ==
Fust was born into a large landowning family in Langenfelde (today, part of Glewitz), then in western Pomerania. He attended Volksschule in Glewitz and Demmin. He then attended the Gymnasium in Demmin for two years, followed by Realschule in Eldena until 1915. He received specialized training at the agricultural school in Eldena until 1917. Turning eighteen-years-old, he enlisted for service with the Imperial German Army as a one-year volunteer, and fought in the First World War from 1917 to 1918 in a machine gun company. He was promoted to Unteroffizier in 1918 and, from December 1918 to May 1919, he was a member of the Graf Kanitz battalion, a component of the Iron Brigade, a Freikorps unit fighting in Courland. He was discharged from the army as a Vizefeldwebel in May 1919, having earned the Iron Cross, 2nd class. He next completed an agricultural apprenticeship from 1920 to 1921, and then pursued additional agricultural studies for two semesters in Munich, while working as an estate manager and inspector. In 1927, he became self-employed as a farmer in Warrenzin.

== Political activity ==
Fust was a member of the German Völkisch Freedom Party from 1923 to 1927. On 15 December 1930, he applied for membership in the Nazi Party and was admitted on 1 December (membership number 385,173) at its Ortsgruppe (local group) in Levin, a neighborhood of Dargun. In January 1932, he attained a seat on the municipal assembly in Malchin, as well as becoming deputy municipal administrator of Warrenzin. From 6 June 1932 until it was dissolved on 14 October 1933, he sat as a member of the state Landtag (parliament) of the Free State of Mecklenburg-Schwerin. At the March 1933 parliamentary election, Fust was elected as a Reichstag deputy from electoral constituency 35 (Mecklenburg). He remained a Reichstag deputy until the fall of the Nazi regime, switching to represent constituency 34 (Hamburg) in March 1936 and constituency 27 (Palatinate) in April 1938.

== Service in the Sturmabteilung ==
Following his release from the army, Fust became a member of several paramilitary organizations, including the German veterans organization, Der Stahlhelm, from 1923 to 1924 and a local Frontbann unit from 1924 until 1927. He then joined another paramilitary group formed by the former Freikorps commander, Gerhard Roßbach, and remained with it until late 1930. On 15 November 1930, he joined the Sturmabteilung (SA), the Nazi Party's paramilitary unit. Assigned to SA-Sturm 5 in Gnoien, he advanced rapidly in the SA organization, from an SA-Scharführer to an SA-Truppführer to the SA-Sturmführer of SA-Sturm 245 in Dargun by February 1931. In June 1931, he was Führer of SA-Sturmbann (battalion) I of SA-Standarte 90 and, from September 1931 to February 1933, he was the Führer of SA-Standarte 90. On 17-18 October 1931, he participated in Adolf Hitler's SA mass rally in Braunschweig, for which he would later be awarded the Brunswick Rally Badge.

From 17 February 1933 until 1 July 1933, Fust was Führer of the SA-Untergruppe Mecklenburg, becoming a full-time SA officer on 1 March 1933. In May 1933, he also was named the Sonderskommissar (Special Commissioner) of the Supreme SA Leadership (OSAF) for Mecklenburg and Lübeck. On 1 July 1933, he was named Führer of SA-Brigade 11 in Mecklenburg. On 15 September 1933, he was transferred to become Führer of SA-Gruppe Hansa in Hamburg, a post that he retained until 31 October 1937. At the same time, he was the OSAF Special Commissioner in Hamburg until that position was eliminated in July 1934. He was also made part of the Hamburg government, as a Hamburg Staatsrat (State Councilor).

In February 1936, Fust's career was almost derailed by the conduct of his private life. He was charged by the Supreme Party Court with conduct damaging to the Party. Specifically, he was accused of attending wild, drunken parties, engaging in sexual affairs and publicly visiting bordellos. He was also accused of financial irregularities, involving the submission of inflated expenses. He could have been expelled from the Party, and only intervention on his behalf by the SA-Stabschef, Viktor Lutze, and the powerful Gauleiter of Hamburg, Karl Kaufmann, succeeded in reducing the punishment to a formal reprimand.

On 1 November 1937, Fust was transferred to the post of Führer of SA-Gruppe Kurpfalz, headquartered in Mannheim. On 9-10 November 1938, SA troops of SA-Brigade 50, a component of Fust's command posted in Starkenburg, participated in the Jewish pogrom known as Kristallnacht, and destroyed or partially destroyed 35 synagogues throughout the SA-Gruppe jurisdiction. The unit's commander, SA-Brigadeführer Karl Lucke, issued a report (Document 1721-PS) that was subsequently admitted in evidence at the Nuremberg trials and implicated Fust as issuing the order for the actions. It read in part: "… all the Jewish synagogues within the 50th Brigade are to be blown up or set on fire immediately. Neighboring houses occupied by Aryans are not to be damaged. The action is to be carried out in civilian clothes."

Fust retained his Mannheim command while serving in the military during the Second World War. On 30 January 1941, he was promoted to SA-Obergruppenführer. On 21 January 1942, he was transferred back to the post of Führer of SA-Gruppe Hansa in Hamburg, and again was given the office of Hamburg State Councilor. He retained these posts until Germany's surrender in May 1945.

=== SA ranks ===
SA ranks
Date	Rank
25 January 1931	SA-Truppführer
20 February 1931	SA-Sturmführer
24 June 1931	SA-Sturmbannführer
28 September 1931	SA-Standartenführer
15 April 1933	SA-Oberführer
24 December 1933	SA-Brigadeführer
20 April 1936	SA-Gruppenführer
30 January 1941	SA-Obergruppenführer

== War service and post-war life ==
On 26 August 1939, Fust was conscripted into the German Army and fought in the Battle of France and later with a panzer-pioneer unit in North Africa, where he was wounded in 1941. He was discharged from the army in 1942, as an Oberleutnant of reserves, after receiving the Clasp to the Iron Cross, 2nd class, the Iron Cross, 1st class and the Wound Badge.

After Germany's surrender in May 1945, Fust was interned until April 1948 as a British prisoner of war. He underwent denazification proceedings and was classified as Category IV (followers). He then worked as a businessman in Hamburg. Implicated in connection with the destruction of the synagogues during Kristallnacht, he was investigated and taken into custody between 21 March and 16 July 1949. He was charged by the Wiesbaden Regional Court, but was acquitted on 25 July 1952 because his guilt could not conclusively be proven due to a lack of evidence. Further details of Fust's life are not documented, and he died in 1974 at Buchholz in der Nordheide.

== Sources ==
- Campbell, Bruce (1998). The SA Generals and the Rise of Nazism. Lexington: University Press of Kentucky. ISBN 978-0-813-12047-8.
- Documents Concerning the Destruction of Synagogues by SA-Brigade 50 in the Avalon Project at Yale Law School's Lillian Goldman Law Library.
- Herbert Fust entry in the Rheinland-Pfälzische Personendatenbank.
- Information about Herbert Fust in the Reichstag database
- Lilla, Joachim: Fust, Herbert In: Staatsminister, leitende Verwaltungsbeamte und (NS-)Funktionsträger in Bayern 1918 bis 1945.
- Miller, Michael D.; Schulz, Andreas (2015). Leaders of the Storm Troops. Vol. 1. Solihull, England: Helion & Company. ISBN 978-1-909-98287-1.
- Stockhorst, Erich (1985). 5000 Köpfe: Wer War Was im 3. Reich. Arndt. p. 149. ISBN 978-3-887-41116-9.
