= Max Luyken =

German military officer and SA-Obergruppenführer

Commander, SA-Obergruppe II
- In office 1 July 1933 – 31 January 1934
- Leader: Ernst Röhm

SA Inspector-West
- In office 1 February 1934 – 30 June 1934
- Leader: Ernst Röhm

Chief, SA Education Main Office
- In office 1 November 1937 – 31 January 1942
- Leader: Viktor Lutze

Inspector for SA Education and Leadership Training
- In office 1 February 1942 – 30 April 1945
- Leader: Viktor Lutze; Wilhelm Schepmann

Additional positions
- 1934 – 1936: Commander, SA-Gruppe Kurpfalz
- 1937: Commandant, SA Reich Leadership School

Personal details
- Born: 16 October 1885 Wesel, Rhine Province, Kingdom of Prussia, German Empire
- Died: 30 April 1945 (aged 59) Steinhagen, Province of Pomerania, Free State of Prussia, Nazi Germany
- Cause of death: Killed in action
- Party: Nazi Party
- Profession: Military officer

Military service
- Allegiance: German Empire; Weimar Republic
- Branch/service: Imperial German Army; Reichswehr
- Years of service: 1906–1920
- Rank: Hauptmann
- Battles/wars: World War I Silesian Uprising
- Awards: Iron Cross, 1st and 2nd class

Max Otto Luyken (16 October 1885 – 30 April 1945) was a German military officer, Nazi Party politician and Obergruppenfuhrer in the Sturmabteilung (SA). He was killed in action during the closing days of the Second World War in Europe.

== Early life ==
Luyken, a merchant's son, was born in Wesel in 1885 and attended Volksschule and Gymnasium there and in Moers. In February 1906, he entered military service as an active duty Leutnant in the 31st (1st Lower Alsatian) Field Artillery Regiment. During the First World War he served as an officer on the General Staff from 1916, earning the Iron Cross, 1st and 2nd class and attaining the rank of Hauptmann. After the end of the war, he was involved with the Freikorps in the Silesian uprisings. After being discharged from the army in 1920, he joined the antisemitic paramilitary Organization Escherich, headed by Georg Escherich, where he became the regional leader in Saxony from 1920 to 1921. He also trained to become a merchant and subsequently earned his living as a trader before settling down as a farmer and landowner in the Wesel area.

== Nazi Party and SA career ==
Luyken joined the Nazi Party in the late 1920s and served as a Kreisleiter (County Leader). He was elected as a member of the Reichstag at the September 1930 election and served without interruption until his death in April 1945. He initially represented electoral constituency 23 (Düsseldorf West) until November 1933, then constituency 6 (Pomerania) until March 1936, then constituency 27 (Rheinpfalz-Saar) until April 1938 and, finally, constituency 34 (Hamburg) until April 1945. After the Nazi seizure of power, Luyken was made chairman of the Rhineland Chamber of Agriculture, a member of the Reich Farmers' Council and a Provincial Councilor of the Prussian Rhine Province. On 11 July 1933, he was named to the Prussian State Council by Prussian Minister president Hermann Göring.

Luyken was also a member of the Party's paramilitary branch, the Sturmabteilung (SA). As an SA-Oberführer, he headed the SA-Untergruppe in Essen from January 1931 to mid-April 1932 and then SA-Gruppe Niederrhein in Düsseldorf until the end of June 1933. He was promoted to SA-Gruppenführer on 15 October 1932 and, from 1 July 1933 to 31 January 1934, he was the commander of SA-Obergruppe II in Stettin, one of eight (later expanded to ten) such large regional commands. In that post he oversaw three SA-Gruppe: Hansa, Nordmark and Pomerania. From February until the end of June 1934, he was a member of the Supreme SA Leadership (Oberste SA-Führung, OSAF) as Inspector-West with his headquarters in Koblenz.

Luyken survived the Night of the Long Knives purge of the SA, but was removed from the central command structure. From July 1934 through December 1936 he headed the SA-Gruppe Kurpfalz, based in Mannheim and then became commandant of the SA-Reichsführerschule (Reich Leadership School) in Munich. On 9 November 1937, he was promoted to SA-Obergruppenführer. From 1 November 1937 to 31 January 1942, Luyken returned to the OSAF as chief of the Education Main Office and, from 1 February 1942 until his death, he was the inspector for SA Education and Leadership Training. He was also, from the beginning of September 1941, the OSAF liaison officer to the Reichsminister of Food and Agriculture (Walther Darré, followed by Herbert Backe). Luyken died on 30 April 1945, in a battle at Steinhagen in the last days of the war in Europe.

== Sources ==
- Campbell, Bruce (1998). The SA Generals and the Rise of Nazism. Lexington: University Press of Kentucky. ISBN 978-0-813-12047-8.
- Information about Max Luyken in the Reichstag database
- Lilla, Joachim (2005). Der Preußische Staatsrat 1921–1933: Ein biographisches Handbuch. Düsseldorf: Droste Verlag. ISBN 978-3-770-05271-4.
- Max Luyken biography with photo in Joachim Lilla: Ministers of State, Senior Administrative Officials and (NS) Officials in Bavaria from 1918 to 1945
- Max Luyken biography in the Rhineland-Palatinate personal database
