= Ludwig Fischer =

Nazi administrator (1905–1947)

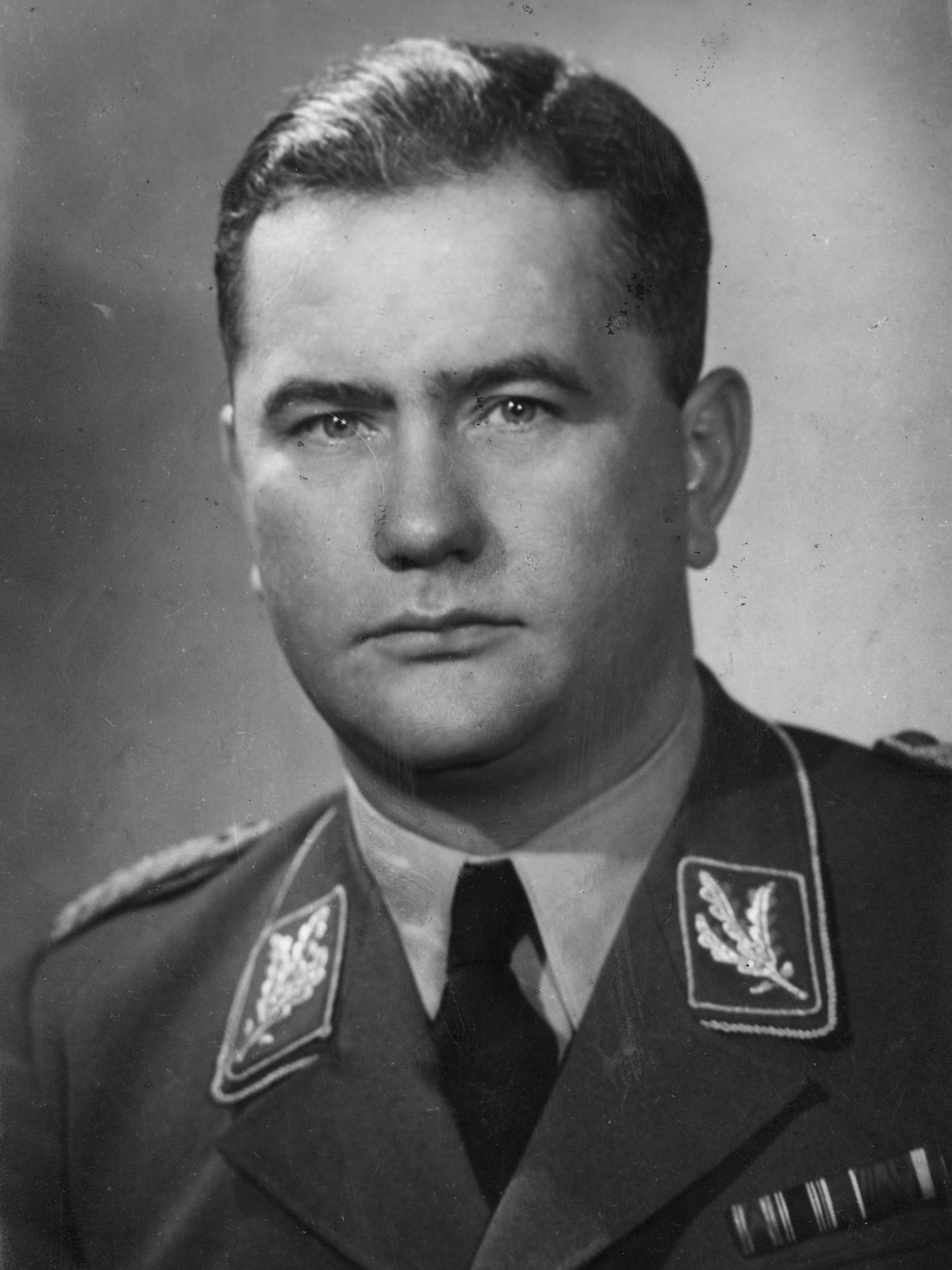
- Fischer, c. 1939–1941

Governor of the Warsaw District within the General Government
- In office September 1939 – January 1945

Personal details
- Born: 16 April 1905 Kaiserslautern, Rhineland-Palatinate, German Empire
- Died: 8 March 1947 (aged 41) Mokotów Prison, Warsaw, Polish People's Republic
- Cause of death: Execution by hanging
- Party: Nazi Party
- Education: Heidelberg University; Ludwig-Maximilians-Universität München; University of Würzburg; University of Erlangen
- Profession: Lawyer

Ludwig Fischer (16 April 1905 – 8 March 1947) was a German Nazi Party lawyer, politician and protégé of Hans Frank. During the Second World War, he served as the governor of the Warsaw District under Frank in the General Government where he was responsible for crimes against the Polish nation and Holocaust-related atrocities. After the end of the war, he was extradited to Poland and executed for war crimes.

== Early life and education ==
Born into a Catholic family in Kaiserslautern, Fischer was educated at the local Volksschule and Realschule. He studied law and political science at Heidelberg University, the Ludwig-Maximilians-Universität München, the University of Würzburg and the University of Erlangen. He obtained his doctorate of law in 1929. He was an expert speaker on legal issues and published articles in the area of Party law, co-editing the collection: "The Law of the NSDAP."

== Nazi Party career ==
Fischer was attracted to the Nazi movement at an early age and joined the Nazi Party (membership number 36,499) on 20 May 1926 while still a student. He joined the Sturmabteilung (SA) in 1929, eventually rising to the rank of SA-Gruppenführer in October 1940. As a lawyer, he served from 1931 as the chief of staff of the legal department under Hans Frank in the Party's Reichsleitung (national leadership) in Munich. In 1933, after the Nazi seizure of power, he obtained a government post as a Regierungsrat (government councilor). He was also a member of the presidium of Frank's Academy for German Law and of the National Socialist Association of Legal Professionals. In November 1937, he was appointed to the Reichstag from electoral constituency 34 (Hamburg), succeeding Walter Raeke who had resigned. At the April 1938 election, Fischer was returned to the Reichstag from electoral district 23 (Düsseldorf West), serving until the fall of the Nazi regime.

== Actions during the Nazi occupation of Poland ==
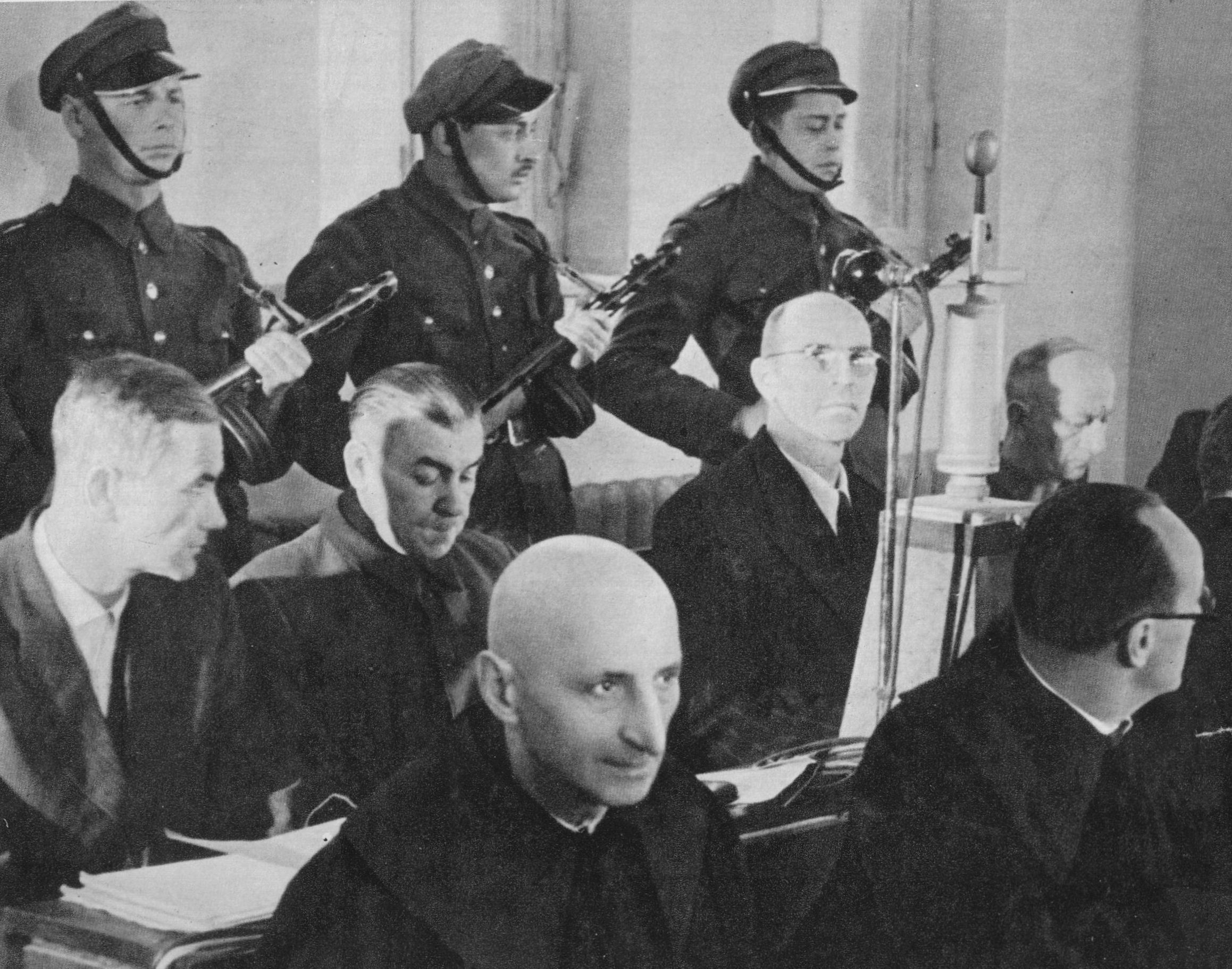
Fischer (second row, first from left) during his trial before the Supreme National Tribunal in Warsaw.

Germany invaded Poland in September 1939. On 24 October 1939 Fischer became Chief Administrator (and in 1941 Governor) of the Warsaw District in the occupied General Government (the area of Poland that Germany did not formally annex) under Governor-General Hans Frank. He held this position until the withdrawal of the German forces from Warsaw in January 1945.

Fischer was responsible for terror in the occupied city, including mass executions, slave-labor pogroms and the deportation of Poles and Polish Jews to the various German concentration camps. He also oversaw the establishment of the Warsaw Ghetto and issued many antisemitic laws, as well as participating in the bloody ghetto dissolution and inmate deportation. The Underground courts of the Polish resistance movement sentenced him to death for crimes against Polish citizens. His name appeared first on the list of "Operation Heads" —planned assassinations of Nazi personnel by the Polish Resistance. Before the Warsaw Uprising in 1944, his car was shot at in Operation Hunting (Polish: Akcja Polowanie) but Fischer survived.

After the failure of the Warsaw Uprising of August to October 1944, Fischer played an important role in Germany's planned destruction of Warsaw. He was also responsible for the poor conditions in the temporary transit camp on the western outskirts of Warsaw in Pruszków, which the Nazis set up to intern people expelled from the capital.

== Postwar trial and execution ==
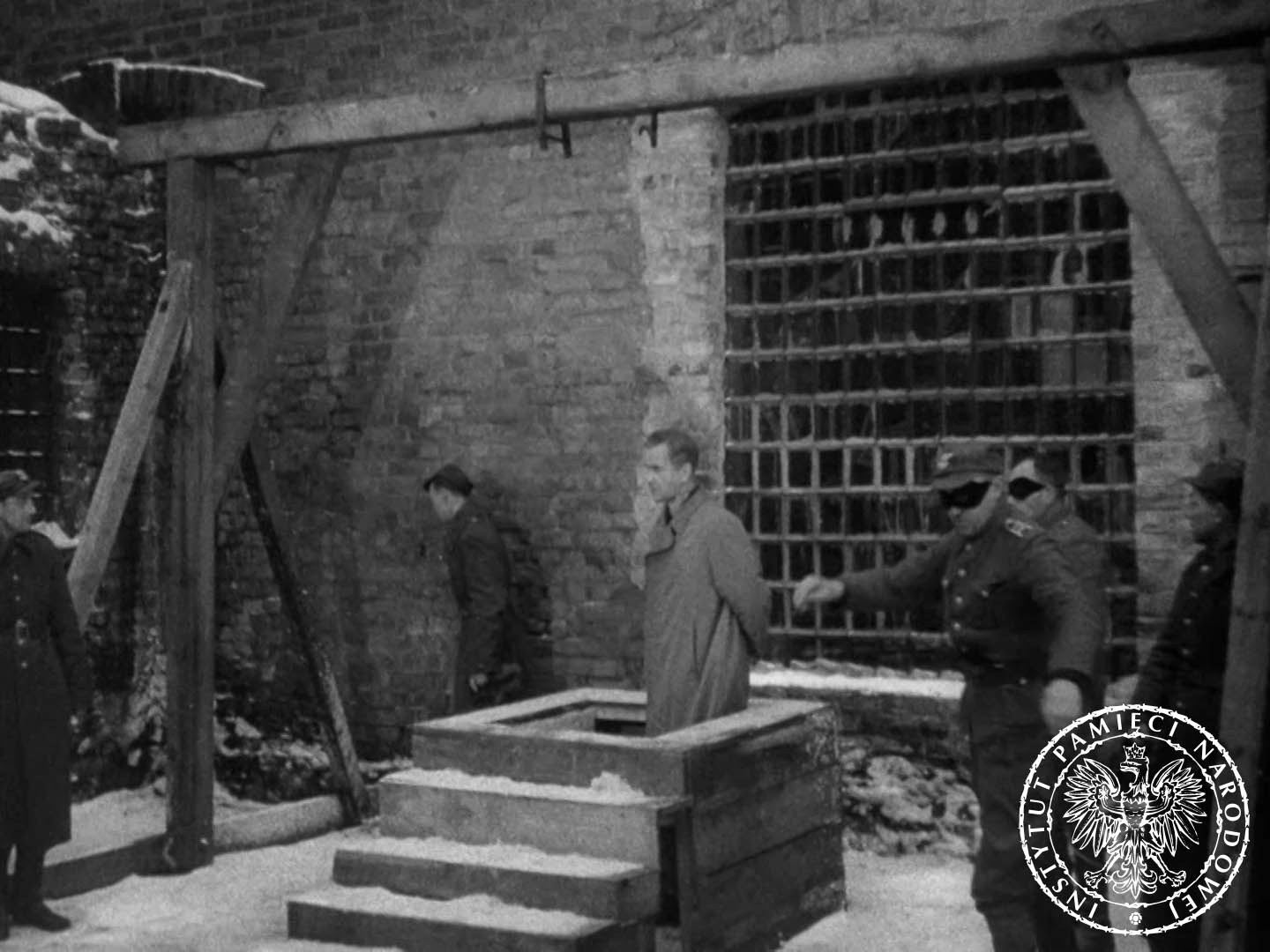
Execution of Fischer

After the war, Fischer hid in the town of Bad Neustadt an der Saale in Bavaria. He was arrested by U.S. soldiers on 10 May 1945. On 30 March 1946, Fischer was extradited to Poland, where he was put on trial before the Supreme National Tribunal for crimes against humanity. Treblinka and Warsaw Uprising survivor Jankiel Wiernik testified at his trial. On 3 March 1947, Fischer was sentenced to death, and he was executed by hanging in Warsaw's Mokotów Prison.
