= Siegfried Kasche =

German Nazi official (1903–1947)

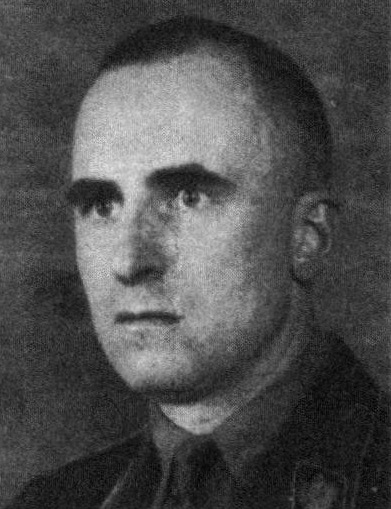
- Kasche in 1938

German Ambassador to Croatia
- In office 15 April 1941 – 8 May 1945
- Preceded by: Hermann Neubacher
- Succeeded by: Office abolished

SA Representative for New Farming Settlements and Ethnicity Issues
- In office September 1938 – 15 April 1941
- Preceded by: Office created
- Succeeded by: Office left vacant

Fuhrer, SA-Gruppe Hansa
- In office 1 November 1937 – 21 January 1942
- Preceded by: Herbert Fust
- Succeeded by: Herbert Fust

Fuhrer, SA-Gruppe Niedersachsen
- In office July 1934 – 31 October 1937
- Preceded by: Otto Schramme
- Succeeded by: Arthur Böckenhauer

Additional positions
- 1930—1945: Reichstag Deputy

Personal details
- Born: 18 June 1903 Strausberg, Berlin, German Empire
- Died: 7 June 1947 (aged 43) Zagreb, Croatia, FPR Yugoslavia
- Cause of death: Execution by hanging
- Party: Nazi Party
- Education: Preußische Hauptkadettenanstalt
- Occupation: Politician, diplomat
- Civilian awards: Golden Party Badge

Military service
- Allegiance: Weimar Republic; Nazi Germany
- Branch/service: Freikorps; German Army
- Years of service: 1919–1920; 1939–1941
- Battles/wars: Invasion of Poland; Battle of France
- Military awards: Iron Cross, 1st and 2nd class Baltic Cross

Siegfried Kasche (18 June 1903 – 7 June 1947) was a German Nazi Party politician who served as the ambassador of Nazi Germany to the Independent State of Croatia where he was complicit in the atrocities committed against Serbs, Jews and other ethnic groups. He was also an SA-Obergruppenführer in the Sturmabteilung (SA), a Nazi paramilitary organization. He headed the SA agricultural settlement program to replace native populations in the occupied Polish territories with SA settlers. Kasche was proposed as the head of the Reichskommissariat Moskowien but, due to German military reversals, the Reichskommissariat was never established. Following the end of the Second World War, he was put on trial in Croatia, convicted of war crimes and hanged.

== Early life ==
Kasche was born in Strausberg, the son of a physician. After graduating from the Victoria Gymnasium (today, the Helmholtz-Gymnasium Potsdam), he attended cadet school in Potsdam and the Preußische Hauptkadettenanstalt military academy in Lichterfelde. He served in the Freikorps between 1919 and 1920 as a company commander, seeing action in Berlin and the Baltic states, for which he was awarded the Baltic Cross. Leaving the military, he was employed in various fields, including agriculture, banking, the glass industry and the textile trade. Throughout this time, he was involved with right-wing nationalist military associations (Wehrverbände).

== Nazi Party and SA career ==
Kasche joined the Sturmabteilung (SA) in 1925 and the Nazi Party on 9 January 1926. As an early Party member, he later would be awarded the Golden Party Badge. Between 1928 and 1931, Kasche held posts as SA-Führer, Bezirksleiter and Deputy Gauleiter in Gau Ostmark under Wilhelm Kube. In November 1929, he was elected to the city council in Sorau (today, Żary) and to the Kreistag (district council), serving as the Nazi faction leader in both bodies. In September 1930, he was elected to the Reichstag from electoral constituency 5 (Frankfurt on the Oder). He would retain a Reichstag seat until the fall of the Nazi regime, switching to constituency 16 (South Hanover–Braunschweig) at the 1936 election and constituency 34 (Hamburg) at the 1938 election.

Attaining the rank of SA-Gruppenführer in 1932, Kasche headed the SA-Gruppe Pommern and later advanced to the leadership of SA-Obergruppe II with headquarters in Stettin (today, Szczecin). At the end of June 1934, Kasche was one of the SA senior general officers to survive the Night of the Long Knives, when SA-Stabschef Ernst Röhm and many of his close associates were murdered. Hermann Göring, Prussian Minister-president and Reichstag president, was coordinating the murders in Berlin. Kasche survived execution by pleading his case with Göring who arranged for him to be left unharmed. Kasche served as the Führer of SA-Gruppe Niedersachsen in Hanover from 1934 to 1937. On 9 November 1936, he was promoted to SA-Obergruppenführer and, in November 1937, he was transferred to become the Führer of SA-Gruppe Hansa, headquartered in Hamburg. He replaced SA-Gruppenführer Herbert Fust in this post.

In September 1938, SA-Stabschef Viktor Lutze appointed Kasche as the SA Representative for New Farming Settlements and Ethnicity Issues. He was charged with furnishing prospective settlers from the SA ranks to take up new farming settlements in eastern Germany. Recruits were required to be at least twenty-five years old, married and of Aryan descent. It was intended that they would provide ideological and political homogeneity in the new settlements to act as a bulwark against the neighboring states. The outbreak of the Second World War and the quest for Lebensraum provided an opportunity to expand the program into territory conquered from Poland. Previously Polish-owned farms were expropriated, and it is estimated that nearly 15,000 such farms were seized in formerly Polish sections of Upper Silesia alone.

Unfortunately for Kasche, on 7 October 1939, Adolf Hitler appointed Reichsführer-SS Heinrich Himmler as Reich Commissioner for the Consolidation of German Nationhood to coordinate the return, repatriation, and settlement of ethnic Germans in the conquered territories. Kasche lacked the power to challenge Himmler over their competing plans and, although he attempted to retain a role for continuing to resettle SA men from Germany proper, Himmler successfully marginalized the SA agricultural settlement program. Combined with a lack of interested SA recruits (only 2,150 volunteers by April 1941 as opposed to the estimated 45,000 needed), this spelled failure for Kasche's program. At the time he left the post for his next assignment, no successor was immediately appointed and the SA eventually gave up on any direct role in the settlement project.

== Wartime service and ambassador to Croatia ==
On the outbreak of the war in September 1939, Kasche entered the Wehrmacht as an officer and participated in the Polish and French campaigns. He was wounded in March 1940, and he was awarded the Iron Cross, 1st and 2nd class for his military service.

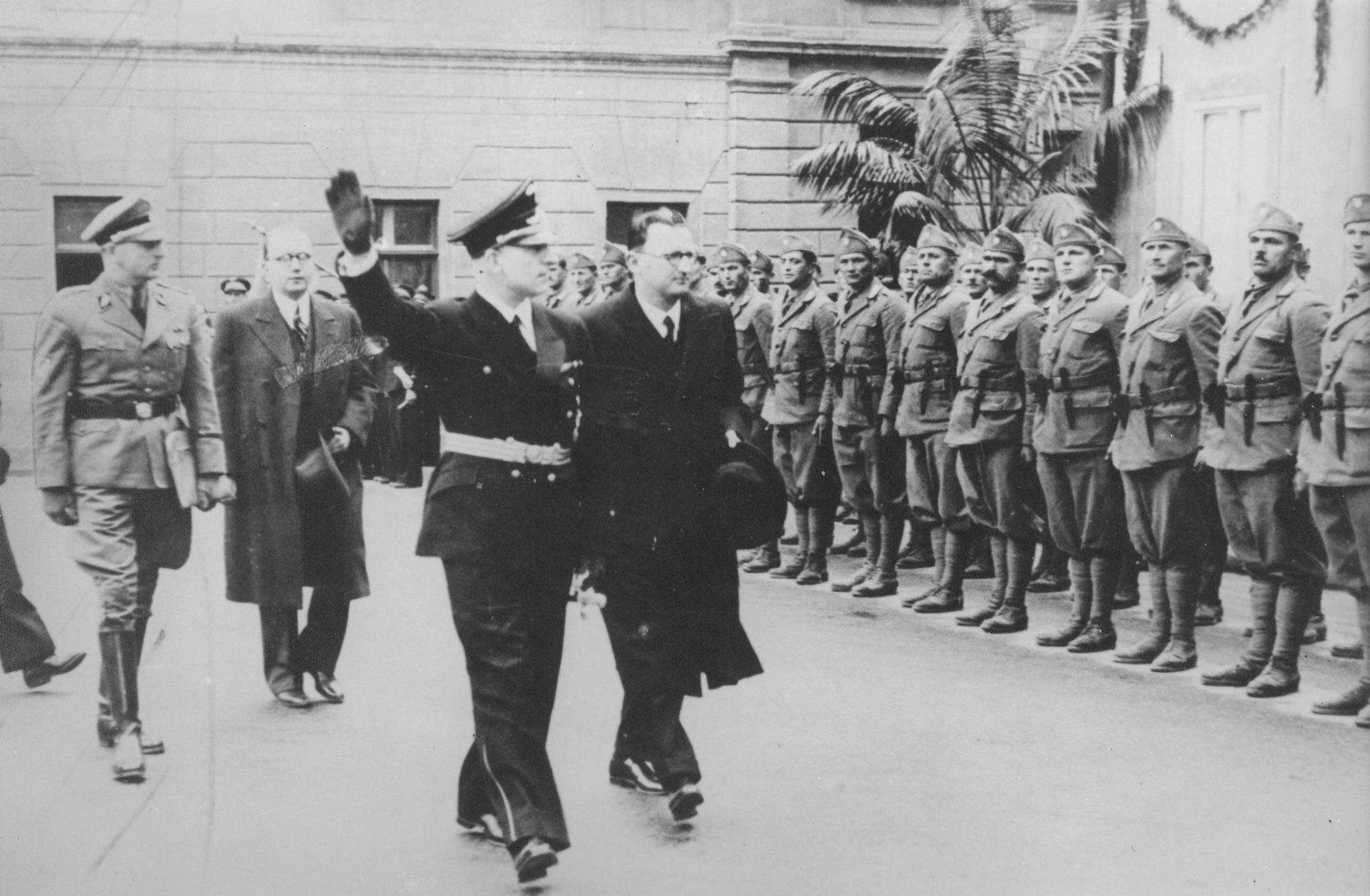
Kasche (left) accompanied by Croatia's Foreign Minister Mladen Lorković in Zagreb

In February 1941, Kasche was assigned to the Foreign Ministry for diplomatic service. On 15 April 1941, when Germany recognized the Independent State of Croatia, Kasche was named ambassador, arriving in Zagreb on 20 April. He was one of a handful of SA officers appointed to diplomatic posts in central and southeastern Europe by Foreign Minister Joachim von Ribbentrop in an effort to limit Himmler's influence in the area. For his part, Kasche had never forgiven the SS for its involvement in the Röhm purge. However, he had no diplomatic training or background and, according to one German observer in Zagreb, "he barely knew where Croatia was". Kasche also retained his post as SA Fuhrer in Hamburg until 21 January 1942, when Herbert Fust returned to the position. Unlike many other German officials who regarded the NDH (Nezavisna Država Hrvatsk-Independent State of Croatia) as something of a joke, Kasche supported the NDH fully.

At a meeting of the Nazi leadership at Hitler's Wolf's Lair headquarters on 16 July 1941, Kasche was designated as the future Reichskommissar of the planned Nazi occupation regime to be called Moskau, which was to comprise the main territories of central and northern Russia up to the Ural Mountains. German military reversals on the eastern front during the 1941–42 winter that culminated in the failure to take Moscow prevented its establishment, leaving the project in the planning stages.

== War crimes ==
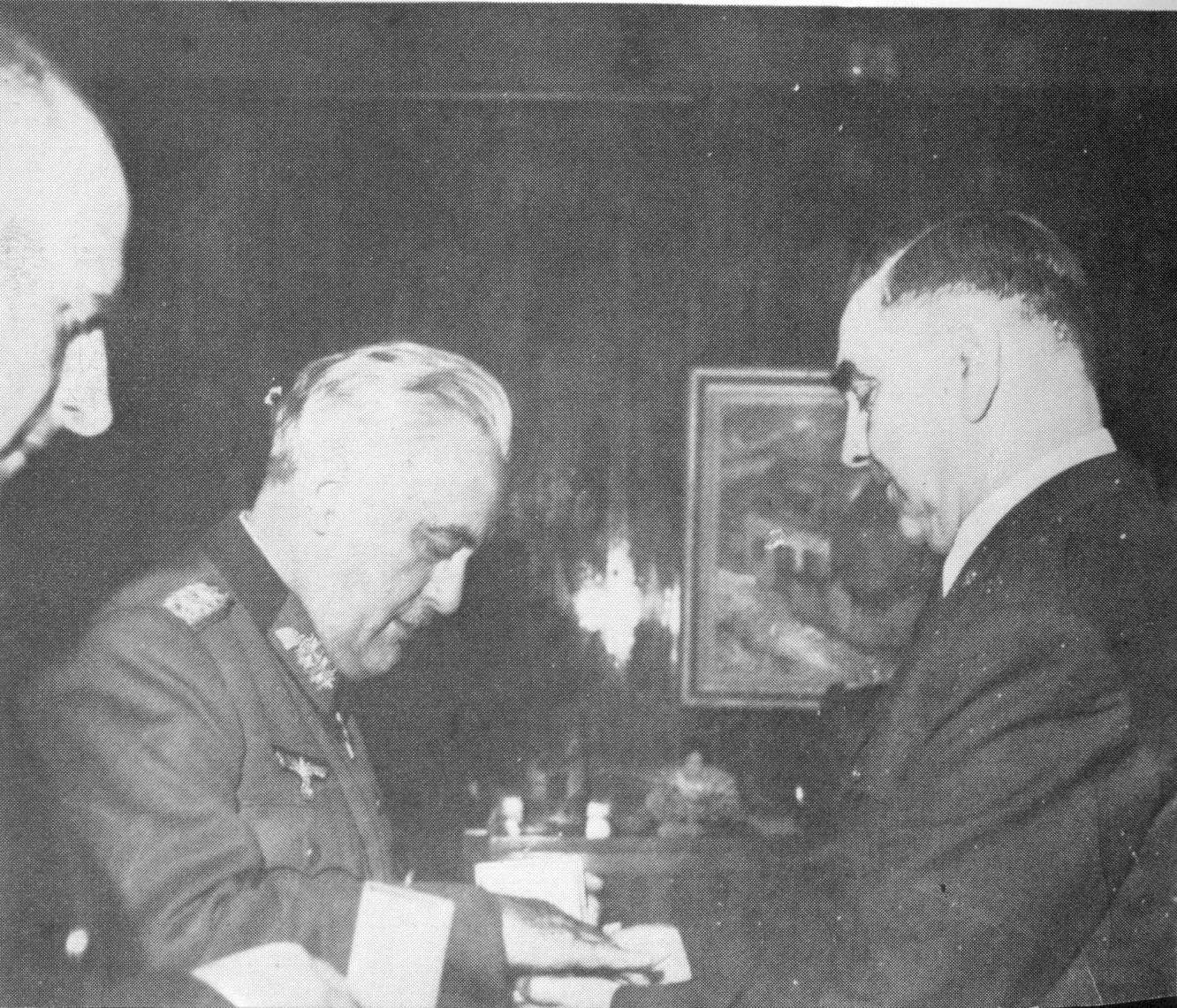
Ante Pavelić, Edmund Glaise von Horstenau and Kasche in 1944

In Croatia, Kasche advocated a joint effort of the Axis forces against the Yugoslav partisans. On 4 June 1941, Kasche led a meeting of German and Croatian officials who agreed on a resettlement scheme that would ultimately affect half a million persons in four countries. However, it proved impossible to resettle nearly one-third of the population of this multi-ethnic state. Nonetheless, during the war many Serbs were deported from Croatia — some to Serbia and others to Germany. The order to deport the Serbs did not originate with the leaders of Croatia, who preferred to forcibly convert, kill, or detain as slave labor those Serbs within its boundaries. According to the Nuremberg Tribunal, the order originated from the conference held in the German Legation presided over by Kasche, "at which it was decided forcibly to evacuate the Slovenes to Croatia and Serbia and the Serbs from Croatia into Serbia. This decision results from a telegram from the Ministry of Foreign Affairs, Number 389, dated 31 May 1941". The Ustaše regime was fanatically anti-Semitic and in its first year of existence extending from April 1941 to April 1942 more than half of the Jews living in the NDH were exterminated, leading to the SS "Jew experts" to note that there was little for them to do in Croatia as the Ustaše had already killed most of the local Jews.

The Croatian dictator Ante Pavelić and his Ustaše Croatian Revolutionary Movement were pledged to eliminate non-Croat influence in the new state, particularly that of Serbs and Jews. Since Kasche was very supportive of Pavelić and the Ustaše, he justified their policy and actions to the extent that Adolf Hitler called him a "greater Croat than Pavelić". The expulsions triggered massive Serb resistance and the Croats unleashed a program of ethnic cleansing. There were widespread massacres, and concentration camps were turned into killing centers. By 1943, it is estimated that at least 400,000 people had been murdered.

Kasche was in constant conflict with Edmund Glaise-Horstenau, the Wehrmacht Plenipotentiary-General in Croatia who protested the atrocities. After the unsuccessful Lorković–Vokić plot in 1944, an attempt to align Croatia with the Allies, Kasche denigrated Horstenau and forced his recall from Croatia, as he was involved in the plot. Kasche reported to Berlin on 18 April 1944 that "Croatia is one of the countries in which the Jewish problem has been solved".

== Post-war trial and execution ==
After the war in Europe ended, Kasche was returned to the Socialist Federal Republic of Yugoslavia by the Allies. He was tried by the Supreme Court of the People's Republic of Croatia in May 1947, convicted of war crimes and executed by hanging on 7 June 1947. His family refused to accept the verdict and throughout the 1950s-1960s bombarded the Auswärtiges Amt (Foreign Office) with letters demanding that the Federal Republic force Yugoslavia to admit that they executed an innocent man. In one letter, one of Kasche's brothers insisted that Siegfried Kasche had only been executed "because of the well known Serbian desire for revenge". There was a financial reason for these requests because as Siegfried Kasche had been executed as a war criminal, his family was not eligible for collecting a widow's or children's pensions. In 1968, when the West German Foreign Minister Willy Brandt was going to visit Belgrade to meet Marshal Josip Broz Tito, he received a letter from one of the Kasche brothers demanding "moral justice" and threatening to sue Yugoslavia in The Hague for the alleged injustice of executing Kasche. In what appeared to an attempt at blackmail, the letter to Brant noted that the Chancellor, Kurt Georg Kiesinger, had served in the Auswärtiges Amt during the Second World War and that Kiesinger "should therefore know my brother well".

== Sources ==
- Brissaud, André; Mabire, Jean; Odić, Slavko F.; Komarica, Slavko (1977). Noć i magla: Gestapo u Jugoslaviji (in Croatian). Centar za informacije i publicitet.
- Dizdar, Zdravko; Grčić, Marko; Ravlić, Slaven; Stuparić, Darko (1997). Tko je tko u NDH (in Croatian). Minerva. ISBN 9536377039.
- Evans, Richard J. (2005). The Third Reich in Power. New York: Penguin Press. ISBN 978-0-143-03790-3.
- Newspaper clippings about Siegfried Kasche in the 20th Century Press Archives of the ZBW
- Information about Siegfried Kasche in the Reichstag database
- Jacobsen, Hans Adolf (1961). Ausgewählte Dokumente zur Geschichte des Nationalsozialismus, 1933-1945 (in German). Verlag Neue Gesellschaft.
- Kay, Alex J. (2006). Exploitation, Resettlement, Mass Murder: Political and Economic Planning for German Occupation Policy in the Soviet Union, 1940-1941. Berghahn Books. ISBN 978-0-857-45165-1.
- Klee, Ernst (2007). Das Personenlexikon zum Dritten Reich. Wer war was vor und nach 1945. Frankfurt am Main: Fischer-Taschenbuch-Verlag. p. 299. ISBN 978-3-596-16048-8.
- Mazower, Mark (2008). Hitler's Empire: How the Nazis Ruled Europe. New York: The Penguin Press. ISBN 978-1-594-20188-2.
- McNab, Chris (2015). Germany's Secret Masterplan in World War II: What Would Have Happened If the Nazis Had Won the War. New York: Metro Books. ISBN 978-1-435-15902-0.
- Miller, Michael D.; Schulz, Andreas (2015). Leaders of the Storm Troops. Vol. 1. Solihull, England: Helion & Company. ISBN 978-1-909-98287-1.
- Siemens, Daniel (2017). Stormtroopers: A New History of Hitler's Brownshirts. New Haven: Yale University Press. ISBN 978-0-300-19681-8.
