= Hellmuth Becker =

Hellmuth Becker may refer to:

- Hellmuth Becker (SS officer)
- Hellmuth Becker (politician)
