= Karl Gutenberger =

German Nazi politician and SS general (1905–1961)

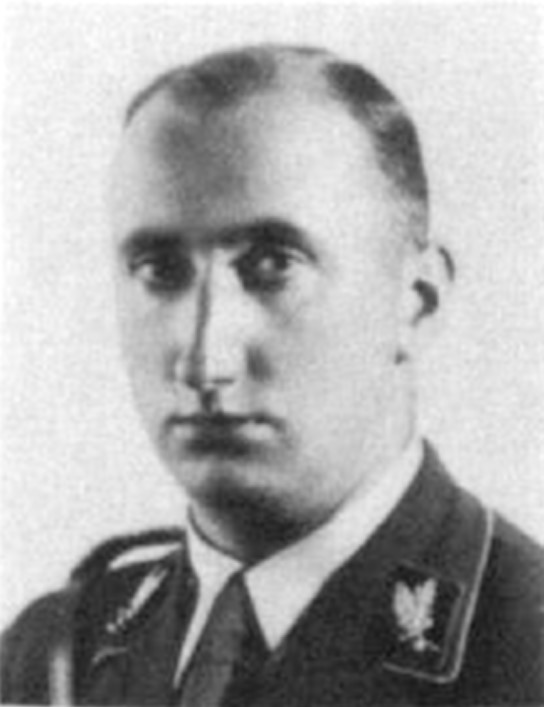
- Gutenberger, c. 1938
- Born: 18 April 1905; Essen, Kingdom of Prussia, German Empire
- Died: 8 July 1961 (age 56); Essen, West Germany
- Military career
- Allegiance: Nazi Germany
- Branch: Schutzstaffel; Waffen-SS
- Service years: 1940–1945
- Rank: SS-Obergruppenführer und General der Waffen-SS und Polizei
- Commands: Higher SS and Police Leader, "West"
- Conflicts: World War II
- Awards: Iron Cross, 2nd class War Merit Cross with Swords, 1st and 2nd class

Karl Gutenberger (18 April 1905 – 8 July 1961) was a Nazi Party politician, SS-Obergruppenführer and General of the Waffen-SS and the Police. He was Police President in Duisburg and Essen and was the Higher SS and Police Leader "West." He also served as a Reichstag deputy for the duration of Nazi Germany. After the end of the Second World War, he was sentenced to prison for murder and war crimes.

== Early life ==
Karl Gutenberger was the son of a manager of the Krupp factory in Essen. After Volksschule, he attended the Oberrealschule and the Realgymnasium in Altenessen. From 1921 and 1923, he completed a bank apprenticeship and then became a bank clerk.He also worked in business, including at Rheinstahl AG, a steel manufacturer in Essen, where he worked as a finance clerk from 1928 to 1929. He was also employed briefly for a newspaper, the National-Zeitung, from 1930 to 1931.

Gutenberger was active in the Nazi Party very early on, joining it in 1923 and again in mid-December 1925 (membership number 25,249) after the ban imposed on the Party in the wake of the Beer Hall Putsch was lifted. As an early Party member, he later was awarded the Golden Party Badge. He became the Ortsgruppenleiter (Local Group Leader) for the district of Siegeroth in Essen and also worked as a Gau-level Party speaker in Gau Essen. On 31 July 1932, he was elected to the Reichstag from electoral constituency 23 (Düsseldorf West), until it was dissolved that November. He was then elected to the Prussian Landtag in November 1932, serving until that body was abolished in October 1933, nine months after the Nazi seizure of power. He then returned to his seat as a Reichstag deputy from November 1933 until the end of the Nazi regime in May 1945.

== SA and SS career ==
A member of the Sturmabteilung (SA) since 1925, Gutenberger became a full-time SA officer in January 1932. He was promoted to SA-Standartenführer on 1 July 1932 and led SA Standarten (regiments) 159 and 60 in Essen and 138 in Wesel between January 1932 and August 1933. He was promoted to SA-Oberführer on 9 November 1933 and to SA-Brigadeführer on 20 April 1936. He successively commanded SA brigades 74 and 173 in Duisburg, 73 in Essen and 74 in Wesel between August 1933 and 12 December 1939 when he was assigned to SA-Gruppe Niederrhein. From 1 May 1937, he also served as Police President (chief of police) of the city of Duisburg. On 14 November 1939, he left Duisburg to become Police President of Essen, holding this office until 1 May 1941. On 9 April 1940, he left the SA and, on 1 June, he joined the SS (SS number 372,303) with the rank of SS-Brigadeführer. He was attached to the staff of SS-Oberabschnittt (Main District) "West" in Düsseldorf. On 29 June 1941, he succeeded Friedrich Jeckeln as both Leader of SS-Oberabschnittt "West" and as Higher SS and Police Leader "West". His jurisdiction comprised most of the northern Rhineland and Westphalia. He would retain both posts until the end of the Second World War.

Gutenberger was promoted to SS-Gruppenführer and Generalleutnant of Police on 9 November 1942. This was followed on 1 August 1944 by advancement to SS-Obergruppenführer and General of Police. On 16 November, he was given the designation of General of the Waffen-SS with an effective date of 1 July. Also in November 1944, he was appointed Inspector of Passive Resistance and Special Defense "West", heading the clandestine volunteer Werwolf forces in his jurisdiction. Toward the end of the war he was responsible for numerous extrajudicial murders, including on the instructions of Reichsführer-SS Heinrich Himmler, having the Allied-appointed Oberbürgermeister (Lord Mayor) of Aachen, Franz Oppenhoff, murdered on 25 March 1945. During the course of the war, Gutenberger was awarded the Iron Cross, 2nd class, and the War Merit Cross with Swords, 1st and 2nd class.

== SA, SS and police ranks ==
SA, SS and police ranks
Date	Rank
1 July 1932	SA-Standartenführer
9 November 1933	SA-Oberführer
20 April 1936	SA-Brigadeführer
1 June 1940	SS-Brigadeführer
1 March 1942	SS-Brigadeführer and Generalmajor of Police
9 November 1942	SS-Gruppenführer and Generalleutnant of Police
1 August 1944	SS-Obergruppenführer and General of Police
16 November 1944 (effective date:1 July)	SS-Obergruppenführer and General of the Waffen-SS

== Post-war prosecution ==
After the end of the war, Gutenberger was captured by American forces 10 May 1945 at Schloss Lopshorn in Lippe and handed over to British authorities. Placed in internment, on 20 October 1948 a British military court in Hamburg sentenced him to twelve years in prison for the murder of foreign workers. Further trials before German civil courts followed. On 22 October 1949, he received a four-year sentence from an Aachen court for his role in the Oppenhoff murder. A conviction on 16 March 1950 to a five-year prison sentence for crimes against humanity for his part in the murder of Allied airmen who had been shot down was later overturned on appeal in 1952. Due to an amnesty, Gutenberger was released from Werl Prison on 9 May 1953. After his release, he worked in a wholesale business and died in 1961.

== Sources ==
- Klee, Ernst (2007). Das Personenlexikon zum Dritten Reich. Wer war was vor und nach 1945. Frankfurt-am-Main: Fischer-Taschenbuch-Verlag. ISBN 978-3-596-16048-8.
- Miller, Michael D. (2006). Leaders of the SS & German Police. Vol. 1 Reichsführer SS – Gruppenführer (Georg Ahrens to Karl Gutenberger). R. James Bender Publishing. ISBN 978-9-329-70037-2.
- Yerger, Mark C. (1997). Allgemeine-SS: The Commands, Units and Leaders of the General SS. Schiffer Publishing Ltd. ISBN 0-7643-0145-4.
- Williams, Max (2015). SS Elite: The Senior Leaders of Hitler's Praetorian Guard. Vol. 1. Fonthill Media LLC. ISBN 978-1-78155-433-3.
