= Heinrich Schoene =

German SA general and Nazi politician (1889–1945)

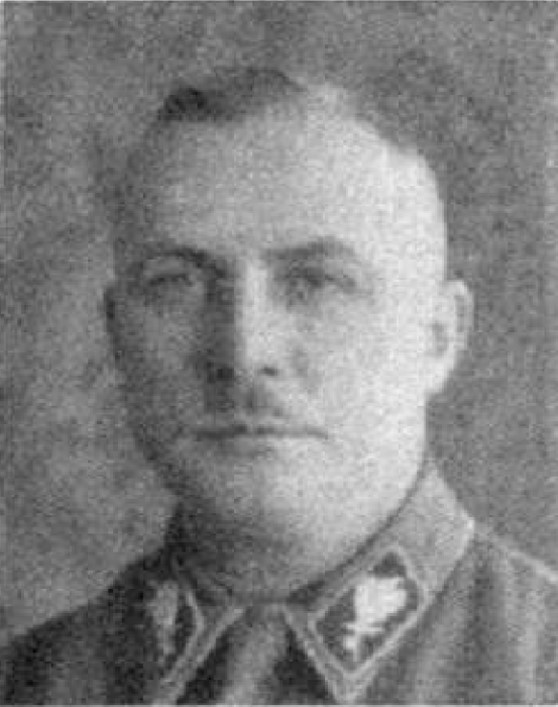
- Schoene, c. 1934

Generalkommissar, Generalbezirk Volhynia-Podolia
- In office 1 September 1941 – February 1944
- Preceded by: Office created
- Succeeded by: Office abolished

Führer, SA-Gruppe Ostland
- In office 1 February 1934 – 9 April 1945

Police President, Königsberg
- In office 1 February 1934 – 15 February 1942
- Preceded by: Adolf Kob
- Succeeded by: Eugen Dorsch

Führer, SA-Gruppe Nordmark
- In office May 1929 – 31 January 1934

Additional positions
- 1933–1945: Reichstag Deputy
- 1934–1942: Prussian Provincial Councilor
- 1932–1933: Landtag of Prussia Deputy

Personal details
- Born: 25 November 1889 Berlin, Kingdom of Prussia, German Empire
- Died: 9 April 1945 (aged 55) Königsberg, East Prussia, Nazi Germany
- Party: Nazi Party
- Other political affiliations: German National People's Party; Völkisch-Social Bloc; National Socialist Freedom Party
- Occupation: Estate administrator
- Civilian awards: Golden Party Badge; Nuremberg Party Day Badge

Military service
- Allegiance: German Empire
- Branch/service: Imperial German Army
- Years of service: 1914–1918
- Rank: Feldwebel
- Battles/wars: World War I
- Military awards: Iron Cross, 2nd class Wound Badge

Heinrich Schoene (25 November 1889 – 9 April 1945) was a Nazi Party official, politician and member of the Reichstag. He was also a member of the Nazi paramilitary Sturmabteilung (SA) who rose to the rank of SA-Obergruppenführer. During the Second World War, he was the Generalkommissar of Volhynia-Podolia in the Reichskommissariat Ukraine when Holocaust-related massacres took place. He was killed near the war's end at the Battle of Königsberg.

== Early life ==
Schoene was born in Berlin the son of a bricklayer and carpenter. He attended a Gymnasium before transferring to an agricultural school and receiving an Obersekundareife certificate. He worked as an agricultural laborer and estate administrator. He participated in the First World War as an infantryman with the Imperial German Army. He attained the rank of Feldwebel and was awarded the Iron Cross, 2nd class and the Wound Badge for being twice wounded. After being discharged from the military, he settled at the military training area in Lockstedt where he ran a small construction business. Becoming politically active, he was a member of the conservative German National People's Party from 1919 to 1920 and joined the more right-wing Völkisch-Social Bloc and the National Socialist Freedom Party between 1924 and 1925, at a time when the Nazi Party was banned in the wake of the failed Beer Hall Putsch. He served as the local party secretary in both organizations.

== Career in the Nazi Party and the SA ==
On 20 April 1925, Schoene joined the Nazi paramilitary organization, the Sturmabteilung (SA), and he joined the Nazi Party on 14 August. As an early member, he later would be awarded the Golden Party Badge. From 1926, he was the local leader of both the SA and the Hitler Youth in Lockstedt. He became a Parteiredner (party speaker) and the Ortsgruppenleiter (local group leader), advancing to Kreisleiter (district leader) in the Steinburg district in 1927. In May 1928, he was charged with establishing the SA in Gau Schleswig-Holstein and was promoted in May 1929 to SA-Oberführer as head of SA-Gruppe Nordmark with headquarters in Kiel. He attended the Nuremberg rally of August 1929 and was awarded the Nuremberg Party Day Badge. Schoene was promoted to SA-Gruppenführer in July 1932 and continued to lead SA-Gruppe Nordmark until 31 January 1934. A strong propagandist, he helped to establish the Nazis as the leading party in this predominantly rural area, eclipsing the previously strong Rural People's Movement. Schoene was an advocate for a perceived extra-legal authority of the SA and, even after the Nazi seizure of power in 1933, he opposed the civil and legal authorities by disputing their jurisdiction in prosecuting his SA troops for breach of the peace, assault or unlawful detention of political opponents.

From April 1932 to its dissolution in October 1933, Schoene was a member of the Landtag of Prussia and, on 12 November 1933, he was elected as a member of the Reichstag from electoral constituency 13 (Schleswig-Holstein). He was reelected in 1936 and 1938, representing constituency 1 (East Prussia) and retained that seat until his death. On 1 February 1934, he was appointed Führer of SA-Gruppe Ostland, with headquarters in Königsberg (today, Kaliningrad), leading the SA in Gau East Prussia and Danzig. He was promoted to SA-Obergruppenführer on 24 April 1934. From 1 February 1934 to 15 February 1942, he was police president of Königsberg and, from 1 February 1934 to 31 March 1939, he also held the office of Landesgruppenführer (state group leader) of the Reichsluftschutzbund in East Prussia. From 1934 to 1942 he was a provincial councilor of the Province of East Prussia. In 1943, he was appointed an inspector of the Marine SA.

== Ukraine, Holocaust involvement and death ==
From 1 September 1941 to February 1944, Schoene served in the Reichskommissariat Ukraine as Generalkommissar for the Generalbezirk (general district) Volhynia-Podolia, headquartered in Lutz (today, Lutsk). He was one of a number of SA officials selected for assignments in the occupied territories because of his administrative competence and because he was a committed Nazi whose ideological credentials were beyond question.

During Schoene's tenure, the estimated 400,000 Jews of the district were gathered together in about 130 ghettos. At a meeting in Lutz in August 1942, a complete liquidation of the ghettos was discussed on the orders of Reichskommissar Erich Koch. A stay of execution for two months was permitted only for small groups of vital workers, not to exceed 500 men. In Schoene's capital, the Lutsk Ghetto was established in December 1941, where the residents suffered from overcrowding, cold and hunger. Daily food rations were 5.3 ounces of bread for workers, 2.6 ounces for non-workers and one ounce for children. Starvation was widespread and an outbreak of typhus claimed many lives. The ghetto was liquidated on August 19–23 1942 by the German civilian authorities and police, assisted by Ukrainian policemen. Over 17,000 residents were marched to a hill on the outskirts of the city where they were lined up before trenches and shot. The remaining 500 Jews who were employed as artisans in a labor camp were massacred on 12 December.

After the Red Army drove the Nazis out of Lutsk in February 1944, Schoene returned to East Prussia. On 9 April 1945, he was killed on the last day of the Battle of Königsberg, fighting against the Russians.

== Sources ==
- Campbell, Bruce (1998). The SA Generals and the Rise of Nazism. Lexington: University Press of Kentucky. ISBN 978-0-813-12047-8.
- Information about Heinrich Schoene in the Reichstag database
- Siemens, Daniel (2017). Stormtroopers: A New History of Hitler's Brownshirts. New Haven: Yale University Press. ISBN 978-0-300-19681-8.
- Stockhorst, Erich (1985). 5000 Köpfe: Wer War Was im 3. Reich. Arndt. ISBN 978-3-887-41116-9.
