= Wilhelm Schroeder =

German Nazi politician and SS officer (1898–1943)

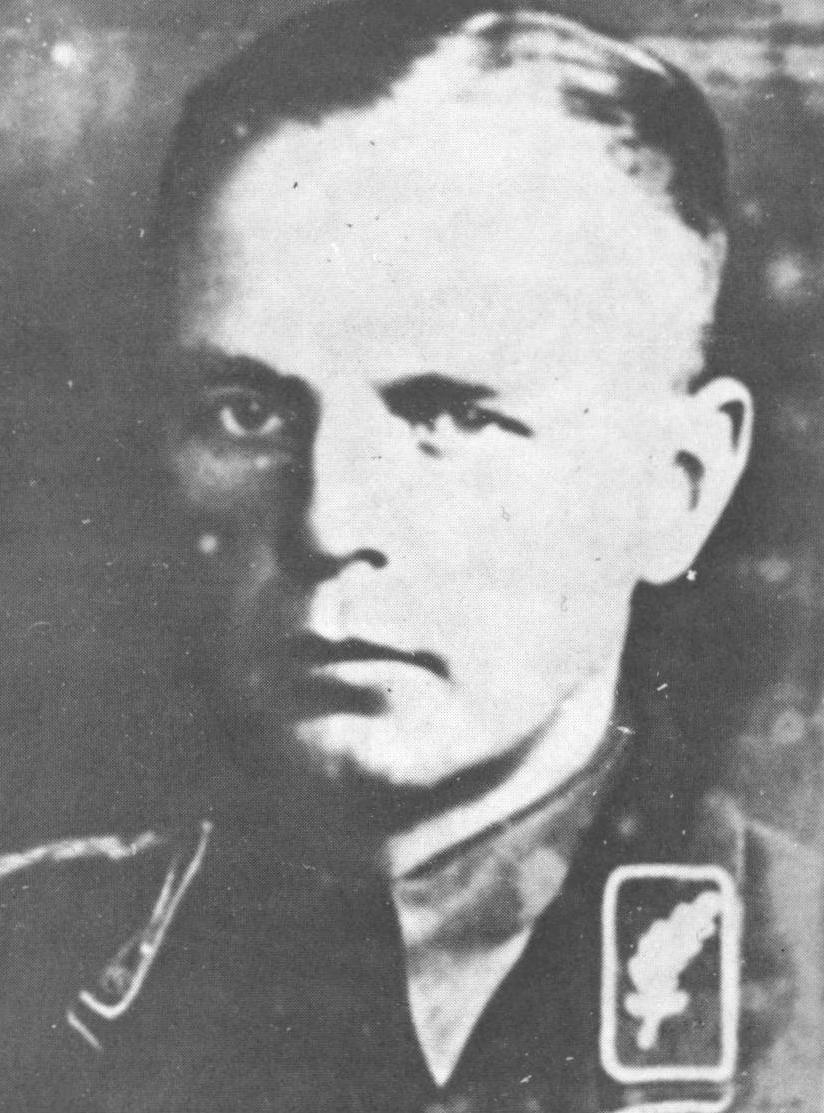

Reichstag deputy
- In office 31 July 1932 – 14 October 1933

Reichstag deputy
- In office 12 November 1933 – 8 July 1943

Personal details
- Born: April 23, 1898 Leipzig, Kingdom of Saxony, German Empire
- Died: July 8, 1943 (aged 45) Location undetermined: either in Carinthia or in the Soviet Union
- Cause of death: Killed in action
- Education: Ludwig-Maximilians-Universität München
- Occupation: Agricultural estate manager
- Civilian awards: Golden Party Badge

Military service
- Allegiance: German Empire; Nazi Germany
- Branch/service: Imperial German Army; Luftstreitkräfte; German Army; Waffen-SS
- Years of service: 1914–1918; 1939–1943
- Rank: Leutnant; Oberleutnant; SS-Obersturmführer
- Battles/wars: World War I World War II
- Military awards: Iron Cross, 1st and 2nd class

Wilhelm Schroeder (23 April 1898 – 8 July 1943) was a German agricultural estate manager, a Nazi Party politician and an SS-Oberführer. He served as a deputy in the Reichstag from 1933 until his death. As an officer in the Waffen-SS, he was killed in action in the Second World War.

== Early life ==
Schroeder was born in Leipzig and attended the local Volksschule. From October 1914, he took part in the First World War, first with the 19th (2nd Royal Saxon) Hussars and, from October 1917, as a pilot with Aviation Detachment A 256. From 1916, he held the rank of Leutnant of reserves. During the war, he was awarded the Iron Cross 1st and 2nd class. After returning to civilian life, he attended a Gymnasium in Dresden from 1919 to 1920, where he obtained his Abitur. He completed an agricultural apprenticeship from 1920 to 1921 and then spent a year studying agriculture, economics, history and art at the Ludwig-Maximilians-Universität München. From 1923 to 1932, Schroeder earned his living as an estate manager, and he married in 1927.

== Career in the Nazi Party ==
In January 1923, Schroeder joined the Nazi Party (membership number 63,277), after having been associated with it since 1922. As an early Party member, he later would be awarded the Golden Party Badge. He also became a member of the Sturmabteilung (SA), the Party's paramilitary organization. After the Party was temporarily banned from November 1923 to January 1925, he rejoined it in 1926. In the following years, he held various party posts, from 1930 as a party speaker, an Ortsgruppenleiter (local group leader) and a Kreis (district) expert agricultural advisor. In 1932, he also assumed the leadership of SA-Standarte 139 with the rank of SA-Sturmbannführer.

In the parliamentary election of July 1932, Schroeder was elected to the Reichstag for electoral constituency 29 (Leipzig). Among the parliamentary votes in which Schroeder participated was the passage of the Enabling Act in March 1933. He would retain his seat in the national parliament until his death, switching to constituency 22 (Düsseldorf East) in the election of March 1936, and to constituency 34 (Hamburg) in April 1938.

After the Nazi seizure of power at the end of January 1933, Schroeder was promoted to SA-Standartenführer. In 1934, he became a member of the State Farmers' Council of Saxony. On February 12, 1935, he joined the Allgemeine-SS (membership number 261,293) as an SS-Standartenführer. From May 6, 1935, to January 15, 1937, he led the 20th SS-Standarte in Düsseldorf. From January 1, 1937, to May 20, 1939, Schroeder was the leader of SS-Abschnitt (district) XV, headquartered in Altona. On November 9, 1937, he was promoted to SS-Oberführer. On June 1, 1939, he was appointed the first chief of staff of SS-Oberabschnitt (main district) "Alpenland" in Salzburg, a post he would retain until his death.

== Wartime service and death ==
After the outbreak of the Second World War in 1939, Schroeder returned to military service as a Leutnant of reserves with the German Army and was promoted to Oberleutnant the next year. In 1943, he transferred to the Waffen-SS with the rank of SS-Obersturmführer of reserves.

Schroeder was killed in action on July 8, 1943. However, there is a discrepancy as to the circumstances of his death. Two sources indicate that Schroeder died in July 1943 during an anti-partisan operation in Carinthia. Another document (letter of condolence from his commander F. Bochmann, dated July 15, 1943) states that on July 8, 1943, Schroeder "remained in front of the enemy west of the village of Gouki as the head of the heavy tank company of our regiment." A newspaper clipping also refers to the fact that Schroeder "fell as an SS-Obersturmführer and company commander in the SS Panzer Grenadier Division Totenkopf during the current heavy fighting in the East".

Schroeder was a holder of the Reich Sports Badge in gold, the SS Honor Sword and the SS Honor Ring.

== Sources ==
- Information about Wilhelm Schroeder in the Reichstag database
- Literature by and about Wilhelm Schroeder in the German National Library catalogue
- Schiffer Publishing Ltd., ed. (2000). SS Officers List: SS-Standartenführer to SS-Oberstgruppenführer (As of 30 January 1942). Schiffer Military History Publishing. ISBN 0-7643-1061-5.
- Stockhorst, Erich (1985). 5000 Köpfe: Wer War Was im 3. Reich. Arndt. ISBN 978-3-887-41116-9.
- Yerger, Mark C. (1997). The Allgemeine-SS: The Commands, Units and Leaders of the General SS. Schiffer Publishing Ltd. ISBN 0-7643-0145-4.
