= Hellmuth Becker (politician) =

German Nazi politician (1902–1962)

Reichstag Deputy
- In office 12 November 1933 – 8 May 1945
- Succeeded by: Carl August Schröder

Personal details
- Born: 9 February 1902 Kleve, Kingdom of Prussia, German Empire
- Died: 12 June 1962 (aged 60) Hamburg, West Germany
- Party: Nazi Party
- Education: Ph.D.
- Alma mater: University of Hamburg

Hellmuth Becker (also Hellmut or Helmut; 9 February 1902 – 12 June 1962) was a German Nazi politician. He was a member of the Hamburg Parliament from 1932 to 1933 and from 1933 to 1945 he was active in the National Socialist Reichstag and in Hamburg's Nazi cultural policy.

Becker was born in Kleve and graduated from high school in Eppendorf near Hamburg. He then served in the Reichswehr for a year and then worked as a commercial clerk for three years. He studied political science at the University of Hamburg and received his doctorate in 1929. He then headed a department of a Hamburg building society until 1932 and joined the Nazi Party (NSDAP) on 1 January 1931 (membership number 456,105).

Becker was a member of the Hamburg Parliament from 1932 to 25 March 1933 and was the chairman of the local NSDAP faction in March 1933. At the November 1933 parliamentary election, he was elected as a deputy to the Reichstag from electoral constituency 34, Hamburg. He retained that seat until the fall of the Nazi regime in May 1945. During the Nazi era, he was the Gauamtsleiter of the Gau Hamburg. In August 1933, Becker became a member of the Hamburg State Council, a newly created body that was renamed the Council of Aldermen on 1 April 1938. From 1940 to May 1945, he was head of the administration for art and cultural affairs in the Hamburg municipal administration. He was allowed to use the title of Senator, even though there was no Senate at the time. After the war, he stayed in Hamburg and died there in 1962.

== Sources ==
- Information about Hellmuth Becker (politician) in the Reichstag database
- Joachim Lilla, Martin Döring, Andreas Schulz: Statisten in Uniform. Die Mitglieder des Reichstags 1933–1945. Ein biographisches Handbuch. Unter Einbeziehung der völkischen und nationalsozialistischen Reichstagsabgeordneten ab Mai 1924. Droste, Düsseldorf 2004, ISBN 3-7700-5254-4
- Stockhorst, Erich (1985). 5000 Köpfe: Wer War Was im 3. Reich. Arndt. ISBN 978-3-887-41116-9.
- Maike Bruhns: Kunst in der Krise. Bd. 1: Hamburger Kunst im „Dritten Reich“. Dölling und Galitz, Hamburg 2001.
