= Peter Bell (German politician) =

German Nazi politician (1889–1939)

Reichstag Deputy
- In office 12 November 1933 – 22 September 1939

Bürgermeister, Viechtach
- In office 1933–1936

Personal details
- Born: 15 July 1889 Metz, Alsace-Lorraine, German Empire
- Died: 22 September 1939 (aged 50) Neuburg an der Donau, Bavaria, Nazi Germany
- Party: Nazi Party
- Education: LMU Munich; Technical University of Munich
- Profession: Teacher

Military service
- Allegiance: German Empire
- Branch/service: Royal Bavarian Army
- Years of service: 1914–1918
- Unit: 1st Royal Bavarian Infantry Regiment
- Battles/wars: World War I

Peter Bell (15 July 1889 – 22 September 1939) was a German teacher who became a Nazi Party politician and functionary. He served as the Bürgermeister of Viechtach, and sat as a deputy in the Reichstag from 1933 until his death.

== Early life ==
Bell was born at Metz in Alsace-Lorraine and attended the Volksschule in Cologne, followed by the Realprogymnasium in Cologne-Nippes and the Realgymnasium in Düsseldorf and in Munich. From 1911 to 1914, he studied German, history and French at LMU Munich. In 1914, he volunteered for military service with the 1st Royal Bavarian Infantry Regiment and fought in the First World War until 1918. In 1920, Bell received his doctorate at the Technical University of Munich. He became a senior teacher in Zweibrücken in 1922, but was expelled from the Palatinate in February 1923 by the French occupation authorities. He became a senior teacher at the Realschule in Cham, in the Upper Palatinate from April 1923.

== Nazi Party career ==
On 1 March 1931, Bell joined the Nazi Party (membership number 519,175). He was elected as a deputy to the Reichstag from electoral constituency 25, Lower Bavaria–Upper Palatinate in November 1933 and held this seat until his death. He also became a member of the Cham city council. From 1933 to 1936, Bell was the Party Kreisleiter (county leader) and Bürgermeister (mayor) of Viechtach, where he also served as chairman of the Regentalbahn AG supervisory board. From 1933, he was a member of the Kreistag (district council) of Lower Bavaria–Upper Palatinate. In addition, he later became head of the Gau Border Office of the Gau Bavarian Ostmark. From April 1937, he was the head of the Realschule at Neuburg an der Donau. Concurrently, he was the Bavarian regional leader of the Bund Deutscher Osten, an anti-Polish irredentist society. Bell died in September 1939 at Neuburg an der Donau.

== Sources ==
- Joachim Lilla; Martin Doring; Andreas Schulz (Editors): Statisten in Uniform: Die Mitglieder des Reichstags 1933–1945. Ein biographisches Handbuch. Unter Einbeziehung der völkischen und nationalsozialistischen Reichstagsabgeordneten ab Mai 1924. Droste Verlag, Dusseldorf 2004, ISBN 3-7700-5254-4.
- Peter Bell biography in the Reichstag Members Database.
- Stockhorst, Erich (1985). 5000 Köpfe: Wer War Was im 3. Reich. Arndt. ISBN 978-3-887-41116-9.
