= Schleswig-Holstein (electoral district) =

Former constituency of the Reichstag (Weimar Republic)

13 Schleswig-Holstein
- Former electoral constituency for the Reichstag
- Location within the Weimar Republic
- State: Prussia & Oldenburg
- Province: Schleswig-Holstein
- Electorate: 931,787 (1920); 1,133,150 (1933)
- Major settlements: Kiel, Altona, Flensburg, Neumünster, Wandsbek

Former constituency
- Created: 1919
- Abolished: 1938

Schleswig-Holstein was one of the 35 electoral districts (German: Wahlkreise) used to elect members to the Reichstag during the Weimar Republic. It sent members to the Reichstag in nine democratic elections between 1919 and 1933. It existed nominally in the show elections to the Nazi Reichstag until 1938.

It comprised the province of Schleswig-Holstein within the Free State of Prussia and the Landesteil Lübeck from the Free State of Oldenburg. It was constituency 13 in the numbering scheme.

== Electoral system ==
The constituency was created for the January 1919 election. Under the proportional representation electoral system of the Weimar Republic, voters cast a vote for party lists. Parties were awarded a seat for every 60,000 votes in a constituency. Excess votes were aggregated at two higher levels of seat distribution: an intermediate level combining multiple constituencies, where extra seats were awarded to parties' constituency lists, and a national level where seats were awarded to national lists of each party or alliance.

== Results (1919–1933) ==
=== Vote share ===
Party	1919	1920 (Note: Elections in Schleswig-Holstein were delayed until February 1921 due to territorial plebiscites.)	1924 I	1924 II	1928	1930	1932 I	1932 II	1933
KPD		6.1	10.3	6.7	7.9	10.6	10.7	13.3	10.7
USPD	3.4	3.0	1.1	0.5		0.1			
SPD	45.8	37.3	24.9	30.3	35.3	29.8	26.2	24.7	22.1
DDP	27.2	9.4	8.1	8.7	5.7	4.7	1.4	1.2	0.8
Centre	1.0	0.8	1.0	1.1	1.1	1.0	1.2	1.0	1.0
DVP	7.8	18.4	12.1	14.6	13.7	7.2	1.4	2.1	1.3
SHBLD	7.2								
DNVP	7.7	20.5	31.0	33.0	23.0	6.1	6.5	10.3	10.1
Nazi			7.4	2.7	4.0	27.0	51.0	45.7	53.1
Other		4.5	4.2	2.4	9.4	13.4	1.6	1.7	0.6
Turnout		78.3	77.2	77.3	76.9	82.6	87.7	84.9	89.5
Source: Wahlen in Deutschland

=== Deputies ===
Election	Distribution	Seats
1919		11
1920 (Note: Elections in Schleswig-Holstein were delayed until February 1921 due to territorial plebiscites.)		9
May 1924		10
Dec 1924		12
1928		11
1930		11
Jul 1932		14
Nov 1932		14
1933		15
Source: Wahlen in Deutschland
