= Palatinate (electoral district) =

Former constituency of the Reichstag (Weimar Republic)

27 Palatinate Pfalz
- Former electoral constituency for the Reichstag
- Location within the Weimar Republic
- State: Bavaria
- Electorate: 520,430 (1919); 647,678 (1933)
- Major settlements: Ludwigshafen, Kaiserslautern, Pirmasens, Zweibrücken, Landau, Neustadt an der Weinstraße, Speyer

Former constituency
- Created: 1919
- Abolished: 1938

Palatinate was one of the 35 electoral districts (German: Wahlkreise) used to elect members to the Reichstag during the Weimar Republic. It sent members to the Reichstag in nine democratic elections between 1919 and 1933. It existed nominally in the show elections to the Nazi Reichstag until 1938.

Its boundaries corresponded to the contemporary Regierungsbezirke of Palatinate within the Free State of Bavaria. It was constituency 27 in the numbering scheme. Following the Saar plebiscite of 13 January 1935, the Saar was incorporated into Nazi Germany on 1 March 1935. The new territory was merged with the Palatinate, and the electoral district was renamed Palatinate–Saar.

== Electoral system ==
The constituency was created for the 1919 election. Under the proportional representation electoral system of the Weimar Republic, voters cast a vote for party lists. Parties were awarded a seat for every 60,000 votes in a constituency. Excess votes were aggregated at two higher levels of seat distribution: an intermediate level combining multiple constituencies, where extra seats were awarded to parties' constituency lists, and a national level where seats were awarded to national lists of each party or alliance.

== Results (1919–1933) ==
=== Vote share ===
| Party | 1919 | 1920 | 1924 I | 1924 II | 1928 | 1930 | 1932 I | 1932 II | 1933 |
|---|---|---|---|---|---|---|---|---|---|
| KPD | | 0.8 | 13.5 | 8.1 | 7.1 | 10.5 | 10.7 | 12.9 | 9.0 |
| USPD | 1.6 | 10.8 | 0.3 | 0.7 | 0.1 | | | | |
| SPD | 37.9 | 24.4 | 23.3 | 26.8 | 29.0 | 22.4 | 17.6 | 16.1 | 16.8 |
| DDP | 13.2 | 8.9 | 5.5 | 6.7 | 3.9 | 2.3 | 0.4 | 0.6 | 0.5 |
| Centre | | | 10.6 | 11.6 | 26.4 | 25.6 | 23.8 | 22.5 | 22.7 |
| BVP | 27.6 | 26.1 | 17.6 | 15.6 | (Note: Joint list with Centre.) | | | | |
| DVP | 19.7 | 29.1 | 16.3 | 23.5 | 14.7 | 6.6 | 1.4 | 2.1 | 1.2 |
| DNVP | | | 6.4 | 4.4 | 2.8 | 0.8 | 1.1 | 1.8 | 2.5 |
| Nazi | | | 5.7 | 1.9 | 5.7 | 22.8 | 43.7 | 42.5 | 46.5 |
| Other | | | 0.6 | 0.5 | 10.4 | 7.4 | 1.3 | 1.4 | 0.7 |
| Turnout | 86.5 | 73.7 | 71.9 | 80.2 | 71.0 | 76.8 | 87.2 | 84.1 | 91.3 |
Source: Wahlen in Deutschland

=== Deputies ===
| Election | Distribution | Seats |
|---|---|---|
| 1919 | | 6 |
| 1920 | | 4 |
| May 1924 | | 3 |
| Dec 1924 | | 4 |
| 1928 | | 4 |
| 1930 | | 4 |
| Jul 1932 | | 8 |
| Nov 1932 | | 7 |
| 1933 | | 8 |
Source: Wahlen in Deutschland
