= Düsseldorf West (electoral district) =

Former constituency of the Reichstag (Weimar Republic)

23 Düsseldorf West Düsseldorf-West
- Former electoral constituency for the Reichstag
- Location within the Weimar Republic
- State: Prussia
- Province: Rhine Province
- Electorate: 830,499 (1919); 1,275,232 (1933)
- Major settlements: Duisburg, Mönchengladbach, Oberhausen, Krefeld, Mülheim, Neuss

Former constituency
- Created: 1919
- Abolished: 1938

Düsseldorf West was one of the 35 electoral districts (German: Wahlkreise) used to elect members to the Reichstag during the Weimar Republic. It sent members to the Reichstag in nine democratic elections held between 1919 and 1933. It existed nominally during the show elections to the Nazi Reichstag until 1938.

It comprised the western part of the Regierungsbezirk Düsseldorf in the Prussian Rhine Province, including the cities of Duisburg, Mönchengladbach, Oberhausen, and Mülheim. It was constituency 23 in the numbering scheme.

== Electoral system ==
The constituency was created for the 1919 election. Under the proportional representation electoral system of the Weimar Republic, voters cast a vote for party lists. Parties were awarded a seat for every 60,000 votes in a constituency. Excess votes were aggregated at two higher levels of seat distribution: an intermediate level combining multiple constituencies (awarding extra seats to parties' constituency lists) and a national level (awarding seats to national lists of each party or alliance).

== Results (1919–1933) ==
=== Vote share ===
Party	1919	1920	1924 I	1924 II	1928	1930	1932 I	1932 II	1933
KPD		5.1	18.9	12.4	14.7	17.5	19.8	22.6	15.5
USPD	0.8	13.8	0.8	0.4					
SPD	26.9	13.5	9.7	13.9	17.2	11.8	10.2	9.6	9.0
DDP	7.1	4.7	2.9	3.5	2.5	1.6	0.2	0.2	0.2
Centre	49.8	42.0	40.7	43.1	35.6	30.7	34.1	32.9	30.4
DVP	9.5	12.1	9.1	9.6	8.4	4.4	1.0	1.5	0.9
DNVP	5.9	6.1	10.8	11.3	10.7	5.9	5.9	7.0	8.0
Nazi			2.6	0.9	1.2	16.8	27.0	24.2	35.2
Other	0.0	2.7	4.4	4.9	9.6	11.4	1.9	2.1	0.8
Turnout	84.5	79.1	76.9	76.1	76.3	84.0	85.4	80.7	89.5
Source: Wahlen in Deutschland

=== Deputies ===
Election	Distribution	Seats
1919		11
1920		9
May 1924		10
Dec 1924		11
1928		11
1930		13
Jul 1932		16
Nov 1932		15
1933		17
Source: Wahlen in Deutschland
