= Hamburg (electoral district) =

Former constituency of the Reichstag (Weimar Republic)

34 Hamburg
- Former electoral constituency for the Reichstag
- Location within the Weimar Republic
- State: Hamburg
- Electorate: 658,401 (1919); 932,831 (1933)
- Major settlements: Hamburg, Cuxhaven

Former constituency
- Created: 1920
- Abolished: 1938

Hamburg was one of the 35 electoral districts (German: Wahlkreise) used to elect members to the Reichstag during the Weimar Republic. It sent members to the Reichstag in eight democratic elections between 1920 and 1933. It existed nominally in the show elections to the Nazi Reichstag until 1938.

Its boundaries corresponded to the contemporary Free and Hanseatic City of Hamburg. It was constituency 34 in the numbering scheme.

== Electoral system ==
The constituency was created for the 1920 election, following the redrawing of districts in the Hanover/Hamburg region. Under the proportional representation electoral system of the Weimar Republic, voters cast a vote for party lists. Parties were awarded a seat for every 60,000 votes in a constituency. Excess votes were aggregated at two higher levels of seat distribution: an intermediate level combining multiple constituencies, where extra seats were awarded to parties' constituency lists, and a national level where seats were awarded to national lists of each party or alliance.

== Results (1919–1933) ==
=== Vote share ===
Party	1919 (Note: Notional results on 1920 boundaries.)	1920	1924 I	1924 II	1928	1930	1932 I	1932 II	1933
KPD		0.5	18.3	14.3	16.8	18.0	17.7	21.9	17.6
USPD	6.7	15.1	0.5	0.2		0.1			
SPD	51.3	38.3	27.7	32.2	36.8	32.0	31.7	28.6	26.9
DDP	26.3	17.4	13.0	12.5	11.6	8.5	6.0	5.4	3.5
Centre	1.2	1.0	1.5	1.7	1.6	1.5	2.0	1.7	1.9
DVP	11.7	15.0	12.2	13.2	13.8	9.2	2.0	3.3	2.4
DNVP	2.7	12.4	19.5	21.6	12.8	4.2	5.2	9.3	8.0
Nazi			6.0	2.3	2.6	19.2	33.7	27.2	38.8
Other	0.0	0.1	1.2	2.0	4.0	7.3	1.7	2.5	0.9
Turnout	90.6	74.8	78.4	76.2	79.4	83.1	84.2	83.0	88.9
Source: Wahlen in Deutschland

=== Deputies ===
Election	Distribution	Seats
1920		7
May 1924		9
Dec 1924		8
1928		8
1930		10
Jul 1932		11
Nov 1932		9
1933		11
Source: Wahlen in Deutschland
