= List of constituencies and constituency associations of the Weimar Republic =

The list of constituencies and constituency associations of the Weimar Republic (German: Wahlkreise and Wahlkreisverbände) contains the constituencies and constituency associations for the election to the German National Assembly in 1919 and the Reichstag elections in the German Reich from 1920 to 1933. The list was an appendix to the Reich Electoral Law of April 1920.

== Electoral system ==
For elections to the Reichstag of the Weimar Republic, Germany was divided into 35 constituencies, which were further grouped into electoral district associations. The Weimar electoral system stipulated that a constituency list was initially allocated one seat in the Reichstag for every 60,000 votes it received in its constituency. In a second step, all remaining votes from the combined lists within the respective electoral district association were tallied. For every 60,000 of these remaining votes, the combined lists again received one seat, but only if at least one of the constituency lists had received at least 30,000 votes. In a third allocation step, the remaining votes from the electoral district associations were aggregated nationwide, and once again, one seat was allocated to the national party list for every 60,000 votes received. For any remaining votes exceeding 30,000, one seat was awarded. The number of seats allocated via the national party list was limited to the number of seats already allocated to constituency lists.

The division of constituencies and constituency associations remained almost unchanged from 1919 to 1933; the only exceptions were the loss of the territories after the Treaty of Versailles and the merging of the two Silesian constituency associations in 1924, which changed the numbering throughout the Reich.

== Constituencies in 1919 ==
This division was valid for the 1919 election to the German National Assembly. In Alsace–Lorraine, the election could not take place due to the French occupation, and in Posen it was boycotted by the Polish population.

List

No.	Name	Area
1	Ostpreußen	Province of Ostpreußen
2	Westpreußen	Province of Westpreußen
3	Berlin	Berlin within its 1919 borders
4	Potsdam I	Potsdam administrative district excluding the districts and cities belonging to electoral district 3
5	Potsdam II	From the Potsdam administrative district, the districts of Teltow and Beeskow-Storkow, as well as the cities of Charlottenburg, Berlin-Wilmersdorf, Berlin-Schöneberg and Neukölln
6	Frankfurt/Oder	Administrative district of Frankfurt, province of Grenzmark Posen-Westpreußen
7	Pommern	Province of Pommern
8	Posen	Province of Posen
9	Breslau	Regierungsbezirk Breslau
10	Oppeln	Province of Oberschlesien
11	Liegnitz	Liegnitz administrative district
12	Magdeburg	Magdeburg administrative district, Freistaat Anhalt
13	Merseburg	Merseburg administrative district
14	Schleswig-Holstein	Province of Schleswig-Holstein, the Principality of Lübeck in the Free State of Oldenburg
15	Aurich, Osnabrück, Oldenburg	Administrative districts of Aurich and Osnabrück, and the Oldenburg region of the Free State of Oldenburg
16	Hannover, Hildesheim, Lüneburg, Braunschweig	Administrative districts of Hanover, Hildesheim and Lüneburg in the Free State of Brunswick
17	Westfalen-Nord	Administrative districts of Münster and Minden, Freistaat Lippe, Freistaat Schaumburg-Lippe, the district of Grafschaft Schaumburg from the province of Hesse-Nassau, and the district of Pyrmont from the Free State of Waldeck
18	Westfalen-Süd	Arnsberg administrative district
19	Hessen-Nassau	The province of Hesse-Nassau excluding the districts of Schmalkalden and Grafschaft Schaumburg, the district of Wetzlar from the Rhine Province, and the Free State of Waldeck excluding the district of Pyrmont.
20	Köln-Aachen	Administrative districts Cologne and Aachen
21	Koblenz-Trier	Koblenz administrative district excluding the Wetzlar district, Trier administrative district, and the Birkenfeld region in the Free State of Oldenburg.
22	Düsseldorf-Ost	From the administrative district of Düsseldorf, the cities and districts of Düsseldorf, Essen, Barmen, Elberfeld, Solingen, Remscheid, Lennep, Mettmann.
23	Düsseldorf-West	From the administrative district of Düsseldorf, the cities and districts of Neuss, Krefeld, München-Gladbach, Rheydt, Oberhausen, Sterkrade, Duisburg, Hamborn, Mülheim an der Ruhr, Kempen, Grevenbroich, Geldern, Kleve, Rees, Dinslaken, Moers
24	Oberbayern-Schwaben	Administrative districts of Oberbayern and Schwaben
25	Niederbayern-Oberpfalz	Administrative districts of Niederbayern and Oberpfalz
26	Franken	Administrative districts of Mittelfranken, Oberfranken and Unterfranken
27	Pfalz	Palatinate administrative district
28	Dresden-Bautzen	District authorities of Dresden and Bautzen
29	Leipzig	Leipzig District Authority
30	Chemnitz-Zwickau	District authorities of Chemnitz and Zwickau
31/32	Württemberg	Free People's State of Württemberg and Administrative District of Sigmaringen
33	Baden	Republic of Baden
34	Hessen-Darmstadt	People's State of Hesse
35	Mecklenburg	Freistaat Mecklenburg-Schwerin, Freistaat Mecklenburg-Strelitz, Hansestadt Lübeck
36	Thüringen	Land Thüringen, Erfurt, the Schmalkalden district of the Kassel administrative district
37	Hamburg, Bremen, Stade	Freie andnd Hansestadt Hamburg, Freie Hansestadt Bremen, Regierungsbezirk Stade
38	Elsaß-Lothringen	Reichsland Elsaß-Lothringen

== Constituencies and constituency associations (1920) ==
This classification was valid for the Reichstag election of 1920.

=== Constituencies ===
No.	Name	Area
1	Ostpreußen	Province of Ostpreußen
2	Berlin	Berlin within its 1919 borders
3	Potsdam II	From the Potsdam administrative district, the districts of Teltow and Beeskow-Storkow, as well as the cities of Charlottenburg, Berlin-Wilmersdorf, Berlin-Schöneberg and Neukölln
4	Potsdam I	Potsdam administrative district excluding the districts and cities belonging to electoral district 3
5	Frankfurt/Oder	Regierungsbezirk Frankfurt, Provinz Grenzmark Posen-Westpreußen Administrative district of Frankfurt, province of Posen–West Prussia
6	Pommern	Province of Pommern
7	Mecklenburg	Freistaat Mecklenburg-Schwerin, Freistaat Mecklenburg-Strelitz, Hansestadt Lübeck
8	Breslau	Breslau administrative district
9	Liegnitz	Liegnitz administrative district
10	Oppeln	Province of Oberschlesien
11	Magdeburg	Administrative district of Magdeburg, Freistaat Anhalt
12	Merseburg	Merseburg administrative district
13	Thüringen	Land Thüringen, Erfurt, the Schmalkalden district of the Kassel administrative district
14	Schleswig-Holstein	Province of Schleswig-Holstein, in Freistaat Oldenburg the Lübeck region
15	Hamburg	Freie und Hansestadt Hamburg
16	Weser-Ems	Administrative districts of Aurich and Osnabrück, the Free State of Oldenburg, and the Free Hanseatic City of Bremen
17	Ost-Hannover	Administrative districts of Stade and Lüneburg
18	Süd-Hannover – Braunschweig	Administrative districts of Hannover and Hildesheim, Freistaat Braunschweig
19	Westfalen-Nord	Administrative districts of Münster and Minden, Freistaat Lippe, Freistaat Schaumburg-Lippe, the district of Grafschaft Schaumburg from the province of Hesse-Nassau, and the district of Pyrmont from the Free State of Waldeck
20	Westfalen-Süd	Arnsberg administrative district
21	Hessen-Nassau	Province of Hessen-Nassau excluding the districts of Schmalkalden and Grafschaft Schaumburg, the Rhine Province, Wetzlar district, Trier administrative district in the Free State of Oldenburg.
22	Hessen-Darmstadt	People's State of Hesse
23	Köln-Aachen	Administrative districts of Cologne and Aachen
24	Koblenz-Trier	Koblenz administrative district excluding the Wetzlar district, Trier administrative district, and the Birkenfeldregion of the Free State of Oldenburg
25	Düsseldorf-Ost	From the administrative district of Düsseldorf, the cities and districts of Düsseldorf, Essen, Barmen, Elberfeld, Solingen, Remscheid, Lennep, Mettmann.
26	Düsseldorf-West	From the administrative district of Düsseldorf, the cities and districts of Neuss, Krefeld, München-Gladbach, Rheydt, Oberhausen, Sterkrade, Duisburg, Hamborn, Mülheim an der Ruhr, Kempen, Grevenbroich, Geldern, Kleve, Rees, Dinslaken, Moers
27	Oberbayern-Schwaben	Administrative districts of Oberbayern and Schwaben
28	Niederbayern-Oberpfalz	Administrative districts of Niederbayern and Oberpfalz
29	Franken	Administrative districts of Mittelfranken, Oberfranken and Unterfranken
30	Pfalz	Pfalz administrative district
31	Dresden-Bautzen	District authorities of Dresden and Bautzen
32	Leipzig	District authority of Leipzig
33	Chemnitz-Zwickau	District authorities of Chemnitz and Zwickau
34	Württemberg	Free People's State of Württemberg and Administrative District of Sigmaringen
35	Baden	Republik Baden

=== Constituency associations ===
Nr.	Name	Associated constituencies
I	East Prussia	1 East Prussia
II	Brandenburg I	2 Berlin, 3 Potsdam II
III	Brandenburg II	4 Potsdam I, 5 Frankfurt/Oder
IV	Pomerania -Mecklenburg	6 Pomerania, 7 Mecklenburg
V	Lower Silesia	8 Breslau, 9 Liegnitz
VI	Upper Silesia	10 Oppeln
VII	Saxony-Thuringia	11 Magdeburg, 12 Merseburg, 13 Thuringia
VIII	Schleswig-Holstein – Hamburg	14 Schleswig-Holstein, 15 Hamburg
IX	Lower Saxony	16 Weser-Ems, 17 East Hanover, 18 South Hanover – Brunswick
X	Westphalia	19 Westphalia-North, 20 Westphalia-South
XI	Hesse	21 Hesse-Nassau, 22 Hesse-Darmstadt
XII	Rhineland-South	23 Cologne-Aachen, 24 Koblenz-Trier
XIII	Rhineland-North	25 Düsseldorf-East 26 Düsseldorf-West
XIV	Southeast Bavaria	27 Upper Bavaria-Swabia, 28 Lower Bavaria-Upper Palatinate
XV	Northwest Bavaria	29 francs, 30 Palatinate
XVI	Saxony	31 Dresden-Bautzen, 32 Leipzig, 33 Chemnitz-Zwickau
XVII	Württemberg-Baden	34 Württemberg, 35 Baden

== Constituencies and constituency associations (1924–1933) ==
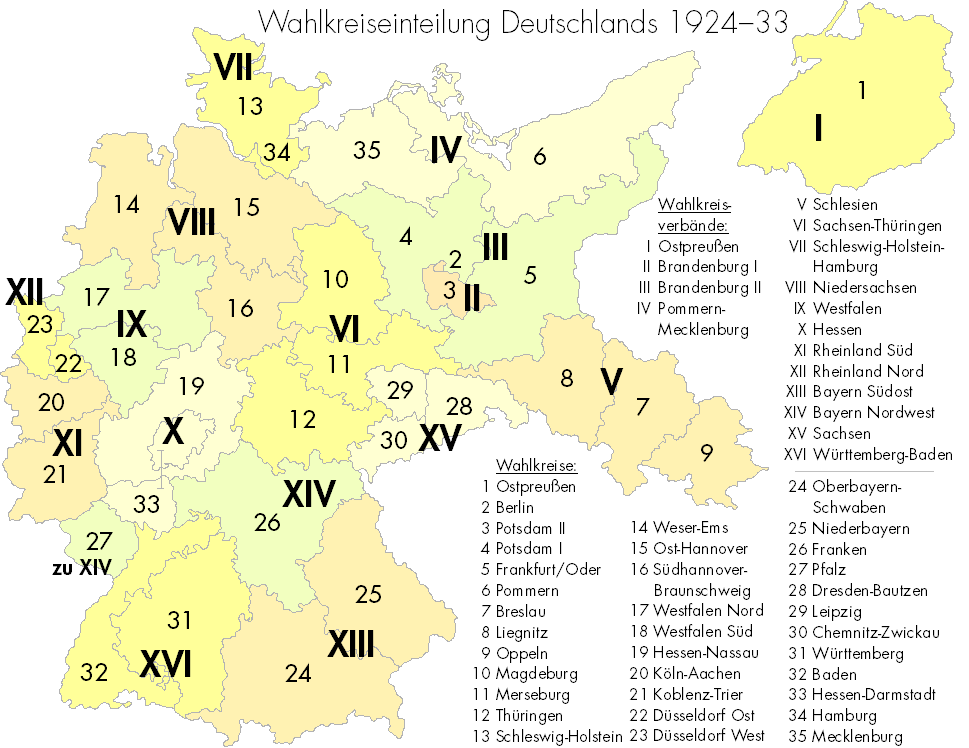
Constituencies and constituency associations 1924–1933

These divisions were valid for the Reichstag elections of 1924 (May), 1924 (December), 1928, 1930 (September), 1932 (July), 1932 (November) and 1933 (March).

=== Constituencies ===
No.	Name	Area
1	East Prussia	Province of Ostpreußen
2	Berlin	From Greater Berlin, the districts of Mitte, Wedding, Prenzlauer Berg, Friedrichshain, Kreuzberg and Tiergarten.
3	Potsdam II	From the Potsdam administrative district, the districts of Teltow and Beeskow-Storkow, as well as the quarters of Zehlendorf, Charlottenburg, Berlin-Wilmersdorf, Schöneberg , Steglitz, Tempelhof and Neukölln, Treptow and Köpenick from Greater Berlin.
4	Potsdam I	The Potsdam administrative district, excluding the districts of Teltow and Beeskow-Storkow, and the districts of Spandau, Reinickendorf, Pankow, Weißensee and Lichtenberg from Greater Berlin.
5	Frankfurt an der Oder	Administrative district of Frankfurt, Province of Grenzmark Posen-Westpreußen
6	Pomerania	Province of Pommern
7	Breslau	Breslau administrative district
8	Liegnitz	Liegnitz administrative district
9	Oppeln	Province of Oberschlesien
10	Magdeburg	Administrative district of Magdeburg in Freistaat Anhalt
11	Merseburg	Merseburg administrative district
12	Thuringia	Land Thüringen, Erfurt, the Schmalkalden district of the Kassel administrative district
13	Schleswig-Holstein	Province of Schleswig-Holstein, in Freistaat Oldenburg the Lübeck region
14	Weser-Ems	Administrative districts of Aurich and Osnabrück, , from Freistaat Oldenburg and Landesteil Oldenburg, Freie Hansestadt Bremen
15	East Hanover	Administrative districts of Stade and Lüneburg
16	South Hanover–Braunschweig	Administrative districts of Hanover and Hildesheim, Free State of Brunswick
17	Westphalia North	Administrative districts of Münster and Minden, Freistaat Lippe, Freistaat Schaumburg-Lippe, the district of Grafschaft Schaumburg from the province of Hesse-Nassau
18	Westphalia South	Arnsberg administrative district
19	Hesse-Nassau	Province of Hesse-Nassau excluding the districts of Schmalkalden and Grafschaft Schaumburg, the district of Wetzlar from the Rhine Province, Free State of Waldeck.
20	Cologne–Aachen	Administrative districts of Cologne and Aachen
21	Koblenz–Trier	Koblenz administrative district excluding the Wetzlar district, Trier administrative district, and the Birkenfeldregion of the Free State of Oldenburg.
22	Düsseldorf East	From the administrative district of Düsseldorf, the cities and districts of Düsseldorf, Essen, Barmen, Elberfeld, Solingen, Remscheid, Lennep, Mettmann.
23	Düsseldorf West	From the administrative district of Düsseldorf, the cities and districts of Neuss, Krefeld, München-Gladbach, Rheydt, Oberhausen, Sterkrade, Duisburg, Hamborn, Mülheim an der Ruhr, Kempen, Grevenbroich, Geldern, Kleve, Rees, Dinslaken, Moers
24	Upper Bavaria–Swabia	Administrative districts of Oberbayern and Schwaben
25	Lower Bavaria–Upper Palatinate	Administrative districts of Niederbayern and Oberpfalz
26	Franconia	Administrative districts of Mittelfranken, Oberfranken and Unterfranken
27	Palatinate	Pfalz administrative district
28	Dresden–Bautzen	Kreishauptmannschaft Dresden and Kreishauptmannschaft Bautzen
29	Leipzig	Kreishauptmannschaft Leipzig
30	Chemnitz–Zwickau	District authorities of Chemnitz and Zwickau
31	Württemberg	Volksstaat Württemberg and Administrative District of Sigmaringen
32	Baden	Republik Baden
33	Hesse-Darmstadt	Volksstaat Hessen
34	Hamburg	Free and Hanseatic City of Hamburg
35	Mecklenburg	Freistaat Mecklenburg-Schwerin, Freistaat Mecklenburg-Strelitz, Hansestadt Lübeck

=== Constituency associations ===
No.	Name	Associated constituencies
I	Ostpreußen	1 Ostpreußen
II	Brandenburg I	2 Berlin, 3 Potsdam II
III	Brandenburg II	4 Potsdam I, 5 Frankfurt/Oder
IV	Pommern-Mecklenburg	6 Pommern, 35 Mecklenburg
V	Schlesien	7 Breslau, 8 Liegnitz, 9 Oppeln
VI	Sachsen-Thüringen	10 Magdeburg, 11 Merseburg, 12 Thüringen
VII	Schleswig-Holstein – Hamburg	13 Schleswig-Holstein, 34 Hamburg
VIII	Niedersachsen	14 Weser-Ems, 15 Osthannover, 16 Süd-Hannover – Braunschweig
IX	Westfalen	17 Westfalen-Nord, 18 Westfalen-Süd
X	Hessen	19 Hessen-Nassau, 33 Hessen-Darmstadt
XI	Rheinland-Süd	20 Köln-Aachen, 21 Koblenz-Trier
XII	Rheinland-Nord	22 Düsseldorf-Ost 23 Düsseldorf-West
XIII	Bayern-Südost	24 Oberbayern-Schwaben, 25 Niederbayern-Oberpfalz
XIV	Bayern-Nordwest	26 Franken, 27 Pfalz
XV	Sachsen	28 Dresden-Bautzen, 29 Leipzig, 30 Chemnitz-Zwickau
XVI	Württemberg-Baden	31 Württemberg, 32 Baden

== See also ==
- List of Bundestag constituencies
