= 1925 German presidential election =

- 29 March 1925 (first round); 26 April 1925 (second round)
- Turnout: 68.87% (first round); 77.56% (second round)
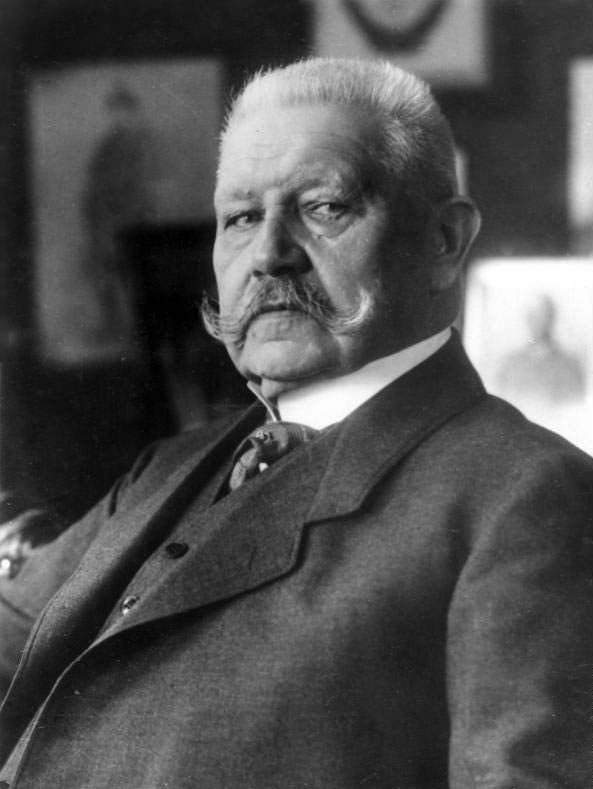

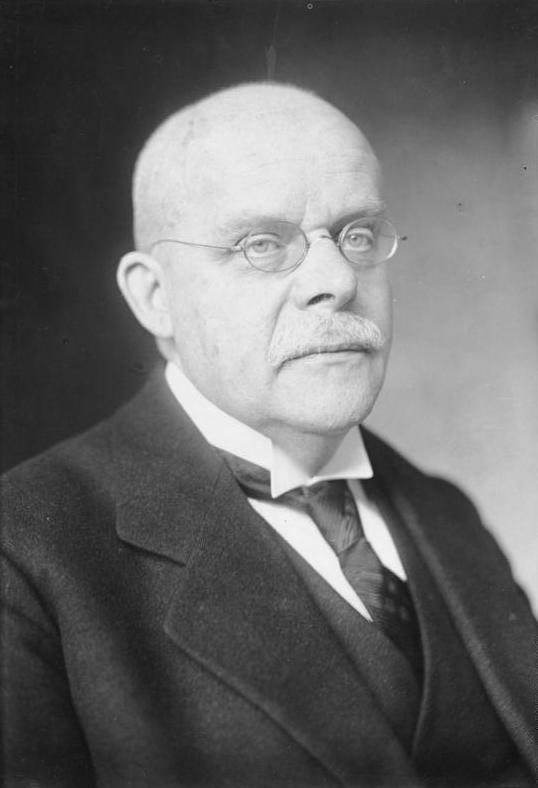

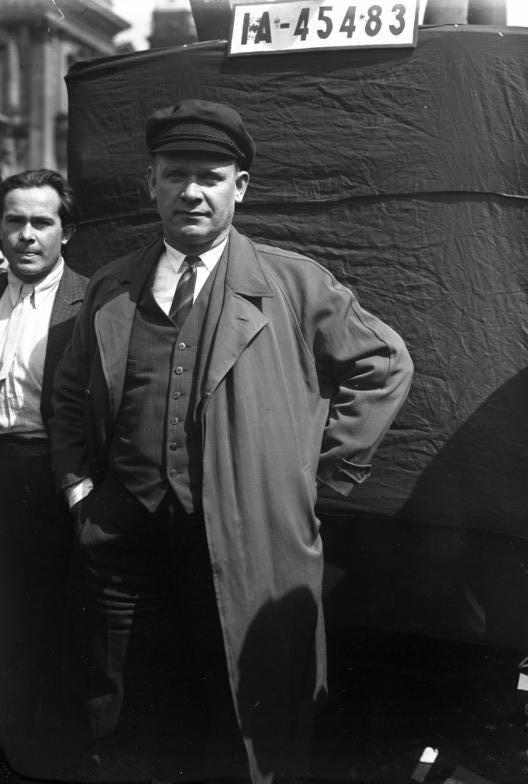
Candidate	Paul von Hindenburg	Wilhelm Marx	Ernst Thälmann
Party	Independent; Supported by: Reichsblock: DNVP; DVP; BVP; NSDAP; WP; BB; DHP	Centre; Supported by: Volksblock: SPD; Centre; DDP	KPD
Popular vote	14,655,641	13,751,605	1,931,151
Percentage	48.29%	45.31%	6.36%
President before election
Friedrich Ebert (Note: Ebert died on 28 February 1925, and Walter Simons became acting president)
SPD
(Acting president Walter Simons
Independent)
Elected President
Paul von Hindenburg
Independent

A presidential election was held in Germany on 29 March 1925, with a runoff on 26 April. It was the first direct election to the office of president of Germany (Reichspräsident), the head of state of the Weimar Republic, and followed the death in office of Friedrich Ebert. The first round of the election included seven candidates and resulted in no clear frontrunner. In the second round, the centrist parties united around Wilhelm Marx of the Catholic Centre Party, while the parties of the Right convinced former field marshal Paul von Hindenburg, who had not run in the first round, to enter the contest. He won with 48.3% of the vote.

== Background ==
Germany's first president, Friedrich Ebert of the Social Democratic Party (SPD), was elected indirectly by the Weimar National Assembly on 11 February 1919. The Weimar Constitution, which became effective six months later, required that the president be elected by the "whole German people". The first regular presidential election was to have taken place in 1920, but it was repeatedly postponed because of Germany's continuing political unrest. In late 1922, the Reichstag extended Ebert's term to 30 June 1925, a change which required amending Article 180 of the constitution.

When Ebert died in office on 28 February 1925, Chancellor Hans Luther, an independent, took over the duties of the office under Article 51 of the Weimar Constitution. The Law on the Deputization of the Reich President of 10 March 1925 then made the president of the Reich Court, Walter Simons, acting president of Germany. The election was scheduled for 29 March 1925.

== Electoral system ==
The president was directly elected by universal adult suffrage for a term of seven years.

The Weimar Republic used a modified two-round system for the election of the president. If no candidate received an absolute majority of votes in the first round, a second ballot would take place in which the candidate with a plurality of votes would be elected. There was no prohibition against a candidate who had not run in the first round being nominated for the second.

== First round ==
=== Candidates ===
Ebert died four months before his term was due to expire. Up to that point, there had been little discussion of a possible successor, and only a month was allotted to select candidates and hold the campaign. The centrist parties recognized the advantage of fielding a joint candidate but were unable to overcome their divisions. The parties to the Right, the German National People's Party (DNVP) and German People's Party (DVP), wanted chiefly to keep the presidency out of the hands of the Social Democrats and were willing to work with the German Democratic Party (DDP) and Centre Party to do so. Defense Minister Otto Gessler of the DDP was proposed as a compromise candidate, but Foreign Minister Gustav Stresemann of the DVP opposed him out of concern that choosing a defense minister would negatively affect Germany's foreign policy. In the end, only three right-of-center parties were able to unite around a common candidate. The seven first round candidates, in order of finish, were:

- German National People's Party, German People's Party, Economic Party: Karl Jarres, former vice-chancellor of Germany (38.8%)
- Social Democratic Party: Otto Braun, former minister-president of Prussia (29.0%)
- Centre Party: Wilhelm Marx, former chancellor of Germany (14.5%)
- Communist Party (KPD): Ernst Thälmann, member of the Reichstag (7.0%)
- German Democratic Party: Willy Hellpach, state president of Baden (5.8%)
- Bavarian People's Party (BVP): Heinrich Held, minister-president of Bavaria (3.8%)
- German Völkisch Freedom Party (DVFP): Erich Ludendorff, former general, member of the Reichstag (1.1%)

The German-Hanoverian Party supported Heinrich Held. Most völkisch movement parties supported Jarres as a compromise candidate, although Adolf Hitler and the Nazi Party (NSDAP) supported Ludendorff.

=== Results ===
The frontrunners in the highly fragmented election were the candidates of the Right (Jarres) and Left (Braun). While the total votes for the Centre Party (-5.6%) and DDP (-18.3%) dropped from the Reichstag election of December 1924, the parties of the far Left and far Right fell considerably more in percentage terms. The Communist Party's vote total dropped by 30.9%, and the far Right's showing was down 68.5%. It was a continuation of the trend towards de-radicalization that had become visible between the closely spaced Reichstag elections in May and December 1924 and can be attributed to the economic stabilization that was taking place at the time. Given the relatively low turnout for the first round of the presidential election (69% as compared to 79% in the December Reichstag election), it is likely that many who had voted for the Communist Party or the far right National Socialist Freedom Movement in 1924 stayed away from the polls on 29 March 1925.

== Second round ==
The formation of united blocs was even more important in the second round because the candidate with the most votes, even if not over 50%, won the election. The parties of the Weimar Coalition – SPD, DDP, and Centre – knew that unity was their only chance of defeating the candidate chosen by the Right. The SPD, which was aware that its endorsement carried significant weight only among its own party members, dropped its support of Otto Braun and made a political deal with the Centre Party to support Wilhelm Marx. Braun had resigned as minister-president of Prussia in January after a tied vote of no-confidence against his ministry. A series of indecisive votes in the Prussian Landtag that swung between Marx and Braun then followed. The SPD promised the Centre Party that it would back Marx in the presidential election in exchange for the Centre's support for Braun as minister-president of Prussia. The DDP then joined them in the Volksblock to endorse Marx as candidate for president.

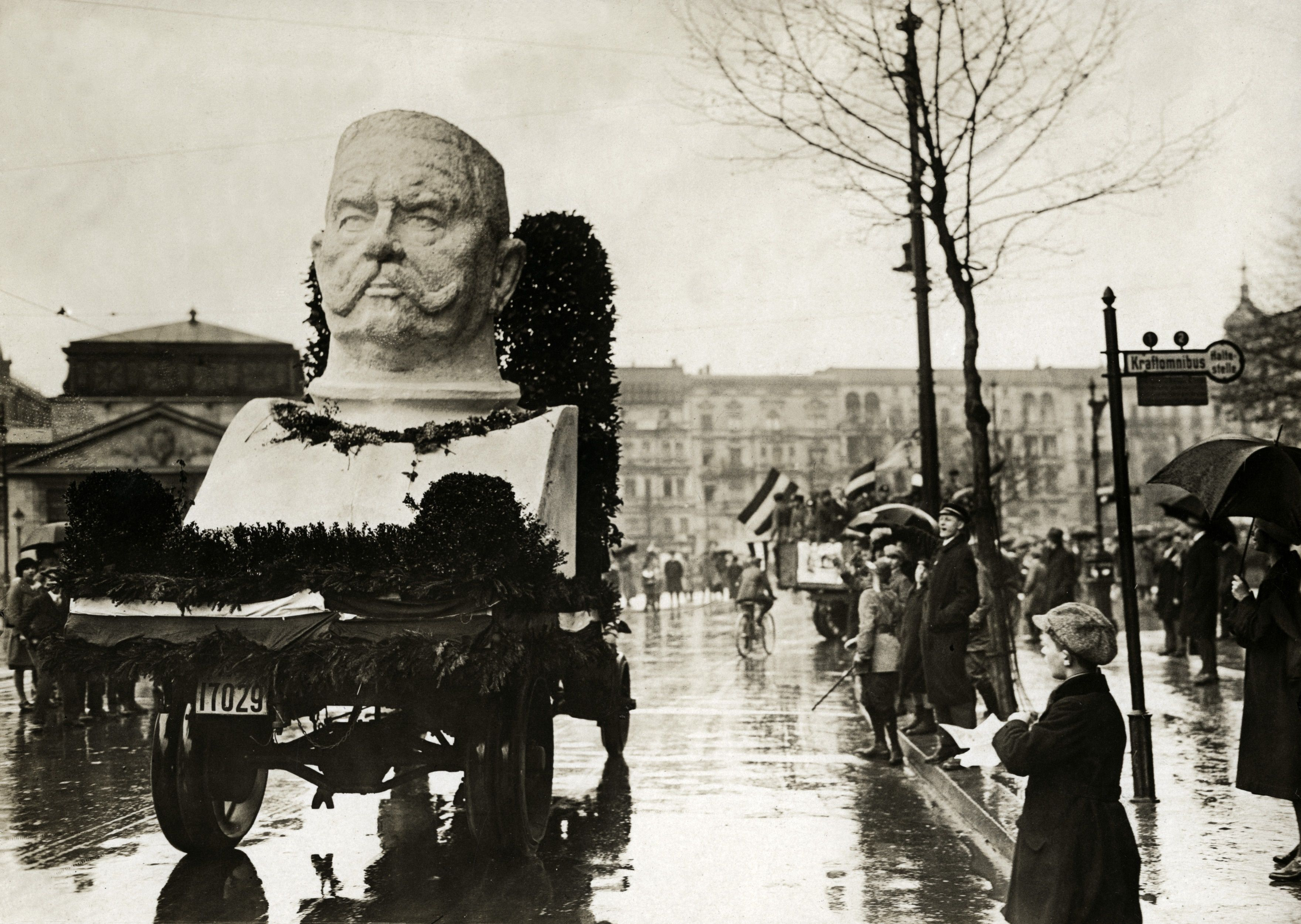
A large bust of Paul von Hindenburg driven through the street as part of campaigning.

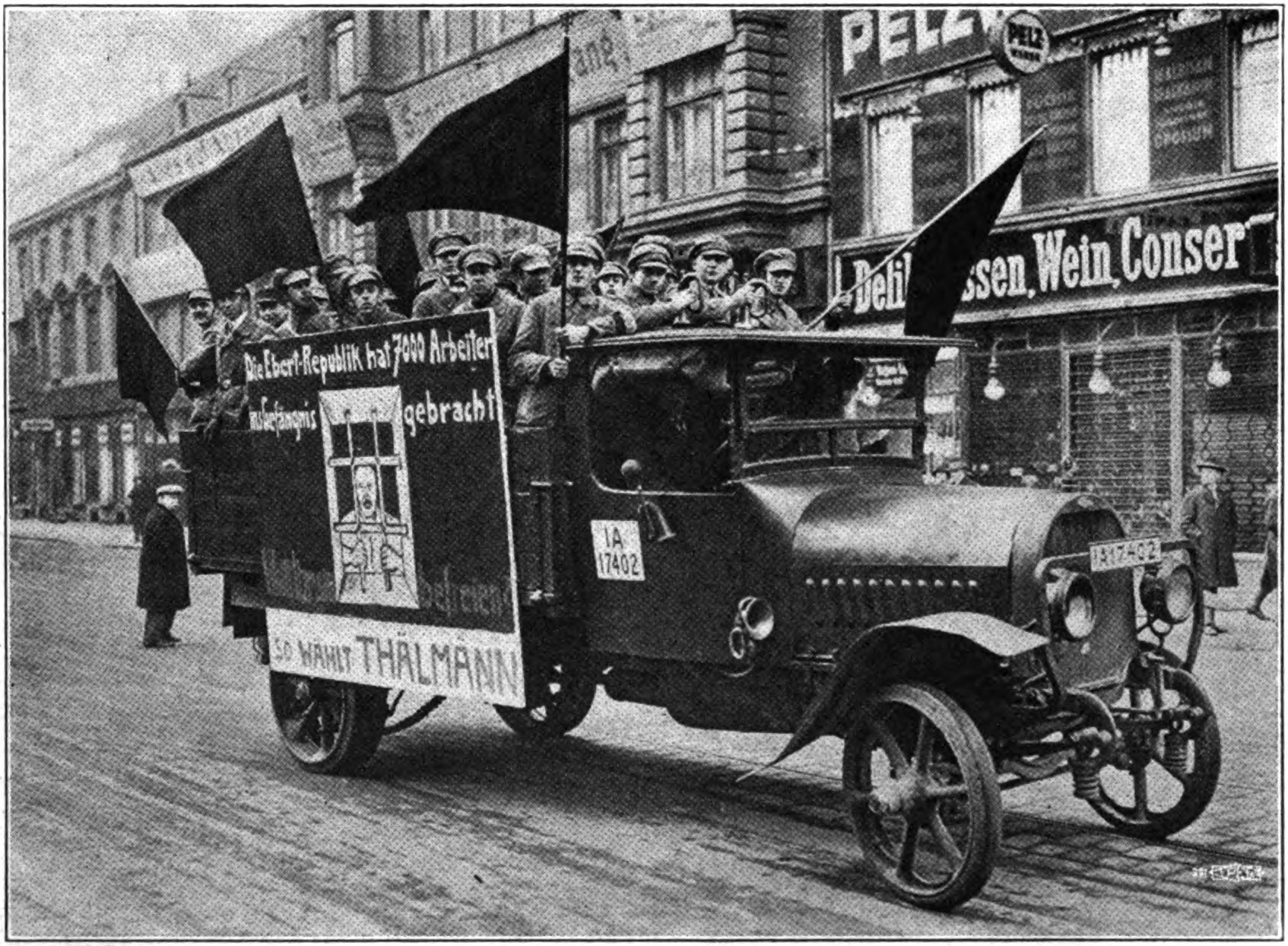
A van with a pro-Thälmann posterboard on its side and supporters flying the Red flag

The parties of the Right united around the 78-year-old World War I field marshal Paul von Hindenburg. In spite of the eventual consensus among the parties to support him, there were misgivings about his candidacy on a number of fronts. Stresemann and the DVP initially opposed him due to worries that the western powers would see him as a provocation. Large industrialists, who bore much of the cost of the campaign and generally were aligned with the DNVP, feared that Hindenburg, whose family owned a large estate east of the Elbe, would favor eastern agrarians. Wilhelm von Gayl of the DNVP expressed concern over whether Hindenburg would be willing to openly violate the constitution as some monarchists and anti-republicans hoped he would. In the end, he was endorsed by all of the parties of the Right, including the German Völkisch Freedom Party (DVFP), the Nazi Party and the Bavarian People's Party. The BVP, which represented heavily Catholic Bavaria, split from the Centre Party and Marx, who was Catholic, because it believed that the Protestant Hindenburg would be more certain to oppose the Social Democrats. Hindenburg, at his own insistence, obtained the approval of former emperor Wilhelm II before he agreed to run for president.

The Communist Party alone put forward its own candidate, Ernst Thälmann, even though the Communist International (Comintern) had urged the KPD not to do so. In an appeal to German workers, the KPD stated that "it is not the task of the proletariat to choose the most skilful representative of bourgeois interests, [or] to choose the lesser evil between the civil dictator Marx and the military dictator Hindenburg... Every class-conscious worker votes against Hindenburg and Marx for Thälmann."

Marx was not considered to be an especially inspired campaigner, and Hindenburg, who had no experience as a politician, made few personal appearances. He addressed only one public meeting, held in Hanover, where he had retired, and gave one radio address. Hindenburg stated that he would uphold the constitution, and his campaign stressed his devotion to "social justice, religious equality [and] genuine peace at home and abroad" and called for a "national community" (Volksgemeinschaft) under his leadership. The parties of the bourgeois Right campaigned for him as a man who stood above party politics and condemned Marx for being too close to the SPD. In the words of Fritz Schäffer of the BVP, Hindenburg's candidacy emerged out of the "misery of Germany's party politics".

=== Results ===
The second round was held on 26 April, with a turnout of 77.6%. Hindenburg won on a plurality of the vote, with 48.3% to Marx's 45.3% and Thälmann's 6.4%. The KPD clearly played a spoiler role in the election – the 27 April headline in the SPD's party newspaper Vorwärts read "Hindenburg by the Grace of Thälmann!" – although Thälmann's votes did not all come from committed KPD members. Religion also was part of many voters' considerations. When compared to the SPD's results in the first round, Marx fared especially poorly in Saxony, where strong anti-clerical sentiment led many SPD voters to turn to Thälmann. In Protestant regions of Württemberg, many liberal and socialist voters turned to Hindenburg for the same reason. In East Prussia, Hindenburg as the victor of the Battle of Tannenberg, which was fought in East Prussia, drew many who had voted for one of the Weimar parties (SPD, DDP and Centre) in the first round. Across Germany as a whole, Hindenburg had more success at bringing first round non-voters to the polls than did Marx. Historian Hans Mommsen attributed Hindenburg's victory to discomfort with the SPD among the middle class and the mobilization of nationalism and anti-Marxist feelings by the Right in the second round:

The election results made it clear that resentment against the Social Democrats had played a central role in the voting behavior of the bourgeois electorate and that in large segments of the German middle class this went hand in hand with the rejection of the parliamentary system. The decisive factor, however, was that of the 3.5 million voters who participated only in the second round of balloting, an estimated 3 million cast their votes for Hindenburg. The mobilization of anti-Marxist and nationalist sentiments thus afforded the political Right access to that dangerous arsenal of non-voters the republican parties could not hope to reach.

Some also attributed Marx's loss to the candidature of Ernst Thälmann of the Communist Party of Germany, who did not drop out in the second round. However, historian Peter Fritzsche rejected this view, calling the claim "far-fetched" and arguing that "given the explicit enmity of this party toward the Weimar "capitalist state," it would have been completely unrealistic to expect the KPD to support the candidate of the Weimar system". Fritsche instead found that the BVP's endorsement of Hindenburg was crucial to Marx's defeat.

== Aftermath ==
In spite of Hindenburg's open monarchism and pressure from some of the men in his inner circle, Hindenburg as president never overtly stepped outside of constitutional bounds during his term in office. After the Great Depression hit Germany in 1929, he allowed Chancellor Heinrich Brüning to govern by presidential decree rather than through the Reichstag, but under Article 48, his actions were within the letter if not necessarily the spirit of the constitution. The 1930 Reichstag election made the Nazi Party the second strongest in the parliament, but its rise was due primarily to the dire economic circumstances under which the nation was suffering. Hindenburg was re-elected president in 1932. He was supported in that election even by the Social Democrats as the only candidate who could defeat Adolf Hitler.

== Vote totals ==
Candidate	Party	First round		Second round	
Candidate	Party	Votes	%	Votes	%
Karl Jarres	German People's Party; German National People's Party; Economic Party	10,416,658	38.77		
Otto Braun	Social Democratic Party	7,802,497	29.04		
Wilhelm Marx	Centre Party (Note: Supported by SPD, Centre, DDP in the second round)	3,887,734	14.47	13,751,605	45.31
Ernst Thälmann	Communist Party	1,871,815	6.97	1,931,151	6.36
Willy Hellpach	German Democratic Party	1,568,398	5.84		
Heinrich Held	Bavarian People's Party (Note: Supported by DHP)	1,007,450	3.75		
Erich Ludendorff	German Völkisch Freedom Party	285,793	1.06		
Paul von Hindenburg	Independent (Note: Supported by DNVP, DVP, BVP, NSDAP, WP, BB, DHP)			14,655,641	48.29
Other candidates		25,761	0.10	13,416	0.04
Total		26,866,106	100.00	30,351,813	100.00
Valid votes		26,866,106	99.44	30,351,813	99.29
Invalid/blank votes		150,654	0.56	216,061	0.71
Total votes		27,016,760	100.00	30,567,874	100.00
Registered voters/turnout		39,226,138	68.87	39,414,316	77.56
Source: Gonschior

=== Results by constituency ===
Winners within each constituency are highlighted in the color representing the party.

Constituency	First round														Second round					
Constituency	Jarres DNVP, DVP, WP		Braun SPD		Marx Centre		Thälmann KPD		Hellpach DDP		Held BVP		Ludendorff DVFP		Hindenburg Reichsblock		Marx Volksblock		Thälmann KPD	
Constituency	Votes	%	Votes	%	Votes	%	Votes	%	Votes	%	Votes	%	Votes	%	Votes	%	Votes	%	Votes	%
1 East Prussia	550,294	58.41	228,012	24.20	70,050	7.44	45,276	4.81	32,759	3.48	2,837	0.30	11,352	1.20	715,093	66.90	302,740	28.32	50,344	4.71
2 Berlin	329,003	30.13	398,510	36.50	56,638	5.19	180,734	16.55	121,390	11.12	1,357	0.12	4,010	0.37	384,361	32.47	654,487	55.29	144,879	12.24
3 Potsdam II	372,996	42.34	261,740	29.71	37,953	4.31	84,516	9.59	118,309	13.43	1,206	0.14	3,977	0.45	427,358	44.22	467,709	48.39	71,206	7.37
4 Potsdam I	394,333	45.93	287,263	33.46	26,188	3.05	84,196	9.81	58,933	6.86	1,784	0.21	5,266	0.61	464,550	49.20	403,596	42.75	75,722	8.02
5 Frankfurt (Oder)	439,818	56.47	227,546	29.22	51,340	6.59	23,319	2.99	27,740	3.56	1,785	0.23	6,499	0.83	532,597	61.47	307,914	35.54	25,513	2.94
6 Pomerania	530,287	63.92	213,942	25.79	10,862	1.31	33,483	4.04	26,929	3.25	2,268	0.27	10,879	1.31	656,822	71.08	224,486	24.29	42,276	4.58
7 Breslau	354,431	39.49	314,880	35.08	167,398	18.65	18,668	2.08	33,439	3.73	2,499	0.28	5,490	0.61	451,792	45.34	520,907	52.28	23,335	2.34
8 Liegnitz	240,523	42.26	204,339	35.90	48,365	8.50	11,667	2.05	59,333	10.42	1,602	0.28	2,904	0.51	321,295	50.47	298,431	46.88	16,629	2.61
9 Oppeln	145,053	30.58	46,391	9.78	220,914	46.57	45,552	9.60	8,980	1.89	2,064	0.44	4,640	0.98	224,914	39.84	293,213	51.94	46,041	8.16
10 Magdeburg	411,748	47.74	347,615	40.30	17,734	2.06	38,670	4.48	37,901	4.39	1,511	0.18	6,677	0.77	485,357	52.21	404,361	43.50	39,584	4.26
11 Merseburg	334,877	50.00	143,680	21.45	10,836	1.62	136,951	20.45	33,195	4.96	1,446	0.22	8,395	1.25	411,234	57.41	164,671	22.99	140,153	19.56
12 Thuringia	496,699	49.07	305,481	30.18	47,224	4.67	101,681	10.05	42,234	4.17	2,159	0.21	15,857	1.57	621,652	55.21	393,621	34.96	110,108	9.78
13 Schleswig-Holstein	373,731	53.18	231,841	32.99	10,398	1.48	37,035	5.27	41,915	5.96	1,715	0.24	5,404	0.77	478,509	59.78	283,379	35.40	38,177	4.77
14 Weser-Ems	227,045	38.02	172,108	28.82	127,345	21.32	19,144	3.21	41,452	6.94	4,737	0.79	4,863	0.81	335,057	46.95	355,227	49.78	23,030	3.23
15 East Hanover	221,367	50.85	142,595	32.76	7,302	1.68	14,289	3.28	14,560	3.34	30,873	7.09	3,526	0.81	336,885	64.05	172,725	32.84	16,026	3.05
16 South Hanover–Braunschweig	386,535	41.55	379,569	40.80	53,094	5.71	28,813	3.10	36,836	3.96	35,942	3.86	8,716	0.94	540,077	50.94	488,544	46.08	31,226	2.95
17 Westphalia North	268,355	27.97	228,155	23.78	379,875	39.60	48,625	5.07	22,613	2.36	3,852	0.40	6,892	0.72	389,507	35.44	660,770	60.13	48,267	4.39
18 Westphalia South	320,109	27.50	320,581	27.55	350,105	30.08	108,686	9.34	52,245	4.49	3,083	0.26	8,157	0.70	461,725	35.67	737,311	56.97	94,922	7.33
19 Hesse-Nassau	383,931	36.11	347,647	32.70	193,695	18.22	43,924	4.13	80,484	7.57	4,022	0.38	8,576	0.81	546,580	44.96	622,037	51.17	46,502	3.83
20 Cologne-Aachen	140,202	17.50	142,960	17.84	429,945	53.66	51,675	6.45	25,661	3.20	3,861	0.48	6,259	0.78	212,795	22.84	670,238	71.94	48,278	5.18
21 Koblenz-Trier	100,172	21.29	57,996	12.33	280,929	59.72	12,420	2.64	11,466	2.44	2,561	0.54	3,998	0.85	166,151	30.59	362,622	66.76	14,015	2.58
22 Düsseldorf East	296,687	34.06	160,616	18.44	227,266	26.09	151,676	17.41	24,782	2.85	1,872	0.21	7,273	0.84	410,664	41.07	441,654	44.16	147,527	14.75
23 Düsseldorf West	174,808	25.58	115,614	16.92	304,263	44.52	67,603	9.89	13,351	1.95	2,489	0.36	4,931	0.72	252,830	32.83	455,808	59.19	61,165	7.94
24 Upper Bavaria–Swabia	200,085	23.52	183,845	21.61	11,461	1.35	25,562	3.00	20,965	2.46	372,778	43.81	33,890	3.98	630,348	65.42	306,161	31.77	26,549	2.76
25 Lower Bavaria–Upper Palatinate	36,481	10.66	44,754	13.08	10,175	2.97	7,300	2.13	6,431	1.88	227,215	66.41	8,738	2.55	260,721	67.98	113,543	29.60	8,736	2.28
26 Franconia	355,635	36.69	278,354	28.72	13,835	1.43	23,318	2.41	36,512	3.77	227,950	23.52	32,399	3.34	673,243	58.69	447,529	39.01	25,769	2.25
27 Palatinate	90,074	29.26	87,512	28.43	39,771	12.92	23,575	7.66	19,777	6.43	43,099	14.00	3,674	1.19	166,873	45.29	179,232	48.64	22,188	6.02
28 Dresden–Bautzen	396,242	43.44	366,081	40.14	17,557	1.92	36,636	4.02	88,088	9.66	2,099	0.23	5,079	0.56	511,213	51.49	416,036	41.90	65,148	6.56
29 Leipzig	267,707	40.05	275,551	41.23	6,501	0.97	67,663	10.12	44,424	6.65	1,884	0.28	4,346	0.65	332,075	48.04	276,464	39.99	82,206	11.89
30 Chemnitz–Zwickau	360,616	44.29	292,761	35.96	7,380	0.91	99,864	12.26	36,733	4.51	2,301	0.28	14,228	1.75	490,277	53.63	284,600	31.13	138,647	15.16
31 Württemberg	348,640	34.72	206,518	20.57	241,525	24.05	56,521	5.63	137,059	13.65	3,971	0.40	9,023	0.90	544,104	45.73	588,027	49.42	57,056	4.80
32 Baden	241,357	27.62	198,494	22.71	295,183	33.78	39,152	4.48	88,091	10.08	3,744	0.43	6,508	0.74	375,272	35.63	635,787	60.36	41,578	3.95
33 Hesse-Darmstadt	188,108	33.26	210,545	37.22	98,491	17.41	20,951	3.70	42,351	7.49	1,689	0.30	3,271	0.58	274,384	41.33	366,321	55.18	22,998	3.46
34 Hamburg	214,200	36.86	214,888	36.98	12,368	2.13	67,566	11.63	65,415	11.26	1,504	0.26	4,603	0.79	294,156	45.63	281,312	43.64	68,718	10.66
35 Mecklenburg	224,509	52.07	164,113	38.06	3,768	0.87	15,104	3.50	16,045	3.72	1,691	0.39	5,493	1.27	275,170	59.55	170,142	36.82	16,633	3.60
Total	10,416,658	38.77	7,802,497	29.04	3,887,734	14.47	1,871,815	6.97	1,568,398	5.84	1,007,450	3.75	285,793	1.06	14,655,641	48.29	13,751,605	45.31	1,931,151	6.36

== See also ==
- Presidential cabinets of the Weimar Republic

== Works cited ==
- Cary, Noel D. "The making of the reich president, 1925: German conservatism and the nomination of Paul von Hindenburg." Central European History 23.2-3 (1990): 179-204. online
- Graper, Elmer (1925). "The German Presidential Election". American Political Science Review. 19 (3). American Political Science Association: 592–600. doi:10.2307/2939137. JSTOR 2939137.
- Orlow, Dietrich (1969). The History of the Nazi Party: 1919-1933. University of Pittsburgh Press. SBN 822931834.
