= Reichstag (Weimar Republic) =

Legislative body of the Weimar Republic

German Reichstag Deutscher Reichstag
- Legislative body of Germany

History
- Established: 6 February 1919; 107 years ago
- Disbanded: 23 March 1933
- Preceded by: Weimar National Assembly
- Succeeded by: Greater German Reichstag
- Seats: 647 (at dissolution)

Elections
- Voting system: Closed list proportional representation
- First election: 6 June 1920
- Last election: 5 March 1933

Meeting place
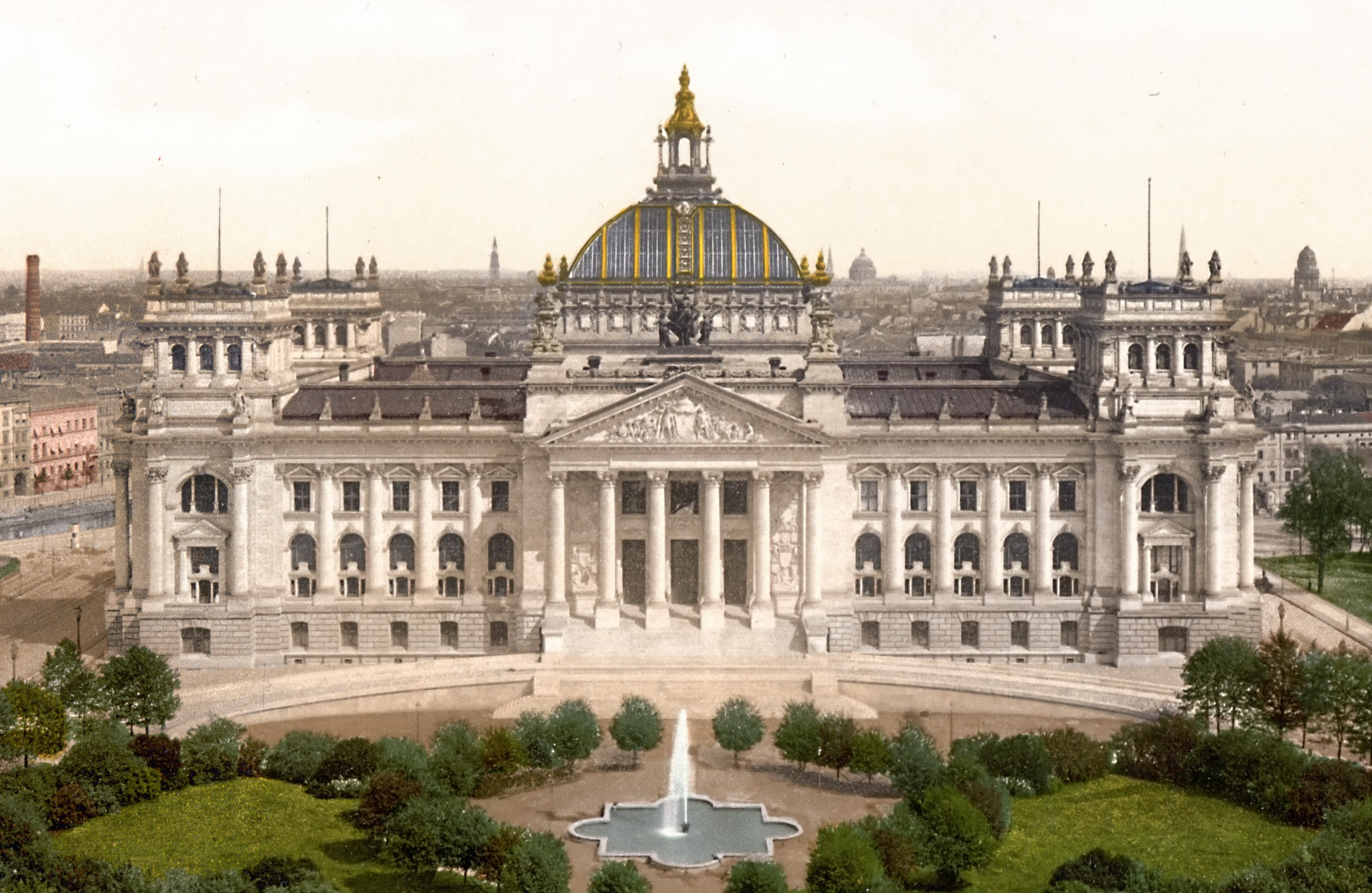
- Reichstag building, Berlin

Constitution
- Weimar Constitution

The Reichstag of the Weimar Republic (1919–1933) was Germany's parliament. The Reichstag convened for the first time on 24 June 1920, taking over from the Weimar National Assembly, which had served as an interim parliament following the collapse of the German Empire in November 1918. Its counterpart, representing the states, was the Reichsrat.

Under the Weimar Constitution of 1919, the Reichstag was elected every four years by universal, equal, secret and direct suffrage, using a system of party-list proportional representation. All citizens who had reached the age of 20 were allowed to vote, including women but excluding soldiers on active duty. The Reichstag voted on the laws of the Reich and was responsible for the budget, questions of war and peace, and confirmation of state treaties. Oversight of the Reich government (the ministers responsible for executing the laws) also resided with the Reichstag. It could force individual ministers or the entire government to resign by means of a vote of no confidence, and under Article 48 of the constitution it could rescind emergency decrees issued by the President. The President could dissolve the Reichstag under Article 25 of the constitution, but only once for the same reason.

The Reichstag as a free and democratic institution ceased to exist following the passage of the Enabling Act of 1933 which granted Adolf Hitler's government the power to draft and enforce laws as he pleased.

== Responsibilities ==
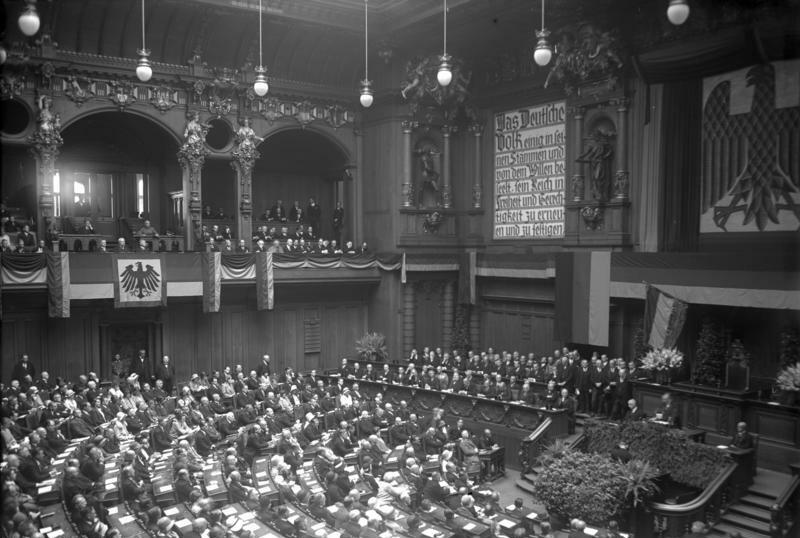
The hall where the Reichstag met

The main rights, duties and responsibilities of the Reichstag were defined in the Weimar Constitution. (All references to constitutional articles can be found in the footnoted English translation).

- The Reichstag voted on proposed laws of the Reich, including budget laws (Article 85).
- It raised extraordinary loans (Article 87) and handled petitions (Article 126).
- It declared war and made peace (Article 45, II). Alliances and treaties with foreign states required Reichstag approval if they related to subjects of Reich legislation (Article 45, III).
- The enactment of a law could be suspended for two months if one-third of the Reichstag voted to do so. The majority could, in turn, declare it urgent, following which the Reich president could enact the law regardless of the request for suspension (Article 72).
- The Reichstag had the right of self-government; it created its own rules of procedure.
- The Reichstag could interrupt the order of the day by demanding an explanation from the minister concerned and address minor questions and written requests for information to the Reich government (§§ 55–62 and 67 Rules of Procedure).
- The Reichstag and its committees could demand the presence of any cabinet member (Article 33).
- The minister of finance was required to give an of account of the use of Reich revenues to the Reichstag (Article 86).
- The Reichstag could force the resignation of the government through a vote of no confidence (Article 54).
- It could bring charges against the chancellor, the ministers or the Reich president for culpably violating the constitution or a Reich law (Article 59).
- The Reich president could be removed from office by a popular referendum upon a resolution approved by a two-thirds majority of the Reichstag (Article 43, II).
- The Reichstag could suspend emergency measures taken by the Reich president (Article 48, III & IV) and could establish committees of inquiry (Article 35, I).
- It formed a standing committee to exercise the rights of the people's representatives with respect to the Reich government for periods when the Reichstag was not in session and after the end of an electoral term. The committee had the rights of a committee of inquiry (Article 35, II and III).
- It formed a permanent, non-public committee on foreign affairs, also with the rights of a committee of inquiry (Article 35, I and III, and § 34, I, Rules of Procedure).
- A tribunal to examine election returns was formed from members of the Reichstag and from judges of the Reich Administrative Court (Reichsverwaltungsgericht) (Article 31).

== Electoral system ==
Each voter had one vote, which was cast on an electoral district ballot. The number of seats was determined by proportional representation. The number of Reichstag seats fluctuated because they depended on the total number of votes cast, with one seat allocated for 60,000 votes. In 1919 the Weimar National Assembly consisted of 421 members; in 1933 the last Reichstag had 647.

=== Eligible voters and voting procedures ===
In the election to the Weimar National Assembly, the group of eligible voters expanded considerably, from 14,441,400 in 1912 (the last Reichstag election under the Empire) to 37,362,100 in 1919, primarily because women had been given the right to vote and the voting age was lowered from 25 to 20. Those who could not exercise the right to vote were active duty soldiers, people living in a sanatorium or nursing home and those in criminal or pre-trial detention. Citizenship had to have been obtained at least one year before election day. The election date was set by the Reich president. After November 1918 it had to be a Sunday or a public holiday, in accordance with a long-standing social democratic demand.

Map showing the 35 electoral districts and 16 associations (Roman numerals)

The Reich was divided into 35 electoral districts (sg. Wahlkreis) that were combined into 16 electoral associations (sg. Wahlkreisverband). The parties drew up a list of candidates for each electoral district in which they were participating and also a list of candidates at the Reich level.

A district received one seat for every 60,000 votes cast for a list, with the first 60,000 votes going to the first candidate on the list (as ranked by the party), the second 60,000 to the second candidate, and so on. Residual votes were transferred to the level of the electoral association. There, the remaining votes from the districts making up the association were added together; for a full 60,000 votes, there was one seat from the district list that had contributed the most residual votes. Any additional remaining votes were carried over to the national level where a party again received one seat (from the national list) per 60,000 votes.

A number of additional rules were added to this basic procedure. The most important was that a party could win seats only if it had received 30,000 or more votes in at least one district. Furthermore, a national list could deliver only as many seats as the party had already received in total at the lower levels. These provisions disadvantaged small parties without a regional focus. They nevertheless also resulted in a large number of parties being represented in the Reichstag. Beyond the 30,000 vote hurdle there was no minimum threshold (such as the 5% threshold of second votes in modern Germany) for a party to enter the Reichstag.

=== List of constituencies ===
The following is a list of constituencies as they existed from 1924 onwards.

Number	Name	Boundaries	Constituency association
1	East Prussia	Province of East Prussia	I
2	Berlin	Berlin in its boundaries before the Greater Berlin Act (the Greater Berlin boroughs of Kreuzberg, Wedding, Friedrichshain, Prenzlauer Berg, Tiergarten, and Mitte)	II
3	Potsdam II	Districts of Teltow and Beeskow-Storkow, Cities of Charlottenburg, Wilmersdorf, Schöneberg, Neukölln, and Köpenick After the Greater Berlin Act: Districts of Teltow and Beeskow-Storkow, Berlin boroughs of Zehlendorf, Charlottenburg, Wilmersdorf, Schöneberg, Steglitz, Tempelhof, Neukölln, Treptow, and Köpenick	II
4	Potsdam I	Regierungsbezirk of Potsdam without the districts of Teltow and Beeskow-Storkow and the cities of Charlottenburg, Wilmersdorf, Schöneberg, Neukölln, and Köpenick After the Greater Berlin Act: Regierungsbezirk of Potsdam without the districts of Teltow and Beeskow-Storkow, and Berlin boroughs of Spandau, Reinickendorf, Pankow, Weißensee, and Lichtenberg	III
5	Frankfurt an der Oder	Regierungsbezirk of Frankfurt, Province of Posen–West Prussia	III
6	Pomerania	Province of Pomerania	IV
7	Breslau	Regierungsbezirk of Breslau	V
8	Liegnitz	Regierungsbezirk of Liegnitz	V
9	Oppeln	Province of Upper Silesia	V
10	Magdeburg	Regierungsbezirk of Magdeburg, Free State of Anhalt	VI
11	Merseburg	Regierungsbezirk of Merseburg	VI
12	Thuringia	State of Thuringia, Regierungsbezirk of Erfurt, district of Schmalkalden	VI
13	Schleswig-Holstein	Province of Schleswig-Holstein, Landesteil of Lübeck	VII
14	Weser-Ems	Regierungsbezirke of Aurich and Osnabrück, Free State of Oldenburg without the Landesteile of Lübeck and Birkenfeld, Free Hanseatic City of Bremen	VIII
15	East Hanover	Regierungsbezirke of Stade and Lüneburg	VIII
16	South Hanover–Braunschweig	Regierungsbezirke of Hanover and Hildesheim, Free State of Brunswick	VIII
17	Westphalia North	Regierungsbezirke of Münster and Minden, Free State of Lippe, Free State of Schaumburg-Lippe, district of Schaumburg	IX
18	Westphalia South	Regierungsbezirk of Arnsberg	IX
19	Hesse-Nassau	Province of Hesse-Nassau without the districts of Schmalkalden and Schaumburg, district of Wetzlar, Free State of Waldeck	X
20	Cologne–Aachen	Regierungsbezirke of Cologne and Aachen	XI
21	Koblenz–Trier	Regierungsbezirk of Koblenz without the district of Wetzlar, Regierungsbezirk of Trier, Landesteile of Birkenfeld	XI
22	Düsseldorf East	City of Essen, District of Essen, City of Düsseldorf, District of Düsseldorf, City of Elberfeld, City of Barmen, District of Mettmann, City of Remscheid, District of Lennep, City of Solingen, District of Solingen	XII
23	Düsseldorf West	District of Cleve, District of Rees, City of Crefeld, District of Crefeld, City of Duisburg, City of Oberhausen, City of Mülheim, City of Hamborn, City of Sterkrade, District of Dinslaken, District of Mörs, District of Geldern, District of Kempen, City of Neuß, District of Neuß, District of Grevenbroich, City of München-Gladbach, City of Rheydt, District of Gladbach	XII
24	Upper Bavaria–Swabia	Regierungsbezirke of Upper Bavaria and Swabia	XIII
25	Lower Bavaria–Upper Palatinate	Regierungsbezirke of Lower Bavaria and Upper Palatinate	XIII
26	Franconia	Regierungsbezirke of Middle Franconia, Upper Franconia, and Lower Franconia	XIV
27	Palatinate	Regierungsbezirk of Palatinate	XIV
28	Dresden–Bautzen	Kreishauptmannschaften of Dresden and Bautzen	XV
29	Leipzig	Kreishauptmannschaft of Leipzig	XV
30	Chemnitz–Zwickau	Kreishauptmannschaften of Chemnitz and Zwickau	XV
31	Württemberg	Free People's State of Württemberg, Regierungsbezirk of Sigmaringen	XVI
32	Baden	Republic of Baden	XVI
33	Hesse-Darmstadt	People's State of Hesse	X
34	Hamburg	Free and Hanseatic City of Hamburg (in its boundaries before the Greater Hamburg Act, i.e. without Altona, Wandsbek, and Harburg)	VII
35	Mecklenburg	Free State of Mecklenburg-Schwerin, Free State of Mecklenburg-Strelitz, Free and Hanseatic City of Lübeck	IV

Constituencies 1 to 23 were also used for elections for the Landtag of Prussia, albeit naturally excluding their territories located in other states.

== Presidents and Council of Elders ==
The Reichstag president and his deputies (the Presidium) were elected by Reichstag members at the beginning of the legislative period. According to parliamentary custom, a representative of the strongest party in the Reichstag was usually elected president.

Presidents of the Reichstag (1919–1945)
No.	Name	Party	Start of Term	End of Term	Time in Office
1	Eduard David (1863–1930)	SPD	7 February 1919	13 February 1919	6 days
2	Constantin Fehrenbach (1852–1926)	Centre	14 February 1919	21 June 1920	1 year, 128 days
3	Paul Löbe (1875–1967)	SPD	25 June 1920	28 May 1924	3 years, 338 days
4	Max Wallraf (1859–1941)	DNVP	28 May 1924	7 January 1925	224 days
5	Paul Löbe (1875–1967)	SPD	7 January 1925	30 August 1932	7 years, 236 days
6	Hermann Göring (1893–1946)	NSDAP	30 August 1932	23 April 1945	12 years, 236 days

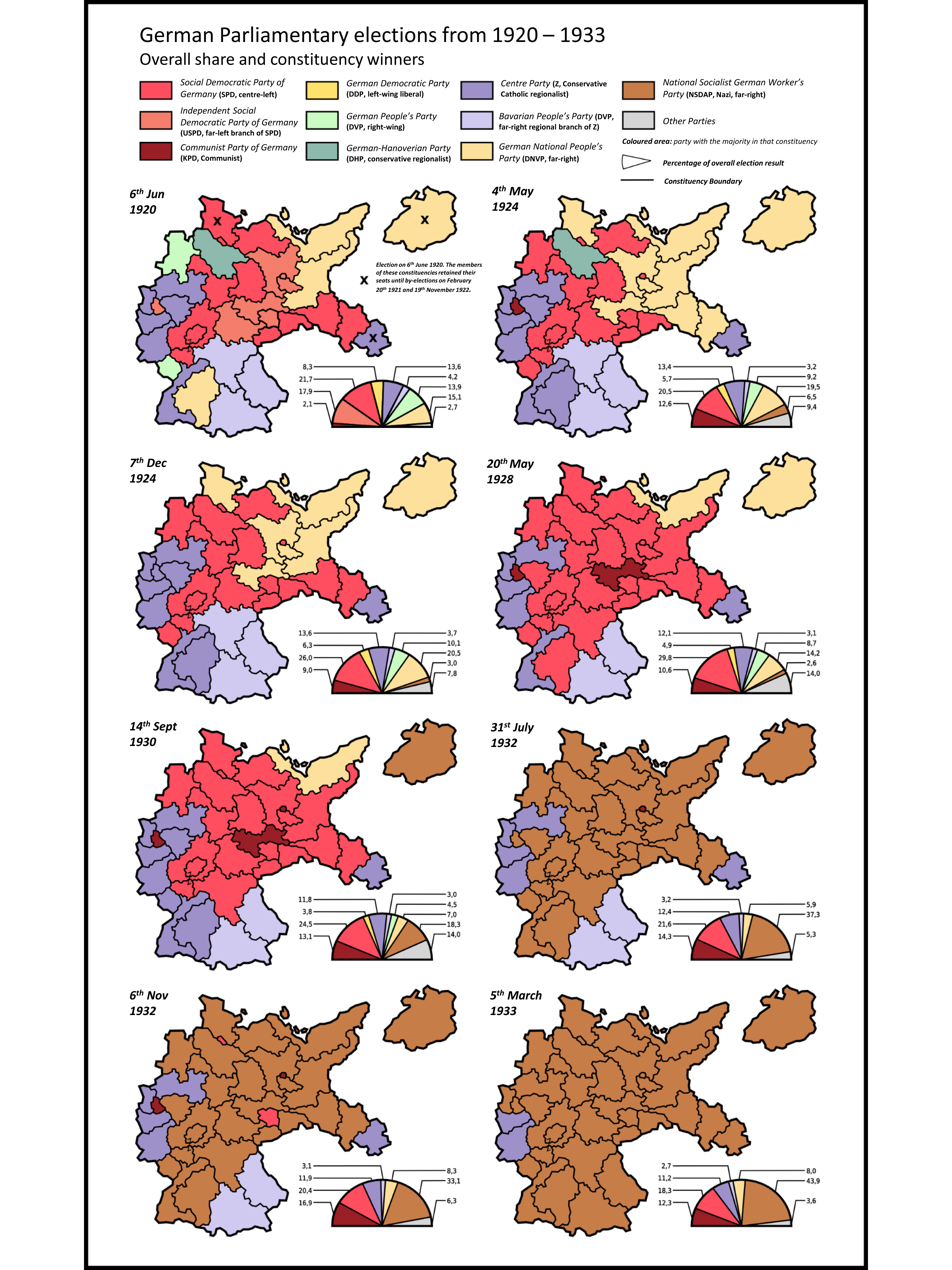
Election results by district and party, 1920 to 1933

The Presidium was supported by the Council of Elders (Ältestenrat). The body consisted of the Reichstag president, the deputy presidents and a total of twenty-one members appointed by the Reichstag parties. Those appointed usually included the party chairmen. The Council of Elders was chaired and convened by the president or his deputies. The body was responsible for reaching agreement among the parties on agendas and work plans. These agreements were not, however, legally binding. The Council of Elders also determined the chairmen of the committees and their deputies as well as certain other organizational issues. In spite of its limited powers, the Council of Elders had considerable importance for the functioning of parliament. In essence, its tasks were comparable to those of the Ältestenrat in the modern German Bundestag.

== Election results ==
Between 1919 and 1933 there was one election to the constituent National Assembly and eight to the Reichstag. While parties of the political center dominated in 1919 (the Social Democratic Party of Germany (SPD), Centre Party and German Democratic Party (DDP)), the party spectrum of the Weimar Republic was characterized by fragmentation and, towards the end, increasing radicalization (the Communist Party of Germany (KPD) and the Nazi Party (NSDAP)).

Reichstag Election Results 1919–1933 % of votes / # of members
Date	KPD	USPD	SPD	Centre	BVP	DDP	DVP	DNVP	NSDAP	Others	Women	Turnout
19 January 1919 (Note: Election for the Weimar National Assembly.)	—	7.6% 22	37.9% 163	19.7% 91	—	18.6% 75	4.4% 19	10.3% 44	—	1.5% 7	8.7% 37	83.0% 421
6 June 1920	2.1% 4	17.6% 83	21.9% 103	13.6% 64	4.2% 20	8.4% 39	14.0% 65	15.1% 71	—	3.4% 10	8.0% 37	79.0% 459
4 May 1924	12.6% 62	0.8% 0	20.5% 100	13.4% 65	3.2% 16	5.7% 28	9.2% 45	19.5% 95	6.6% (Note: The National Socialist Freedom Party, an electoral alliance of the German Völkisch Freedom Party (DVFP) and the NSDAP, which had been banned as a result of the Hitler's 1923 Beer Hall Putsch.); 32	8.5% 29	5.7% 27	77.4% 472
7 December 1924	9.0% 45	0.3% 0	26.0% 131	13.6% 69	3.7% 19	6.3% 32	10.1% 51	20.5% 103	3.0% (Note: National Socialist Freedom Party.); 14	7.5% 29	6.7% 33	78.8% 493
20 May 1928	10.6% 54	0.1% 0	29.8% 153	12.1% 61	3.1% 17	4.8% 25	8.7% 45	14.2% 73	2.6% 12	14.0% 51	6.7% 33	75.6% 491
14 September 1930	13.1% 77	0.03% 0	24.5% 143	11.8% 68	3.0% 19	3.8% 20	4.5% 30	7.0% 41	18.3% 107	14.0% 72	6.8% 39	82.0% 577
31 July 1932	14.3% 89	—	21.6% 133	12.4% 75	3.2% 22	1.0% 4	1.2% 7	5.9% 37	37.3% 230	3.1% 11	5.6% 34	84.1% 608
6 November 1932	16.9% 100	—	20.4% 121	11.9% 70	3.1% 20	1.0% 2	1.9% 11	8.3% 51	33.1% 196	3.3% 13	6.0% 35	80.6% 584
5 March 1933	12.3% 81	—	18.3% 120	11.3% 73	2.7% 19	0.9% 5	1.1% 2	8.0% (Note: An electoral alliance of the DNVP, the Stahlhelm and the Landbund (Agricultural League).); 52	43.9% 288	1.5% 7	3.2% 21	88.7% 647

== End of the Republic ==
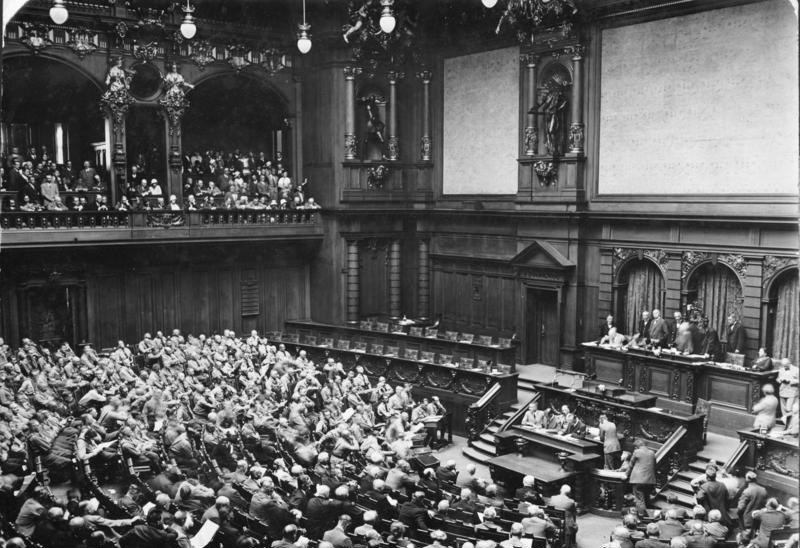
Opening ceremony of the Reichstag on 30 August 1932, with Nazi members in uniform (on the left side of the photograph)

The powers given to the Reich president in constitutional articles 48 and 25 (emergency decrees and dissolution of parliament) made possible the so-called presidential cabinets (Präsidialkabinette) from 1930 onward, when the Reich president and the Reich government largely did the legislative work instead of the Reichstag. The practice was reinforced by the electoral successes of the anti-republican Nazi Party and the Communist Party of Germany, which held more seats than all other parties combined after the Reichstag election of 31 July 1932, making it impossible for a majority coalition to be formed without at least one of these two parties. In 1933 the Nazis used the two constitutional articles, along with the ability to transfer the legislative function from the Reichstag to the government through an Enabling Act, to establish a dictatorship. Following the banning of the left-wing parties and the forced self-dissolution of the center and right-wing parties in the spring of 1933, the enactment of the Law Against the Formation of Parties (14 July 1933) converted the Reichstag into a one-party rubber stamp parliament dominated by the NSDAP. Its last session was held on 26 April 1942.
