= Leipzig (electoral district) =

Former constituency of the Reichstag (Weimar Republic)

29 Leipzig
- Former electoral constituency for the Reichstag
- Location within the Weimar Republic
- State: Saxony
- Electorate: 753,677 (1919); 989,952 (1933)
- Major settlements: Leipzig, Döbeln, Mittweida

Former constituency
- Created: 1919
- Abolished: 1938

Leipzig was one of the 35 electoral districts (German: Wahlkreise) used to elect members to the Reichstag during the Weimar Republic. It sent members to the Reichstag in nine democratic elections between 1919 and 1933. It existed nominally in the show elections to the Nazi Reichstag until 1938.

Its boundaries corresponded to the contemporary Kreishauptmannschaft of Leipzig within the Free State of Saxony. It was constituency 29 in the numbering scheme.

== Electoral system ==
The constituency was created for the 1919 election. Under the proportional representation electoral system of the Weimar Republic, voters cast a vote for party lists. Parties were awarded a seat for every 60,000 votes in a constituency. Excess votes were aggregated at two higher levels of seat distribution: an intermediate level combining multiple constituencies, where extra seats were awarded to parties' constituency lists, and a national level where seats were awarded to national lists of each party or alliance.

== Results (1919–1933) ==
=== Vote share ===
Party	1919	1920	1924 I	1924 II	1928	1930	1932 I	1932 II	1933
KPD		2.0	15.7	12.5	16.1	17.2	18.7	20.7	17.4
USPD	38.6	42.1	1.7	0.8	0.2				
SPD	20.7	9.1	30.2	35.7	37.0	34.9	33.1	32.2	30.1
DDP	28.7	8.4	7.2	7.8	6.0	3.2	1.7	1.3	2.1
Centre	0.5	0.4	0.5	0.7	0.6	0.6	1.1	1.1	1.0
DVP		20.9	16.5	18.6	13.0	9.4	2.2	3.3	2.0
WP				2.5	7.0	7.0	0.8	1.0	
SLV					5.2				
DNVP	11.6	16.9	18.0	18.4	6.6	3.7	4.5	7.2	6.5
Nazi			7.9	1.8	1.9	14.0	36.0	31.0	40.0
Other		0.3	2.3	1.2	6.4	10.0	1.9	2.2	0.9
Turnout	82.5	87.2	84.1	85.7	83.5	88.9	89.8	88.0	93.0
Source: Wahlen in Deutschland

=== Deputies ===
Election	Distribution	Seats
1919		8
1920		10
May 1924		11
Dec 1924		10
1928		11
1930		13
Jul 1932		11
Nov 1932		13
1933		13
Source: Wahlen in Deutschland
