= Kingdom of Saxony =

German monarchy in Central Europe (1806–1918)

Coordinates: 51°03′N 13°44′E

Kingdom of Saxony Königreich Sachsen (German)
- 1806–1918
- Top: Flag (1806–1815); Bottom: Flag (1815–1918) Coat of arms
- Motto: Providentiae Memor (Latin for 'Remember Providence')
- Anthem: Gott segne Sachsenland (1815) Sachsenlied ("Gott sei mit dir mein Sachsenland", 1842)
- The Kingdom of Saxony within the German Empire

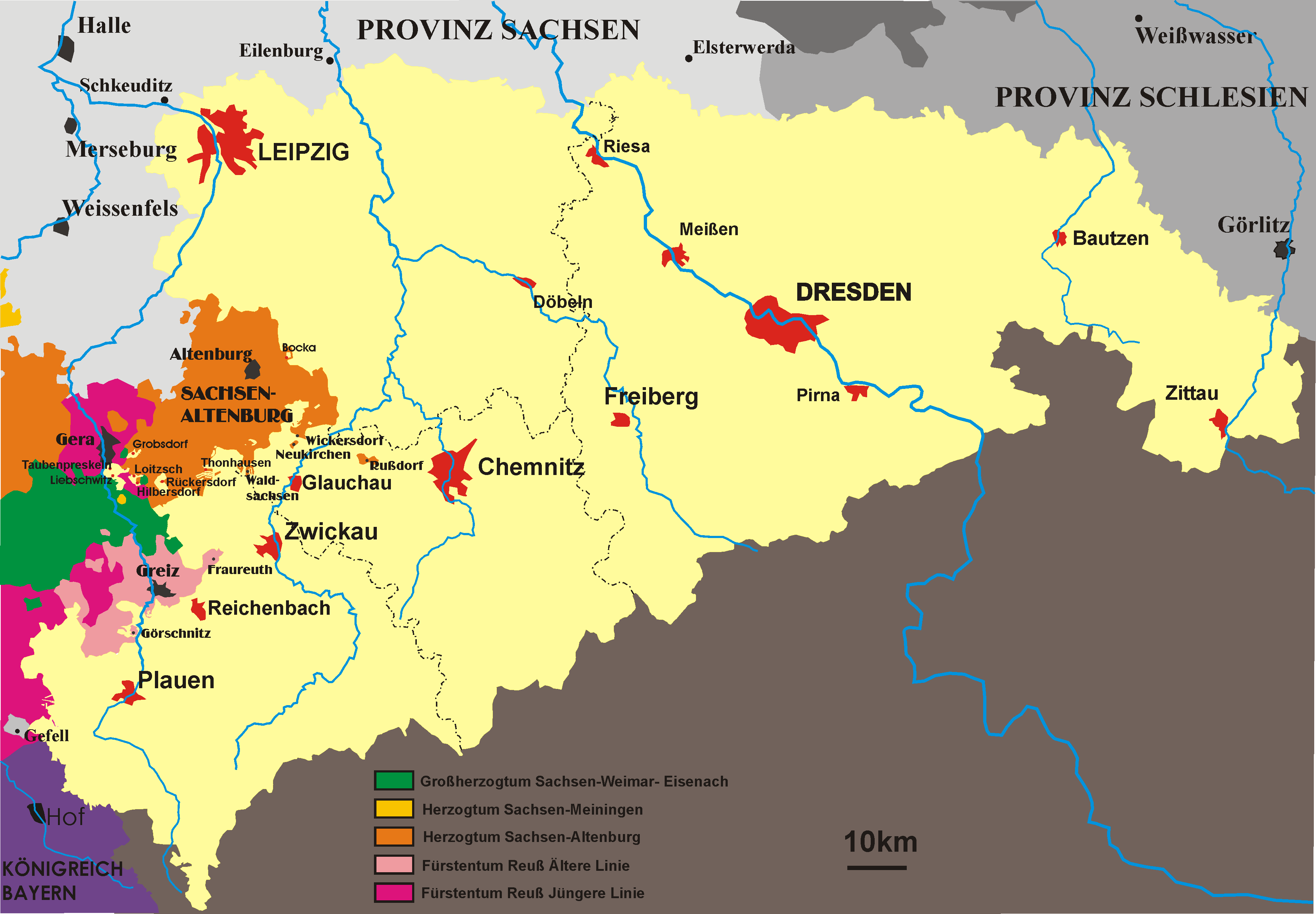
- Status: State of the Confederation of the Rhine (1806–1813); State of the German Confederation (1815–1866); State of the North German Confederation (1867–1871); Federal state of the German Empire (1871–1918)
- Capital: Dresden
- Common languages: Standard German (written; educated speech); Upper Saxon German (colloquial); Upper Sorbian (in Upper Lusatia)
- Religion: Lutheran (state religion), but monarchs were Catholic
- Demonym: Saxon
- Government: Absolute monarchy (until 1831); Constitutional monarchy (from 1831)
- King
  - 1806–1827: Frederick Augustus I (first)
  - 1904–1918: Frederick Augustus III (last)
- Minister-President
  - 1831–1843: Bernhard von Lindenau (first)
  - 1918: Rudolf Heinze (last)
- Legislature: Landtag (1831–1918)
  - Upper Chamber: "First Chamber"
  - Lower Chamber: "Second Chamber"
- Historical era: Napoleonic Wars / WWI
  - Treaty of Poznań: Electorate joined the Confederation of the Rhine: 11 December 1806
  - Electorate raised to Kingdom: 20 December 1806
  - Treaties of Tilsit: annexed Cottbus; union with Duchy of Warsaw: 9 July 1807
  - Occupied by Prussia: 1813
  - Final Act of the Congress of Vienna: 9 June 1815
  - Member of the North German Confederation: 1866
  - State of the German Empire: 1 January 1871
  - Frederick Augustus III abdicates: 13 November 1918
  - Free State established: 1 November 1920
- Currency: Saxon thaler (1806–1857); Saxon vereinsthaler (1857–1873); German gold mark (1873–1914); German Papiermark (1914–1918)
Preceded by	Succeeded by
Electorate of Saxony	Free State of Saxony (Weimar Republic); Province of Saxony
- Today part of: Germany; Poland

The Kingdom of Saxony (German: Königreich Sachsen) was a German monarchy in Central Europe between 1806 and 1918, the successor of the Electorate of Saxony. It joined the Confederation of the Rhine after the dissolution of the Holy Roman Empire, later joining the German Confederation after Napoleon was defeated in 1815. Beginning in 1871, it was part of the German Empire. It became a free state of the Weimar Republic in 1918 after the end of World War I and the abdication of King Frederick Augustus III. Its capital was Dresden, and its modern successor is the Free State of Saxony.

The third largest of the German kingdoms before integrating into the modern nation state of Germany, the kingdom of Saxony had a larger population in 1910 than Australia, the Netherlands, Belgium, Switzerland or Denmark.

== History ==
The Kingdom of Saxony in 1812 (green), within the Confederation of the Rhine (dark grey)

=== Napoleonic era and the German Confederation ===
Before 1806, Saxony was part of the Holy Roman Empire, a thousand-year-old entity that had become highly decentralised over the centuries. The rulers of the Electorate of Saxony of the House of Wettin had held the title of elector for several centuries. The Holy Roman Empire was dissolved in August 1806 following the defeat of Emperor Francis II by Napoleon at the Battle of Austerlitz, thereby rendering Saxony an independent state. Following the defeat of Saxony's ally Prussia at the Battle of Jena in October 1806, Saxony joined the Confederation of the Rhine, subordinating itself to the First French Empire, then the dominant power in Central Europe. On 20 December 1806 Frederick Augustus III, the last elector of Saxony, became King Frederick Augustus I.

In 1807 the Treaties of Tilsit ceded the Lordship of Cottbus, formerly a collection of Prussian enclaves within Saxon Lower Lusatia, to Saxony. The treaties also established the Polish Duchy of Warsaw, which was placed in a personal union with Saxony under Frederick Augustus I.

Saxony remained within the Confederation until its dissolution in 1813 with Napoleon's defeat at the Battle of Leipzig. Following the battle, in which Saxony – virtually alone of all the German states – had fought alongside the French, King Frederick Augustus I was deserted by his troops, taken prisoner by the Prussians, and considered to have forfeited his throne by the allies, who put Saxony under Prussian occupation and administration. This was probably more due to the Prussian desire to annex Saxony than to any crime on Frederick Augustus's part, and the fate of Saxony would prove to be one of the main issues at the Congress of Vienna.

The Kingdom of Saxony in 1815 (green), within the German Confederation (dark grey)

In the end, 60% of the kingdom, including the historically significant Wittenberg – home of the Protestant Reformation and historic core of the Electorate – as well as Lower Lusatia, most of Upper Lusatia, the Thuringian Circle and the Neustadt Circle, among other territories, was annexed by Prussia; most of the Neustadt Circle was re-ceded to Saxe-Weimar-Eisenach by Prussia. Within Prussia most of the ceded territory other than Lusatia would become part of the new Province of Saxony; the Upper Lusatian territory was attached to Silesia and the remainder, including Lower Lusatia, became part of Brandenburg. Frederick Augustus was restored to the throne in the remainder of his kingdom, which still included the major cities of Dresden and Leipzig. On the whole, the kingdom had lost about 60% of its land and 40% of its population. The kingdom also joined the German Confederation, the new organization of the German states to replace the fallen Holy Roman Empire.

=== Austro-Prussian War and the German Empire ===
During the 1866 Austro-Prussian War, Saxony sided with Austria, and the Royal Saxon Army was generally seen as the only ally to bring substantial aid to the Austrian cause, having abandoned the defence of Saxony itself to join up with the Austrian army in Bohemia. This effectiveness probably allowed Saxony to escape the fate of other north German states allied with Austria – notably the Kingdom of Hanover – which were annexed by Prussia after the war. The Austrians and French insisted as a point of honour that Saxony must be spared, and the Prussians acquiesced. Saxony nevertheless joined the Prussian-led North German Confederation the next year. With Prussia's victory over France in the Franco-Prussian War of 1871, the members of the confederation were organised by Otto von Bismarck into the German Empire, with Wilhelm I as its emperor. John, as Saxony's incumbent king, had to accept the Emperor as primus inter pares, although he, like the other German princes, retained some of the prerogatives of a sovereign ruler, including the ability to enter into diplomatic relations with other states.

Saxony ranked as the most industrialised state in Europe by 1871, second only to Belgium. Census figures from that year recorded 52% of the population employed in industry and crafts and 10% in trade and transportation, with agriculture accounting for just 16%. The fifth largest state of the German Empire by area and third by population, it was the most densely populated state in Europe.

=== End of the kingdom ===
Wilhelm I's grandson Kaiser Wilhelm II abdicated in 1918 as a result of a revolution set off in the days before Germany's defeat in World War I. King Frederick Augustus III of Saxony followed him into abdication when workers' and soldiers' councils were set up in the cities of Dresden, Chemnitz and Leipzig. Within the newly formed Weimar Republic, on 1 November 1920, the Kingdom of Saxony was reorganized into the Free State of Saxony.

== Governance ==
=== 1831 Constitution ===
The 1831 Constitution of Saxony established the state as a parliamentary monarchy.

==== King ====
The king was named as head of the nation. He was required to follow the provisions of the constitution, and could not become the ruler of any other state (save by blood inheritance) without the consent of the Diet, or parliament. The crown was hereditary in the male line of the royal family through agnatic primogeniture, though provisions existed allowing a female line to inherit in the absence of qualified male heirs. Added provisions concerned the formation of a regency if the king was too young or otherwise unable to rule, as well as provisions concerning the crown prince's education.

Any acts or decrees signed or issued by the king had to be countersigned by at least one of his ministers, who thus took responsibility for them. Without the ministerial countersignature, no act of the king was to be considered valid. The king was given the right to declare any accused person innocent, or alternately to mitigate or suspend their punishment or pardon them (but not to increase penalties); such decrees did not require ministerial co-signature. He was also given supreme power over religious matters in Saxony. He appointed the president of the upper house of the Diet, together with a proxy from among three candidates suggested by that house, and appointed the president and proxy of the lower house, as well. (See below.)

The king was given sole power to promulgate laws, and to carry them into effect, and only by his consent could any proposal for a law be advanced in the Diet. He equally had authority to issue emergency decrees and even to issue non-emergency laws that he found needful or "advantageous", though such instruments required the counter-signature of at least one of his ministers, and had to be presented to the next Diet for approval. He could not, however, change the constitution itself or the electoral laws in this manner. He was permitted to veto laws passed by the Diet (though he was required to give his reasons for so doing, in each instance), or to send them back with proposed amendments for reconsideration. He was permitted to issue extraordinary decrees to obtain money for state expenditures refused by the Diet, through the Supreme Court, though such decrees could only last for one year. He was permitted to dissolve the Diet, though new elections for the lower house had to be held within six months; he was also permitted to convoke extraordinary sessions of the legislature at his discretion.

From 1697 the Electors of Saxony became Catholic in order to accept the crowns of Poland-Lithuania, of which they were kings until 1763. The royal family remained Roman Catholic, ruling over a domain that was 95% Protestant.

==== Ministry ====
The ministry was defined in the constitution as consisting of six departments, all of which were made responsible to the Diet:

- The Chief Court of Justice;
- The Court of Finance;
- The Office For the Affairs of the Interior;
- The War Office;
- The Ecclesiastical Court;
- The Office of Foreign Affairs.

Members of the ministry had the right to appear in either chamber of the Diet at will, and there to participate in debate, but upon a division of the house they had to withdraw.

==== Bill of Rights ====
A Bill of Rights was included in the constitution. It incorporated:

- Protections for "liberty of person and right over his own property is without limit except that which law and justice dictates" (Section 27);
- The right of a citizen to choose any lawful profession and to emigrate so long as no military or civil obligations attached to them (Sections 28–29);
- The right to be paid for expropriated property and to challenge the amount of payment set by the state in court (Section 31);
- Liberty of conscience and religion (Section 32), though freedom of religion was limited to Christian churches recognized by the state (Section 56);
- Equality for members of state-recognized religious organizations (Section 33);
- Equality in eligibility for government employment (Section 34);
- A limited freedom of the press, subject to legal restrictions (Section 35);
- The right to appeal actions of government officials either to the courts or to the Diet itself (Section 36);
- The right to directly appeal grievances to the King himself (Section 36);
- Freedom from arbitrary arrest and punishment save through conviction in a court of law (Section 51);
- No person was to be confined for more than 24 hours without being informed of the reason for his arrest (Section 51);
- The right to be free of all taxes other than those prescribed by law or title (Section 37).

==== Legislature ====
The Diet, or legislature was divided into two houses, which were constitutionally equal in their rights and status, and neither house was to meet without the other.

The upper chamber consisted of the following:

- All princes of the blood who were of legal age (defined as 19, in the constitution);
- One deputy of the Bishopric of Misnia (Meißen);
- The proprietor of the Principality of Wildenfels;
- One deputy representing the five Schönburg family domains;
- One deputy from the University of Leipzig, chosen by the professors of that institution;
- The proprietor of the Barony of Königsbrück;
- The proprietor of the Barony of Riebersdorf;
- The minister (Court preacher) of the Lutheran court chapel;
- The dean of the Roman Catholic Collegiate Church of St. Peter in Budessen/Bautzen;
- The superintendent of the town of Leipzig;
- One deputy from the Lutheran Cathedral of Wurzen;
- One deputy representing four other Schönburg family estates;
- Twelve proprietors of manorial estates in the kingdom, possessed of a minimum income of at least $2000 per year from rentals, chosen for life from amongst themselves;
- Ten more persons of the proprietary class, possessed of a minimum income of at least $4000 per year from rentals, chosen by the king for life;
- The chief magistrate of Dresden and Leipzig;
- Six other town magistrates chosen by the king, with the provision that the monarch should try to see that all sections of the kingdom were represented.

Members of this house held their seats so long as they remained qualified to do so under the constitution, or in certain cases until they had reached the age of sixty or participated in three sessions of the Diet.

The lower house of the Diet consisted of:

- Twenty proprietors of manorial estates, possessed of rental income of at least $600 per year;
- Twenty-five deputies from towns;
- Twenty-five deputies chosen from among the peasants;
- Five representatives of trades and factories.

A proxy was to also be chosen for each representative, who would take the representative's place, should they be incapacitated, absent, resign or be removed. Each representative was elected for nine years; however, approximately one-third were required to resign their seats every three years (the exact figures were set in the constitution, and determined by lot at the commencement of the first session of the Diet), though all were eligible for immediate re-election. The lower house was to nominate four members, of whom the king was to choose one to be president of that house, and another to be his proxy.

Members of the Diet must be at least 30 years of age; electors must be 25 years of age, not have been convicted of any offense in a court of law, not have their personal estate financially encumbered in any way, and not be under guardianship.

The Diet was required to consider any business laid before it by the king, before proceeding to any other business. Members were to vote their consciences, and were not to accept instructions from their constituents. Members were granted full freedom of speech in the chambers, but were not permitted to insult each other, the king, any member of the royal family, or the parliament. Members who violated any of these rules could be disciplined by their respective house, up to and including permanent expulsion with ineligibility for re-election. The Diet could propose the formation of new laws or changes in existing ones, but no bill could be brought forward without the king's express consent. Conversely, no new law could be enacted, without the Diet's consent.

Bills could be passed by a simple one-third-plus-one vote in both houses of the Diet; a majority vote was not necessary in either house. Any bill rejected or amended must contain a statement of why it was rejected or amended. No new taxes could be imposed without the Diet's consent, though the king was permitted to bypass this in certain instances. The parliament could impeach members of the ministry by unanimous vote of both houses; ministers so impeached were to be tried by a special court; the decision of this court was final, and even the king's right of pardon did not extend to persons convicted by it.

In the wake of the tumultuous 1848 revolutions, Saxony's Landtag extended voting rights (though still maintaining property requirements) and abolished voting taxes. In 1871, Saxony was incorporated into the German Empire and more voting rights were gradually extended. By the early 1900s, Saxony's local politics had settled into a niche in which Social Democrats, Conservatives, and National Liberals were splitting the share of votes and Landtag seats three ways. (In 1909: Social Democrats won 27% of seats, Conservatives won 31% of seats, National Liberals won 31% of seats). Voter participation was high (82% in 1909).

==== Judiciary ====
The judiciary was made independent of the civil government. The High Court of Judiciature, created in Sections 142 to 150, was also given authority to rule upon "dubious" points in the constitution; its decision was decreed to be final, and was protected from royal interference.

==== Administrative reorganisation ====
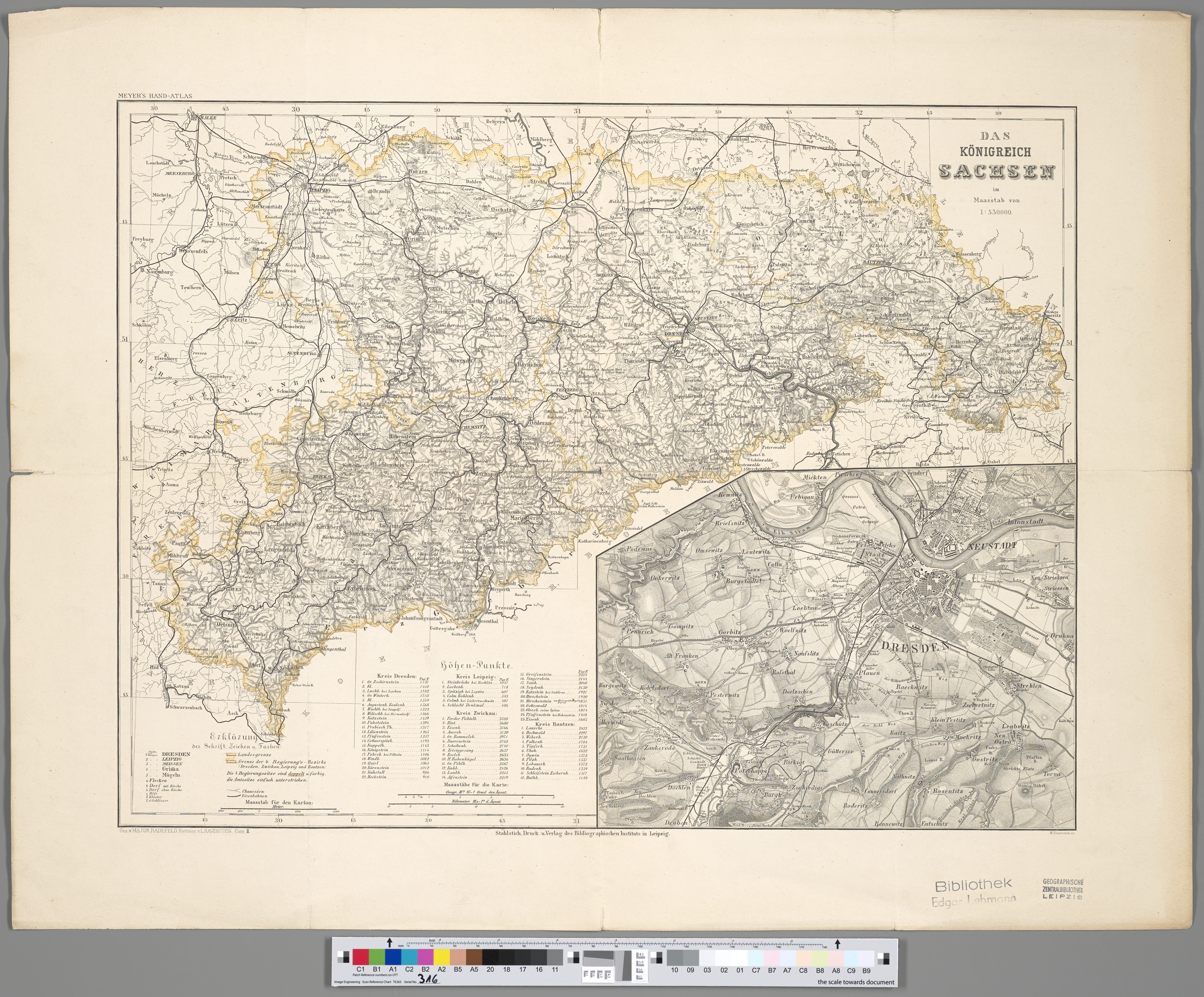
Map circa 1880 featuring the boundaries of the four original Kreisdirektionen

Following the adoption of the 1831 constitution, by the Order of April 6, 1835 district directorates (Kreisdirektionen) were established. These were subsequently known as Kreishauptmannschafts. Originally there were four:

- Kreishauptmannschaft Bautzen
- Kreishauptmannschaft Dresden
- Kreishauptmannschaft Leipzig
- Kreishauptmannschaft Zwickau

In 1900 a fifth was added:

- Kreishauptmannschaft Chemnitz

=== Reichstag deputies 1867 to 1918 ===
Following the North German Confederation Treaty, the Kingdom of Saxony entered the North German Confederation in 1866. As a consequence, the kingdom returned deputies to the Reichstag. After the founding of the German Empire on 18 January 1871, the deputies were returned to the Reichstag of the German Empire. Following this Saxony participated in Reichstag elections from February 1867. Zittau returned a series of Reichstag deputies until 1919 when the existing constituencies were scrapped.
