= Potsdam I (electoral district) =

Former constituency of the Reichstag (Weimar Republic)

4 Potsdam I
- Former electoral constituency for the Reichstag
- Location within the Weimar Republic
- State: Prussia
- Province: Brandenburg
- Electorate: 1,025,867 (1919); 1,487,061 (1933)
- Major settlements: Lichtenberg, Spandau, Pankow, Reinickendorf, Potsdam, Brandenburg an der Havel

Former constituency
- Created: 1919
- Abolished: 1938

Potsdam I was one of the 35 electoral districts (German: Wahlkreise) used to elect members to the Reichstag during the Weimar Republic. It sent members to the Reichstag in nine democratic elections between 1919 and 1933. It existed nominally in the show elections to the Nazi Reichstag until 1938.

It comprised the northern suburbs of Berlin and most of the Regierungsbezirk Potsdam, the western part of Brandenburg. It was constituency 4 in the numbering scheme.

== Electoral system ==
The constituency was created for the January 1919 election. Under the proportional representation electoral system of the Weimar Republic, voters cast a vote for party lists. Parties were awarded a seat for every 60,000 votes in a constituency. Excess votes were aggregated at two higher levels of seat distribution: an intermediate level combining multiple constituencies, where extra seats were awarded to parties' constituency lists, and a national level where seats were awarded to national lists of each party or alliance.

== Results (1919–1933) ==
=== Vote share ===
Party	1919	1920	1924 I	1924 II	1928	1930	1932 I	1932 II	1933
KPD		1.2	14.9	12.1	17.1	20.1	20.1	23.6	18.0
USPD	14.9	30.2	1.8	0.6	0.2	0.1			
SPD	41.9	20.6	20.7	30.3	34.6	28.7	26.7	23.5	20.7
DDP	20.8	7.5	5.1	6.3	5.2	3.5	1.1	0.9	0.9
Centre	2.3	1.8	2.2	2.5	2.1	2.3	3.0	2.7	2.8
DVP	7.6	17.2	7.8	7.8	6.6	3.4	0.8	1.0	0.8
WP			4.4	4.8	5.0	4.1	0.4	0.2	
DNVP	12.6	19.6	32.2	31.3	22.8	13.9	9.0	12.8	11.7
Nazi			5.8	2.8	1.7	18.8	38.1	34.1	44.4
Other		1.7	5.1	1.5	4.8	5.3	0.9	1.2	0.6
Turnout	84.9	82.6	78.9	79.8	78.5	83.3	85.0	82.5	89.2
Source: Wahlen in Deutschland

=== Deputies ===
Election	Distribution	Seats
1919		10
1920		12
May 1924		12
Dec 1924		13
1928		14
1930		18
Jul 1932		19
Nov 1932		18
1933		19
Source: Wahlen in Deutschland
