= Oppeln (electoral district) =

Former constituency of the Reichstag (Weimar Republic)

9 Oppeln
- Former electoral constituency for the Reichstag
- Location within the Weimar Republic
- State: Prussia
- Province: Upper Silesia
- Electorate: 1,147,745 (1919); 742,071 (1922); 922,312 (1933)
- Major settlements: Hindenburg O.S., Gleiwitz, Beuthen, Kattowitz

Former constituency
- Created: 1919
- Abolished: 1938

Oppeln was one of the 35 electoral districts (German: Wahlkreise) used to elect members to the Reichstag during the Weimar Republic. It sent members to the Reichstag in nine democratic elections between 1919 and 1933. It existed nominally in the show elections to the Nazi Reichstag until 1938.

Its boundaries corresponded to the contemporary province of Upper Silesia within the Free State of Prussia. It was constituency 9 in the numbering scheme.

== Electoral system ==
The constituency was created for the January 1919 election. Under the proportional representation electoral system of the Weimar Republic, voters cast a vote for party lists. Parties were awarded a seat for every 60,000 votes in a constituency. Excess votes were aggregated at two higher levels of seat distribution: an intermediate level combining multiple constituencies, where extra seats were awarded to parties' constituency lists, and a national level where seats were awarded to national lists of each party or alliance.

== Results (1919–1933) ==
=== Vote share ===
Party	1919	1920 (Note: Elections in Oppeln were delayed until November 1922 due to territorial plebiscites.)	1924 I	1924 II	1928	1930	1932 I	1932 II	1933
KPD		7.3	23.6	12.2	12.7	16.6	17.0	16.9	9.2
USPD	4.9		0.2						
SPD	32.7	14.8	4.8	6.8	12.6	9.3	8.7	9.1	6.9
DDP	6.9	2.3	2.0	2.2	1.6	1.0	0.2	0.2	0.3
Centre	48.4	40.1	36.0	41.0	40.0	35.2	34.6	35.8	32.3
DVP		7.1	3.3	2.8	2.7	1.4	0.3	0.4	0.2
DNVP	7.2	13.8	18.8	21.8	17.1	15.2	6.9	8.0	7.5
Nazi			0.3	1.5	1.0	9.5	29.2	26.8	43.2
Other		14.5	12.2	11.7	12.3	11.6	3.1	2.7	0.2
Turnout	58.7	69.4	71.5	69.9	70.2	77.1	78.6	75.0	85.8
Source: Wahlen in Deutschland

=== Deputies ===
Election	Distribution	Seats
1919		15
1920 (Note: Elections in Oppeln were delayed until November 1922 due to territorial plebiscites.)		5
May 1924		6
Dec 1924		6
1928		7
1930		10
Jul 1932		10
Nov 1932		9
1933		12
Source: Wahlen in Deutschland
