= Hanover (region) =

Coordinates: 52.3667°N 9.7333°E

Hanover Hannover
- Regierungsbezirk
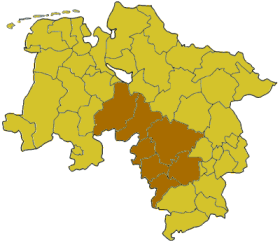
- Map of Lower Saxony highlighting Hanover
- Country: Germany
- State: Lower Saxony
- Disestablished: 2004-12-31
- Region seat: Hanover

Area
  - Total: 9,046.82 km^{2} (3,493.00 sq mi)

Population (30 Sep. 2004)
  - Total: 2,167,343
  - Density: 239.570/km^{2} (620.482/sq mi)

GDP
  - Total: €88.400 billion (2021)

Hanover (German: Hannover) was a Regierungsbezirk of the German state of Lower Saxony from 1946 until 2004. It was located in the centre and the south of the state, centered on the Lower Saxon capital of Hanover.

== History ==
There was a similar, equally named administrative unit within the then Prussian Province of Hanover from 1885 until the end of World War II; and before that, a 1823 established Landdrostei within the Kingdom of Hanover.

Kreise (districts) from 2001 to 2004

1. Diepholz
2. Hamelin-Pyrmont (Hameln-Pyrmont)
3. Hanover (Hannover)
4. Hildesheim
5. Holzminden
6. Nienburg
7. Schaumburg
