= Kreishauptmannschaft Leipzig =

District of the Kingdom of Saxony, 1835–1939

Kreishauptmannschaft Leipzig was a Kreishauptmannschaft or administrative district in the Kingdom of Saxony. Succeeding the Leipziger Kreis of the Electorate of Saxony, it was founded in 1835 and continued under the Free State of Saxony until being renamed the 'Regierungsbezirk Leipzig' in 1939, headed by Erich Teichmann (1882–?) as Regierungspräsident. The Kreishauptmannschaft system was abolished in 1943.

== History ==
In 1838 it was sub-divided into four amtshauptmannschaften:

- Amtshauptmannschaft I (Leipzig), consisting of the districts (Amtsbezirken) of Leipzig, Pegau and Borna
- Amtshauptmannschaft II (Rochlitz), consisting of the districts (Amtsbezirken) of Rochlitz and Colditz
- Amtshauptmannschaft III (Grimma), consisting of the districts (Amtsbezirken) of Grimma, Mutzschen, Wurzen and Oschatz
- Amtshauptmannschaft IV (Döbeln), consisting of the districts (Amtsbezirken) of Nossen, Mügeln and Leisnig

In 1874 the Kreisdirektionen and former Amtshauptmannschaften were dissolved. The Kreisdirektion Leipzig was replaced by the Kreishauptmannschaft Leipzig. It was subdivided into the followed Amtshauptmannschaften (known after 1939 as Landkreise):

- the city of Leipzig itself, which did not fall within a district
- Amtshauptmannschaft Borna
- Amtshauptmannschaft Döbeln
- Amtshauptmannschaft Grimma
- Amtshauptmannschaft Leipzig
- Amtshauptmannschaft Oschatz
- Amtshauptmannschaft Rochlitz

In 1924 Döbeln, Mittweida and Wurzen were also split off from their Amtshauptmannschaften as district-free cities.

== Kreishauptmann ==
- until 1875: Carl Ludwig Gottlob von Burgsdorff (1812–1875)
- January–October 1876: Léonce Robert von Könneritz (1835–1890)
- 1876–1887: Otto Georg Graf zu Münster (1825–1893)
- 1887–1906: Georg Otto von Ehrenstein (1835–1907)
- 1906–1910: Johann Georg Freiherr von Welck (1839–1912)
- 1910–1919: Curt Ludwig Franz von Burgsdorff (1849–1922)
- 1919–1924: Heinrich Lange (1861–1939)
- 1924–1925: Edwin Rudolf Lempe (ernannt, aber Amt nicht angetreten; * 1879)
- 1925–1933: Richard Marcus (1883–1933)
- March–September 1933: Curt Ludwig Ehrenreich von Burgsdorff (NSDAP) I. Amtszeit (1886–1962)
- 1933–1937: Kurt Walter Dönicke (NSDAP) (1899–1945)
- 1937–1938: Curt Ludwig Ehrenreich von Burgsdorff (NSDAP) II.Amtszeit (1886–1962)

== Population ==
Year	1837	1849	1871	1900	1939
Population	367.753	428.532	589.377	1.060.632	1.379.165
