= Saxon Peasants =

Saxon Peasants Sächsisches Landvolk
- Abbreviation: SLV
- Ideology: Conservatism

The Saxon Peasants (German: Sächsisches Landvolk) was an agricultural interest party with a conservative political orientation that existed in the Free State of Saxony during the Weimar Republic from 1928 to 1932. It was closely linked to the Saxon Rural League in terms of personnel. At times, the SLV worked closely with the Christian-National Farmers' and Rural People's Party (CNBL) and later with the German National People's Party (DNVP).

== History ==
The party first contested national elections in 1928, winning two seats in the federal elections. However, the party did not contest the next elections in 1930.
