= Kreishauptmannschaft Dresden =

Administrative division in the Kingdom of Saxony

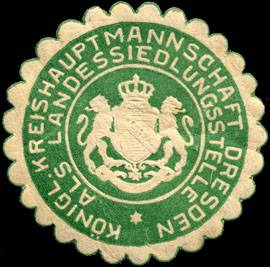
seal of the Kreishauptmannschaft Dresden

Kreishauptmannschaft Dresden was a Kreishauptmannschaft or administrative district in the Kingdom of Saxony. It was founded in 1835 and continued under the Free State of Saxony until it was merged with Kreishauptmannschaft Bautzen in 1934 Dresden.

Kreishauptmannschaft Dresden issued the Roman numeral II to road vehicles licensed there. In 1906 the Saxon authorities refused to add additional letters, in line with vehicle licensing reforms introduced in line with the rest of the German Empire.
