= Minden region =

Coordinates: 52.2880°N 8.9207°E

The Minden Region (German: Regierungsbezirk Minden) was a government region located in the north-easternmost part of the Prussian Province of Westphalia. It existed from the years 1816 to 1947. It had an area of 5,262 km² and 736,128 inhabitants (1910). One third were Catholics. The capital was Minden and the region was divided into eleven districts.

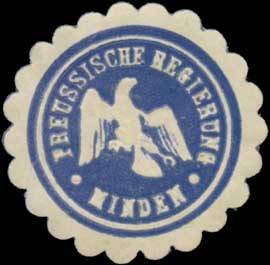
Sealing stamp of the Minden regional government

The Minden Region ceased to exist in 1947, when it merged with the Free State of Lippe to form the Detmold Region in the new federal state of North Rhine-Westphalia.
