= Kreishauptmannschaft =

Designation for an administrative territorial entity

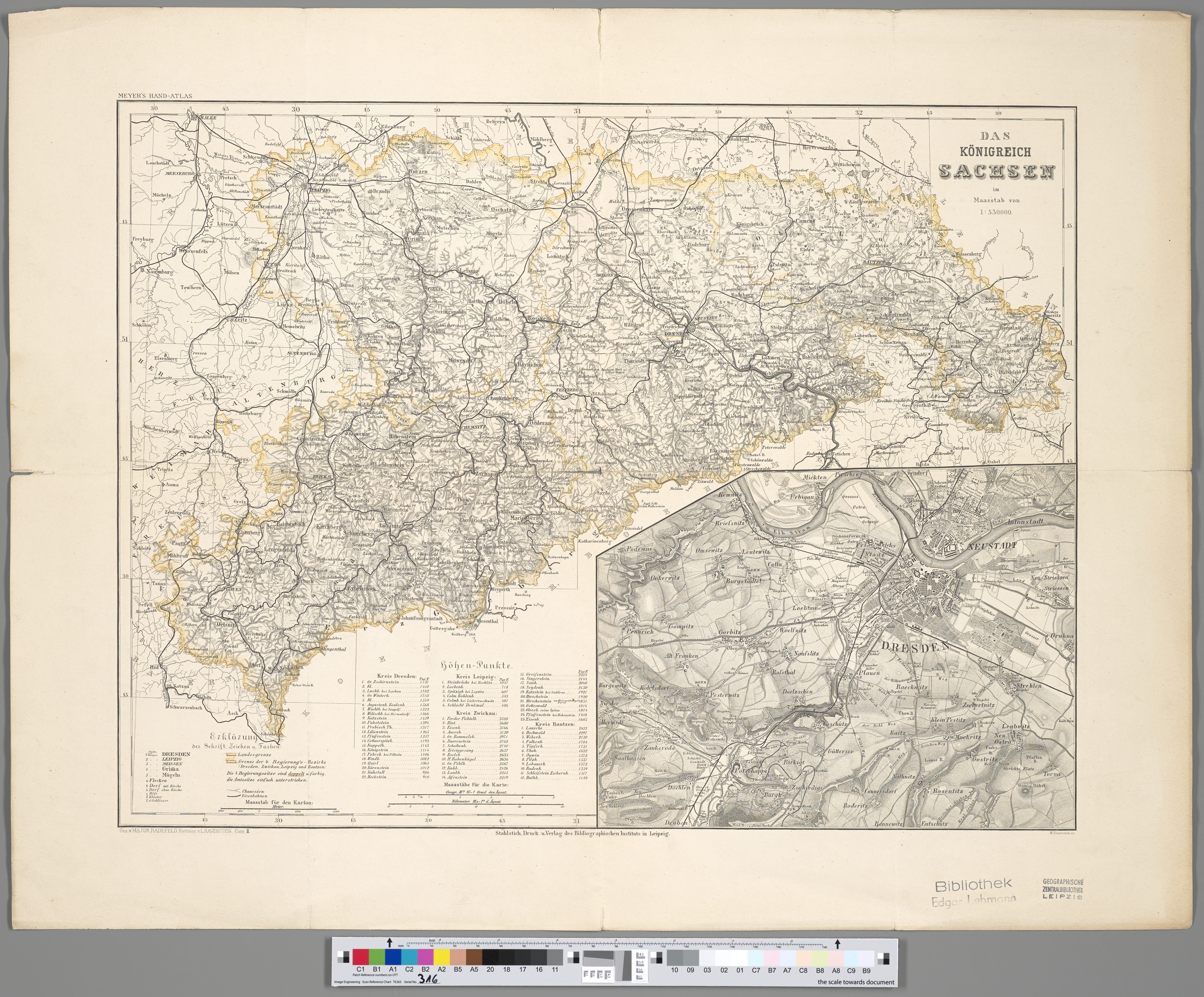
Historical map of Saxony featuring the Kreishauptmannschafts

Kreishauptmannschaft is a German historical term that may refer to a historical type of administrative division in Germany, especially in the Kingdom of Saxony.

Translated literally, it would mean something like District Captaincy. Regierungsbezirk is the word for such administrative division in modern Germany.

== Kreishauptmannschaft in the Kingdom of Saxony ==
Originally there were four Kreishauptmannschaften in the Kingdom of Saxony:

- Kreishauptmannschaft Bautzen
- Kreishauptmannschaft Dresden
- Kreishauptmannschaft Leipzig
- Kreishauptmannschaft Zwickau

In 1900, a fifth was added:

- Kreishauptmannschaft Chemnitz
