= Kreishauptmannschaft Bautzen =

Administrative district in the Kingdom of Saxony

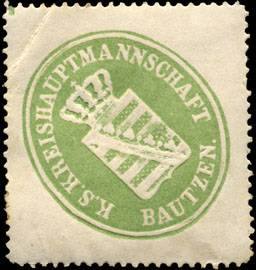
Sealright used by Kreishauptmannschaft Bautzen between 1850 and 1918

Kreishauptmannschaft Bautzen was a Kreishauptmannschaft or administrative district in the Kingdom of Saxony. It was founded in 1835 and continued under the Free State of Saxony until abolished in 1934.

Kreishauptmannschaft Bautzen issued the Roman numeral I to road vehicles licensed there. In 1906 the Saxon authorities refused to add additional letters, in line with vehicle licensing reforms introduced in line with the rest of the German Empire.
