= 1919 German federal election =

- 19 January 1919

All 423 seats in the Weimar National Assembly 212 seats needed for a majority
- Registered: 36,779,888 (▲154.7%)
- Turnout: 83.0% (▼1.9pp)
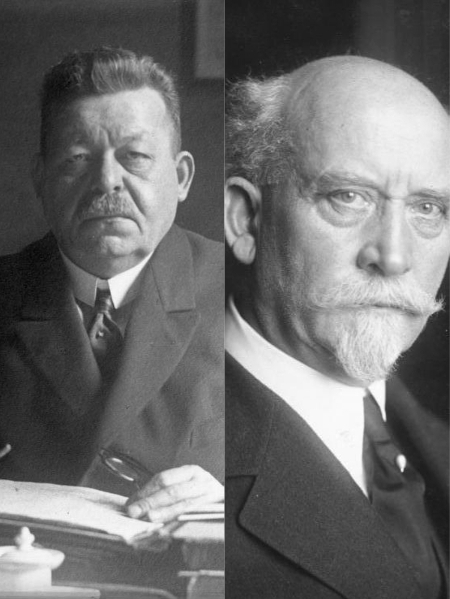

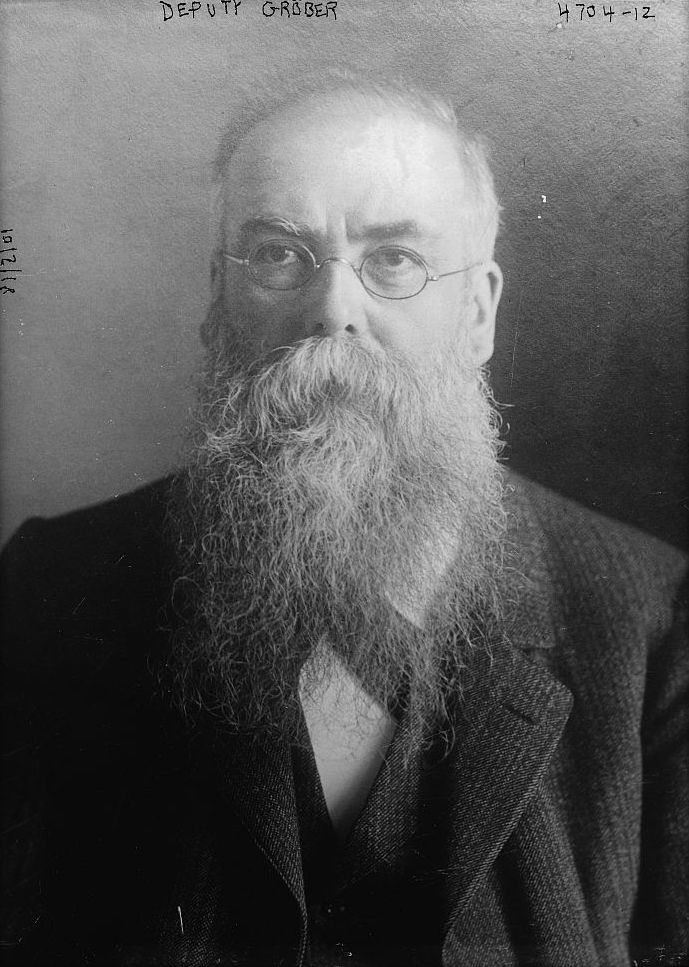

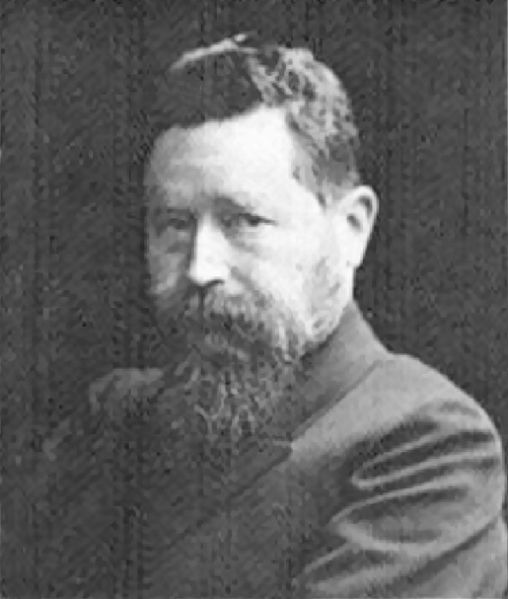

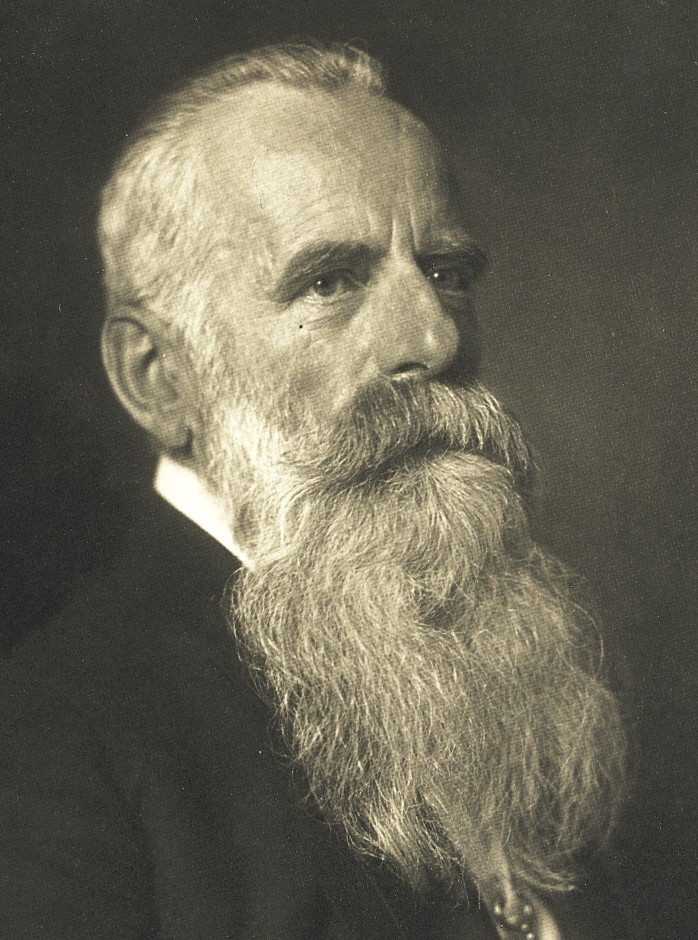

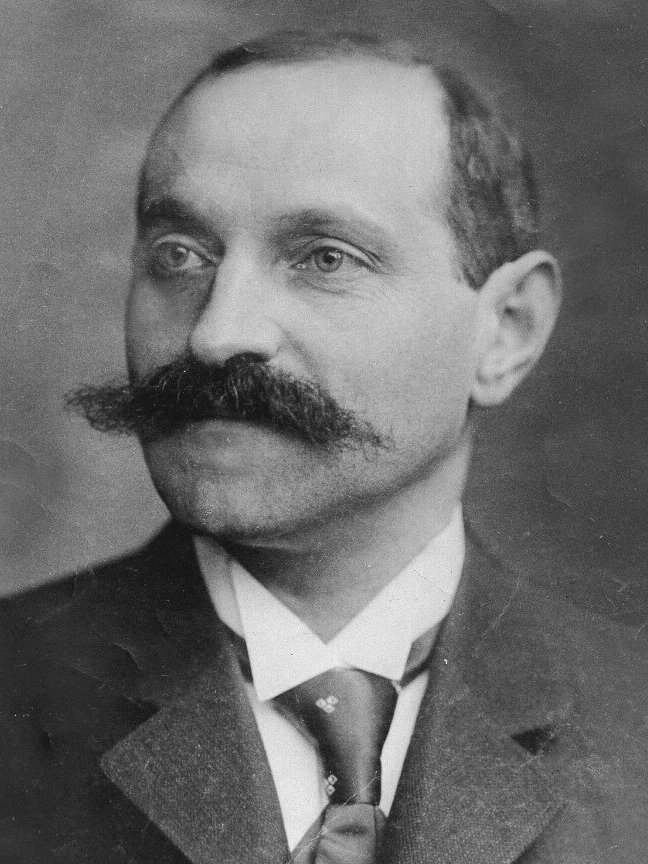

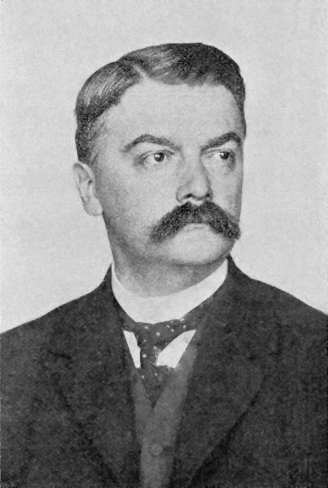
| | First party | Second party | Third party |
|---|---|---|---|
| Leader | Friedrich Ebert & Philipp Scheidemann | Adolf Gröber | Friedrich von Payer |
| Party | SPD | CVP | DDP |
| Seats won | 165 | 91 | 75 |
| Popular vote | 11,516,852 | 5,980,259 | 5,643,506 |
| Percentage | 37.9% | 19.7% | 18.6% |
| | Fourth party | Fifth party | Sixth party |
| Leader | Arthur von Posadowsky-Wehner | Hugo Haase | Rudolf Heinze |
| Party | DNVP | USPD | DVP |
| Seats won | 44 | 22 | 19 |
| Popular vote | 3,121,541 | 2,319,235 | 1,345,712 |
| Percentage | 10.3% | 7.6% | 4.4% |
Government before election
Council of the People's Deputies
SPD–USPD
Government after election
Scheidemann cabinet
SPD–DDP–Z

Federal elections were held in Germany on 19 January 1919 to elect a national constituent assembly that would write a new constitution for Germany following the collapse of the German Empire at the end of World War I. The election, which took place amid the sometimes violent political upheaval of the German revolution, used a form of proportional representation, lowered the voting age to 20 and allowed women to vote for the first time.

With the exception of the Social Democratic Party (SPD) and the Centre Party (which ran under the name 'Christian People's Party'), the major parties which took part in the election were newly formed from elements of parties that had been active during the German Empire. The three-week-old Communist Party of Germany (KPD) chose not to participate.

The Weimar National Assembly elected on 19 January was dominated by the moderate wing of the SPD, which formed a coalition with the largely middle-class Centre and German Democratic (DDP) parties. The Assembly drafted and adopted the Weimar Constitution, opening the way for the first election to the new republican Reichstag on 6 June 1920.

== Background ==
In the days leading up to Germany's surrender in World War I, the revolution of 1918–1919 broke out and led to the collapse of the German Empire. The Council of the People's Deputies – the revolutionary interim government made up of three members from the Majority Social Democratic Party (SPD) and three from the more radical Independent Social Democrats (USPD) – wanted a popularly elected national constituent assembly to make the decisions on Germany's future form of government. The middle-class parties generally agreed, but the left wing of the USPD and the communist Spartacus League called for a soviet system based on the Russian model.

At the Reich Congress of Workers' and Soldiers' Councils held in mid-December 1918, the motion to establish a pure council republic was voted down 344 to 98. The Congress by an eight-to-one margin then passed a resolution to hold the election for a constituent assembly on 19 January 1919.

In the broader context of the ongoing revolution, the situation remained volatile. The government's bloody suppression of the revolt of the socialist revolutionary Volksmarinedivision in Berlin led the USPD to withdraw from the Council of the People's Deputies at the end of December. The Communist Party of Germany (KPD) was founded on 1 January 1919, and the following week, government and Freikorps troops violently put down the Spartacist uprising by workers who were in favour of a council republic. In its aftermath, Rosa Luxemburg and Karl Liebknecht, the leading figures of the KPD, were murdered by Freikorps officers on 15 January.

It was against this backdrop of political upheaval that the election to the National Assembly took place.

== Electoral system ==
The Electoral Law of 30 November 1918, which was developed by the Council of the People's Deputies, decreed that universal, equal, secret and direct suffrage with proportional representation was to be used throughout Germany. The voting age was lowered from 25 to 20, and both women and soldiers were allowed to vote for the first time. The territory of the Reich was divided into 38 large districts, each with a varying number of individual constituencies. There was one representative for approximately every 150,000 inhabitants.

Since there were still a great many soldiers in the east, they were able to send two deputies to the National Assembly. Alsace–Lorraine, which was one of the 38 constituencies in the electoral law, had been occupied by France after the war, and as a result no election took place there. The law also made provisions for citizens of the Republic of German-Austria, which wished to join Germany, to vote for the National Assembly, but because of opposition from the Allied powers to a merger of the two countries, Austrians did not vote in the German election.

== Political parties ==
The SPD and USPD stood for the election in their existing forms. Even though Rosa Luxemburg and Karl Liebknecht of the Communist Party (KPD) had spoken in favour of it participating in the election, the majority of delegates at its founding assembly voted to boycott.

The Catholic Centre Party had both a strong conservative wing that rejected the revolution and a left wing, represented chiefly by Matthias Erzberger, which was in favour of a republic. There was also a debate within the party as to whether it should remain a Catholic party or become a Christian, interdenominational party. In the end, the decision was made to remain a Catholic party, although its official name for the 1919 election was changed to the Christian People's Party (CVP). In social terms, the party represented broad sections of Catholic Germany, ranging from workers and the middle class to the nobility, with the clergy playing an important role. A major issue for the party in 1919 was the perceived threat of a new Kulturkampf ('cultural struggle') similar to the one waged by Otto von Bismarck during the imperial era. The anti-church policies of Prussian Minister of Culture Adolph Hoffmann in particular united the Catholic vote against the Social Democrats.

The Bavarian People's Party (BVP) broke away from the Centre Party on 12 November 1918. The split was driven by anti-Prussian sentiment in Bavaria, fears of excessive party centralism and the concern that the more left-wing elements of the party would prevail. The BVP went on to pursue a considerably more conservative course than the Centre.

The German Democratic Party (DDP) was formed in November 1918. It welcomed the end of the Empire, supported a democratic state and strove for social and political reforms. Its supporters included liberal-minded workers, members of the middle class and parts of the university-educated bourgeoisie (Bildungsbürgertum). Its supporters came mainly from the imperial era left-liberal Progressive People's Party and to a lesser extent the National Liberal Party. The founders of the DDP had hoped that it would become an inclusive liberal party by incorporating the majority of the National Liberals, but they were unable to achieve their goal.

The legacy of the National Liberals was taken up by the German People's Party (DVP), which was formed in December 1918. The party was to the right of the DDP and emphasised its nationalist credentials. A considerable number of its members and supporters regretted the fall of the Empire. The party was supported mainly by self-employed people in trade and industry and by industrialists. It strongly opposed any form of socialism and portrayed itself as a defender of private property. The party benefited from financial support from heavy industry.

The German National People's Party (DNVP), founded at the end of November, continued in the tradition of the radical right-wing Fatherland Party and the Conservative and Free Conservative parties of the Empire. It included Pan-Germans, Christian Socialists and antisemites in its ranks, and found adherents among the middle class, civil servants and educated citizens (Bildungsbürgertum), as well as workers and salaried employees with strong nationalist sentiments. The DNVP had a clear regional focus in the Protestant Prussian areas east of the Elbe. The party opposed the revolution and sought a restoration of the monarchy, although it publicly declared itself in favour of a parliamentary government.

== Results ==
=== Trends ===
Of the 36,766,500 people eligible to vote, 83% went to the polls, compared with the 85% turnout in the previous Reichstag election held in 1912 under the German Empire. The new electoral law had led to the number of votes cast more than doubling from the roughly 12.5 million of 1912.

The SPD's 37.9% share of the vote made it by far the strongest party. With the USPD's 7.6%, the left-wing camp was stronger than in 1912 when it had received 34.8%. The two parties together nevertheless did not have an absolute majority.

The DDP achieved a major success with 18.5% of the vote. Compared to the 1912 results of its main predecessor, the Progressive People's Party, it was an increase of 6.2%. The Centre Party (which ran as the Christian People's Party) and the Bavarian People's Party, received 19.7% of the vote, an increase of 3.3% over the Centre Party's results in 1912. The right-wing German National People's Party (DNVP) received 10.3%, a significantly worse result than its predecessor parties, which together had won 15.1% of the vote in 1912. The crisis of the right-wing liberals was particularly evident. While the National Liberals had received 13.6% of the vote in 1912, the German People's Party (DVP) only managed 4.4% in 1919.

| Party | Votes | % | Seats |
|---|---|---|---|
| Social Democratic Party | 11,509,048 | 37.86 | 163 |
| Christian People's Party (Note: The Christian People's Party was the name used by the Centre Party in this election only. Its total includes 270,771 votes and four seats from a common Centre Party–German-Hanoverian Party party list in constituency 16 (Hannover/Hildesheim/Lüneburg/Braunschweig).) | 5,980,216 | 19.67 | 91 |
| German Democratic Party (Note: The German Democratic Party total includes 142,103 votes and two seats from a common German Democratic Party–German People's Party list in constituency 21 (Coblenz/Trier)) | 5,641,825 | 18.56 | 75 |
| German National People's Party (Note: The German National People's Party total includes 503,755 votes and seven seats from joint German National People's Party–German People's Party lists in constituencies 18 (Arnsberg), 22 (Düsseldorf West), and 36 (Thuringia).) | 3,121,479 | 10.27 | 44 |
| Independent Social Democratic Party | 2,317,290 | 7.62 | 22 |
| German People's Party | 1,345,638 | 4.43 | 19 |
| Bavarian Peasants' League | 275,125 | 0.91 | 4 |
| German-Hanoverian Party | 77,226 | 0.25 | 1 |
| Schleswig-Holstein Farmers and Farmworkers Democracy | 57,913 | 0.19 | 1 |
| Brunswick State Electoral Association | 56,858 | 0.19 | 1 |
| Mecklenburg Village League | 10,891 | 0.04 | 0 |
| German Peace Party | 3,503 | 0.01 | 0 |
| German Officials', Employees' and Middle Class Party | 1,438 | 0.00 | 0 |
| Christian Social Party | 664 | 0.00 | 0 |
| Middle Class Party | 640 | 0.00 | 0 |
| German Social Aristocracy | 279 | 0.00 | 0 |
| Democratic Middle Class Party | 208 | 0.00 | 0 |
| Social Reform Party | 45 | 0.00 | 0 |
| Total | 30,400,286 | 100.00 | 421 |
| Valid votes | 30,400,286 | 99.59 | |
| Invalid/blank votes | 124,562 | 0.41 | |
| Total votes | 30,524,848 | 100.00 | |
| Registered voters/turnout | 36,766,500 | 83.02 | |
Source: Gonschior.de

Representatives of standing troops in the East

| Party | Votes | % | Seats |
|---|---|---|---|
| Social Democratic Party | 7,804 | 60.04 | 2 |
| Independent Social Democratic Party | 1,945 | 14.96 | 0 |
| German Democratic Party | 1,681 | 12.93 | 0 |
| Non-partisan lists | 1,389 | 10.69 | 0 |
| German People's Party | 74 | 0.57 | 0 |
| German National People's Party | 62 | 0.48 | 0 |
| Christian People's Party | 43 | 0.33 | 0 |
| Total | 12,998 | 100.00 | 2 |
| Valid votes | 12,998 | 97.09 | |
| Invalid/blank votes | 390 | 2.91 | |
| Total votes | 13,388 | 100.00 | |
Source: Nohlen & Stöver, Gonschior.de

=== Analysis ===
The new electoral law meant that a large proportion of the electorate was first-time voters, since women and 20- to 24-year-olds were allowed to vote for the first time. The parties that had campaigned for women's suffrage did not particularly benefit from their votes. A considerable number of women voted for Christian or conservative parties. The SPD, which had long promoted women's suffrage, received significantly more votes from men than from women, as is shown in the electoral districts in which men and women voted separately. In Cologne, for example, 46% of men voted for the SPD but only 32% of women. In Catholic regions, women voted for the Christian People's Party (Centre Party) in above-average numbers. In predominantly Protestant areas, the DDP and DNVP both benefitted from women's suffrage.

The SPD had its strongest growth in the rural areas east of the Elbe, where the party attracted many agricultural workers. The USPD had a few strongholds, mostly in northern and central Germany. In Leipzig and Merseburg, the party was stronger than the SPD. The Catholic parties owed their gains in large part to Adolph Hoffmann's anti-church campaign. It led Catholic voters, and especially Catholic women, to support the Centre and the BVP. The DNVP also benefited from Hoffmann's policy, since it caused many Protestant believers to remain in the conservative camp. The poor performance of the DVP had several causes. The party's late founding meant that it lacked a functioning organisation, and many bourgeois voters opted for the DDP for tactical reasons. In bourgeois circles, it was assumed that the SPD would form a coalition with the DDP after the election. Many voters decided in favour of the DDP not out of any fundamental agreement with left-wing liberalism but in order to strengthen the middle class's voice in the future government. During the election campaign, the DDP had set itself apart from the SPD by promising to be the guardian of private property, a tactic which proved successful with the middle class.

== Aftermath ==
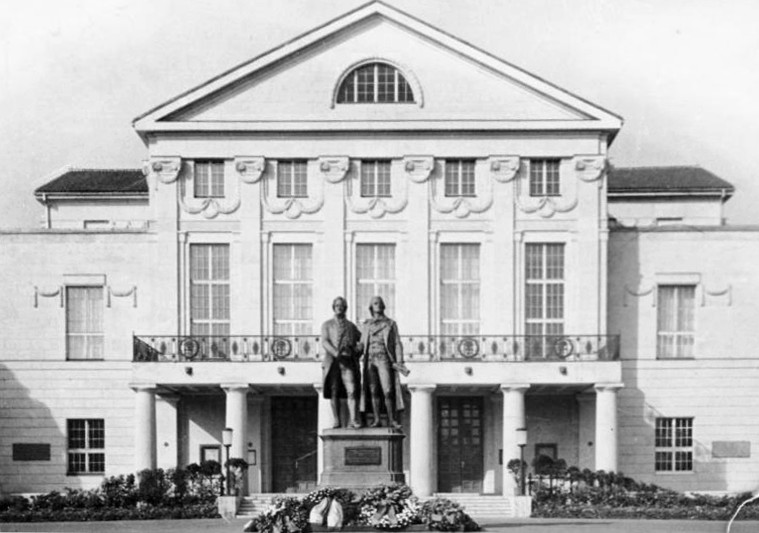
The National Theatre in Weimar, the meeting place of the National Assembly elected on 19 January 1919

The National Assembly convened on 6 February 1919 in the politically calm environment of Weimar. The election results essentially allowed no real options other than a coalition of SPD, Centre and DDP. An alliance between the SPD and USPD was only theoretically conceivable in view of the tensions between the sister parties. A small coalition between the SPD and DDP would also have been possible, but fear of the SPD dominating the DDP made the leaders of the DDP reject it. In the end, a government consisting of representatives of the SPD, the DDP and the Centre Party was formed (the so-called Weimar Coalition). On 10 February, it passed the Reich law on provisional power, which authorized it to serve as Germany's interim parliament. The following day, Friedrich Ebert of the SPD was elected provisional president of Germany by a large majority, and Philipp Scheidemann (also SPD) was commissioned to form a government. The Weimar Constitution was signed on 11 August 1919 and became effective on the 14th. A federal election was held on 6 June 1920 for the new republican Reichstag of what has come to be called the Weimar Republic.
