= List of Reichstag deputies in the Third Reich (2nd electoral term) =

This is a list of Reichstag deputies in the Third Reich (2nd electoral term). The Reichstag of Nazi Germany existed from 1933 to 1945. Its 2nd electoral term began with the parliamentary election of 12 November 1933 and lasted until the members were replaced in the election of 29 March 1936.

== Election ==
The 12 November 1933 parliamentary election was the first to be held following the 23 March 1933 passage of the Enabling Act, which effectively vested all legislative power in the hands of Chancellor Adolf Hitler and his cabinet. It was also the first election since the Law Against the Formation of Parties of 14 July 1933 established the Nazi Party (NSDAP) as the only legal political party.

The election took the form of a single-question, asking voters whether they approved of the list of candidates presented for the new Reichstag. According to the official election results, over 43 million votes were cast (95.3% turnout), 92.1% of them for the electoral lists of the NSDAP.

== Sessions ==
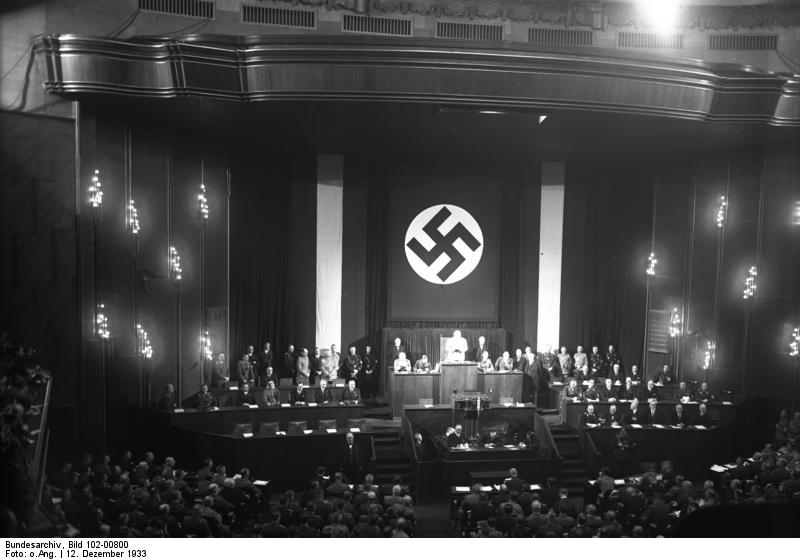
Hermann Göring, the president of the Reichstag, presiding over the opening session of the 2nd electoral term on 12 December 1933

The Reichstag members of the 2nd electoral term met for six sessions, the first being on 12 December 1933 and the last being on 7 March 1936. All the sessions were held at the Kroll Opera House in Berlin except for the fifth session, which was held at the Industrie- und Kulturverein Nürnberg (Industrial and Cultural Association of Nuremberg) during the 1935 Nuremberg rally.

The Reichstag passed only four laws during its term. The first was the Law on the Reconstruction of the Reich (30 January 1934), which abolished all state parliaments, transferred the states' sovereign rights to the Reich and effectively replaced the German federal state with a unitary state. Next was a set of three measures that collectively came to be known as the Nuremberg Laws (15 September 1935): the first redefined German citizenship by excluding Jews and other minorities, the second outlawed marriage or extramarital relations between Germans and Jews and the third established the swastika flag as the official flag of Nazi Germany.

Reichstag Sessions – 2nd Electoral Term
Session	Date	Notable Actions
1	12 December 1933	Hermann Göring is elected Reichstag president.
2	30 January 1934	The Reichstag passes the Law on the Reconstruction of the Reich, effectively replacing German federalism with a unitary state.
3	13 July 1934	Hitler announces and justifies his actions in the Röhm purge
4	21 May 1935	Hitler proclaims a new conscription law. New deputies from the recently-returned Saar are seated.
5	15 September 1935	The Reichstag passes the Nuremberg Laws.
6	7 March 1936	Hitler announces the remilitarization of the Rhineland and repudiates the Locarno Pact. A new Reichstag election is set for 29 March.

== Presidium ==
The Reichstag Presidium, consisting of a president and three vice-presidents, was elected en bloc at the first session on 12 December 1933.

Presidium of the Reichstag
Title	Incumbent
President	Hermann Göring
First Vice-president	Hanns Kerrl
Second Vice-president	Hermann Esser
Third Vice-president	Emil Georg von Stauss (Note: A "guest" of the Nazi Party faction.)

== Members ==
As a result of the July 1933 Law Against the Formation of Parties, in all subsequent Reichstag terms the only parliamentary faction allowed was that of the NSDAP. Members of the Reichstag who did not formally belong to the Nazi Party were listed as "guests" of the Nazi Party faction. There were only 22 such members in the Reichstag seated in the 2nd electoral term. All other deputies were members of the Nazi Party.

A total of 661 Reichstag deputies were elected on 12 November 1933. Sixteen deputies were elected from the national electoral list and the remainder from the 35 individual electoral constituencies. On 1 March 1935, as a result of the return of the Saar to Germany, an additional eight deputies were added to the Reichstag to represent the newly acquired territory. The single event affecting the largest change to the Reichstag membership was the Röhm purge (also called the Night of the Long Knives) of 30 June to 2 July 1934, in which thirteen members were murdered. A listing of all Reichstag members follows. Changes in membership due to deaths, resignations or expulsions occurring up until 29 March 1936, and the resulting replacements, are annotated in the "Notes" column.

=== Reichswahlvorschlag (Reich Electoral List) ===
The Reichswahlvorschlag was allocated 16 seats.

Name	Image	Birth	Death	Notes
Paul Bang		1879	1945	
Heinrich Claß		1868	1943	
Werner Daitz		1884	1945	
Friedrich Everling		1891	1958	
Oskar Farny		1891	1983	
Wolf-Heinrich Graf von Helldorff		1896	1944	
Rudolf Hess		1894	1987	
Alfred Hugenberg		1865	1951	
Franz von Papen		1879	1969	
Jakob Pirro		1899	1962	
Ernst Röhm		1887	1934	Murdered in the Röhm purge, 1 July 1934
Gerhard Rühle		1905	1949	
Rudolf Schaper		1881	1945	
August Schirmer		1905	1948	Replaced Ernst Röhm, 12 July 1934
Hermann Schmitz		1881	1960	
Franz Seldte		1882	1947	
Karl von Wedel-Parlow		1873	1936	

=== Constituency 1 (East Prussia) ===
East Prussia was allocated 22 seats.

Name	Image	Birth	Death	Notes
Erich Behrendt		1904	1941	
Ernst Duschön		1904	1981	
Gottfried Feder		1883	1941	
Erich Fuchs		1894	1945	Replaced Waldemar Weißel, 26 February 1935
Ferdinand Grossherr		1898	1945	
Erich Koch		1896	1986	
Adolf Kob		1885	1945	
Karl-Siegmund Litzmann		1893	1945	
Werner Lorenz		1891	1974	
Waldemar Magunia		1902	1974	
Erwin Nötzelmann		1907	1981	
Ewald Oppermann		1896	1965	
Egbert Otto		1905	1968	
Hermann Paltinat		1905	1974	
Ernst Penner		1883	1940	Replaced Max Stülpner, 26 February 1935
Claus von Platen		1891	1964	
Eugen Plorin		1901	1943	
Alfred Preuss		1887	1947	
Hans-Adolf Prützmann		1901	1945	
Max Stülpner		1882	1959	Resigned, 26 February 1935
Heinrich von Sybel		1885	1969	
Georg Usadel		1900	1941	
Nikolaus Wehner		1901	1942	
Waldemar Weißel		1897	1964	Resigned, 26 February 1935

=== Constituency 2 (Berlin) ===
Berlin was allocated 18 seats.

Name	Image	Birth	Death	Notes
Joachim von Blücher		1888	1980	Replaced Elhard von Morozowicz, April 1934
Karl Bombach		1891	1945	Replaced Karl Ernst, 4 September 1934
Otto Born		1892	1945	Replaced Achim Gercke, 23 April 1935
Otto Braß		1887	1945	
Johannes Engel		1894	1973	
Karl Ernst		1904	1934	Murdered in the Rohm purge, 30 June 1934
Hans Fabricius		1891	1945	
Hans von Freyberg		1881	1945	
Achim Gercke		1902	1997	Expelled, 9 April 1935
Joseph Goebbels		1897	1945	
Artur Görlitzer		1893	1945	
Paul Harpe		1902	1983	
Max Henze		1899	1951	
Erich Hilgenfeldt		1897	1945	
Elhard von Morozowicz		1893	1934	Died, 31 January 1934
Wilhelm Petzold		1898	1945	
Ernst Graf zu Reventlow		1869	1943	
Heinrich Schnee		1871	1949	
Walter Schuhmann		1898	1956	
Alfred Spangenberg		1897	1947	
Rudolf Weiß		1899	1945	

=== Constituency 3 (Potsdam II) ===
Potsdam II was allocated 19 seats.

Name	Image	Birth	Death	Notes
Kurt Daluege		1897	1946	
Richard Fiedler		1908	1974	
Waldemar Geyer		1882	1947	
Karl Hanke		1903	1945	
Berthold Hell		1901	1945	
Hans Hinkel		1901	1960	
Heinrich Hunke		1902	2000	
Károly Kampmann		1902	1945	
Moritz Kraut		1905	1941	Replaced Walther Schulze-Wechsungen, 11 February 1936
Richard Kunze		1872	1945	
Gerhard Schach		1906	1945	
Rudolf Schultz		1905	1941	Replaced Hermann Voß, 8 June 1934
Walther Schulze-Wechsungen		1902	1944	Expelled, 28 January 1936
Werner Schwarz		1902	1942	
Paul Skoda		1901	1945	
Karl Spiewok		1892	1951	
Franz von Stephani		1876	1939	
Hermann Voß		1892	1934	Died, 3 April 1934
Werner Wächter		1902	1946	
Kurt Wege		1891	1947	
Martin Wülfing		1899	1986	

=== Constituency 4 (Potsdam I) ===
Potsdam I was allocated 22 seats.

Name	Image	Birth	Death	Notes
Wilhelm Decker		1899	1945	
Hermann Göring		1893	1946	
Anton Hauk		1886	1971	
Richard Kackstein		1903	1966	
Otto Kannengiesser		1893	1958	
Walter Kühle		1888	1972	
Karl Litzmann		1850	1936	
Martin Löpelmann		1891	1981	
Willi Luckner		1896	1975	Replaced Siegfried Seidel-Dittmarsch, 3 April 1934
Siegfried Polack		1899	1944	
August Wilhelm Prinz von Preussen		1887	1949	
Joachim von Ribbentrop		1893	1946	
Willi Ruckdeschel		1900	1974	
Karl Schröder		1897	unknown	
Karl Schultz		1902	1977	
Siegfried Seidel-Dittmarsch		1887	1934	Died, 20 February 1934
Helmut Stellrecht		1898	1987	
Martin Stumpf		1886	1974	
Fritz Tittmann		1898	1945	
Alexander Freiherr von Wangenheim		1872	1959	
Wilhelm Weiss		1892	1950	
Martin Wendt		1886	1947	
Heinz Wohlleben		1905	1972	

=== Constituency 5 (Frankfurt an der Oder) ===
Frankfurt an der Oder was allocated 17 seats.

Name	Image	Birth	Death	Notes
Fritz Adam		1889	1945	
Martin Albrecht		1893	1952	
Erich von dem Bach-Zelewski		1899	1972	
Martin Bormann		1900	1945	
Reinhard Bredow		1872	1945	
Eberhard Bütow		1894	1946	
Karl Friedrich		1897	1945	
Siegfried Kasche		1903	1947	
Friedrich-Wilhelm Krüger		1894	1945	
Wilhelm Kube		1887	1943	
Arno Manthey		1888	1941	
Otto Merker		1896	1950	
Michael Münster		1901	1986	
Theodor Adrian von Renteln		1897	1960	
Walter Ruppin		1885	1945	
Werner Schmuck		1899	1940	
Wilhelm Wigand		1895	1945	

=== Constituency 6 (Pomerania) ===
Pomerania was allocated 19 seats.

Name	Image	Birth	Death	Notes
Gottfried Graf von Bismarck-Schönhausen		1901	1949	
Willi Bloedorn		1887	1946	
Walther von Corswant		1886	1942	
Richard Walther Darré		1895	1953	
Willy Fruggel		1885	1957	Expelled, 23 August 1935
Otto Gohdes		1896	1945	
Hermann Harbauer		1899	1945	Replaced Peter von Heydebreck, 4 September 1934
Otto Hergt		1897	1945	
Konstantin Hierl		1875	1955	
Max Heydebreck		1882	1951	
Peter von Heydebreck		1889	1934	Murdered in the Röhm purge, 30 June 1934
Wilhelm Karpenstein		1903	1968	Expelled, 3 August 1934
Kurt Lüdtke		1898	1991	
Max Luyken		1885	1945	
Karl Müller		1879	1944	
Erich von Neindorff		1894	1993	
Adolf Schmidtsdorff		1878	1945	
Siegfried Schug		1898	1961	
Friedrich Graf von der Schulenburg		1865	1939	Replaced Wilhelm Karpenstein, 4 September 1934
Robert Schulz		1900	1974	
Max Tietböhl		1902	unknown	
Otto Wetzel		1905	1982	Replaced Willy Fruggel, 29 August 1935

=== Constituency 7 (Breslau) ===
Breslau was allocated 19 seats.

Name	Image	Birth	Death	Notes
Helmuth Brückner		1896	1951	Expelled, 6 December 1934
Axel von Freytagh-Loringhoven		1878	1942	
Paul Geburtig		1896	1946	
Wilhelm von Grolman		1894	1985	
Wilhelm Heerde		1898	1991	
Richard Hildebrandt		1897	1951	
Hans Huebenett		1896	1940	
Ernst Jenke		1883	1950	
Heinrich Kersken		1894	1960	
Gustav Adolf Kulisch		1903	1982	
Fritz Marx		1900	1985	
Karl Peschke		1882	1943	
Johannes von Reibnitz		1882	1939	
Baldur von Schirach		1907	1974	
Albrecht Schmelt		1899	1945	
Hermann Schneider		1872	1953	
Josef Schönwälder		1897	1972	
Walter Steineck		1889	1942	Replaced Helmuth Brückner, 19 December 1934
Richard Türk		1903	1984	
Udo von Woyrsch		1895	1983	

=== Constituency 8 (Liegnitz) ===
Liegnitz was allocated 12 seats.

Name	Image	Birth	Death	Notes
Hans Frank		1900	1946	
Paul Franke		1892	1961	
Walter Gottschalk		1893	1952	
Edmund Heines		1897	1934	Murdered in the Röhm purge, 30 June 1934
Ferdinand von Hiddessen		1887	1971	Replaced Edmund Heines, 12 July 1934
Kurt Hunholz		1906	1987	
Franz-Werner Jaenke		1905	1943	
Konrad Jenzen		1882	1975	
Rudolf Klieber		1900	1980	Replaced Emil Sembach, 12 July 1934
Hans-Karl Koch		1897	1934	Murdered in the Röhm purge, 1 July 1934
Konrad Ritsch		1906	Missing since 1944	
Emil Sembach		1891	1934	Murdered in the Röhm purge, 1 July 1934
Georg Trzeciak		1886	1968	Replaced Hans-Karl Koch, 12 July 1934
Alwin Uber		1884	unknown	
Max Wockatz		1898	1947	

=== Constituency 9 (Oppeln) ===
Oppeln was allocated 13 seats.

Name	Image	Birth	Death	Notes
Josef Adamczyk		1901	1971	
Werner Altendorf		1906	1945	
Paul Binus		1901	1981	
Max Fillusch		1896	1965	
Paul Hoenscher		1887	1937	
Josef Heukeshoven		1901	1993	
Karl Krichbaum		1899	1971	Replaced Hans Ramshorn, 12 July 1934
Fritz Kleiner		1893	1974	
Richard Preiß		1902	unknown	
Hans Ramshorn		1892	1934	Murdered in the Röhm purge, 1 July 1934
Erich Rußek		1893	1945	
Johannes Slawik		1892	1969	
Wolfgang Graf Yorck von Wartenburg		1899	1944	
Wilhelm Werner		1888	1945	

=== Constituency 10 (Magdeburg) ===
Magdeburg was allocated 17 seats.

Name	Image	Birth	Death	Notes
Georg Ay		1900	1997	
Detlef Dern		1905	1941	Replaced Gustav Leidenroth, 29 August 1935
Joachim Albrecht Eggeling		1884	1945	
Karl Fiedler		1897	1945	
Felix Jacke		1897	1954	
Karl Janowsky		1903	1974	
Paul Krause		1894	1954	Replaced Wilhelm Friedrich Loeper, 5 November 1935
Rudolf Krause		1894	1971	
Fritz Ritter von Kraußer		1888	1934	Murdered in the Röhm purge, 2 July 1934
Erich Krüger		1905	1941	Replaced Konrad Schragmüller, 12 July 1934
Gustav Leidenroth		1885	unknown	Expelled, 27 August 1935
Wilhelm Friedrich Loeper		1883	1935	Died, 23 October 1935
Rudolf Michaelis		1902	1945	
Hermann Müller		1900	1970	
Ludwig Oldarch		1888	1987	Replaced Fritz Ritter von Kraußer, 12 July 1934
Johannes Schäfer		1903	1993	
Alexander Schrader		1887	1956	
Konrad Schragmüller		1895	1934	Murdered in the Röhm purge, 2 July 1934
Karl Selig		1889	1945	
Walter Sommer		1903	Missing since 1942	Expelled, 26 October 1934
Wilhelm Trippler		1905	1941	Replaced Walter Sommer, 10 December 1935
Hans von Tschammer und Osten		1887	1943	

=== Constituency 11 (Merseburg) ===
Merseburg was allocated 15 seats.

Name	Image	Birth	Death	Notes
Georg Altner		1901	1945	
Ludolf von Alvensleben		1901	1970	
Heinrich Bachmann		1903	1945	
Alfred Ernst		1895	1953	
August Hallermann		1896	1966	
Rudolf Jordan		1902	1988	
Max Jüttner		1888	1963	
Paul Schultze-Naumburg		1869	1949	
Karl Simon		1885	1961	
Franz Stöhr		1879	1938	
Fritz Tiebel		1889	1945	
Friedrich Uebelhoer		1893	1950	
Hans Weinreich		1896	1963	
Hans Wolkersdörfer		1893	1966	
Joachim Wünning		1898	1944	

=== Constituency 12 (Thuringia) ===
Thuringia was allocated 23 seats.

Name	Image	Birth	Death	Notes
Herbert Albrecht		1900	1945	
Hans Beeck		1896	1983	Replaced Hans Sauer, 9 July 1934
Heinrich Bichmann		1884	1945	
Wilhelm Busch		1892	1968	
Karl von Eberstein		1894	1979	
Wilhelm Frick		1877	1946	
Kurt Günther		1896	1947	
Paul Hennicke		1883	1967	
Ernst Katzmann		1897	1968	
Kurt Lasch		1886	1977	
Curt Ludwig		1902	1989	
Willy Marschler		1893	1952	
Walter Ortlepp		1900	1971	
Fritz Paschold		1888	1972	
Rudi Peuckert		1908	1946	
Otto Recknagel		1897	1983	
Karl Reinhardt		1905	1968	
Constantin Rembe		1868	1958	
Karl Rompel		1888	1937	
Fritz Sauckel		1894	1946	
Hans Sauer		1894	1934	Died, 14 June 1934
Friedrich Triebel		1888	1960	
Oskar Trübenbach		1900	1992	
Fritz Wächtler		1891	1945	

=== Constituency 13 (Schleswig-Holstein) ===
Schleswig-Holstein was allocated 16 seats.

Name	Image	Birth	Death	Notes
Georg Ahlemann		1870	1945	
Peter Börnsen		1896	1986	
Erich Boetel		1904	1940	
Erich Friedrich		1901	1971	
Hans Gewecke		1906	1991	
Hans Kummerfeldt		1887	1963	
Hinrich Lohse		1896	1964	
Martin Matthiessen		1901	1990	
Joachim Meyer-Quade		1897	1939	
Paul Moder		1896	1942	
Heinrich Schoene		1889	1945	
Ferdinand Schramm		1889	1964	
Bruno Stamer		1900	1988	
Werner Stiehr		1905	1982	
Wilhelm Struve		1901	1982	
Heinrich Wiese		1886	2000	

=== Constituency 14 (Weser-Ems) ===
Weser-Ems was allocated 15 seats.

Name	Image	Birth	Death	Notes
Heinrich Bohnens		1891	1952	
Bruno Dieckelmann		1897	1967	
Jacques Groeneveld		1892	1983	
Hans Gronewald		1893	1972	
Otto Herzog		1900	1945	
Heinrich Himmler		1900	1945	
Wilhelm Kronsbein		1884	1972	
Franz Metzner		1895	1970	
Gustav Nietfeld-Beckmann		1896	1961	
Karl Poppe		1896	1965	
Carl Röver		1889	1942	
Wilhelm Freiherr von Schorlemer		1888	1965	
Josef Ständer		1894	1976	
Kurt Thiele		1896	1969	
Paul Wegener		1908	1993	

=== Constituency 15 (East Hanover) ===
East Hanover was allocated 11 seats.

Name	Image	Birth	Death	Notes
Paul Brusch		1884	unknown	
Walter Buch		1883	1949	
Fritz Fröhlich		1901	1961	
Otto Gakenholz		1890	1973	
Adolf Heincke		1901	1986	
Adalbert Herwig		1901	1961	
Paul Holthoff		1897	1967	
Friedrich Jeckeln		1895	1946	
Friedrich-Wilhelm Lütt		1902	1973	
Otto Telschow		1876	1945	
Otto Wilkins		1907	1999	

=== Constituency 16 (South Hanover–Braunschweig) ===
South Hanover–Braunschweig was allocated 20 seats.

Name	Image	Birth	Death	Notes
Friedrich Bolte		1896	1959	Expelled, 26 November 1934
Otto Buchheister		1893	1966	
Andreas Dornieden		1887	1976	Replaced Heinrich Schmidt, 15 February 1936
Otto von Feldman		1873	1945	
Berthold Karwahne		1887	1957	
Hanns Kerrl		1887	1941	
Dietrich Klagges		1891	1971	
Wilhelm Koppe		1896	1975	
Felix Kopprasch		1891	1946	
Heinrich von Kozierowski		1889	1967	
Werner Kropp		1899	1946	Replaced Friedrich Bolte, 10 December 1934
Vistor Lutze		1890	1943	
Franz Pfeffer von Salomon		1888	1968	
Bernhard Rust		1883	1945	
Kurt Schmalz		1906	1964	
Adolf Schmidt-Bodenstedt		1904	1981	
Heinrich Schmidt		1902	1960	Resigned, 28 January 1936
Gustav Schwiebert		1894	1960	
Heinrich Soest		1897	1962	
Fritz Vielstich		1895	1965	
Werner Willikens		1893	1961	
Ludwig Winter		1894	1956	

=== Constituency 17 (Westphalia North) ===
Westphalia North was allocated 25 seats.

Name	Image	Birth	Death	Notes
Karl Dreier		1898	1974	
Paul Faßbach		1897	1945	
Curt Fischer		1901	1945	
Paul Franke		1892	1961	
Heinrich Göckenjan		1900	1986	
Erich Hartmann		1896	1976	
Karl Heidemann		1895	1975	
August Heißmeyer		1897	1979	
Friedrich Homann		1891	1937	
Fritz Emil Irrgang		1890	1951	
Bernd Freiherr von Kanne		1884	1967	
Albert Kost		1897	1947	
Alfred Meyer		1891	1945	
Walter Nagel		1901	1943	Expelled, 3 August 1934
Hans-Joachim Riecke		1899	1986	
Hans Saupert		1897	1966	
Paul Schmidt		1901	1977	
Otto Schramme		1899	1941	
Ferdinand Schürmann		1896	1966	Replaced Walter Nagel, 4 September 1934
Karl Schulz		1905	1989	
Fritz Springorum		1886	1942	
Peter Stangier		1898	1962	
Walter Steinecke		1888	1975	
Hans Ummen		1894	1982	
Adolf Wedderwille		1895	1947	
Wilhelm Witthaus		1900	1974	

=== Constituency 18 (Westphalia South) ===
Westphalia South was allocated 25 seats.

Name	Image	Birth	Death	Notes
Günther Arndt		1894	1975	Replaced Edmund Forschbach, 11 July 1934
Philipp Bouhler		1899	1945	
Fritz Bracht		1899	1945	
Hein Diehl		1896	1964	
Wilhelm Fischer		1906	1965	
Edmund Forschbach		1903	1988	Expelled, 10 July 1934
Paul Giesler		1895	1945	
Wilhelm Habbes		1896	1948	
Heinrich August Knickmann		1894	1941	
Franz Land		1896	1974	
Lorenz Loewer		1900	1992	
Richard Manderbach		1889	1962	
Wilhelm Meinberg		1898	1973	
Albert Meister		1895	1942	
Erhard Müller		1906	1969	
Ernst Riemenschneider		1900	1960	
Wilhelm Römer		1900	1962	
Karl Sattler		1891	1958	
Wilhelm Schepmann		1894	1970	
Fritz Schleßmann		1900	1964	
Ernst Stein		1906	1943	
Emil Sturtz		1892	1945	
Albert Trumpetter		1906	1964	
Heinrich Vetter		1890	1969	
Albert Vögler		1877	1945	
Josef Wagner		1899	1945	

=== Constituency 19 (Hesse-Nassau) ===
Hesse-Nassau was allocated 27 seats.

Name	Image	Birth	Death	Notes
Willy Becker		1890	1945	
Adolf Beckerle		1902	1976	
Rudolf Braun		1889	1975	
Hans Dippel		1893	1945	
Helmuth Friedrichs		1899	1945	
Roland Freisler		1893	1945	
Adalbert Gimbel		1898	1973	
Theodor Habicht		1898	1944	
Walter Kramer		1903	1983	Expelled, 23 March 1935
Hans Krawielitzki		1900	1992	
Fritz Lengemann		1892	1934	Died, 30 May 1934
Karl Linder		1900	1979	
Johannes Lommel		1875	1939	
Carl Lüer		1897	1969	
Hermann Neef		1904	1950	
Hanns Oberlindober		1896	1949	
Johannes Puth		1900	1957	
Fritz Schmidt		1899	1942	
Wilhelm Georg Schmidt		1900	1938	
Walther Seidler		1897	1952	
Jakob Sprenger		1884	1945	
Willi Stöhr		1903	unknown	
Lothar Steuer		1893	1957	
Wilhelm Thiele		1897	1990	Replaced Walter Kramer, 23 April 1935
Curt von Ulrich		1876	1946	
Karl Vetter		1895	1964	
Karl Weinrich		1887	1973	
Fritz Weitzel		1904	1940	
Franz Woweries		1908	1948	Replaced Fritz Lengemann, 19 June 1934

=== Constituency 20 (Cologne–Aachen) ===
Cologne–Aachen was allocated 22 seats.

Name	Image	Birth	Death	Notes
Walter Aldinger		1904	1945	
Franz Binz		1896	1965	
Carl Ludwig Doerr		1887	1954	
Otto Dörrenberg		1888	1961	
Kuno von Eltz-Rübenach		1904	1945	
Josef Grohé		1902	1987	
Heinrich Haake		1892	1945	
Fred Henrich		1898	1984	Resigned, 4 October 1935
Walter Hoevel		1894	1956	
Lorenz Hoffstätter		1904	1987	
Robert Ley		1890	1945	
Fritz Marrenbach		1896	1967	
Adolf Marx		1898	1977	
Josef Odendall		1890	1968	
Richard Ohling		1908	1985	
Carl Reuter		1900	1979	
Richard Schaller		1903	1972	
Rudolf Schmeer		1905	1966	
Karl Friedrich Freiherr von Schorlemer		1886	1936	
Martin Spahn		1875	1945	
Konrad Volm		1897	1958	Replaced Fred Henrich, 4 October 1935
Toni Winkelnkemper		1905	1968	
Lucian Wysocki		1899	1964	

=== Constituency 21 (Koblenz–Trier) ===
Koblenz–Trier was allocated 12 seats.

Name	Image	Birth	Death	Notes
Karl Brück		1895	1964	
Otto Dreyer		1903	1986	
Hermann Funken		1891	1970	
Albert Müller		1895	1945	
Ernst Ludwig Pies		1885	1942	
Fritz Reckmann		1907	1984	
Ernst Schmitt		1901	1972	
Peter Schmitt		1901	1985	
Gustav Simon		1900	1945	
Otto Wagener		1888	1971	
August Wetter		1890	1970	
Carl Zenner		1899	1969	

=== Constituency 22 (Düsseldorf East) ===
Düsseldorf East was allocated 22 seats.

Name	Image	Birth	Death	Notes
Wilhelm Becker		1891	1957	
Wilhelm Borger		1896	1962	
Oskar Druschel		1904	1944	
Rudolf Feick		1900	1945	
Friedrich Karl Florian		1894	1975	
Otto Frowein		1899	1945	
Erich Fuchs		1894	1945	
Heinrich Ilbertz		1891	1974	
Heinz-Hugo John		1904	1944	
Werner Keyßner		1903	1969	
Josef Klein		1890	1952	
Ludwig Kraft		1900	1991	
Theodor Oppermann		1889	1945	
Heinrich Pahlings		1904	1947	
Johannes von Reibnitz		1882	1939	
Erwin Rösener		1902	1946	
Wilhelm Schumann		1899	unknown	
Ernst Schwarz		1904	1941	
Jakob Sporrenberg		1902	1952	
Alfred Straßweg		1902	1997	
Fritz Thyssen		1873	1951	
Gotthard Urban		1905	1941	

=== Constituency 23 (Düsseldorf West) ===
Düsseldorf West was allocated 19 seats.

Name	Image	Birth	Death	Notes
Wilhelm Beyer		1885	1945	
Otto Dahlem		1891	1980	
Hermann Freytag		1900	1962	
Friedrich Grimm		1888	1959	
Karl Gutenberger		1905	1961	
Hermann Hansen		1898	1973	Replaced Gottfried Krummacher, 19 June 1934
Heinrich Hockermann		1900	1980	
Fritz Johlitz		1893	1974	
Gottfried Krummacher		1892	1954	Resigned, May 1934
Hans Louis Ferdinand von Löwenstein zu Löwenstein		1874	1959	
Heinrich Niem		1906	1944	
Friedrich Neven		1902	1971	
Friedrich Peppmüller		1892	1972	
Heinz Roch		1905	1945	
Emil Schultz		1899	1946	
Josef Terboven		1898	1945	
Heinrich Unger		1868	1939	
Josias zu Waldeck und Pyrmont		1896	1967	
Hermann Zapf		1886	1957	
Karl Zech		1892	1944	

=== Constituency 24 (Upper Bavaria–Swabia) ===
Upper Bavaria–Swabia was allocated 27 seats.

Name	Image	Birth	Death	Notes
Max Amann		1891	1957	
Josef Bauer		1881	1958	
Georg Biederer		1900	1967	
Franz Buchner		1898	1967	
Hanns Bunge		1898	1966	
Rudolf Buttmann		1885	1947	
Hans Dauser		1877	1969	
Johann Deininger		1896	1973	
Franz von Epp		1868	1947	
Hermann Esser		1900	1981	
Karl Fiehler		1895	1969	
Kurt Frey		1902	1945	
Friedrich Haselmayr		1879	1965	
Wilhelm Helfer		1886	1954	
Adolf Hitler		1889	1945	
Arthur Holzmann		1880	1969	
Anton Mündler		1896	1945	
Otto Nippold		1902	1940	
Fritz Reinhardt		1895	1969	
Josef Riggauer		1879	1952	
Georg Schädler		1887	1971	
Ernst-Heinrich Schmauser		1890	1945	
Wilhelm Schwarz		1902	1975	
Ludwig Siebert		1874	1942	
Adolf Wagner		1890	1944	
Karl Wahl		1882	1981	
Karl Wenzl		1903	1942	

=== Constituency 25 (Lower Bavaria–Upper Palatinate) ===
Lower Bavaria––Upper Palatinate was allocated 13 seats.

Name	Image	Birth	Death	Notes
Peter Bell		1889	1939	
Josef Dietrich		1892	1966	
Otto Erbersdobler		1895	1981	
Hermann Grassl		1896	1969	
Hans Georg Hofmann		1873	1942	
Artur Kolb		1895	1945	
Max Moosbauer		1892	1968	
Alfred Pfaff		1872	1954	
Georg Poxleitner		1898	1964	
Arthur Rakobrandt		1878	1948	
Ludwig Ruckdeschel		1907	1986	
Hans Schiffmann		1889	1955	
Karl Schlumprecht		1901	1970	

=== Constituency 26 (Franconia) ===
Franconia was allocated 26 seats.

Name	Image	Birth	Death	Notes
Johann Appler		1892	1978	
Theo Benesch		1899	1954	
Robert Bergmann		1886	1966	Expelled, 6 December 1934
Hugo Bruckmann		1863	1941	
Albert Forster		1902	1952	
Richard Gehrig		1897	1978	
Georg Gradl		1884	1950	
August Greim		1895	1975	
Wilhelm Grimm		1889	1944	
Rudolf Gugel		1908	1945	
Heinrich Hager		1893	1941	
Willi Heer		1894	1961	
Otto Hellmuth		1896	1968	
Adolf Hergenröder		1896	1945	
Karl Holz		1895	1945	
Xaver Knaup		1893	1950	
Hanns König		1904	1939	
Karl Minnameyer		1891	1973	Replaced Robert Bergmann, 10 December 1934
Hans Schemm		1891	1934	Died, 5 March 1935
Franz Xaver Schlemmer		1895	1952	Replaced Hans Schemm, 18 March 1935
Eduard Ritter von Schleich		1888	1947	
Fritz Schuberth		1897	1977	
Franz Xaver Schwarz		1875	1947	
Franz Schwede		1888	1960	
Georg Sperber		1897	1943	
Julius Streicher		1885	1946	
Philipp Wurzbacher		1898	1984	
Lorenz Zahneisen		1897	1950	

=== Constituency 27 (Palatinate) ===
The Palatinate was originally allocated 10 seats. After the return of the Saar to Germany on 1 March 1935, it was merged with the Palatinate and the electoral district was renamed Palatinate–Saar. An additional 8 deputies were admitted to the Reichstag from this district.

Name	Image	Birth	Death	Notes
Josef Bürckel		1895	1944	
Ernst Dürrfeld		1898	1945	Entered representing the Saar, 1 March 1935
Kurt Eichner		1898	1969	Entered representing the Saar, 1 March 1935
Fritz Heß		1879	1938	
Peter Kiefer		1884	1945	Entered representing the Saar, 1 March 1935
Ernst Ludwig Leyser		1896	1973	
Ludwig Liebel		1887	1962	
Max Luyken		1885	1945	
Heinrich Nietmann		1901	1961	Entered representing the Saar, 1 March 1935
Rudolf Röhrig		1903	1970	
Peter Schaub		1897	1945	Entered representing the Saar, 1 March 1935
Ludwig Schickert		1901	1951	Expelled, 31 January 1935
Willy Schmelcher		1894	1974	
Franz Schubert		1905	1992	Entered representing the Saar, 1 March 1935
Fritz Schwitzgebel		1888	1957	
Nikolaus Selzner		1899	1944	
Gerhard Wagner		1888	1939	
Julius Weber		1904	1942	Entered representing the Saar, 1 March 1935
Wilhelm Welter		1898	1966	Entered representing the Saar, 1 March 1935
Leonhard Wüchner		1895	1945	Replaced Ludwig Schickert, 21 February 1935

=== Constituency 28 (Dresden–Bautzen) ===
Dresden–Bautzen was allocated 20 seats.

Name	Image	Birth	Death	Notes
Helmut Böhme		1902	1945	
Georg von Detten		1887	1934	Murdered in the Röhm purge, 1 July 1934
Hans Döring		1901	1970	
Arthur Hugo Göpfert		1902	1986	
Karl Götz		1888	1954	Replaced Hans Hayn, 12 July 1934
Curt Haase		1897	unknown	
Hans Hayn		1896	1934	Murdered in the Röhm purge, 1 July 1934
Wilhelm Heuber		1898	1957	
Eugen Holdingshausen		1890	1937	
Karl Horn		1898	1977	
Ernst Ittameier		1888	1954	Replaced Georg von Detten, 12 July 1934
Manfred von Killinger		1886	1944	
Hellmut Körner		1904	1966	
Cuno Meyer		1893	1981	
Walter Neul		1899	1971	
Willy Reichelt		1880	1946	
Josef Alois Reinhart		1899	1977	
Hans Reiter		1901	1973	
Georg Schroeder		1898	1969	
Joseph Seydel		1887	1945	
Paul Sterzing		1901	unknown	
Paul Unterstab		1895	1944	

=== Constituency 29 (Leipzig) ===
Leipzig was allocated 13 seats.

Name	Image	Birth	Death	Notes
Hermann Groine		1897	1941	
Paul Hocheisen		1870	1944	
Karl Martin		1893	1974	
Otto Naumann		1895	1965	
Richard Owe		1889	1970	
Paul Arthur Rabe		1903	1976	
Wilhelm Rosenbaum		1880	1938	Replaced Erich Schneider, 7 November 1935
Paul Schaaf		1888	1979	
Erich Schneider		1891	1935	Died, 28 October 1935
Wilhelm Schroeder		1898	1943	
Karl Sieber		1888	1946	
Heinz Spangemacher		1885	1958	Replaced Bertram Weiler, 30 January 1934
Werner Studentkowski		1903	1951	
Bertram Weiler		1898	1972	Resigned, 13 December 1933
Oskar Zschake-Papsdorf		1902	1944	

=== Constituency 30 (Chemnitz–Zwickau) ===
Chemnitz–Zwickau was allocated 19 seats.

Name	Image	Birth	Death	Notes
Robert Bauer		1898	1965	
Wilhelm Bösing		1902	1949	Replaced Wilhelm Schmid, 12 July 1934
Ewald Dost		1897	1945	
Paul Drechsel		1888	1953	
Karl Fritsch		1901	1944	
Willy Grothe		1886	1959	
Arthur Heß		1891	1959	
Michael Heuschneider		1888	1936	
Alfons Hitzler		1897	1945	
Martin Jordan		1897	1945	
Walter Kaul		1903	1967	
Erich Kunz		1897	1939	
Georg Lenk		1888	1946	
Kurt Martius		1903	1969	
Martin Mutschmann		1879	1947	
Ernst Mutz		1900	1952	
Franz Pillmayer		1897	1939	
Wilhelm Schmid		1889	1934	Murdered in the Röhm purge, 30 June 1934
Ernst Stiehler		1887	1964	
Peter Vogt		1897	1941	

=== Constituency 31 (Württemberg) ===
Württemberg was allocated 28 seats.

Name	Image	Birth	Death	Notes
Alfred Arnold		1888	1960	
Philipp Baetzner		1897	1961	
Wilhelm Bisse		1881	1946	
Karl Dempel		1897	1967	
Richard Drauz		1894	1946	
Wilhelm Dreher		1892	1969	
Franz Gutsmiedl		1901	1943	
Ernst Huber		1902	1982	
Adolf Hühnlein		1881	1942	
Dietrich von Jagow		1892	1945	
Fritz Kiehn		1885	1980	
Emil Kiener		1900	1961	
Adolf Kling		1893	1938	
Martin Kohler		1894	1973	
Eugen Maier		1899	1940	
Otto Maier		1901	1934	Died, 18 July 1934
Josef Malzer		1902	1954	
Wilhelm Murr		1888	1945	
Gustav Robert Oexle		1889	1945	Replaced Otto Maier, 4 September 1934
Eugen Graf von Quadt zu Wykradt und Isny		1887	1940	
Friedrich Schmidt		1902	1973	
Albert Schüle		1890	1947	
Friedrich Schulz		1897	1965	
Hans Seibold		1904	1974	
Franz Schenk Freiherr von Stauffenberg		1877	1950	
Otto Sommer		1891	1940	
Vinzenz Stehle		1901	1967	
Anton Vogt		1891	1976	
Robert Zeller		1895	1966	

=== Constituency 32 (Baden) ===
Baden was allocated 24 seats.

Name	Image	Birth	Death	Notes
Christoph Diehm		1892	1960	
Albert Hackelsberger		1893	1940	
Ludwig Huber		1889	1946	
Friedhelm Kemper		1906	1990	
Wilhelm Keppler		1882	1960	
Walter Köhler		1897	1989	
Herbert Kraft		1886	1946	Replaced Josef Wasmer, 19 June 1934
August Kramer		1900	1979	
Hanns Ludin		1905	1947	
Franz Merk		1894	1945	
Karl Pflaumer		1896	1971	
Friedrich Plattner		1901	1960	
Theo Rehm		1896	1970	
Hermann Röhn		1902	1946	
Albert Roth		1893	1952	
Reinhold Roth		1900	1985	
Robert Roth		1891	1975	
Oskar Stäbel		1901	1977	
Adalbert Ullmer		1896	1966	
Otto Wacker		1900	1940	
Robert Heinrich Wagner		1895	1946	
Josef Wasmer		1902	1934	Died, 30 May 1934
Curt Wittje		1905	1982	
Konrad Zahn		1891	1980	
Willy Ziegler		1899	1942	

=== Constituency 33 (Hesse-Darmstadt) ===
Hesse-Darmstadt was allocated 14 seats.

Name	Image	Birth	Death	Notes
Daniel Hauer		1879	1945	
Willy Herbert		1904	1969	
Walter Heyse		1902	1980	
Fritz Kern		1903	1945	
Alfred Klostermann		1900	1945	
Karl Lenz		1899	1944	
Ludwig Münchmeyer		1885	1947	
Friedrich Ringshausen		1880	1941	
Alfred Rosenberg		1893	1946	
Gustav Schmidt		1898	1972	
August Schneidhuber		1887	1934	Murdered in the Röhm purge, 30 June 1934
Wilhelm Schwinn		1897	1967	
Martin Seidel		1898	1945	Replaced August Schneidhuber, 4 September 1934
Wilhelm Seipel		1903	1967	
Richard Wagner		1902	1973	

=== Constituency 34 (Hamburg) ===
Hamburg was allocated 12 seats.

Name	Image	Birth	Death	Notes
Werner Ballauff		1890	1973	
Hellmuth Becker		1902	1962	
Ernst Wilhelm Bohle		1903	1960	
Friedrich Boschmann		1903	1965	
Carl Gottfried Gok		1869	1945	
Rudolf Habedank		1893	1969	
Karl Kaufmann		1900	1969	
Fritz Meyer		1881	1953	
Carl Penzhorn		1866	1956	
Walter Raeke		1878	1959	
Helmut Reinke		1897	1969	
Robert Schormann		1906	1962	

=== Constituency 35 (Mecklenburg) ===
Mecklenburg was allocated 9 seats.

Name	Image	Birth	Death	Notes
Hermann Behme		1900	1969	
Herbert Fust		1899	1974	
Walter Granzow		1887	1952	
Friedrich Hildebrandt		1898	1948	
Rudolf Schildmann		1902	1987	
Walther Schröder		1902	1973	
Karl Seemann		1886	1943	
Emil Georg von Stauss		1877	1942	
Paul Vorbeck		1899	1946	
