= List of German National People's Party politicians =

A list of notable politicians of the defunct German National People's Party:

== A ==
- Albert Abicht
- Dirk Agena, de:Dirk Agena
- Bodo von Alvensleben, de:Bodo von Alvensleben
- Udo von Alvensleben, de:Udo von Alvensleben (Politiker)
- Detlev von Arnim-Kröchlendorff, de:Detlev von Arnim-Kröchlendorff

== B ==
- Julius Bachem, de:Julius Bachem (Politiker, 1887)
- Georg Bachmann
- Paul Baecker, de:Paul Baecker
- Max von Bahrfeldt
- Paul Bang
- Georg Barth, de:Georg Barth
- Wilhelm Bazille
- Johann Becker
- Margarete Behm
- Franz Behrens, de:Franz Behrens (Politiker)
- Emil Berndt, de:Emil Berndt
- Georg Best, de:Georg Best
- Franz Biener, de:Franz Biener
- Fritz Oswald Bilse
- Herbert von Bismarck
- Otto Christian Archibald von Bismarck
- August Böhm, de:August Böhm (Politiker)
- Maria Böhmer
- Joseph Borchmeyer, de:Joseph Borchmeyer
- Robert Börner, de:Robert Börner
- Wolfgang Börnsen
- Kurt von Borries, de:Kurt von Borries (Politiker)
- Peter Bossen, de:Peter Bossen
- Ivo von Bothmer, de:Ivo von Bothmer
- Albert Brackmann
- Joachim Brandenstein, de:Joachim von Brandenstein (Jurist)
- Ernst Brandes
- Friedrich Brands, de:Friedrich Brands
- Heinrich Brauer, de:Heinrich Brauer (Politiker)
- Friedrich von Braun, de:Friedrich von Braun
- Magnus Freiherr von Braun
- Carl Brekelbaum, de:Carl Brekelbaum
- Cecilie Brickenstein, de:Cecilie Brickenstein
- Cay Baron von Brockdorff, de:Cay Baron von Brockdorff
- Eugen von Brockhausen der Jüngere, de:Eugen von Brockhausen der Jüngere
- Otto Bremer
- Michael Brückner, de:Michael Brückner (Politiker, 1871)
- Wilhelm Bruhn, de:Wilhelm Bruhn (Politiker)
- Ernst Brunk, de:Ernst Brunk
- Hans Brunow, de:Hans Brunow (Politiker)
- Walter Buch
- Gustav Budjuhn, de:Gustav Budjuhn
- Gustav Bundt, de:Gustav Bundt
- Carl Albert Bunnemann
- Kurt von Burgsdorff, de:Kurt von Burgsdorff
- Heinrich Burmeister, de:Heinrich Burmeister
- Rudolf Buttmann

== C ==
- Philipp Christ, de:Philipp Christ (Politiker, 1867)
- Max Conradt, de:Max Conradt
- Leonardo Conti
- Erich Cordua, de:Erich Cordua
- Walter Cramer

== D ==
- Diedrich Dannemann, de:Diedrich Dannemann
- Hermann von Dassel, de:Hermann von Dassel
- Friedrich Deerberg, de:Friedrich Deerberg
- Friedrich von Degenfeld-Schonburg, de:Friedrich von Degenfeld-Schonburg
- Kurt Deglerk, de:Kurt Deglerk
- Alfred Dehlinger, de:Alfred Dehlinger
- Clemens von Delbrück
- Friedrich Dermietzel, de:Friedrich Dermietzel
- Georg Dertinger
- Johann Georg von Dewitz, de:Johann Georg von Dewitz
- Otto Dibelius
- Hermann Dietrich, de:Hermann Dietrich (Politiker, 1856)
- Heinrich Dietze, de:Heinrich Dietze
- Herbert von Dirksen
- Wilhelm von Ditfurth, de:Wilhelm von Ditfurth (General, 1874)
- Ernst von Dobschütz
- Friedrich Döbrich, de:Friedrich Döbrich
- Bruno Doehring
- Max Dolezych, de:Max Dolezych
- Alwin Domsch, de:Alwin Domsch
- Wilhelm Dorsch, de:Wilhelm Dorsch
- Gottfried von Dryander, de:Gottfried von Dryander
- Theodor Duesterberg

== E ==
- Emil Ebersbach, de:Emil Ebersbach
- Karl von Eberstein
- Paul Eggers, de:Paul Eggers
- Hans Ellenbeck, de:Hans Ellenbeck
- Konrad Ende, de:Konrad Ende
- Franz Etzel
- Botho-Wendt zu Eulenburg, de:Botho-Wendt zu Eulenburg
- Friedrich Everling
- Hanns Heinz Ewers

== F ==
- Otto von Feldmann
- Karl Fischer, de:Karl Fischer (Politiker, 1871)
- Alfred Fletcher
- Edmund Forschbach
- Hermann von der Forst, de:Hermann von der Forst
- Axel von Freytagh-Loringhoven
- Kurt Wilhelm Fromm, de:Kurt Wilhelm Fromm
- Josef Fürst, de:Josef Fürst (Politiker)

== G ==
- Max von Gallwitz
- Hubertus von Garnier, de:Hubertus von Garnier
- Wilhelm Gauger, de:Wilhelm Gauger (Politiker)
- Wilhelm von Gayl
- Reinhard von Gehren, de:Reinhard von Gehren
- Fritz Geisler, de:Fritz Geisler
- Günther Gereke
- Heinrich Gerns, de:Heinrich Gerns
- Anna von Gierke
- Paul Giese, de:Paul Giese (Politiker)
- Paul Giesler
- Carl Friedrich Goerdeler
- Fritz Goerdeler
- Carl Gottfried Gok
- Hans von Goldacker, de:Hans von Goldacker
- Georg Gottheiner, de:Georg Gottheiner
- Robert Grabow, de:Robert Grabow
- Walther Graef, de:Walther Graef (Politiker, 1873)
- Albrecht von Graefe
- Max von Gruber
- Alexander von Grunelius, de:Alexander von Grunelius (Landrat)
- Robert Günther, de:Robert Günther (Politiker, 1874)
- Franz Gürtner

== H ==
- Heinrich Haag, de:Heinrich Haag
- Karl Haedenkamp, de:Karl Haedenkamp
- Franz Hänse, de:Franz Hänse
- Dietrich Hahne, de:Dietrich Hahne (Politiker)
- Alfred Hanemann, de:Alfred Hanemann
- Friedrich Hammer, de:Friedrich Hammer (Politiker)
- Gustav Harmnony, de:Gustav Harmony
- Georg Hartmann, de:Georg Hartmann (Politiker, 1875)
- Rudolf Hartmann, de:Rudolf Hartmann (Politiker, 1856)
- Emil Hartwig, de:Emil Hartwig (Politiker)
- Ulrich von Hassell
- Karl Helfferich
- Hans Helfritz
- Emil Hemeter, de:Emil Hemeter
- Wilhelm Henning
- Paul Hensel
- Oskar Hergt
- Katharina Hertwig, de:Katharina Hertwig
- Hans Heyck
- Albrecht von Heyden-Linden, de:Albrecht von Heyden-Linden
- Elsa Hielscher-Panten, de:Elsa Hielscher-Panten
- Friedrich Hildebrandt
- Ernst Hintzmann, de:Ernst Hintzmann
- Otto Hoetzsch
- Otto Hoffmann de:Otto Hoffmann (Sprachwissenschaftler)
- Alfred Hugenberg
- Gustav Hülser, de:Gustav Hülser

== J ==
- Friedrich Jacobshagen, de:Friedrich Jacobshagen
- Wilhelm Jaeger, de:Wilhelm Jaeger (Politiker)
- Jost de Jager
- Willy Jandrey, de:Willy Jandrey
- Johannes Janssen, de:Johannes Janssen (Politiker)
- Friedrich Jeckeln
- Leo von Jena
- Hermann Julier, de:Hermann Julier

== K ==
- Karl Otto von Kameke, de:Karl Otto von Kameke
- Siegfried von Kardorff
- Hans Arthur von Kemnitz, de:Hans Arthur von Kemnitz
- Eduard Kenkel, de:Eduard Kenkel
- Johannes van den Kerkhoff, de:Johannes van den Kerkhoff
- Walter von Keudell
- Margarete Gräfin Keyserlingk, de:Margarete Gräfin Keyserlingk
- Robert von Keyserlingk-Cammerau, de:Robert von Keyserlingk-Cammerau
- Karl Hans Kickhöffel, de:Karl Hans Kickhöffel
- Otto Kind, de:Otto Kind
- Dietrich Klagges
- Richard Klein, de:Richard Klein (Politiker, 1888)
- Fritz Kleiner
- Ewald von Kleist-Schmenzin
- Wilko von Klüchtzner, de:Wilko von Klüchtzner
- Wilhelm Koch, de:Wilhelm Koch (Politiker, 1877)
- Walter Köhler
- Hans Koennecke, de:Hans Koennecke
- Theodor Christian Körner, de:Theodor Christian Körner
- Wolfgang von Kries, de:Wolfgang von Kries
- Friedrich Krug von Nidda und von Falkenstein, de:Friedrich Krug von Nidda und von Falkenstein
- Wilhelm Kube
- Werner Küchenthal
- Karl Kuhnke, de:Karl Kuhnke
- Richard Kunze
- Fritz Kupfrian, de:Fritz Kupfrian
- Wilhelm Kutscher

== L ==
- Hans Heinrich Lammers
- Friedrich Landfried
- Wilhelm Laverrenz, de:Wilhelm Laverrenz
- Annagrete Lehmann, de:Annagrete Lehmann
- Robert Lehr
- Paul Lejeune-Jung
- Bernhard Leopold, de:Bernhard Leopold
- Paul von Lettow-Vorbeck
- Heinrich Lind, de:Heinrich Lind
- Hans-Erdmann von Lindeiner genannt von Wildau, de:Hans-Erdmann von Lindeiner genannt von Wildau
- Diederich Logemann, de:Diederich Logemann
- Karl Lohmann
- Hans Louis Ferdinand von Löwenstein zu Löwenstein
- Hans von Ludwiger, de:Hans von Ludwiger
- Ferdinand von Lüninck
- Hermann von Lüninck

== M ==
- Ernst Martin
- Max Maurenbrecher
- Fritz Maxin
- Werner Meinhof
- Otto Mentz, de:Otto Mentz
- Ernst Mentzel, de:Ernst Mentzel
- Felix von Merveldt, de:Felix von Merveldt
- Georg Michaelis
- Theodor Milberg, de:Theodor Milberg
- Alfred Möllers, de:Alfred Möllers
- Reinhold Muchow
- Robert Müller, de:Robert Müller (Politiker, 1872)
- Paula Müller-Otfried
- Reinhard Mumm, de:Reinhard Mumm
- Ludwig Münchmeyer

== N ==
- Albert Neuhaus
- Erich Neumann

== O ==
- Ernst Oberfohren - de:Ernst Oberfohren (1881–1933)
- Wilhelm Ohler, de:Wilhelm Ohler
- Elard von Oldenburg-Januschau

== P ==
- Theodor Paeth, de:Theodor Paeth
- Alexander Pagenstecher, de:Alexander Pagenstecher (Politiker)
- Hugo Paul
- Theodor von der Pfordten
- Hans Pfundtner
- Albrecht Philipp, de:Albrecht Philipp
- Ernst Poensgen
- Ernst Pöhner
- Arthur von Posadowsky-Wehner
- Oskar von Preußen
- Dietrich Preyer, de:Dietrich Preyer
- Carl Friedrich von Pückler-Burghauss

== Q ==
- Reinhold Quaatz

== R ==
- Arno Rauscher
- Anna Therese Rawengel, de:Anna Therese Rawengel
- Jakob Wilhelm Reichert, de:Jakob Wilhelm Reichert
- Horst von Restorff, de:Horst von Restorff
- Adolf Richter, de:Adolf Richter (Politiker, 1881)
- Johanna Richter, de:Johanna Richter (Politikerin)
- Prätorius von Richthofen, de:Prätorius von Richthofen
- Robert Rive
- Hans Joachim von Rohr-Demmin
- Alfred Roth

== S ==
- Georg Sattler (politician), de:Georg Sattler (Politiker)
- Ulrike Scheidel, de:Ulrike Scheidel
- Martin Schiele
- Gustav Schiller, de:Gustav Schiller
- Karl Schimmelpfennig, de:Karl Schimmelpfennig (Politiker)
- Käthe Schirmacher
- Ernst Schlange
- Otto von Schlieben
- Erich Schmidt, de:Erich Schmidt (Verleger)
- Otto Schlüter
- Otto Schmidt-Hannover - de:Otto Schmidt-Hannover (1888–1971)
- August Schneider, de:August Schneider (Politiker, 1879)
- Bruno Schneider, de:Bruno Schneider (Politiker)
- Karl Friedrich Freiherr von Schorlemer
- Paul Schulze
- Reinhard Schulze-Stapen, de:Reinhard Schulze-Stapen
- Ludwig Schwecht, de:Ludwig Schwecht
- Hans Bogislav Graf von Schwerin, de:Hans Bogislav Graf von Schwerin
- Max Schwobe, de:Max Schwobe
- Erich Seelmann-Eggebert, de:Erich Seelmann-Eggebert
- Franz Seldte
- Friedrich-Wilhelm Semmler
- Hermann von Siemens
- Max Soth, de:Max Soth
- Martin Spahn - de:Martin Spahn (1875-1945)
- Else von Sperber, de:Else von Sperber
- Elisabeth Spohr, de:Elisabeth Spohr
- Fritz Springorum
- Eduard Stadtler
- Hermann Staffehl, de:Hermann Staffehl
- Franz Schenk Freiherr von Stauffenberg
- Wilm von Stein-Liebenstein, de:Wilm von Stein-Liebenstein
- Günther von Steinau-Steinrück. de:Günther von Steinau-Steinrück
- Werner Steinhoff - de: Werner Steinhoff (1875-1949)
- Karl Steiniger, de:Karl Steiniger
- Hans Steinmann, de:Hans Steinmann (Politiker)
- Lothar Steuer
- Hermann Stieve
- Hermann Strathmann
- Walter Stubbendorff, de:Walter Stubbendorff
- Karl von Stünzner-Karbe, de:Karl von Stünzner-Karbe

== T ==
- Wilhelm Teudt
- Fritz Thyssen
- Magdalene von Tiling, de:Magdalene von Tiling
- Erich Timm
- Alfred von Tirpitz
- Gottfried Treviranus
- Thilo von Trotha, de:Thilo von Trotha (Politiker, 1882)

== V ==
- Erich Vagts
- Julius Vogel (politician) (1888-1964), de:Julius Vogel (Politiker)

== W ==
- Wilhelm von Waldthausen, de:Wilhelm von Waldthausen
- Wilhelm Wallbaum
- Max Wallraf
- Helene von Watter, de:Helene von Watter
- Kurt Wege, de:Kurt Wege (Politiker, 1881)
- Gustav Wenzlaff, de:Gustav Wenzlaff
- Ferdinand Werner
- Kuno von Westarp
- Fritz Wider, de:Fritz Wider
- Albert Wiedemann, de:Albert Wiedemann
- Erich Wienbeck, de:Erich Wienbeck
- Johann Friedrich Winckler - de: Johann Friedrich Winckler (Politiker), (1856–1943)
- Kurt von Wilmowsky, de:Kurt von Wilmowsky
- Tilo von Wilmowsky, de:Tilo von Wilmowsky
- Friedrich von Winterfeld, de:Friedrich von Winterfeld (Jurist)
- Johannes Wolf, de:Johannes Wolf (Politiker, 1879)
- Ferdinand von Wolff, de:Ferdinand von Wolff (Mineraloge)
- Reinhold Wulle

== Z ==
- Ernst Ziehm
- Friedrich Karl von Zitzewitz-Muttrin, de:Friedrich Karl von Zitzewitz-Muttrin
- Leo von Zumbusch
