= Albert Hackelsberger =

German businessman and politician (1893–1940)

Reichstag Deputy
- In office 12 November 1933 – 8 December 1938

Reichstag Deputy
- In office 31 July 1932 – 12 November 1933

Personal details
- Born: 17 October 1893 Bad Poikam, Kingdom of Bavaria, German Empire
- Died: 25 September 1940 (aged 46) Freiburg im Breisgau, Nazi Germany
- Party: Centre Party
- Other political affiliations: German People's Party
- Education: Doctor of Law
- Alma mater: University of Freiburg; Heidelberg University; University of Würzburg
- Occupation: Businessman
- Profession: Lawyer
- Civilian awards: Knight of the Order of St. Gregory the Great

Military service
- Allegiance: German Empire
- Branch/service: Imperial German Army
- Years of service: 1914–1919
- Rank: Rittmeister
- Unit: Dragoon Regiment 22 (3rd Baden)
- Commands: Baden Western Border Guard
- Battles/wars: World War I
- Military awards: Iron Cross, 1st and 2nd class Royal House Order of Hohenzollern; Military Karl-Friedrich Merit Order; Order of the Zähringer Lion; Military Merit Cross (Austria-Hungary); Wound Badge

Albert Hackelsberger (17 October 1893 – 25 September 1940) was a German businessman and politician during the Weimar Republic and Nazi Germany. He sat as a deputy in the Reichstag for the German Center Party and, after its dissolution, as a "guest" of the Nazi faction in the Greater German Reichstag. His commitment to the Catholic Church and his support for a Jesuit college engendered the hostility of the Nazi regime. Arrested by the Gestapo in September 1938, he died two years later in unclear circumstances while still in custody.

== Early years, war service and education ==
Hackelsberger was born into a Catholic family, the son of a landowner who was the Bürgermeister in Bad Poikam (today, part of Bad Abbach. He attended the Albertus-Magnus-Gymnasium Regensburg from 1904 and the Ludwigsgymnasium München from 1910 to 1914, where he earned his Abitur. On the outbreak of the First World War, he joined Dragoon Regiment 22 (3rd Baden) "Prinz Karl", headquartered in Mülhausen (today, Mulhouse), serving from 1914 to 1918 and attaining the rank of Leutnant in 1915. He fought on both the western and the eastern fronts, was wounded three times and was awarded for gallantry with the Iron Cross, 1st and 2nd class and several other decorations.

During the German Revolution of 1918–1919, Hackelsberger was elected chairman of the soldiers' council in Lörrach in November 1918. He briefly took command of the western border guard of the recently established Republic of Baden but soon retired from the military with the rank of Rittmeister.

In 1920, Hackelsberger began studying economics at the University of Freiburg, transferring in 1921 to Heidelberg University. He then studied law at Freiburg, Heidelberg and the University of Würzburg. At the same time, from 1922 to 1925, he completed training in banking and business administration. In 1923, he received a Ph.D in political science from Heidelberg and, in 1925, a Doctor of Law degree from Würzburg. He then passed the state law examination.

== Business career ==
Hacksberger married Helene van Eyck in 1920 and joined her family's firm, Weck Jar company in Wehr, in 1922. In 1926, two years after the retirement of his father-in-law, Georg van Eyck, he became general director of the company and retained this position until 1938. He was also the president of the Upper Baden Chamber of Commerce and a state labor court judge (Landesarbeitsrichter). In addition to managing his company, Hackelsberger was a member of multiple other corporate boards and agencies, including the following:

- Baden-Westphalian Committee of the Deutsche Bank
- Deutsche Reichsbahn
- Economic Advisory Council of the Reich Government
- Generalrat der Wirtschaft (General Council of the German Economy)
- German-Swiss Chamber of Commerce (Zurich)
- International Chamber of Commerce (Paris)
- Reichsverband der Deutschen Industrie (Reich Federation of German Industry)
- Reich Federation of the German Metal Goods Industry
- Southwest German Industrial Association

== Political activity ==
A member of the German People's Party from 1920, Hackelsberger switched to the Catholic-oriented Center Party in 1931, following his father-in-law who was a Centre Party politician. In the July 1932 German federal election, Hackelsberger was elected as a deputy to the Reichstag as the Center Party candidate for constituency 32 (Baden). In the elections of November 1932 and March 1933, Hackelsberger's mandate as a Center Party deputy was reaffirmed.

Following the Nazi seizure of power, in early 1933 Hackelsberger was elected as one of the two deputy chairmen of the Center Party. In March 1933, he was one of three representatives, along with the party chairman Ludwig Kaas and the other deputy chairman, Adam Stegerwald, who negotiated with Reich Chancellor Adolf Hitler the conditions for the Center Party's approval of the Enabling Act. He justified his support of Hitler with the view that he was the lesser evil, one that needed to be supported to avert greater dangers: "Hitler is Kerensky. More than one Lenin lurks behind the scenes."

From 7–14 June 1933, Hackelsberger was in Rome where he served as a go-between during the negotiations for the Reichskonkordat between Germany and the Holy See. Kaas, an ordained priest now working for the Vatican, conveyed the Church's wishes regarding the wording of the article on the de-politicization of the German clergy, through Hackelsberger, to Franz von Papen, the chief German negotiator. Hackelsberger, on his return to Germany, was also charged with the delivery of the text of the draft Concordat to Heinrich Brüning, a former chancellor who had replaced Kaas as the Centre Party chairman on 6 May.

Following the dissolution of the Centre Party in July 1933, Hackelsberger became the liaison between the Nazi Party and the former Center Party parliamentary deputies. He was reelected at the November 1933 election and continued to serve in the Reichstag until December 1938 as a "guest" of the Nazi faction. Oskar Farny was the only other Centre Party deputy to follow this path. Brüning later accused Hackelsberger of having pushed both for the adoption of the Enabling Act by the Centre Party deputies and for the party's dissolution.

In 1934, Hackelsberger was commissioned by the Baden state government to broker the sale of the vacant Saint Blaise Abbey in Sankt Blasien. Hackelsberger advocated making the buildings available to the Jesuits of the Stella Matutina in Feldkirch, Austria for use as a boarding school. This had arisen because the Nazi government had closed the Reich's borders to children of compulsory school age and blocked the flow of foreign currency to Austria in order to thwart Jesuit teaching at the college. Hackelsberger's significant participation in the founding of the Kolleg St. Blasien boarding school was an affront to the Nazi regime and was a causal factor for his later imprisonment.

== Arrest and death ==
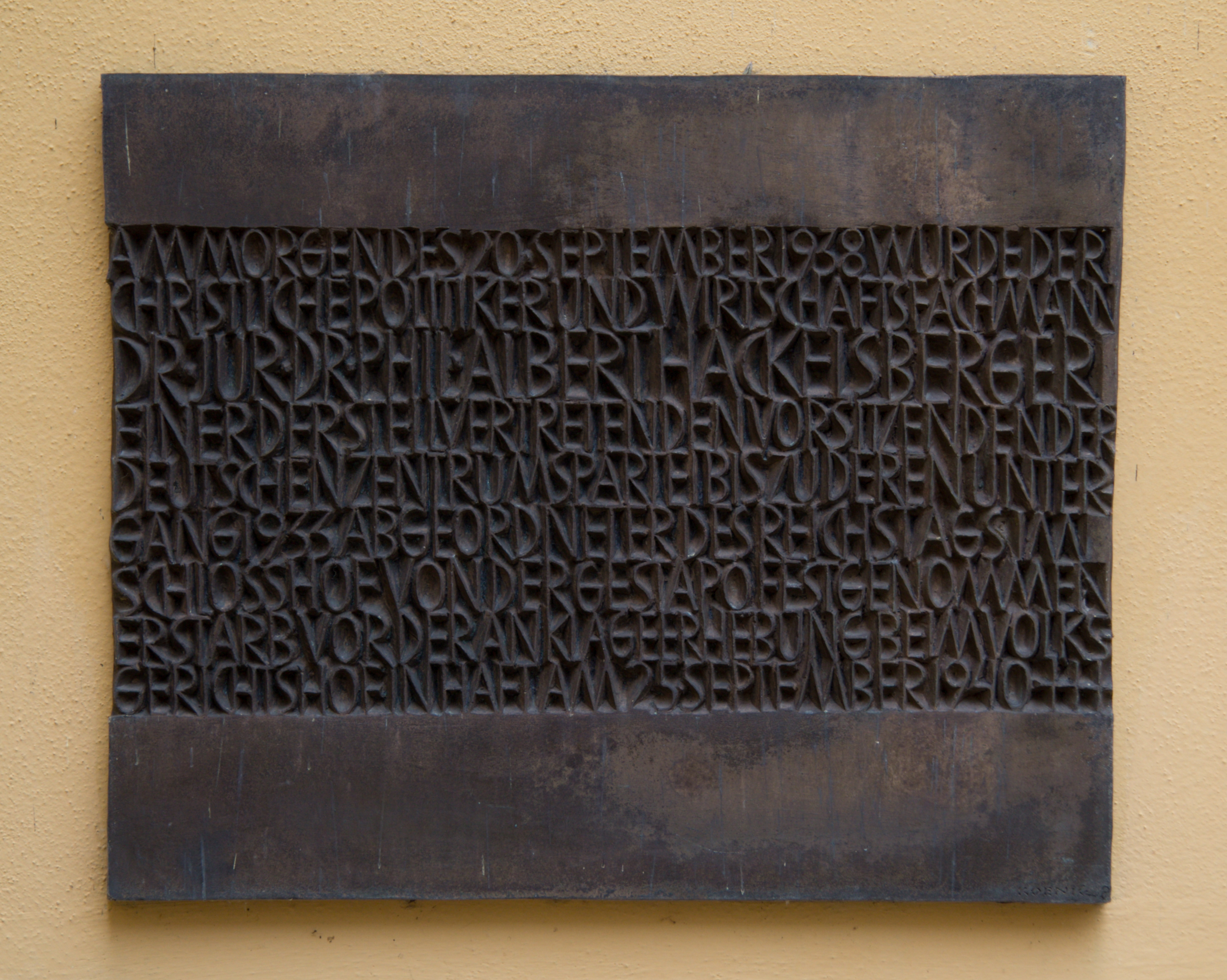
The memorial plaque to Hackelsberger in the Evangelische Akademie Tutzing

Hackelsberger's involvement with the Jesuits, his ardent Catholicism, his acceptance of a knighthood of the Order of St. Gregory the Great and his cross-border travels to France and Switzerland all made him suspect in the eyes of the Nazi regime, and he was deemed politically "unreliable". On 21 September 1938, Hackelsberger was arrested by the Gestapo at Tutzing Castle (today, Evangelische Akademie Tutzing) near Tutzing on Lake Starnberg, which he had acquired two years earlier as a summer residence. He was incarcerated in Freiburg prison and accused of currency offenses, but no formal charges were issued and he was never brought to trial. On 8 December 1938, his mandate in the Reichstag was revoked. The Nazi government closed down St. Blasien College in March 1939 "because the conditions under which the permit was granted could no longer be considered to be met".

In August 1940, after two years in solitary confinement and numerous Gestapo interrogations, Hackelsberger fell ill and was taken to a Freiburg clinic. Six weeks later, he died, allegedly from the effects of the prison conditions combined with an illness from the First World War. However, his cause of death remains unclear. Edmund Forschbach, another Catholic supporter who turned against the regime, claimed that Hackelsberger was killed in the Freiburg prison. Today, a memorial plaque in the courtyard of Tutzing Castle commemorates Hackelsberger.

== Sources ==
- Forschbach, Edmund (1984). Edgar J. Jung. Ein konservativer Revolutionär. 30. Juni 1934. Pfullingen: Neske Verlag. ISBN 978-3-788-50267-6.
- Ulrike Haerendel: Albert Hackelsberger – Schlossbesitzer und NS-Opfer. Vortrag gehalten aus Anlass des 80. Todestags von Dr. phil. Dr. jur. Albert Hackelsberger am 25. September 2020 in der Evangelischen Akademie Tutzing pdf
- Hackelsberger, Albert in the Akten der Reichskanzlei. Weimarer Republik
- Information about Albert Hackelsberger in the Reichstag database
- Morsey, Rudolf (1989). "Zentrumspartei und Zentrumpolitiker im rückblickenden Urteil Heinrich Brünings". In Heideking, Jürgen; Hufnagel, Gerhard; Knipping, Franz (eds.). Wege in die Zeitgeschichte Festschrift zum 65. Geburtstag von Gerhard Schulz. Berlin: Walter de Gruyter. ISBN 978-3-110-11738-7.
- Plum, Günter (1972). Gesellschaftsstruktur und politisches Bewusstsein in einer katholischen Region 1928-1933: Untersuchung am Beispiel des Regierungsbezirks Aachen. Mainz: Deutsche Verlags-Anstalt. ISBN 978-3-421-01586-0.
- Schumacher, Martin (1991). M.d.R., die Reichstagsabgeordneten der Weimarer Republik in der Zeit des Nationalsozialismus: Politische Verfolgung, Emigration und Ausbürgerung 1933–1945. Düsseldorf: Droste Verlag. ISBN 978-3-770-05162-5.
- Volk, Ludwig (1972). Das Reichskonkordat vom 20. Juli 1933. Mainz: Matthias-Grünewald-Verlag. ISBN 978-3-786-70383-9.
