= Principles of the German National People's Party =

1920 political manifesto of the German National People's Party

The Principles of the German National People's Party (German: Grundsätze der Deutschnationalen Volkspartei), commonly referred to as the 1920 party program or party principles, was the founding policy manifesto of the German National People's Party (DNVP), a national-conservative and monarchist political party of the Weimar Republic with a substantial antisemitic and völkisch current.

The program is antisemitic, monarchist, and explicitly revisionist of the Treaty of Versailles, and reflects the DNVP's identity from its founding as a coalition of conservative, monarchist, völkisch, and antisemitic elements.

== Background ==
The DNVP was formed in December 1918, shortly after Germany's defeat in the First World War and the collapse of the German Empire, through the merger of several right-wing and conservative parties, including the antisemitic Christian Social Party. Reflecting a strong antisemitic orientation from the outset, Jews were formally barred from joining the DNVP. The party rejected the legitimacy of the republican government established in the German Empire's place, and spent most of its existence in opposition to it.

The party published its programmatic principles in 1920, the same year the DNVP lent tacit support to the attempted Kapp–Lüttwitz Putsch against the republican government.

Historian Larry Eugene Jones has characterized the DNVP's broader program of the period as combining "deeply ingrained anti-Catholic sentiments" with an antisemitism that ran through the party's cultural and educational policy as well as its politics.

== Historical significance ==
The 1920 program's antisemitism was not incidental to the document but was consistent with the party's character from its founding. Historian Lewis Hertzman recorded that the DNVP banned Jews from party membership from its earliest days, and that the party's 1919 election material for the National Assembly included a pamphlet titled "The Jews—Germany's vampires!" The task of drafting the party's founding platform had fallen to a committee headed by Ulrich von Hassell. The Israeli historian Yehuda Bauer later described the DNVP as "the party of the traditional, often radical anti-Semitic elites."

Historians situate the program within the DNVP's broader identity as an alliance of monarchist, völkisch, and antisemitic currents on the German right. The Routledge Companion to Fascism and the Far Right characterizes the party the program founded as proto-fascist in orientation.

== See also ==
- List of German National People's Party politicians
