= Guests of the Nazi Party faction in the Reichstag =

Non-Nazis in the Nazi Reichstag

Guests of the Nazi Party faction in the Reichstag were deputies of the Reichstag of Nazi Germany who were not officially members of the Nazi Party. They sat in the German parliament throughout the years of Nazi rule (1933–1945). They originally numbered 22 members but diminished to 7 by the time of Germany's surrender in the Second World War.

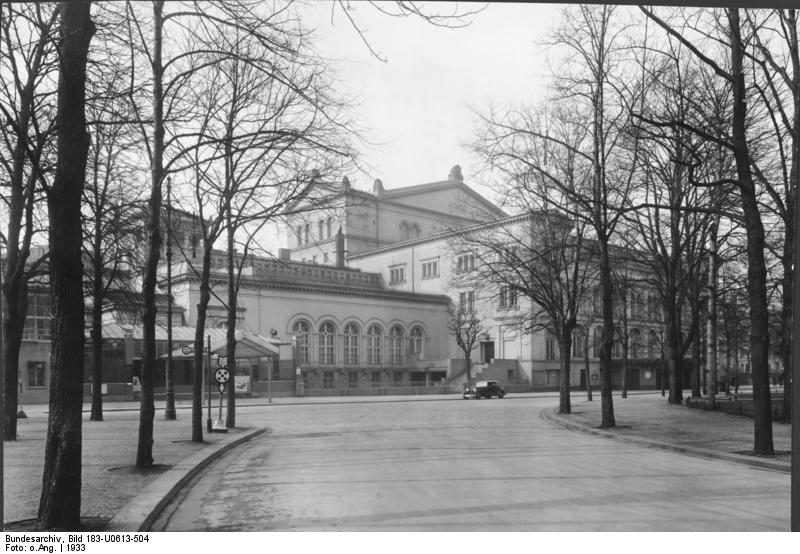
The Kroll Opera House (1933) where the Reichstag sessions were held from March 1933 to April 1942

== Background ==
After the Nazi seizure of power in January 1933, Adolf Hitler moved swiftly to consolidate power by passing a series of laws in the process known as Gleichschaltung. One of these measures was the Law Against the Formation of Parties (14 July 1933) which established the Nazi Party (NSDAP) as the sole legal political entity. As a result, in all subsequent Reichstag terms, the only parliamentary faction allowed was that of the NSDAP, elected from a single Nazi electoral list. To placate traditional conservatives, a small number of Reichstag deputies who did not formally belong to the Nazi Party, but nonetheless were Nazi supporters, were included on the list as "guests" (German: Gäste) of the NSDAP faction.

== Numbers ==
At the first parliamentary election after the consolidation of power (12 November 1933), 22 of 661 deputies were elected as guests of the Nazi Party faction. Four of the guest deputies eventually joined the Nazi Party. In addition, the combination of deaths, expulsions, retirements and electoral defeats reduced the number to 19 of 741 at the following election on 29 March 1936 and to only 11 of 814 at the election of 10 April 1938. A total of only 7 remained in office as guest deputies at the fall of the Nazi regime on 8 May 1945.

== Characteristics ==
A majority of the guest deputies were former members of the German National People's Party, a conservative, nationalist and antisemitic party that had joined in a coalition government with the Nazis in January 1933 but which, under pressure from the Nazis, dissolved itself on 27 June. Other individuals had belonged to different mainstream parties of the Weimar Republic, such as the Bavarian People's Party, the Centre Party and the German People's Party, all which likewise had been disbanded. Many of the guest deputies were industrialists and financiers who had backed the Nazi Party in its rise to power. Almost half were lawyers and a number came from aristocratic families. Two-thirds previously had sat in the Reichstag as representatives of their former political affiliations. Two (Hugenberg and Papen) were original members of Hitler's cabinet.

== Table of guests of the Nazi Party faction ==
Guest Deputy	Nazi Party Deputy

Name	Former Political; Affiliations	Previous; Reichstag; Deputy	12 November 1933; Election	29 March 1936; Election	10 April 1938; Election	Notes
Paul Bang	DNVP; Pan-German League	X	X	X	X	
Heinrich Claß	Pan-German League		X	X	X	
Friedrich Everling	DNVP	X	X	X	X	
Oskar Farny	Centre Party	X	X	X	X	
Otto von Feldmann	DNVP; Pan-German League		X	X		Did not seek reelection in 1938.
Edmund Forschbach	DNVP		X			Expelled on 10 July 1934.
Axel von Freytagh-Loringhoven	DNVP	X	X	X	X	Died on 28 October 1942.
Carl Gottfried Gok	DNVP	X	X			Not reelected in 1936.
Friedrich Grimm	DVP		X	X	X	Joined the Nazi Party on 1 May 1933.
Albert Hackelsberger	Centre Party	X	X	X	X	Expelled on 8 December 1938. Died on 25 September 1940.
Alfred Hugenberg	DNVP	X	X	X	X	
Fritz Kleiner	DNVP	X	X	X		Not reelected in 1938.
Hans Louis Ferdinand von Löwenstein zu Löwenstein	DNVP		X	X		Did not seek reelection in 1938.
Franz von Papen	Centre Party; DNVP	X	X	X	X	Joined the Nazi Party on 13 March 1938.
Eugen Graf von Quadt zu Wykradt und Isny	BVP	X	X	X	X	Joined the Nazi Party on 1 May 1937. Died on 19 October 1940.
Franz Schenk Freiherr von Stauffenberg	DNVP; Bauern- und Weingärtnerbund	X	X	X	X	
Hermann Schmitz	Nonpartisan		X	X	X	
Karl Friedrich Freiherr von Schorlemer	DNVP	X	X	X		Died on 27 September 1936
Fritz Springorum	DNVP		X	X	X	Joined the Nazi Party on 1 May 1937. Died on 16 April 1942.
Emil Georg von Stauss	DVP	X	X	X	X	Died on 11 December 1942
Lothar Steuer	DNVP		X	X		Did not seek reelection in 1938.
Albert Vögler	DVP	X	X	X	X	Died on 14 April 1945

== Post-war prosecutions ==
By the time of Nazi Germany's capitulation in May 1945, 7 of the individuals who had served as guest deputies were dead (Freytagh-Loringhoven, Hackelsberger, Quadt zu Wykradt und Isny, Schorlemer, Springorum, Stauss and Vögler). Captured by the Russians, Bang died in December 1945. Most of the surviving fourteen deputies were arrested, underwent denazification proceedings and were released. Among the most prominent members, Hitler's vice-chancellor Papen was tried and acquitted in October 1946 at the Nuremberg trial of the major Nazi war criminals. However, at his denazification trial in February 1947, Papen was sentenced to 8 years in a labor camp as a "major offender" but was released in January 1949. The industrialist Schmitz was found guilty of the war crimes of plundering and spoliation in July 1948 by a US military tribunal at the IG Farben Trial in Nuremberg and sentenced to 4 years imprisonment but, in consideration of time served, was released after eight months. The former chairman of the DNVP, Hugenberg, was arrested by British forces in September 1946. At his denazification hearing in Lemgo, Hugenberg was first judged to be a "lesser offender" in July 1947 but this was reduced on appeal in Detmold to "follower" on 18 July 1949 and, on further appeal, to "exonerated" with full return of his assets.

== See also ==
- List of Reichstag deputies in the Third Reich (1st electoral term)
- List of Reichstag deputies in the Third Reich (2nd electoral term)
- List of Reichstag deputies in the Third Reich (3rd electoral term)
- List of Reichstag deputies in the Third Reich (4th electoral term)
