= Eugen Graf von Quadt zu Wykradt und Isny =

German military officer and politician (1887–1940)

Bavarian Minister for Economic Affairs
- In office 25 April 1933 – 27 June 1933
- Minister-president: Ludwig Siebert

Bavarian Plenipotentiary to the Reichsrat
- In office April 1933 – 14 February 1934

Reichstag Deputy
- In office 14 September 1930 – 19 October 1940

Personal details
- Born: Eugen Franziskus de Paula Joseph Maria Alban Kaspar von Quadt zu Wykradt und Isny; 6 January 1887 Isny im Allgäu, Kingdom of Württemberg, German Empire
- Died: 19 October 1940 (aged 53) Isny im Allgäu, Nazi Germany
- Party: Bavarian People's Party; Nazi Party
- Occupation: Military officer Business executive
- Awards: Knight of the Sovereign Military Order of Malta

Military service
- Allegiance: German Empire
- Branch/service: Royal Bavarian Army
- Years of service: 1907–1918
- Rank: Rittmeister
- Unit: 1st Heavy Cavalry Regiment; 2nd Heavy Cavalry Regiment
- Battles/wars: World War I

Eugen Franziskus de Paula Joseph Maria Alban Kaspar Graf von Quadt zu Wykradt und Isny (6 January 1887 – 19 October 1940) was a German nobleman, professional army officer, business executive and politician. A member of the Reichstag from 1930 until his death, he first represented the conservative Bavarian People's Party (BVP). He became a supporter of Adolf Hitler and, following the Nazi seizure of power at the end of January 1933, he briefly served as the Minister of Economics in Bavaria from April to June of that year and also was appointed as a Bavarian plenipotentiary to the Reichsrat. After the dissolution of the BVP in June 1933, he became a "guest" of the Nazi Party faction in the Reichstag, and formally joined the Party on 1 May 1937. He also became a member of the Allgemeine SS, attaining the rank of SS-Hauptsturmführer in September 1938.

== Family ==
Quadt was a member of an old German noble family and was born in Isny im Allgäu, then in the Kingdom of Württemberg, the son of Bertram Graf von Quadt zu Wykradt und Isny (1849–1927) who was a member of the First Chamber of the Estates of Württemberg and later a prince of Bavaria who served in its House of Councillors. Quadt married Pauline, Countess of Königsegg-Aulendorf (1885–1961) on 21 September 1909 in Munich. The couple had a daughter, Ludovika (1910–1986), and a son, Karl Erwin (1916–1975).

== Early life and war service ==
After attending a humanistic Gymnasium, Quadt entered the Royal Bavarian Army in 1907 to pursue a career as a professional military officer. From 1908, he served as the regimental adjutant in the 1st Royal Bavarian Heavy Cavalry (Prince Charles of Bavaria's). In 1913 and 1914, he was assigned to the Bavarian embassy in Berlin. During the First World War, Quadt first served as a squadron commander in the 2nd Royal Bavarian Heavy Cavalry "Archduke Francis Ferdinand of Austria". He later moved into staff postings in the senior adjutant's office of the high command of the 6th Army, the Army Group Rupprecht and the Army Group Mackensen. At the end of the war, he was discharged from the military with the rank of Rittmeister.

== Life under the Weimar Republic ==
Quadt entered the business world and became a member of the Vorstand (board of directors) of a Munich industrial company until 1924. As an aristocrat and a former military officer, he was a supporter and a member of the conservative Bavarian People's Party (BVP). At the parliamentary election of September 1930, he was elected as a deputy to the Reichstag from the BVP electoral list. Quadt had contacts within the Bavarian Nazi Party leadership and enthusiastically supported Adolf Hitler's political goals. Quadt was considered the "grey eminence" of Bavarian business life and, after the Nazi seizure of power, he was appointed the Bavarian State Minister for Economic Affairs in the cabinet of Minister-president Ludwig Siebert on 25 April 1933. He was the only minister who did not belong to the Nazi Party. On 27 June 1933 when other BVP officials began to be arrested, he resigned his post and was replaced by a Nazi. When the Nazis began to further consolidate their power and moved to disband opposition parties, Quadt was appointed the BVP commissioner for the dissolution of the party. He coordinated the 4 July 1933 declaration to dissolve the BVP with party chairman Fritz Schäffer, who was imprisoned in Munich's Stadelheim prison at the time, and he issued a call for BVP members to switch their allegiance to the Nazi Party. He also served as a Bavarian plenipotentiary to the Reichsrat until its abolition by the Nazis on 14 February 1934.

== Career in Nazi Germany ==
Quadt joined the Nazi faction in the Reichstag as a "guest" and remained a member of the Reichstag until his death, representing electoral constituency 31 (Württemberg) from the election of November 1933 forward. Throughout this period, he also served as one of the Reichstag's twelve Schriftführer (secretaries). In 1934, Quadt became a member of the Nazi paramilitary Sturmabteilung (SA), with the rank of Rottenführer. On 12 October 1935, he joined the Allgemeine SS (SS number 274,757) with the rank of SS-Untersturmführer. He was promoted to SS-Obersturmführer on 20 April 1937 and to SS-Hauptsturmführer on 11 September 1938. On 1 May 1937, he formally joined the Nazi Party (membership number 5,354,017). Quadt died on 19 October 1940.

== Sources ==
- Information about Eugen Graf von Quadt zu Wykradt und Isny in the Reichstag database
- Lilla, Joachim: Quadt zu Wykradt und Isny, Eugen Graf v. , in: Staatsminister, leitende Verwaltungsbeamte und (NS-)Funktionsträger in Bayern 1918 bis 1945.
- Raborg, Frank: Eugen Graf von Wykradt und Isny in the Deutsche Biographie.
- Stockhorst, Erich (1985). 5000 Köpfe: Wer War Was im 3. Reich. Arndt. ISBN 978-3-887-41116-9.
