= Oskar Farny =

German businessman and politician (1891–1983)

Minister for Federal Affairs Baden-Württemberg
- In office 7 October 1953 – 23 June 1960

Bundestag Deputy
- In office 6 September 1953 – 11 November 1953

Reichstag Deputy
- In office 12 November 1933 – 8 May 1945

Reichstag Deputy
- In office 14 September 1930 – 26 June 1933

Landtag of Württemberg Deputy
- In office 6 June 1920 – 23 March 1921

Personal details
- Born: 4 September 1891 Dürren, Kingdom of Württemberg, German Empire
- Died: 20 June 1983 (aged 91) Wangen im Allgäu, Baden-Württemberg, West Germany
- Party: Christian Democratic Union
- Other political affiliations: Centre Party; Christian Social Union
- Education: University of Tübingen
- Occupation: Business owner
- Civilian awards: Cross of Merit of the Order of Merit of the Federal Republic of Germany; Order of Merit of Baden-Württemberg
- Nickname: King of the Allgäu

Military service
- Allegiance: German Empire; Nazi Germany
- Branch/service: Imperial German Army; German Army
- Years of service: 1910–1911; 1913–1919; 1939–1945
- Rank: Hauptmann; Oberstleutnant
- Unit: Grenadier Regiment 123 (5th Württemberg); Infantry Regiment 124 (6th Württemberg); Infantry Division 27; Infantry Regiment 290
- Battles/wars: World War I World War II
- Military awards: Iron Cross, 1st and 2nd class Clasp to the Iron Cross, 2nd class Military Merit Order (Württemberg); Military Merit Order (Bavaria); War Merit Cross, 2nd class

Oskar Farny (9 April 1891 – 20 June 1983) was a German military officer, businessman and politician. Serving as an officer in the Imperial German Army from 1913, he left the army after the First World War. In 1919, he took over management of his family's business, the Edelweiß Brewery Farny, and also became chairman of the board of a cheese-making cooperative.

Farny also was active in politics and served briefly in the Württemberg Landtag, the state parliament. From September 1930 to June 1933, he was a member of the Reichstag of the Weimar Republic as a representative of the Centre Party, and from November 1933 until May 1945, he was a "guest" of the Nazi Party faction in the Reichstag, though he never officially joined the Nazi Party. Returning to the military in 1939, he spent most of the Second World War as an Oberstleutnant of reserves on the home front.

After the end of the war, Farny was elected to the West German Bundestag in 1953 for the conservative Christian Democratic Union (CDU). He was appointed Minister for Federal Affairs in the Baden-Württemberg state ministry, serving as the state's representative to the federal government until 1960. He also continued to be active as a business executive.

== Early life and military service ==
Farny was born at the family estate in Dürren (today, part of Kißlegg) in 1891, the second of eight children of a local brewery owner. He attended the local Gymnasium in Ravensburg and obtaining his Abitur. To fulfill his compulsory military duty, Farny enlisted in the 123rd (5th Württemberg) Grenadier Regiment "King Charles" in 1910 as a one-year volunteer. He then studied law at the University of Tübingen from 1911 to 1913. During his university years, he was a German Student Corps member of the academic fraternity AV Guestfalia Tübingen.

Setting out on a military career, he was commissioned in 1913 as a Leutnant in Infantry Regiment 124 (6th Württemberg) "King William I", headquartered in Weingarten. During the First World War, Farny served as a platoon and company commander and as a battalion adjutant. In 1918, he was a general staff officer candidate in the 27th Infantry Division. He was awarded both classes of the Iron Cross, and the Military Merit Order of both Württemberg and Bavaria. Due to the reduction in the size of the new peacetime Reichswehr required by the Treaty of Versailles, he left military service in 1919 with the rank of Hauptmann.

After his older brother, Hugo Farny, renounced his inheiritance to become a pastor, Oskar became the heir to his parents' estate and owner of the Edelweiß Brewery Farny in Dürren. Also in 1919, Farny took over the chairmanship of the Vorstand (executive board) of Vereinigte Käsereien Dürren, a dairy and cheese-making cooperative (from which today's Allgäuland-Käsereien developed) and he remained its director until 1976.

== Career in the Weimar Republic and Nazi Germany ==
After the establishment of the Weimar Republic, Farny was elected in 1919 to the municipal council of Waltershofen (today, part of Kißlegg), where he served until 1972. In 1920, he joined the Centre Party and, in June of that year, was elected to the Landtag of the Free People's State of Württemberg, where he only served until resigning in March 1921. In September 1930, Farny was elected to the Reichstag from electoral constituency 31 (Württemberg). With other members of the Centre Party, he voted on 23 March 1933 for the Enabling Act, which secured the rule of the Nazi Party. He resigned his seat on 26 June, just before the Centre Party voted to dissolve itself. He was again elected on 12 November 1933 to the Reichstag, this time as a "guest" of the Nazi Party faction. He remained a member throughout Nazi Germany and was among those who voted to approve the Nuremberg Laws in September 1935. From 1933 to 1945, he was head of the dairy industry section and head of the Reich Trade Association for Processed Cheese Manufacturers in the Reichsnährstand. He was also a member of the administrative board of the German Dairy Industry until he was dismissed in 1937.

During the Second World War, Farny served as a Wehrmacht battalion commander in the 290th Infantry Regiment on the western front from 1939 to 1940 and was awarded the Clasp to the Iron Cross, 2nd class. From 1941 to 1945, he served as chief of staff to the commander for prisoner of war affairs in Wehrkreis (military district) V, headquartered in Stuttgart. In 1942, he was promoted to Oberstleutnant of reserves. He was also awarded the War Merit Cross, 2nd class.

== Friendship and last meeting with Rommel ==
Farny had met Erwin Rommel when they were both young junior officers with Infantry Regiment 124 in Weingarten before the First World War, and they became lifelong friends. Following the failed 20 July plot on Adolf Hitler's life, Rommel, now a Generalfeldmarschall with foreknowledge of the plot, visited with his old friend at Ulm on 13 October 1944. Rommel confided in Farny that he expected Hitler was going to have him killed. Farny also had contacts among the conspirators, some of whom had already been arrested. He said that he too expected to be arrested and feared for his life, however, he protested that Rommel was far too famous and popular to be thus threatened. Yet the following day, Rommel was visited by two generals from Hitler's headquarters, confronted with his complicity in the plot and coerced into a forced suicide to prevent reprisals against his family. Farny was never implicated or arrested.

== Post-war life ==
After the end of the war, Farny underwent denazification proceedings and was placed in Category V, "exonerated". He served as the vice president of the Central Food Committee in the French occupation zone. Although he lived in Württemberg-Hohenzollern, he initially joined the Christian Social Union in Bavaria (CSU). Switching to the Christian Democratic Union (CDU), Farny was elected as a deputy of the German Bundestag at the 6 September 1953 federal election. On 7 October 1953, he was appointed minister for federal affairs of the state of Baden-Württemberg. He served as one of the state's representatives to the federal government in the Bundesrat, subsequently resigning his Bundestag mandate on 11 November. When Minister-President Gebhard Müller was elected president of the Federal Constitutional Court in 1958, he favored Farny as his successor; however, the party elected Kurt Georg Kiesinger instead. Farny continued to hold his posts in the Kiesinger cabinet until 23 June 1960.

Also continuing his commercial career, in 1954 Farny became president of the Association of the German Dairy Industry. From 1958 to 1967, he was chairman of the University of Hohenheim Association. From 1954 to 1969, he was the president of the Württemberg state association of Deutscher Raiffeisenverband, the umbrella organization of the German agriculture and food industries. In 1961, he became a member of its national executive board, later becoming its president. For his substantial influence in the economic and political life of Württemberg, Farny was given the nickname of "King of the Allgäu". Farny died at Wangen im Allgäu in June 1983.

== Honors ==
For his services to quality assurance research in the dairy industry, Farny was awarded an honorary doctorate from the Department of Agricultural Sciences at the University of Hohenheim in 1956. In 1960, he was awarded the Great Cross of Merit with Star and Sash of the Order of Merit of the Federal Republic of Germany and, in 1975, the Order of Merit of Baden-Württemberg.

== Sources ==
- Butler, Daniel Allen (2015). Field Marshal: the Life and Death of Erwin Rommel. Casemate Publishers. ISBN 978-1-612-00297-2.
- Information about Oskar Farny in the Reichstag database
- Oskar Farny Biografie in Entdecken Sie Baden-Württemberg (Discover Baden-Württemberg)
- Frank Raberg: Oskar Farny – der Allgäuer Januskopf. In: Kontext: Wochenzeitung, 15 April 2015.
