= Werner Meinhof =

German art historian

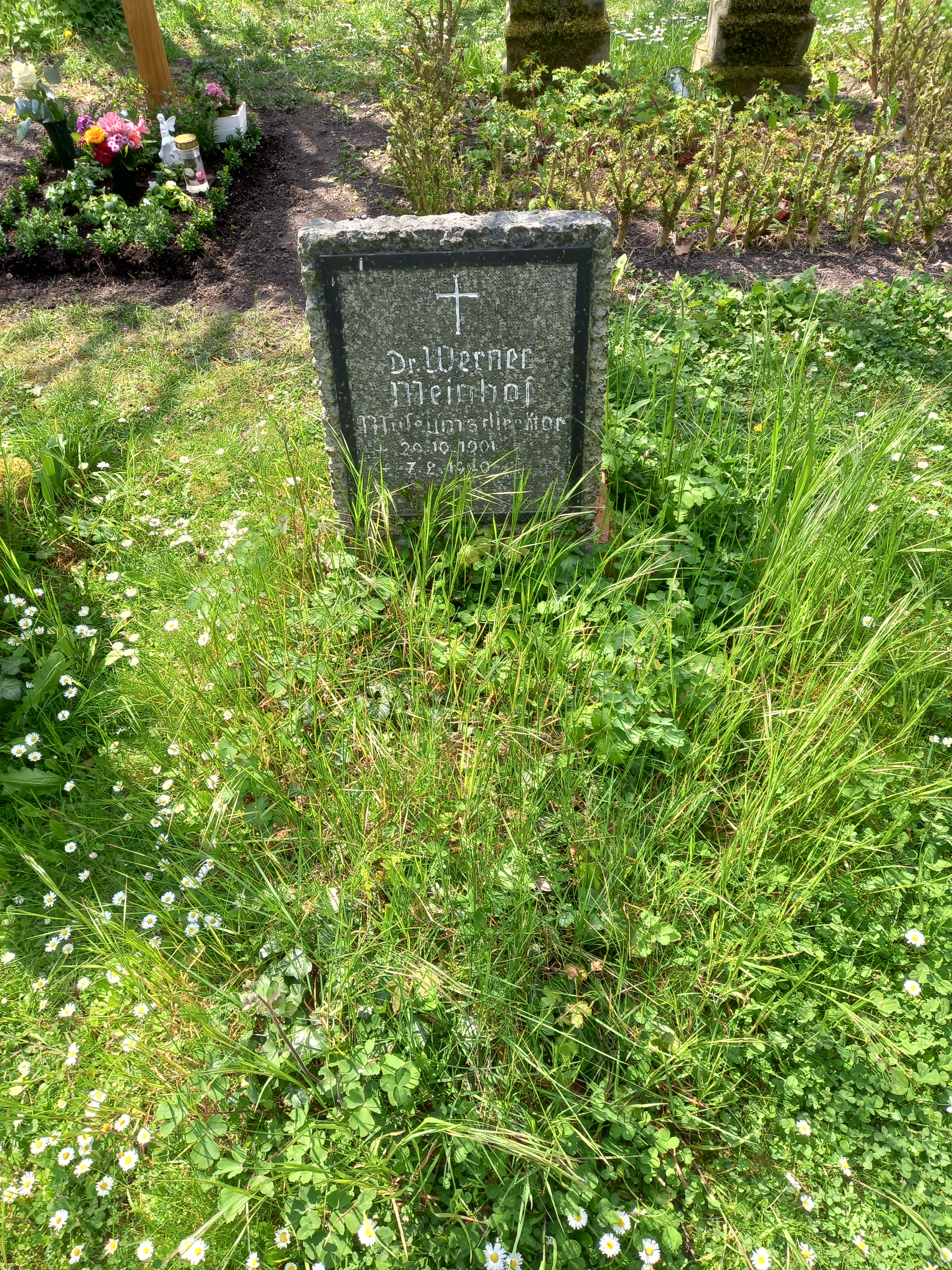

Werner Kurt Armin Meinhof (20 October 1901 – 7 February 1940) was a German art historian of the 20th century.

Meinhof was born in Halle an der Saale, the son of pastor Johannes Meinhof and brother of Africanist Carl Meinhof. He studied history of art in his hometown under Paul Frankl, where he got to know the painter Walter Timmling and the future art historian Hellmuth Allwill Fritzsche. After obtaining his doctorate, Werner Meinhof served from 1928 as a research assistant at the Oldenburg state museum, and in 1936 became director of the Göhre city museum in Jena.

Werner Meinhof married art historian Ingeborg Guthardt (died 1949) with whom he had two daughters, Wienke (born 1931) and Ulrike Meinhof (born 1934), future founding member of the Red Army Faction (RAF). Upon the early death of their parents, both were raised by the historian and peace activist Renate Riemeck.

In 1919 Meinhof joined the national-conservative German National People's Party (DNVP). He came into conflict with Joseph Goebbels in 1933 due to the publication of the essay Film, Kunst, Kitsch, Propaganda (Cinema, Art, Kitsch, Propaganda) by Walter Timmling and Hermann Ulrich in the Der Damm series issued by Werner Meinhof. Their description of propaganda was a "devil's work". However Ulrike Meinhof's biographer Jutta Ditfurth stated that Werner Meinhof had joined the Nazi Party by May 1933.
