= Franz Schenk Freiherr von Stauffenberg =

German nobleman and politician (1878–1950)

Reichstag Deputy
- In office 12 November 1933 – 8 May 1945

Reichstag Deputy
- In office 14 September 1930 – 5 March 1933

Reichstag Deputy
- In office 4 May 1924 – 20 May 1928

Chamber of Lords Hereditary Member Estates of Württemberg
- In office June 1901 – November 1918

Personal details
- Born: Franz Wilhelm Karl Maria Gabriel von Stauffenberg; 14 August 1878 Rißtissen, Kingdom of Württemberg, German Empire
- Died: 9 November 1950 (aged 72) Riedlingen, West Germany
- Party: German National People's Party
- Education: Ludwig-Maximilians-Universität München; Friedrich Wilhelm University of Berlin; Poppelsdorf Agricultural University; University of Hohenheim; University of Tübingen
- Occupation: Estate manager Business executive
- Civilian awards: Honorary doctorate, University of Hohenheim

Military service
- Allegiance: German Empire
- Branch/service: Royal Bavarian Army
- Years of service: 1914–1918
- Rank: Oberstleutnant
- Unit: 20th Royal Bavarian Infantry Regiment
- Battles/wars: World War I
- Military awards: Order of the Württemberg Crown

Franz Wilhelm Karl Maria Gabriel Schenk Freiherr von Stauffenberg (14 August 1878 – 9 November 1950) was a German nobleman, landowner, businessman, and politician. He belonged to the old Swabian noble family of Stauffenberg. He served in the Chamber of Lords, the upper legislative chamber of the Kingdom of Württemberg during the German Empire, and in the Reichstag during the Weimar Republic and Nazi Germany.

== Family ==
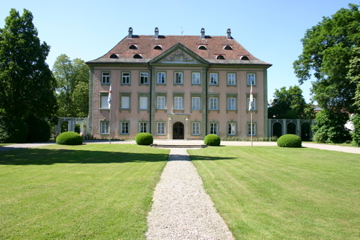
Stauffenberg Castle, in Rißtissen

Stauffenberg was born in Rißtissen, a section of Ehingen in Württemberg, the tenth and youngest child and the only surviving son of Freiherr Franz August Schenk von Stauffenberg (1834–1901) and Gräfin Ida von Geldern-Egmont (1837–1887). Franz was married on 27 May 1903 to Gräfin Huberta Berta Wolff-Metternich (1882–1952) with whom he had five children. He was a distant cousin to Claus von Stauffenberg (1907–1944), who in 1944 was a chief participant in the 20 July plot to assassinate Adolf Hitler.

== Early life and education ==
Stauffenberg attended the Gymnasium in Augsburg and the prestigious Wilhelmsgymnasium in Munich where he received his Abitur in 1896. From 1897, he studied at the Ludwig-Maximilians-Universität München, from 1898 at the Friedrich Wilhelm University of Berlin and from 1901 at the Poppelsdorf Agricultural University (today, part of the University of Bonn) and at the University of Hohenheim from which he would later receive an honorary doctorate. Between 1902 and 1903, he was also enrolled in forestry studies at the University of Tübingen. He managed his family estates from 1901 and was a member of the Württemberg Chamber of Agriculture.

== Service in the First World War ==
Stauffenberg took part in the First World War from 1914 to 1918, entering military service with the Royal Bavarian Army as a Leutnant in the reserves of the heavy cavalry. He was promoted to Rittmeister,became a battalion commander in the 20th Infantry Regiment "Prince Franz" and was severely wounded in March 1918. He was discharged with the rank of Oberstleutnant and was awarded the Order of the Württemberg Crown.

== Business and political career ==
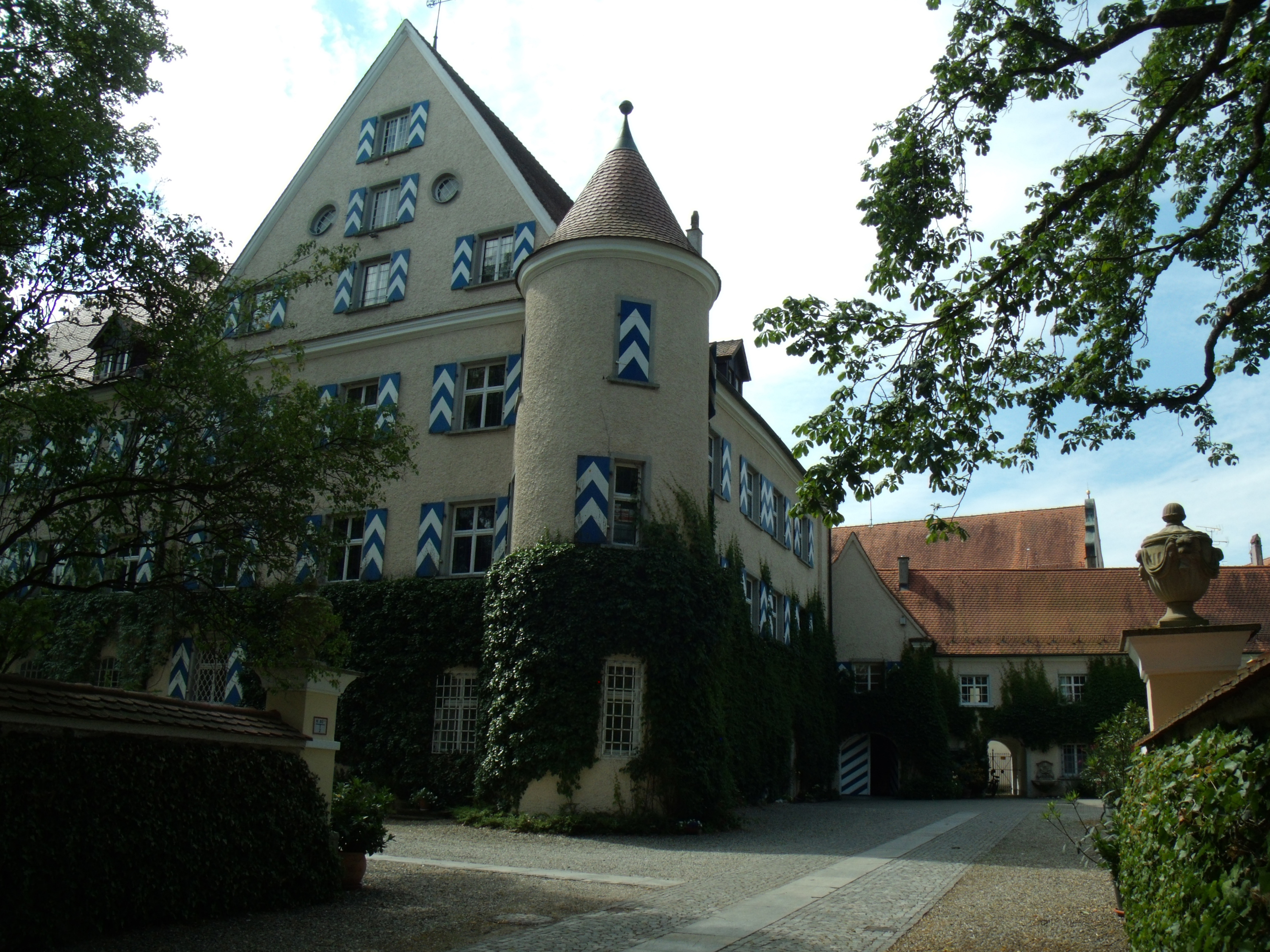
Stauffenberg's castle in Wilflingen

Returning to civilian life, Stauffenberg then lived primarily at his estate of Wilflingen in Langenenslingen. Turning to a career in business, he was the co-founder of Zweckverband Oberschwäbische Elektrizitätswerke (Upper Swabian Electricity Works) where he served as chairman of the board until 1935. He also was a co-founder of the Stuttgart Dairy and OMIRA (Overland Milk Processing Company) in Ravensburg in 1929.

Stauffenberg succeeded his father as a hereditary member of the upper Chamber of Lords of the Estates of Württemberg from 1901 until the overthrow of the Württemberg monarchy in 1918. During the Weimar Republic, he was elected as a deputy to the Reichstag at the May 1924 German federal election. He represented electoral constituency 31 (Württemberg) as a member of the conservative German National People's Party (DNVP). He was reelected in December 1924 and served until 1928. At the election of 14 September 1930, he was returned to the Reichstag as a candidate on the electoral list of the regional Württembergischer Bauern- und Weingärtnerbund (Württembergian Peasants and Winegrowers Association). He was reelected at the following two elections and served until March 1933. After the Nazi seizure of power and the banning of all other parties, Stauffenberg again was elected to the Reichstag at the November 1933 election from his former Württemberg constituency as a "guest" of the Nazi Party faction. He never joined the Nazi Party but retained his seat until the fall of the regime in May 1945. He died in Riedlingen in November 1950.

== Sources ==
- Information about Franz Schenk Freiherr von Stauffenberg in the Reichstag database
- Raberg, Frank (2002): Biographisches Handbuch Der Wurttembergischen Landtagsabgeordneten (1815-1933), Kohlhammer. ISBN 978-3-170-16604-2.
- Wunder, Gerd (1972): Die Schenken von Stauffenberg. Eine Familiengeschichte, Müller und Gräff, Stuttgart.
