= Paula Müller-Otfried =

German social reformer and politician (1865–1946)

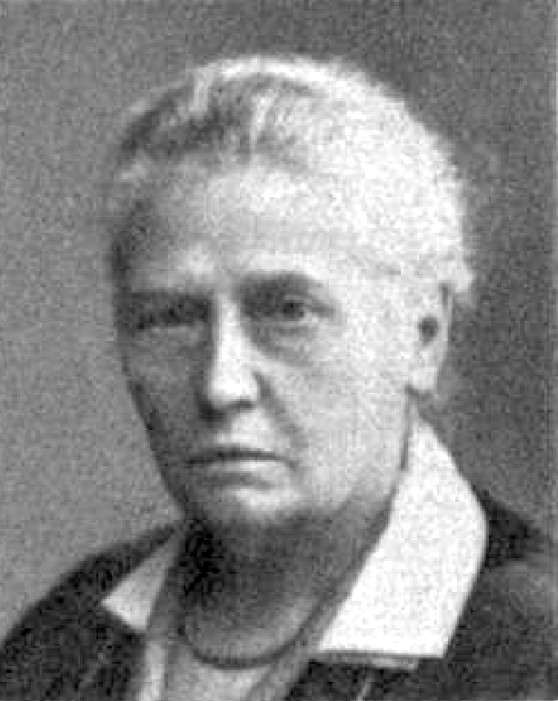
- Müller-Otfried c. 1932
- Born: Pauline Sophie Christiane Müller; 7 June 1865; Hoya, Kingdom of Hanover, German Confederation
- Died: 8 January 1946 (aged 80); Einbeck, British zone, Allied-occupied Germany
- Occupations: Politician, social reformer, women's rights activist
- Known for: Chairwoman of the German Evangelical Women's Association (DEF); Member of the Reichstag (1920–1932)
- Political party: DNVP
- Awards: Red Cross Medal (Prussia), War Merit Cross (Prussia), Honorary Doctorate in Theology (University of Göttingen, 1930)

Paula Müller-Otfried (born Pauline Sophie Christiane Müller; June 7, 1865 – January 8, 1946) was a German social reformer, politician, and leading figure in the Protestant women's movement. As long-time chairwoman of the German Evangelical Women's Association (DEF), she promoted Christian-based social work, women's vocational training, and moral reform. Initially an opponent of women's suffrage, she later served as a Reichstag member for the German National People's Party (DNVP) from 1920 to 1932, advocating for youth welfare and support for small pensioners. She was known for bridging conservative religious values with emerging roles for women in public life and was awarded an honorary doctorate in theology in 1930.

== Early life ==
Pauline Sophie Christiane Müller was born on June 7, 1865, in Hoya. Her father, Carl Hugo Müller (1830–1908), was a jurist who moved to Lüneburg as a senior court assessor. His wife, Emma Henriette Sophie née Bauer (1828–1891), followed with their two children. In 1869, the family moved to Hanover, where the father worked for 30 years as Second Finance Councillor in the administration, and from 1895 also as provincial director of Hanover. Pauline's grandfather was Karl Otfried Müller, founder of classical antiquities studies. The liberal professor from Göttingen maintained an open household promoting art and literature. Pauline's father continued this tradition in their Hanover home. Paula thus experienced a happy childhood in an intellectually stimulating environment. She attended the Evangelical-Lutheran Higher Girls’ School in Hanover, traveled to Greece and Italy, the world of her grandfather, and spent a year at a girls’ boarding school in Lausanne to improve her French. As a child, she came into contact with the hardships of the working class by often accompanying her mother on visits to the homes of the poor. Her father also conveyed to her the connections between economic development and the social problems of industrial society.

== Social work ==
As a child, Paula helped her mother in charitable work. From 1893, she became active in church-based poor relief and came into contact with the plight of prostitutes, which became a personal concern. Though initially hesitant about the women's movement and skeptical of its necessity, her growing engagement with the "women’s question" gradually shifted her perspective. She came to advocate for independent employment opportunities for women across social classes, seeking to improve their status within Wilhelmine society.

The realization has grown that, in our time, alongside the duties of Christian charity, there remains a vast and largely untouched field of work for women in social welfare. That serious hardship exists among entire social classes and among working women. That women’s employment can no longer be prevented, but must be guided into appropriate paths. And that not only working-class women need help and support, but that the situation of educated women who must earn their own living is often one of deep desperation.

In 1899, she took over the chairmanship of the Hanover local group of the German Evangelical Women's Association (DEF), which had been founded shortly before at the Evangelical Church Congress in Kassel. Beginning in 1901, Paula Müller became the first chairwoman of the German Evangelical Women's Association (DEF), prompting the organization's headquarters to move from Kassel to Hanover, where it remains currently. She led the DEF until 1934, expanding its focus on social welfare, especially issues affecting women, and actively supporting moral reform. Notably, she advocated for women's right to vote in church elections, which was achieved in 1903. Despite the DEF's conservative reputation, Müller aligned the organization with the Abolitionist Federation, opposing state-regulated prostitution due to its double standards toward male and female morality, an unexpectedly bold move at the time.

Her work was strongly oriented toward the model of practical Christian charity advocated and exemplified by Johann Hinrich Wichern. For many years, she was closely connected to the institutions founded by him under the Inner Mission, and she was a long-time member of its Central Committee. She brought this close association into the Christian women's movement and the DEF, which she regarded as a complementary branch of the Inner Mission's broader diaconal work.

In 1902, she joined a commission for recruiting and training professional female workers in the Inner Mission. The goal was to provide young women with financial security through such training and to recruit them as suitable personnel for church-based social work. Fields of activity included youth welfare, orphanages, management of girls' homes, city missions, and rescue work. From 1904 to 1932, she was editor of the Evangelical Women’s Newspaper (Evangelische Frauenzeitung). Together with Adelheid von Bennigsen, she founded the Christian-Social Women's Seminary for women and girls of educated classes in Hanover in 1905, which was later renamed Protestant University of Applied Sciences Hanover (Evangelische Fachhochschule Hannover) as part of higher education reform. Since 2007, the school has been integrated into the University of Applied Sciences Hannover.

The Christian-Social Women's School was the first training institution for professional social workers. After successful completion, young women received state recognition and the professional titles “welfare worker” or “social worker.” Paula Mueller also taught there as a lecturer. Her teaching subjects included: poor relief, its concept, method, and legal regulations, and the servant question and organization.

In 1908, she published a handbook on the women's question and the pamphlet The "New Ethics" and Its Danger. In 1911, Paula Mueller co-founded the Association of Conservative Women (VKF). In 1921, she supported Protestant welfare workers in founding their own independent professional association, the Association of Protestant Welfare Workers of Germany (VEW),

== Anti-suffragist activism ==
Under Paula Müller-Otfried's leadership, the German Evangelical Women's Association (DEF) firmly opposed political women's suffrage until 1918. While the DEF supported women's employment within a Christian framework, emphasizing the development of women's unique strengths for the benefit of society, it drew a sharp line at political rights. The organization endorsed voting rights for women in church councils, arguing that responsibilities should be matched by rights. However, it viewed political suffrage as a “two-edged sword”, potentially empowering but also disruptive to traditional family roles and social stability. As expressed in the DEF's 1908 Handbook on the Women’s Question, edited by Müller-Otfried, such rights were seen as “neither in the interest of women, nor of the people and family life as a whole.” This position was consistent with other conservative women's organizations of the time, including the League of Catholic Women (Katholischer Frauenbund), which also opposed suffrage.

== First World War ==
In 1914, she was elected chairwoman of the National Women's Service in Hanover, an alliance of all female aid organizations, both bourgeois and proletarian, which aimed to centrally organize social aid for the population during the war and thereby contribute to successful war efforts. Between 1916 and 1917, she was a board member of the Federation of German Women's Associations (BDF). In 1917, however, her association withdrew from the BDF because it was not willing to support the general demand for the introduction of political suffrage for women.

== Political engagement ==
After 1918, Paula Müller-Otfried became increasingly active in both church and national politics. She joined the regional synod and participated in the first German Evangelical Church Congress in Dresden in 1919. That same year, she ran for the Weimar National Assembly. To distinguish herself from others with the same surname, she adopted the name Müller-Otfried, honoring her grandfather, the classical scholar Karl Otfried Müller, and was elected to the Reichstag in 1920 as a candidate for the conservative German National People's Party (DNVP). She was re-elected twice and served until 1932.

In parliament, Müller-Otfried focused on social welfare policy, women's and youth protection, and improving conditions for small pensioners. She served on the Criminal Law Committee and co-authored the 1921 draft of the Reich Youth Welfare Act (Reichsjugendwohlfahrtsgesetz), introduced by Agnes Neuhaus and supported by women across party lines. From 1928 to 1933, she also worked on revising draft legislation concerning illegitimate children, a project initiated by the Federation of German Women's Associations (BDF). Politically, she secured the DNVP's support for the German Evangelical Women's Association, though this alliance also led to tensions within the broader women's movement.

As women became a significant political force, the DEF could no longer oppose suffrage. Müller-Otfried's political career reflected this shift. She ran for office with the DNVP and represented the party in the Reichstag from 1920 to 1932, advocating for issues such as social protection and family policy. In 1934, she stepped down as chair of the DEF after the organization was integrated into Evangelical Women's Work to avoid Nazi-enforced coordination (Gleichschaltung).

Although she initially viewed National Socialism positively, believing the “national uprising” had ended the instability of the previous 14 years, Müller-Otfried grew increasingly disturbed by the cult of personality around Hitler. She condemned the “unrestrained devotion” and “irresponsible subordination” to the Führer as incompatible with her Christian convictions.

== Later life and honors ==
Paula Müller-Otfried received numerous honors, including the Prussian Red Cross Medal and the War Merit Cross. In 1930, she was awarded an honorary doctorate in theology from the University of Göttingen in recognition of her contributions and life's work, a very rare honor for a woman at the time. She withdrew from public life and died in Einbeck on 8 January 1946.
