= Lothar Steuer =

German politician (1893–1957)

Landtag of North Rhine-Westphalia Deputy
- In office 18 June 1950 – 20 May 1957

First Deputy Bürgermeister, Recklinghausen
- In office September 1939 – May 1945

First Deputy Bürgermeister, Bocholt
- In office October 1935 – September 1939

Reichstag Deputy
- In office 12 November 1933 – 10 April 1938

City Councilor, Kassel
- In office 1924–1933

Landtag of Prussia Deputy
- In office 7 December 1924 – 14 October 1933

Personal details
- Born: Ludwig Lothar Steuer; 31 December 1893 Bad Kreuznach, Rhine Province, Kingdom of Prussia, German Empire
- Died: 20 May 1957 (aged 63) Düsseldorf, West Germany
- Party: German National People's Party
- Other political affiliations: German Right Party; Free Democratic Party
- Education: University of Bonn; University of Heidelberg
- Occupation: Printer, editor
- Profession: Lawyer

Military service
- Allegiance: German Empire
- Branch/service: Imperial German Army
- Years of service: 1914–1918
- Rank: Leutnant
- Unit: 27th Field Artillery Regiment
- Battles/wars: World War I
- Awards: Iron Cross, 1st and 2nd class

Ludwig Lothar Steuer (31 December 1893 – 20 May 1957) was a German lawyer and politician who was active in the Weimar Republic, Nazi Germany and post-war West Germany. During the Weimar years, Steuer was a city councilor in Kassel from 1924 to 1933 and a member of the Landtag of Prussia during the same time period. Under the Nazi regime, he was a member of the Reichstag from November 1933 to April 1938, though he never joined the Nazi Party. In post-war Germany, he served in the Landtag of North Rhine-Westphalia from 1950 until his death. He was successively a member of the leadership in the German National People's Party (DNVP), the German Right Party (DRP) and the Free Democratic Party (FDP).

== Early life ==
After completing Volksschule and Gymnasium in Bad Kreuznach, Steuer studied political science, economics and law at the University of Bonn and the University of Heidelberg. He volunteered for service in the Imperial German Army on 2 August 1914 at the start of the First World War. He served with the 27th Field Artillery Regiment and was promoted to Leutnant of reserves in 1916. He fought for the duration of the war until November 1918 and was awarded the Iron Cross 1st and 2nd class.

== Weimar Republic ==
In 1919, Steuer was a member of a Freikorps unit, a volunteer cavalry rifle corps. Becoming politically active, he joined the conservative German National People's Party (DNVP) in 1919 and became the party's managing director in Hofgeismar and Kassel that same year. From 1921, he served as the party's managing director for the Province of Hesse-Nassau. He also joined the conservative war veterans' organization Der Stahlhelm in 1926. He was the owner of a print shop and, in 1929, he became editor of the journal Deutsche Selbstverwaltung (German Self-Government). Steuer was a city councilor in Kassel from 1924 to 1933. In 1924, he also was elected to the Landtag of Prussia, where he served until its abolition in October 1933.

== Nazi Germany ==
Steuer was elected to the Reichstag from electoral constituency 19 (Hesse Nassau) on 12 November 1933. He was not a member of the Nazi Party, so he took his seat as a "guest" of the Nazi parliamentary faction. He was also appointed as one of the twelve Schriftführer (secretaries) of that body. In October 1935, he was appointed as first deputy Bürgermeister of Bocholt. He was reelected to the Reichstag in March 1936 from constituency 17 (Westphalia North) and continued to serve in his secretarial capacity until April 1938 when he left the Reichstag. In September 1939, he became the first deputy Bürgermeister of Recklinghausen, holding this post until 1945. From 1940 to 1945, he also served in the Wehrmacht during the Second World War.

== Post-war Germany ==
After the end of the war, Steuer worked as a civil servant in local government. In 1946, he was one of the founders and an executive board member of the German Right Party (DRP). On 17 October 1947, denazification proceedings classified him as Category IV (follower). He participated in the negotiations between the DRP, the German Party (DP) and the local Hessian National Democratic Party on 1 July 1949, regarding the formation of a joint candidacy in the 1949 federal election for the first West German Bundestag. This proposal ultimately failed when the British occupation authorities denied the proposed new party a license to participate in the election.

When the Lower Saxony branch of the DRP split in 1950, the majority merged with the DP to form the Deutsche Reichspartei. Steuer remained with the minority and continued to lead the party as the Nationale Recht. In June 1950, Steuer was elected to the Landtag of North Rhine-Westphalia as a representative of the Nationale Recht on the state electoral list of the Free Democratic Party (FDP). He initially served as a "guest" of the FDP parliamentary faction, but formally joined the party on 24 January 1954, and served as its state deputy chairman from July 1954 to April 1955. From July 1954 until his death, he served as second vice-president of the Landtag. He died in Düsseldorf in May 1957.

== Sources ==
- Information about Lothar Steuer in the Reichstag database
- Steuer, Lothar Ludwig. Hessische Biografie. In: Landesgeschichtliches Informationssystem Hessen (LAGIS).
- Schmollinger, Horst W. (1986). "Deutsche Konservative Partei – Deutsche Rechtspartei". In Stöss, Richard (ed.). Parteien-Handbuch: Die Parteien der Bundesrepublik Deutschland 1945–1980. Opladen: VS Verlag für Sozialwissenschaften. ISBN 978-3-531-11838-3.
- Stockhorst, Erich (1985). 5000 Köpfe: Wer War Was im 3. Reich. Arndt. ISBN 978-3-887-41116-9.
