= Carl Gottfried Gok =

German businessman and politician (1869–1945

Reichstag Deputy
- In office 12 November 1933 – 29 March 1936

Reichstag Deputy
- In office 31 July 1932 – 12 November 1933

Reichstag Deputy
- In office 4 May 1924 – 14 September 1930

Personal details
- Born: 1 November 1869 Altshausen, Kingdom of Württemberg, German Empire
- Died: 11 August 1945 (aged 75) Hamburg, Germany
- Party: German National People's Party
- Occupation: Businessman

Military service
- Allegiance: German Empire
- Branch/service: Imperial German Army
- Years of service: 1888–1891
- Rank: Leutnant
- Unit: Grenadier Regiment 123 (5th Württemberg)

Carl Gottfried Gok (1 November 1869 – 11 August 1945) was a German businessman and politician who became the deputy director of the Blohm+Voss shipyard in Hamburg. He was a conservative, a nationalist and a Pan-German League leader who was politically active during the Weimar Republic and Nazi Germany. Gok was a deputy of the Reichstag as a representative of the German National People's Party (DNVP) from 1924 to 1930. He returned to the Reichstag in July 1932 and, after the dissolution of the DNVP in June 1933, remained a deputy as a "guest" of the Nazi Party faction until March 1936, though never formally joining the Party. He held management positions in the German economy throughout the Second World War.

== Early life, education and military service ==
Gok was born in Altshausen, then in the Kingdom of Württemberg, the son of a pastor. He attended the local Volksschule and the Latin school in Göppingen. He then attended theological seminaries in Schöntal and Bad Urach and the Karls-Gymnasium Stuttgart. In 1888, he enlisted in Grenadier Regiment 123 (5th Württemberg) "König Karl" in Ulm as a Fahnenjunker (officer cadet). In February 1890, he was commissioned as a Leutnant and served until December 1891.

== Maritime and shipbuilding ==
After leaving military service, he emigrated to America but soon determined to return to Germany and took passage as a cabin boy on a Bremen-based sailing ship. Turning to maritime pursuits, he next served as a sailor and quartermaster on British vessels. In 1896, he became a helmsman, and in 1899, he passed the shipmaster's exam at the navigation school in Lübeck. From 1896 to 1911, Gok was employed by the Hamburg-America Line, one of the world's largest shipping companies. He worked as a ship's officer, as an inspector in east Asia and as the head of the company's branches in Tsingtau (today, Qingdao; 1905–1908) and Hong Kong (1908–1910).

In July 1911, Gok went to work for the large Blohm+Voss shipyard in Hamburg. During the First World War, he served as an auxiliary officer of the secret intelligence service at the high commands of the 1st and 2nd armies from 1914 to 1915. From the end of 1915, at the behest of the Imperial German Navy, he went to Constantinople as a representative (authorized signatory) of Blohm+Voss, advising the Ottoman government on plans to expand shipyard production. After the end of the war, Gok steadily advanced at the Blohm+Voss shipyard and eventually rose to the position of deputy director before his retirement in 1933. In 1919, he became a member of the Pan-German League, advancing to a seat on its executive board in 1924. From 1921, he was also an Assessor at the Hamburg Trade Court and a member of the board of the Verein Deutscher Eisen- und Stahlindustrieller (Association of German Iron and Steel Industrialists). In 1927, he became a labor court judge. From 1928 until 1934, he was a member of the executive committee of the German Industrial Association. In 1930, Gok received an honorary doctorate in political science from the University of Tübingen.

== Political career ==
Apart from his work managing the shipyard, Gok was politically active in the conservative German National People's Party (DNVP), for which he sat as a deputy of the Reichstag for electoral constituency 34 (Hamburg) from May 1924 to September 1930. As the head of the Hamburg regional association of the DNVP, Gok played a key role in elevating Alfred Hugenberg to the chairmanship of the party in 1928. In October 1931, he was a participant in the formation of the Harzburg Front, an attempt to unite all the right-wing opponents of the Weimar regime.

Gok did not stand for reelection to the Reichstag in the September 1930 election, but returned to office in the election of July 1932 as a candidate on the DNVP national electoral list. In the election of November 1932, he was again elected from his Hamburg constituency. After the Nazi seizure of power, all the bourgeois political parties (including the DNVP), dissolved themselves in the early summer of 1933 under pressure from the Nazi Party. Gok was allowed to retain his seat in the Reichstag as a "guest" of the Nazi Party faction, though never formally joining the Party. At the 29 March 1936 election, he again stood for reelection, but did not receive a mandate.

From 1933 to 1945, Gok held management positions at the Pomeranian Lime Works and the Stone and Earth Economic Association. From 1940 to 1945, he was recruited to head the production department at the Landwirtschaftsamt (agricultural office). Gok died in the St. Pauli quarter of Hamburg in August 1945.

== Sources ==
- Claß, Heinrich (2022). Hofmeister, Björn (ed.). Politische Erinnerungen des Vorsitzenden des Alldeutschen Verbandes 1915–1933/1936. Duncker & Humblot. ISBN 978-3-428-18671-6.
- Federal Archives Estate N 1034, Gok, Carl Gottfried
- Gok, Gottfried in the Akten der Reichskanzlei. Weimarer Republik
- Information about Carl Gottfried Gok in the Reichstag database
- Martin Schumacher, Katharina Lübbe, and Wilhelm Heinz Schröder: Die Reichstagsabgeordneten der Weimarer Republik. 1991, p. 241.
