= Fritz Kleiner =

German politician and businessman (1893–1974)

Reichstag Deputy
- In office 12 November 1933 – 10 April 1938

Reichstag Deputy
- In office 6 November 1932 – 12 November 1933

Reichstag Deputy
- In office 2 December 1929 – 31 July 1932

Personal details
- Born: 6 May 1893 Beuthen, Province of Silesia, Kingdom of Prussia, German Empire
- Died: 8 October 1974 (aged 81) Stuttgart, Baden-Württemberg, West Germany
- Party: German National People's Party
- Education: Doctor of Law
- Alma mater: Martin Luther University Halle-Wittenberg; Ludwig-Maximilians-Universität München; University of Breslau
- Occupation: Lawyer; Businessman
- Civilian awards: Order of Merit of the Federal Republic of Germany

Military service
- Allegiance: German Empire
- Branch/service: Imperial German Army
- Years of service: 1914–1918
- Rank: Leutnant of reserves
- Unit: 4th Landwehr Field Artillery Regiment
- Military awards: Iron Cross, 1st and 2nd class

Fritz Kleiner (6 May 1893 – 8 October 1974) was a German lawyer, construction company owner and politician from Upper Silesia. He was active in the German National People's Party during the Weimar Republic. Except for the period from July to November 1932, he was a member of the Reichstag from 1929 to 1938. Following the Nazi seizure of power, he remained in the national legislature but never joined the Nazi Party. After the Second World War, Kleiner headed an agency that provided housing for displaced persons in West Germany.

== Education and war service ==
Kleiner was born in Beuthen (today, Bytom) in Upper Silesia and attended Mittelschule and Oberrealschule in Kattowitz (today, Katowice). He went on to study law and political science at the Martin Luther University Halle-Wittenberg, the Ludwig-Maximilians-Universität München, and the University of Breslau, where he earned his Doctor of Law degree. In Breslau (today, Wrocław), he joined the Turnerschaft (academic gymnastic club) Suevia Breslau. Kleiner served as a front-line soldier throughout the First World War, rising to the rank of Leutnant of reserves in the 4th Landwehr Field Artillery Regiment and earning both classes of the Iron Cross.

== Career in the Weimar Republic and Nazi Germany ==
From the end of the war in November 1918, Kleiner was the national organizer of the United Associations of Loyal Upper Silesians. During the 1921 Upper Silesia plebiscite, Kleiner helped to organize the German vote to retain Upper Silesia within the German Reich. He became editor-in-chief of the newspapers Ostdeutsche Morgenpost in Beuthen and Ostdeutscher Herold in Gleiwitz (today, Gliwice). He was prosecuted and briefly expelled by the Inter-Allied Commission. He returned and took part in the third Silesian uprising, receiving both classes of the Silesian Badge of Merit. From 1922, he owned an industrial construction company, Hermann Hirt Nachfolger, GmbH., in Beuthen.

Kleiner became a member of the conservative German National People's Party (DNVP) and served as a city councilor in Beuthen until 1933, and as a member of the Upper Silesian Provincial Landtag until 1932. In December 1929, he first entered the Reichstag as a DNVP deputy from electoral constituency 9 (Oppeln), succeeding Edgar Wolf who had resigned. Except for the period from July to November 1932, Kleiner was continually re-elected to this seat, switching to constituency 14 (Weser-Ems) at the 29 March 1936 election. He remained a member after the Nazi seizure of power and the dissolution of the DNVP, but since he did not join the Nazi Party, he was admitted as a "guest" of the Nazi Party faction from July 1933 onward. Although he sought reelection in 1938, he did not obtain a mandate. From October 1933, Kleiner was a member of Hans Frank's Academy for German Law.

== Post-war life ==
In August 1948, Kleiner founded and, until his death, served as chairman of the Vorstand (executive board) of the non-profit Refugee Housing Cooperative (FLÜWO Bauen Wohnen) in Stuttgart. A displaced person himself, his aim was to ameliorate the existing post-war housing shortage, especially among refugees from the east. He was also a council member of the Upper Silesian Association, an organization dedicated to the cultivation of Upper Silesian culture, customs and traditions. For his services to the state, Kleiner twice was awarded the Order of Merit of the Federal Republic of Germany: the Cross of Merit in 1952, and the Cross of Merit, 1st class (Officer's Cross), in 1968. He died in Stuttgart in October 1974.

== Sources ==
- Information about Fritz Kleiner in the Reichstag database
- Beatrix Herlemann, Helga Schatz: Biographisches Lexikon niedersächsischer Parlamentarier 1919–1945 (= Veröffentlichungen der Historischen Kommission für Niedersachsen und Bremen. Band 222). Hahnsche Buchhandlung, Hannover 2004, ISBN 3-7752-6022-6, p. 192.
- Joachim Lilla, Martin Döring, Andreas Schulz: Statisten in Uniform. Die Mitglieder des Reichstags 1933–1945. Ein biographisches Handbuch. Unter Einbeziehung der völkischen und nationalsozialistischen Reichstagsabgeordneten ab Mai 1924. Droste, Düsseldorf 2004, ISBN 3-7700-5254-4.
- Jörn Petrick: Gedenkbuch der Landsmannschaft Saxo-Suevia zu Erlangen. Zur Erinnerung an unsere verstorbenen Bundesbrüder (1878-2010) Selbstverlag, Erlangen 2010.
