= Ludwig Münchmeyer =

Ludwig Johannes Herbert Martin Münchmeyer (June 2, 1885 – July 24, 1947) was an Evangelical German pastor known for antisemitism. He led an "antisemitic spa" on the island of Borkum. He won a libel suit against Bruno Weil, but enough of the allegations of loose morals and scandalous misconduct against him were confirmed that he was defrocked in 1929. He later acted as a prominent Nazi speaker after leaving the German National People's Party. He also propagandized for the Nazi Party in Weser-Ems. He was a long-serving Nazi deputy to the Reichstag during both the Weimar Republic and Nazi Germany from 1930 to 1945.

== Biography ==
Ludwig Münchmeyer came from an old, Lower Saxonian family of pastors, which can be traced back to Heinrich Münchmeyer (around 1654–1728), a tax official in Einbeck. He was born at Hoel in the Province of Hanover, the son of Carl Hans Wilhelm Ludwig Münchmeyer and Henriette Friederike Adelgunde Münchmeyer, née Brakebusch. In Rinteln he attended the Gymnasium.

He studied Protestant theology at the universities of Erlangen, Leipzig and Göttingen and took the second theological examination in March 1911. On 17 June of the same year he was ordained. He was first employed as a seafarer's pastor in Cardiff in Great Britain. In March 1915 he became a military chaplain. He then became a military hospital chaplain in Hanover.

At the September 1930 parliamentary election, Münchmeyer was elected to the Reichstag from electoral constituency 33 (Hesse-Darmstadt). At the following two elections, he was returned from the Nazi Party electoral list and then again represented Hesse-Darmstadt from November 1933 through May 1945.
