= Friedrich Everling =

German politician and writer (1891–1958)

Reichstag Deputy
- In office 12 November 1933 – 8 May 1945

Reichstag Deputy
- In office May 1924 – 12 November 1933

Landtag of Mecklenburg-Strelitz Deputy
- In office 13 March 1932 – 14 October 1933

Personal details
- Born: 5 September 1891 Sankt Goar, Rhine Province, Kingdom of Prussia, German Empire
- Died: 17 April 1958 (aged 66) Menton, France
- Party: German National People's Party
- Education: Doctor of Law
- Alma mater: University of Jena; Ludwig-Maximilians-Universität München; University of Bonn; University of Halle; University of Freiburg
- Occupation: Lawyer; Judge

Military service
- Allegiance: German Empire
- Branch/service: Imperial German Army
- Years of service: 1914–1918
- Rank: Fahnenjunker

Friedrich Wilhelm Everling (5 September 1891 – 17 April 1958) was a German lawyer, judge, writer, and politician of the German National People's Party (DNVP). He served as a deputy in the German Reichstag from 1924 to 1945. After the end of the Second World War, he emigrated from Germany to France where he published novels under the pseudonym Schlehdorn (Blackthorn).

== Early life ==
Friedrich Everling was born at Sankt Goar, the son of the theologian and politician Otto Everling (1864–1945). After attending Volksschule and Gymnasium in Krefeld and Halle (Saale), he studied law and political science at the University of Jena, the Ludwig-Maximilians-Universität München, the University of Bonn, and the University of Halle through 1911. In 1913, he passed the first state examination in law. On 8 August 1914, he received his Doctor of Law degree from Halle with a thesis on the subject of "The Prussian Official Oath." He subsequently entered the service of the foreign office as a Referendar (apprentice lawyer). In 1914, Everling volunteered for military service as a Fahnenjunker (officer cadet) and fought in the First World War. He passed the second state law examination in 1918 after his discharge from the military.

== Life under the Weimar Republic ==
In 1919, Everling was dismissed from his civil service post for refusing to take the official oath to the new Weimar Republic. He then worked in private legal practice in Berlin-Halensee and Neubrandenburg until 1933. He joined the conservative German National People's Party (DNVP) and also was a member, and for a time the chairman, of the nationalist and monarchist Bund der Aufrechten (League of the Upright) before it was banned in 1922 as an anti-republican organization. Everling also worked as a writer, serving as the editor of the journal "Konservative Monatsschrift" (Conservative Monthly). He also published numerous works on politics and constitutional law, including Flaggenfrage (The Flag Question, 1927), Organischer Aufbau des dritten Reichs (The Organic Structure of the Third Reich, 1931) and Wiederentdeckte Monarchie (The Rediscovered Monarchy, 1932).

Everling was elected to the Reichstag for the DNVP in the parliamentary election of May 1924 from electoral constituency 35 (Mecklenburg). At the September 1930 and July 1932 elections, he was elected from the DNVP electoral list before returning to represent his Mecklenburg constituency at the November 1932 election. He was also a member of the Landtag of the Free State of Mecklenburg-Strelitz from March 1932 until it was abolished by the Nazis in October 1933.

== Career in Nazi Germany ==
After the Nazi seizure of power in January 1933, Everling returned to the civil service, becoming a senior administrative court judge in Berlin through 1938. Following the dissolution of the DNVP in June 1933, Everling continued to sit in the Reichstag as a "guest" of the Nazi Party faction from July 1933 until the fall of the regime in May 1945. In 1936, he received a second doctorate in economics and political science (Dr. rer. pol.) from the University of Freiburg. After the outbreak of the Second World War in 1939, Everling secured a post as a Kriegsverwaltungsrat (war administration councilor). From 1941 to 1943, he served as a judge at the Reichsgericht, the supreme civil and criminal court in Leipzig.

== Post-war life ==
After the end of the war in 1945, Everling lived in Düsseldorf and in Metzingen before moving to Menton on the French Riviera, where he continued to write, and where he died in April 1958.

=== Selected works ===
This is a list of selected post-war novels by Friedrich Everling, using the pen name Schlehdorn (Blackthorn).

- Der Flüchtling du Chêne (1947)
- Silhouette (1948)
- Die drei Putten (1950)
- Das Pendel schwingt (1951)
- Die eiserne Rose (1953)
- Die zärtliche Treppe (1954)
- Die Sphinx und der Regierungsrat (1957)

== Sources ==
- Kosch, Wilhelm (1968). Deutsches Literatur-Lexikon : Biographisch und bibliographisches Handbuch, Fünfzehnter Band. Bern: K.G. Saur Verlag.
- Everling, Friedrich (Pseud. Schlehdorn) in the Akten der Reichskanzlei. Weimarer Republik
- Friedrich Everling in the Parlamentarierportal (BIOPARL) (Biographies of German parliamentarians)
- Information about Friedrich Everling in the Reichstag database
