= Edmund Forschbach =

German lawyer and politician (1903–1988)

Federal Press Chief West German Press and Information Office
- In office 1 May 1955 – 30 June 1956

Reichstag Deputy
- In office 12 November 1933 – 10 July 1934

Leader of the Cartellverband
- In office 7 July 1933 – 25 March 1934

Landtag of Prussia Deputy
- In office 5 March 1933 – 14 October 1933

Personal details
- Born: 11 December 1903 Dortmund, Kingdom of Prussia, German Empire
- Died: 23 March 1988 (aged 84) Cologne, West Germany
- Party: German National People's Party
- Education: Doctor of Law
- Alma mater: University of Freiburg; Humboldt University of Berlin; University of Münster
- Profession: Lawyer
- Awards: Grand Cross of Merit with Star; Grand Cross of Merit; Grand Silver Decoration of Honor for Services to the Republic of Austria

Military service
- Allegiance: Nazi Germany
- Branch/service: German Army
- Years of service: 1943–1945
- Rank: Gefreiter
- Battles/wars: World War II

Edmund Wilhelm Mathias Gottfried Forschbach (11 December 1903 – 23 March 1988) was a German lawyer and politician. During the Weimar Republic, he was a member of the German National People's Party (DNVP). During Nazi Germany, he was a member of the Reichstag and headed the Cartellverband, the umbrella organization for Catholic student fraternities, from 1933 to 1934. He was expelled from the Reichstag in July 1934 for his association with the conservative opposition to the Nazi regime. During the Second World War, he served in the German armed forces as an enlisted man.

After undergoing denazification in postwar Germany, he headed the Press and Information Office of the West German government from 1955 to 1956. After public revelations of his early support for the Nazi regime, he resigned as the federal press chief and was transferred to less visible government posts.

== Youth and education ==
Forschbach was born to a Catholic family in Dortmund and attended the local Volksschule and the Hindenburg-Realgymnasium from 1910 to 1923. He studied law from 1923 to 1927 at the universities of Freiburg, Berlin, and Münster. In Freiburg, Forschbach joined the Catholic student fraternity KDStV Ripuaria Freiburg im Breisgau, a member of the Cartellverband (CV), the union of Catholic college fraternities.

In addition, Forschbach distinguished himself during this time as a contributor to various conservative oriented journals: from 1924 to 1927, he was a contributor to the journals Das Gewissen, Das Deutsche Volk, Der Student and Volk und Reich. He also wrote for the journal Jungdeutscher, the official publication of the Young German Order, a nationalist and antisemitic association.

== Legal and political career ==
After passing his first state law examination, Forschbach served as a Referendar (trainee lawyer) in the district of the higher regional court of Hamm from 1928 to 1930. After passing the second state law exam, Forschbach became an Assessor in 1931 and practiced law in Dortmund at the Amtsgericht (district court) and the Landgericht (regional court) from 1932 to 1934. During these years, Forschbach was politically active in the conservative German National People's Party (DNVP), which he joined on 15 August 1930. From December 1931 until the DNVP's dissolution in June 1933, Forschbach was a member of the party's national executive committee. He also was a close colleague of the party chairman Alfred Hugenberg and was an associate of conservative publicists and theorists such as Edgar Jung and Franz Mariaux. In October 1931, along with numerous other representatives of the right-wing political spectrum (DNVP, Nazi Party and Der Stahlhelm), he participated in the formation of the Harzburg Front which sought to present a united conservative opposition to the Weimar Republic.

Following the Nazi seizure of power in early 1933, Oskar Stäbel, a Nazi and the federal leader of the German Student Union (DSt), appointed Forschbach as the CV-Verbandsführer (CV Association Leader) on 7 July 1933. Forschbach held this position until his dismissal on 25 March 1934 for opposing the requirement for compulsory dueling demanded by Stäbel. During this time, he also wrote articles for the conservative Catholic newspaper Germania and the journal Academia, the official publication of the CV. An example of his support for the Nazi regime follows:

The CV affirms its commitment to the National Socialist revolution as the great intellectual upheaval of our time. The CV intends and must be the bearer and herald of the idea of the Third Reich... and therefore the CV will be governed in the spirit of National Socialism... Only the National Socialist state, which will powerfully emerge from the revolution, can bring us the re-Christianization of our culture... Long live the CV! Long live the Greater German Reich! Heil to our Führer Adolf Hitler!

On 5 March 1933, Forschbach was elected as a DNVP deputy of the Landtag of Prussia and, after the party disbanded at the end of June, he retained his seat as a "guest" of the Nazi Party faction until the Landtag was dissolved by the Nazis on 14 October 1933. At the 12 November national election, he was elected as a deputy of the Reichstag from electoral constituency 18 (Westphalia South) as a "guest" of the Nazi Party faction. From August 1933 to March 1934, Forschbach was also a member of the Sturmabteilung (SA), the Nazi paramilitary organization. He was never a member of the Nazi Party.

Forschbach had unsuccessfully sought to prevent the absorption of the CV into the National Socialist German Students' League by encouraging his members to support the regime in hopes of pursuing common goals. However, after it became clear that the Nazis intended to bring all student and youth organizations under their sole control, and after his removal as leader of the CV, he moved to a position of opposition to the regime. In spring 1934, Forschbach was involved in the planning of a conservative coup against the Hitler government, which his friend Edgar Jung was developing together with Oberregierungsrat (senior government councilor) Herbert von Bose and several other staff members of Vice-Chancellor Franz von Papen. This culminated in Papen's Marburg speech on 17 June 1934, which was critical of the regime's excesses and called for restoring a measure of civil liberties. After the arrests of Jung on 25 June 1934 and Mariaux on 28 June, Forschbach went into hiding for several days. Following Papen's house arrest and the extrajudicial murders of Jung and Bose during the Night of the Long Knives, Forschbach fled to an abbey in Nettersheim, after which he crossed the border into the Netherlands between Aachen and Vaals. His mandate to the Reichstag was revoked on 10 July for "preparation for high treason", according to a letter by Reichsminister of the Interior, Wilhelm Frick. Only at the end of 1934 did he return to Germany, where he settled in Cologne to practice law. Between September 1939 and April 1943, Forschbach served as an assistant judge in Breslau (today, Wrocław). He was conscripted as a soldier in the Wehrmacht until the end of the war, with the rank of Gefreiter.

== Post-war life ==
Following Germany's surrender in May 1945, Forschbach was briefly detained by the allied forces. Following his denazification proceedings, he was classified as "exonerated" (category V). From 1946 to 1951, he worked for the Cologne city administration, ultimately as administrative director.

In 1951, Forschbach transferred to the West German Federal Ministry of the Interior as a Ministerialrat (ministerial councilor) and, on 18 June 1954, he was appointed deputy head of the Presse- und Informationsamt der Bundesregierung (federal press and information office). The appointment was made at the instigation of State Secretary Hans Globke, an old friend of Forschbach's and also a fellow member of his student fraternity. On 1 May 1955, Forschbach was promoted to Federal Press Chief in the government headed by German Chancellor Konrad Adenauer. Public criticism of Forschbach was sparked by revelations concerning his activities in the early days of the Nazi dictatorship, including his oversight of the Gleichschaltung (coordination) of the CV with the Nazi regime, which eventually led to the organization's closure. The 1 February 1956 issue of the Hamburg news magazine Der Spiegel quoted an excerpt from an appeal that Forschbach had published on 2 November 1933, on the occasion of the Reichstag election and the referendum on Germany's withdrawal from the League of Nations. At that time he wrote: "All men in the CV must joyfully pledge their allegiance to the banners of Adolf Hitler in these decisive times. Anyone who does not vote 'yes' in the referendum on November 12th and does not vote for the NSDAP's Reichstag list breaks their fraternity oath, because in the hour of greatest danger they betray their fatherland and their people."

On 30 June 1956, Forschbach was removed as press chief. Until 1961, he served as a Ministerialdirigent (ministerial conductor), heading the Food Affairs Subdivision in the Ministry of the Interior. From 1961 to 1968, he was a Ministerialdirektor (ministerial director) and head of Department II for Food Affairs and Veterinary Medicine in the Ministry of Health. He was awarded several civil decorations, including the Grand Cross of Merit with Star. After his retirement, he served as president of the German Food Commission from 1969 to 1972. He spent his final years in Ballrechten-Dottingen and Brühl, dying in Cologne in March 1988.

== Honors ==
- 1961: Grand Silver Decoration of Honor for Services to the Republic of Austria
- 1968: Grand Cross of Merit of the Federal Republic of Germany
- 1984: Grand Cross of Merit with Star

== Writings ==
- Deutschland, neutralistisch oder frei. Essen: Industriedr. und Verlag-Dienst, 1956.
- Edgar J. Jung. Ein konservativer Revolutionär 30. Juni 1934. Pfullingen: Neske, 1984, ISBN 978-3-788-50267-6.

== Sources ==
- Forschbach, Edmund (1984). Edgar J. Jung. Ein konservativer Revolutionär. 30. Juni 1934. Pfullingen: Neske Verlag. ISBN 978-3-788-50267-6.
- Lilla, Joachim; Doring, Martin; Schulz, Andreas (2004). Statisten in Uniform: Die Mitglieder des Reichstags 1933–1945. Ein biographisches Handbuch. Unter Einbeziehung der völkischen und nationalsozialistischen Reichstagsabgeordneten ab Mai 1924. Düsseldorf: Droste. ISBN 978-3-770-05254-7.
- Orth, Rainer (2016). "Der Amtssitz der Opposition"? Politik und Staatsumbaupläne im Büro des Stellvertreters des Reichskanzlers in den Jahren 1933–1934. Cologne: Böhlau Verlag. ISBN 978-3-412-50555-4.
- Stockhorst, Erich (1985). 5000 Köpfe: Wer War Was im 3. Reich. Arndt. p. 140. ISBN 978-3-887-41116-9.
