= Württemberg (electoral district) =

Former constituency of the Reichstag (Weimar Republic)

31 Württemberg
- Former electoral constituency for the Reichstag
- Location within the Weimar Republic
- State: Württemberg
- Electorate: 1,500,995 (1919); 1,855,752 (1933)
- Major settlements: Stuttgart, Ulm, Heilbronn, Esslingen, Reutlingen, Ludwigsburg

Former constituency
- Created: 1919
- Abolished: 1938

Württemberg was one of the 35 electoral districts (German: Wahlkreise) used to elect members to the Reichstag during the Weimar Republic. It sent members to the Reichstag in nine democratic elections between 1919 and 1933. It existed nominally in the show elections to the Nazi Reichstag until 1938.

It comprised the Free People's State of Württemberg as well as the Province of Hohenzollern from the Free State of Prussia. It was constituency 31 in the numbering scheme.

== Electoral system ==
The constituency was created for the 1919 election. Under the proportional representation electoral system of the Weimar Republic, voters cast a vote for party lists. Parties were awarded a seat for every 60,000 votes in a constituency. Excess votes were aggregated at two higher levels of seat distribution: an intermediate level combining multiple constituencies, where extra seats were awarded to parties' constituency lists, and a national level where seats were awarded to national lists of each party or alliance.

== Results (1919–1933) ==
=== Vote share ===
Party	1919	1920	1924 I	1924 II	1928	1930	1932 I	1932 II	1933
KPD		3.2	11.3	8.1	7.2	9.4	11.0	14.5	9.2
USPD	2.7	12.8							
SPD	35.4	15.9	15.7	20.3	23.6	20.1	17.6	15.2	14.7
DDP	25.0	14.3	9.4	10.8	9.5	5.5	2.4	3.0	2.1
Centre	22.8	23.8	21.7	23.4	20.4	21.6	21.8	20.5	17.7
DVP		3.8	4.4	5.7	5.5	4.3	0.9	1.5	0.7
WP				0.5	1.3	2.8	0.2	0.1	
CSVD						6.5	3.6	4.3	3.1
WBWB	(Note: Joint list with DNVP.)	17.3	19.5	17.8	17.3	12.8	6.9	8.0	5.3
DNVP	13.7	8.9	9.9	10.9	6.2	3.9	3.8	5.3	5.1
Nazi			4.1	2.1	1.9	9.4	30.3	26.2	41.9
Other	0.3		4.1	0.4	7.1	3.8	1.5	1.4	0.1
Turnout	88.7	77.1	77.9	74.0	68.3	79.3	77.1	71.7	85.7
Source: Wahlen in Deutschland

=== Deputies ===
Election	Distribution	Seats
1919		17
1920		15
May 1924		19
Dec 1924		17
1928		14
1930		22
Jul 1932		22
Nov 1932		19
1933		24
Source: Wahlen in Deutschland
