= Demmin mass suicide =

1945 mass suicide in Germany following the Red Army invasion

Coordinates: 53.905°N 13.049°E

On 1 May 1945, hundreds of people killed themselves in the town of Demmin, in the Province of Pomerania (now in Mecklenburg-Vorpommern), Germany. Although death toll estimates vary, it is acknowledged to be the largest mass suicide ever recorded in Germany. The suicide was part of a mass suicide wave amongst the population of Nazi Germany.

Nazi officials, the police, the Wehrmacht, and many citizens had left the town before the arrival of the Red Army, while thousands of refugees from the East had also taken refuge in Demmin. Three Soviet negotiators were shot prior to the Soviet advance into Demmin and Hitler Youth, amongst others, fired on Soviet soldiers once inside the town. The retreating Wehrmacht had blown up the bridges over the Peene and Tollense rivers, which enclosed the town to the north, west, and south, thus blocking the Red Army's advance and trapping the remaining civilians. The Soviet units looted and burned down the town, and committed rapes and executions.

Numerous inhabitants and refugees then killed themselves, with many families doing so together. Methods of suicides included drowning in the rivers, hanging, wrist-cutting, and shooting. Most bodies were buried in mass graves, and after the war, discussion of the mass suicide was taboo under the East German Communist government.

== Background ==
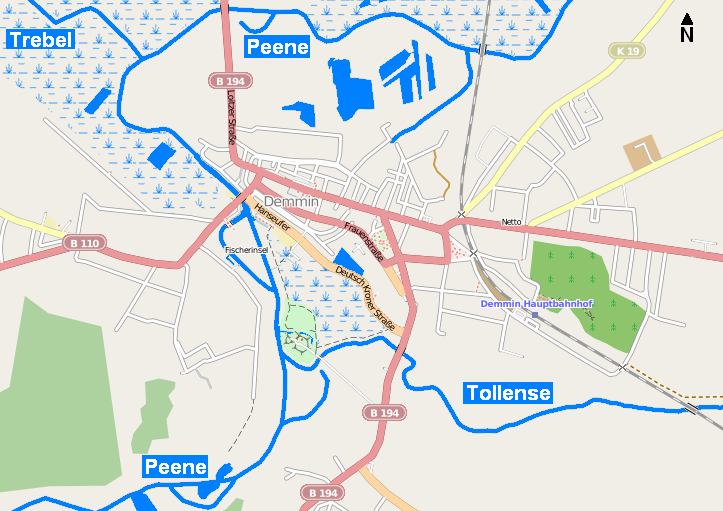
Demmin, enclosed by the Peene river in the north and west, and the Tollense river in the south. The bridges were blown up by the retreating Wehrmacht, the Red Army approached the town from the east. Modified OSM map.

Demmin was a stronghold of the nationalistic organisations DNVP and Der Stahlhelm in the Weimar Republic. Before 1933, there were boycotts of Jewish businesses, which drove away most of the Jews. The synagogue was sold in June 1938 to a furniture company, which is why it survives as a building today. In the last national elections to the Reichstag on 5 March 1933, the Nazi Party won 53.7 percent of votes in Demmin. During the Kristallnacht thousands gathered in the square in anti-Semitic demonstration.

During the last weeks of World War II, tens of thousands of Germans killed themselves, especially in territories occupied by the Red Army. The German historian Udo Grashhoff and the German author Kurt Bauer wrote that the suicides occurred in two stages: in a first wave before the Red Army's arrival, in part due to a "fear of the Russians" spread by Nazi propaganda, and – as in Demmin – in a second wave after the Red Army's arrival, triggered by executions, looting, and mass rapes committed by Soviet soldiers.

In 1945, Demmin had between 15,000 and 16,000 inhabitants. Thousands of refugees from the East were also in town, roughly doubling its population. In late April, when the Eastern Front drew closer (Battle of Berlin), women, children, and elderly men were forced to dig a 5-kilometre (3.1 mi)-long anti-tank ditch east of the town. On 28 April, the German flight from the town began: the Nazi party functionaries left in confiscated fire engines, the hospital was evacuated, all the police departed, and a number of civilians fled.

Demmin was reached by spearheads of the Soviet 65th Army and the 1st Guards Tank Corps at noon on 30 April 1945. At the tower of the church, a white banner was hoisted. According to an eyewitness, Soviet negotiators approached the anti-tank ditch and promised to spare Demmin's civilian population from "harassment" and looting in the case of a surrender without fight. This eyewitness was then 19 years old, serving as a German soldier, and lying in the anti-tank ditch. According to him, three shots were fired which left three men dead – one of them a German officer. The remaining Wehrmacht units, belonging to Army Group Weichsel, and some Waffen-SS, retreated through Demmin, and about half an hour after the incident, blew up all bridges leading out of town behind them. By that time, Soviet units were already advancing through Demmin.

The destruction of the bridges prevented the Soviets from advancing westward toward Rostock, which they had planned to reach the same day. It also prevented the flight of the civilian population, who were trapped by the rivers surrounding the town. According to eyewitnesses, some "fanatics", primarily Hitler Youth, shot at the Soviet soldiers, despite several white flags being hoisted on Demmin's buildings. Memorably, a Nazi loyalist schoolteacher, having shot his wife and children, launched a grenade on Soviet soldiers using a panzerfaust, before finally hanging himself. According to the Focus magazine, an eyewitness stated that the first Soviet soldier was shot near the hospital at 11:05 AM by someone running amok, apparently the aforementioned teacher, who had before told a neighbor that he had killed his wife and his children. A third eyewitness confirmed the identity of the gunman in a report by Norddeutscher Rundfunk, while blaming him for causing the Soviet troops to retaliate by plundering and burning the town. Then, it was "quiet" until the evening, when the atrocities started. Another incident is said to have happened on 1 May, when the local pharmacist hosted a "victory party" of Soviet officers, killing them with poisoned wine. Focus magazine however dismissed that as a "legend" and theologian and historian Norbert Buske concluded in a 1995 study that the story had been fabricated.

The Soviet soldiers in turn were allowed to loot the town for a period of three days. They committed mass rapes of local women, according to eyewitnesses, "regardless of age", and shot German men who spoke up against this practice. Furthermore, large areas of the town were set on fire, with nearly all of the center burning down completely. Within three days, 80% of the town was destroyed. Reportedly, Soviet soldiers had doused the houses' walls with petrol, before setting them on fire, and stood guard for three days to prevent extinguishing. Many of the soldiers committing the mass rapes, executions, and pillaging were reportedly drunk. On 30 April, when the atrocities started in the evening, Soviet soldiers had looted both Demmin's grain distilleries and several alcohol stores.

== Suicides ==
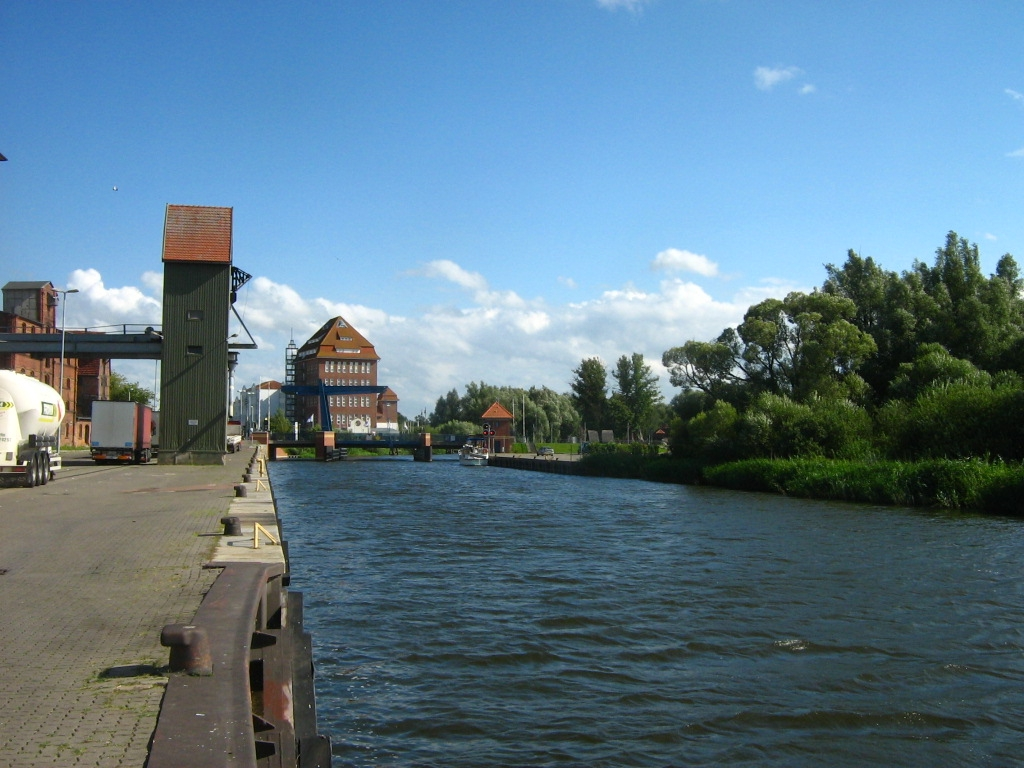
The Peene river in Demmin in 2007

These events, along with the fear of atrocities stirred up by the Nazi propaganda before, caused a mass panic among the population. Many local and refugee families killed themselves together. The suicides were either performed with guns, razor blades, poison, or hanging, while others drowned themselves in the Peene and Tollense rivers. Several mothers killed their children before killing themselves, or walked into one of the rivers with a rock in a backpack and their babies in their arms. Some families died by walking into the rivers, tied together. A local forester shot three young children, then their mothers, then his wife, and then himself, surviving but losing his sight. In another recorded case, a daughter cut the wrists of her parents.

Not every suicide attempt was completed. Some mothers who had drowned their children were unable to drown themselves thereafter. In other cases, doses of poison proved to be lethal for children, but not for their mothers. There were also cases where children survived attempted drownings. Some members who survived a first attempt at suicide killed themselves by other methods. A mother and her repeatedly raped daughter, for instance, died by hanging themselves in an attic, after repeatedly failing to drown themselves in the Peene river. Another mother who had poisoned and buried three of her four children before, tried to hang herself on an oak three times, only to be prevented from doing so each time by Soviet soldiers. There are further records of Soviet soldiers preventing suicides by retrieving people from the river and nursing cut wrists. In another case, a grandfather forcibly took away a razor blade from a mother who was about to kill her children and herself after being raped by Soviet soldiers and hearing of the death of her husband. After Soviet soldiers had raped a girl to death and shot her father, an aunt cut her daughter's and son's wrists as well as her own. The other women of the family committed suicide, only one aunt was able to save the grandmother. One family survived, because the 15-year-old son persuaded his mother, one of the rape victims, to save herself, when she was already being dragged by the Tollense river.

Demmin's current chronicler, Gisela Zimmer, then 14 years old, recalls:

My mother was also raped. And then, together with us and with neighbors, she hurried towards the Tollense river, resolutely prepared to jump into it. [...] My siblings [...] realized only much later that I had held her back, that I had pulled her out of what may be called a state of trance, to prevent her from jumping into the water. There were people. There was screaming. The people were prepared to die. Children were told: 'Do you want to live on? The town is burning. These and those are dead already. No, we do not want to live any more.' And so, people went mostly into the rivers. [...] That made the Russians feel creepy, too. There are examples where Russians, too, tried to pull people out or hinder them. But these hundreds of people, they were unable to withhold. And the population here was extremely panicked.

Zimmer writes that many of the dead were buried in mass graves on the Bartholomäi graveyard. Some were buried in individual graves at relatives' request. Others went unburied, as their bodies were not retrieved from the rivers. More than 900 bodies were buried in the mass graves; 500 of them were recorded on pages of a warehouse accountant's book converted into a death register. Weeks after the mass suicide, bodies still floated in the rivers. Clothing and other belongings of the drowned formed a border along the rivers' banks, up to 2 metres (6.6 ft) wide.

== Death toll ==
Focus magazine (1995) quoted Norbert Buske as saying, "We will have to assume more than 1,000 deaths." According to Goeschel (2009), with reference to Buske (1995), "Some 700 to 1,000 people are said to have committed suicide directly after the arrival of the Red Army"; Grashoff (2006), using the same reference, stated that "estimates of the number of suicides range from 700 to 1,200." Der Spiegel (2005) put the death toll at "more than 1,000". The NDR stated that "nearly a thousand women and children committed suicide." Bauer (2008) wrote that "some thousand people committed suicide, mostly by drowning." According to psychologist Bscheid (2009) and jurist and sociologist Volkersen (2005), it was the largest recorded mass suicide in Germany. Both mentioned 900 suicides. Rostock historian Fred Mrotzek estimated that the death toll was 1,200 to 2,500 people. The local cemetery recorded over 600 burials in May to July 1945.

== East German taboo ==
Under the Communist East German government, the mass suicide became taboo. The site of the mass graves was deliberately neglected, became overgrown, and was at times cultivated to grow sugar beets. The only visible hint of the mass grave was a solitary monument with the engraved date "1945", soon also overgrown. In contrast, a 20-metre (66 ft) obelisk was erected in Demmin's burnt center to commemorate Soviet soldiers who had died in the area. The local museum listed "2,300 deaths due to warfare and famine" for the years of 1945 and 1946. As late as 1989, the chronicle of the district's Communist party blamed the destruction of the town on Werwolf and Hitler Youth activities. The atrocities were blamed on "Germans disguised as Soviets" by a document found in the local Soviet military administration in Neubrandenburg. As Der Spiegel puts it:

Arbitrary executions, the rapes, the torching of towns – the atrocities of the Red Army were a taboo in the GDR, the mass suicides as well. Those who had witnessed it all or even survived a suicide attempt – children, elderly, raped women – were ashamed and kept quiet. Somehow, life had to go on in the system of the liberators. Today, many do not want to remember, for too long they had struggled to find a balance between what they had suffered and what they had learned.

Only a few East German documents mentioned the events. The first post-war district official (Landrat) of Demmin, who was confirmed in this position by the Soviet authorities on 15 May 1945, briefly mentioned the events in an internal "activity report" of 21 November, speaking of more than 700 suicide victims. Dieter Krüger, eyewitness of the events, son of a raped mother and survivor of a failed family suicide, started researching the mass suicide while working for the local museum in the 1980s, but his work was confiscated. Historian Erla Vensky managed to "smuggle" a line about a "panic, in the course of which 700 people committed suicide" into the "History of the local workers' movement".

After the collapse of the East German government, some of the eyewitnesses, including Demmin's current chronicler, Zimmer, "broke the silence" and made their account of the mass suicide public. A new memorial was dedicated at the site of the mass graves. A dedicated issue of a journal published by the state of Mecklenburg-Vorpommern was released in 1995. Since then, accounts of the event have been published by German media. In 2008, the mass suicide was a theme of a novel.

== Similar mass suicides ==
Mass suicides occurred all along the late-war Soviet-German front line. Examples are:

- Neubrandenburg: more than 600 suicides
- Burg Stargard: 120 suicides
- Neustrelitz: 681 suicides
- Penzlin: 230 suicides
- Tessin: 107 suicides
- Vietzen and Rechlin: mass suicide by drowning in Lake Müritz
- Teterow, Güstrow, Rostock, Bad Doberan: hundreds of suicides each
- Malchin more than 500 suicides, buried in a mass grave
- Schönlanke (now Trzcianka): about 500 suicides
- Stolp (now Słupsk): about 1000 suicides
- Lauenburg (now Lębork): about 600 suicides
- Grünberg (now Zielona Góra): about 500 suicides
- Berlin: more than 4,000 suicides in April and May, including mass suicides
