= Mass suicides in Nazi Germany =

German suicides at the end of World War II

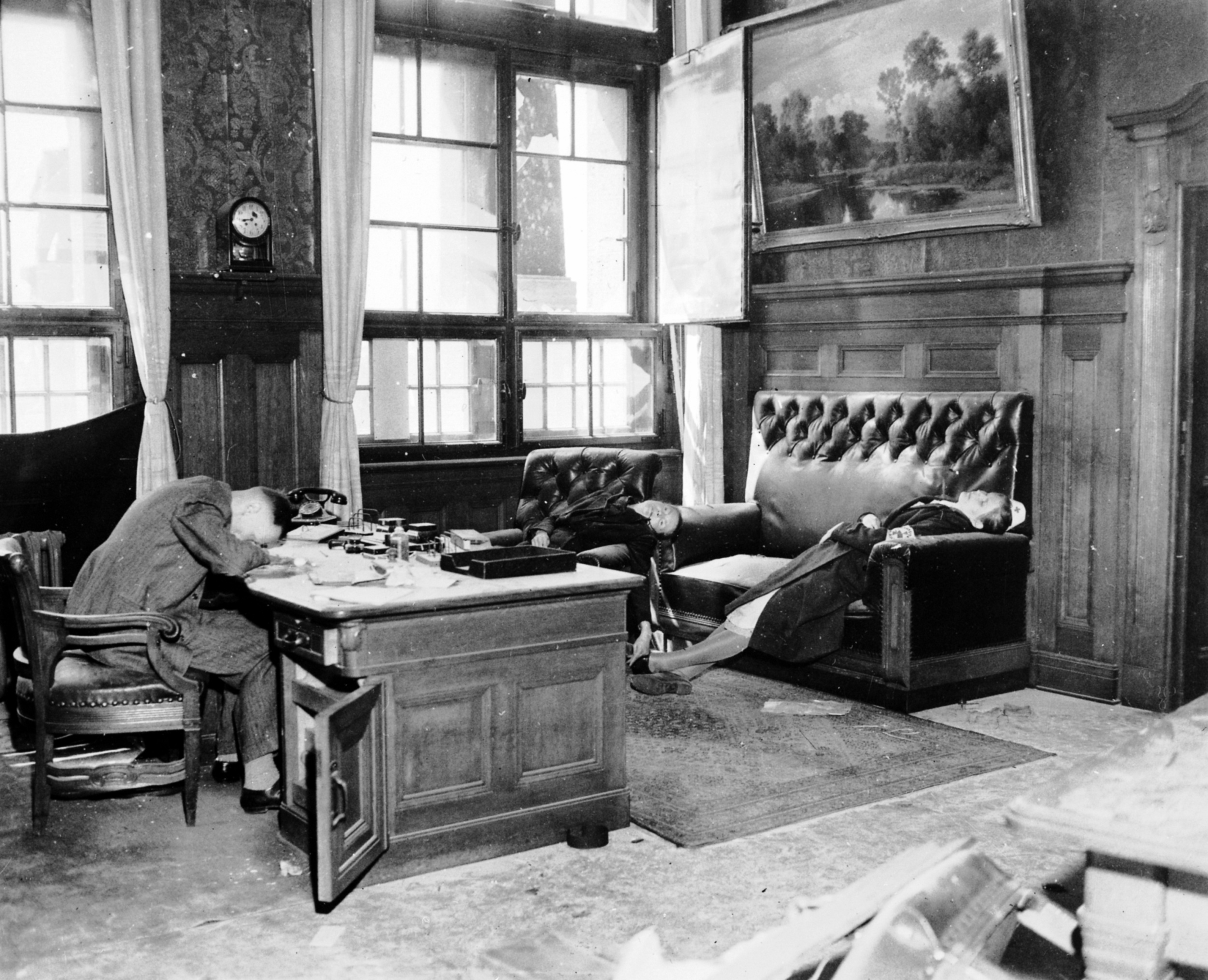
The Deputy Mayor of Leipzig and his wife and daughter, dead of suicide in the Neues Rathaus as U.S. troops were entering the city on 20 April 1945

During the final weeks of Nazi Germany and World War II in Europe, many civilians, government officials, and military personnel throughout Germany and German-occupied Europe committed suicide. In addition to Adolf Hitler and many high-ranking Nazi officials like Joseph Goebbels, Heinrich Himmler, and Philipp Bouhler, others chose suicide rather than accept the defeat of Germany. Motivating or triggering factors included fears of execution for Nazi war crimes or reprisals and atrocities by the Allies and the Soviets, Nazi propaganda glorifying suicide as preferable to defeat, and despondency after Hitler's suicide. For example, in May 1945, up to 1,000 people killed themselves in a mass suicide in the German town of Demmin, before and after the entry of the Red Army. In Berlin alone more than 7,000 suicides were reported in 1945.

Periods of suicides have been identified between January and May 1945 when thousands of German people took their own lives. Life magazine reported that: "In the last days of the war the overwhelming realization of utter defeat was too much for many Germans. Stripped of the bayonets and bombast which had given them power, they could not face a reckoning with either their conquerors or their consciences." German psychiatrist Erich Menninger-Lerchenthal noted the existence of "organised mass suicide on a large scale which had previously not occurred in the history of Europe [...] there are suicides which do not have anything to do with mental illness or some moral and intellectual deviance, but predominantly with the continuity of a heavy political defeat and the fear of being held responsible."

== Overview ==
=== Reasons ===
There were several reasons some Germans decided to end their lives in the last months of the war. First, by 1945, Nazi propaganda had created fear among some sections of the population about the impending military invasion of their country by the Soviets or Western Allies. Information films from the Reich Ministry of Public Enlightenment and Propaganda repeatedly chided audiences about why Germany must not surrender, telling the people they faced the threat of torture, rape, and death in defeat. These fears were not groundless, as many Germans were raped. The number of rapes is disputed, but was certainly considerable – hundreds of thousands of incidents, according to most Western historians.

Secondly, many Nazis had been indoctrinated in unquestioning loyalty to the party and with it its cultural ideology of preferring death over living in defeat. Finally, others killed themselves because they knew what would happen to them following defeat. The Soviets, Americans, and the British had made it clear in 1943, with the Moscow Declarations, that all those considered war criminals would face judgment, leading to execution or life sentences. Many party officials and military personnel were, therefore, aware they would face severe punishment for their conduct during the war.

Suicides happened in three successive waves:

- The first phase began in early January 1945, when Soviet forces drove Germany back to its territories in East Prussia and Silesia.
- The second phase occurred in April and May when numerous Nazi Party officials and senior military personnel committed suicide. Suicide levels reached their maximum in Berlin in April 1945 when 3,881 people killed themselves during the Battle of Berlin. It was in this phase that Adolf Hitler and Joseph Goebbels took their lives, along with their respective wives. Magda Goebbels also murdered her children (by giving them crushed cyanide tablets) at the same time.
- The final phase occurred after the takeover of Germany by the Allies, primarily in the territories occupied by the Red Army, often in response to widespread rape and looting by Soviet soldiers (cf. mass suicide in Demmin).

The scale of the suicide waves suggests that fear and anxiety were common motivations. There were also a large number of family suicides or murder-suicides where mothers and fathers killed themselves and their children.

=== Methods ===
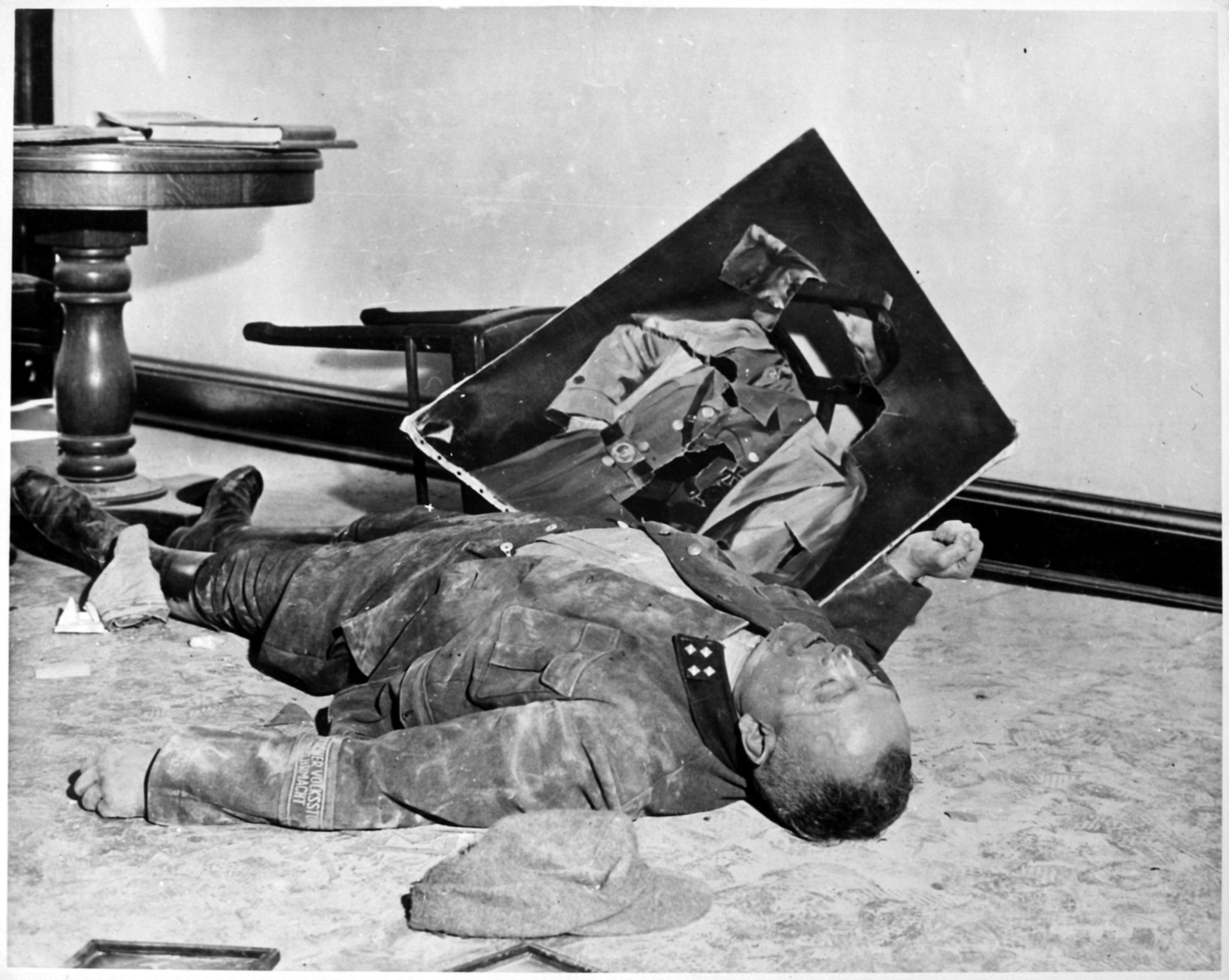
The body of Volkssturm Bataillonsführer Walter Dönicke lying next to a torn portrait of Adolf Hitler. Dönicke committed suicide in the Neues Rathaus in Leipzig on 19 April 1945, shortly before the arrival of U.S. troops.

In March 1945, as part of Operation Periwig, the British printed a German-language black propaganda postcard, supposedly issued by the fictitious anti-Nazi "Red Horse" resistance movement, and giving detailed instructions on how to hang oneself with the minimum amount of pain. The professed goal of this group was the execution of high-ranking Nazi functionaries. In order to draw more attention to this goal among the German population, agents were commissioned to place this horse symbol on various buildings or objects while postcards were sent to prominent Germans containing threatening texts and showing the Red Horse symbol. When the recipients were asked to commit suicide, the hidden meaning was, that this was more honourable than being liquidated by the resistance group.

Cyanide capsules were one of the most common ways that people killed themselves in the last days of the war. On 12 April 1945, members of the Hitler Youth distributed cyanide pills to audience members during the last concert of the Berlin Philharmonic. Prior to his own suicide in the Führerbunker, Hitler ensured all his staff had been given poison capsules.

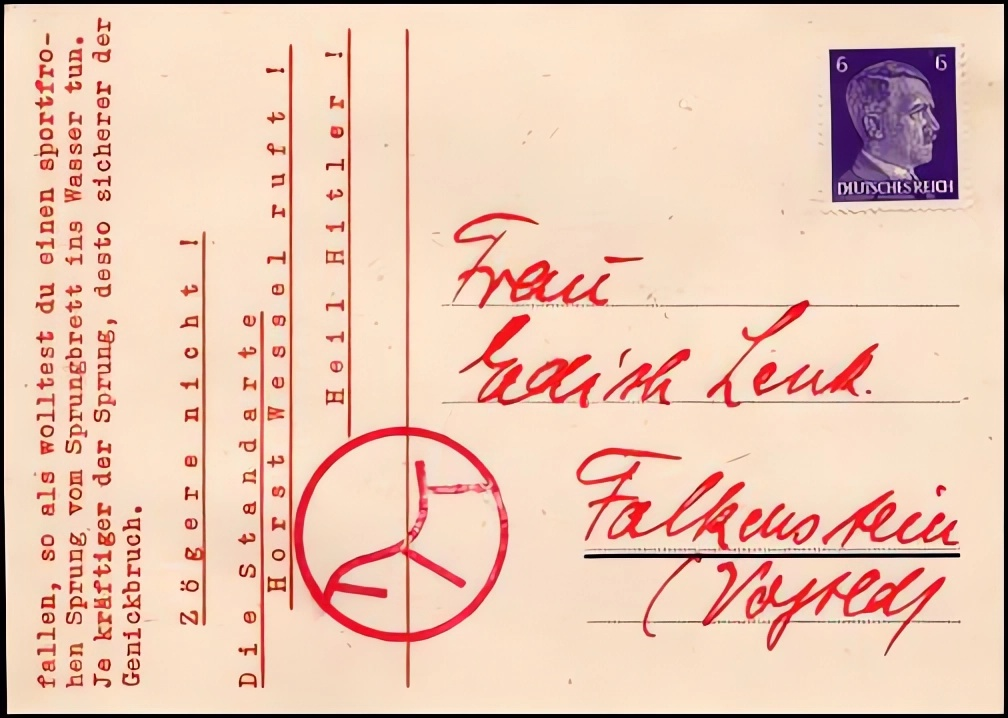
Propaganda postcard sent in the context of Operation Periwig, calling for the suicide of the recipient

Many German civilians would go into forests to hang themselves and their families in areas which were soon to be invaded by the Red Army, while others would use poison instead. There are also numerous documented cases where parents killed their children before they killed themselves.

Members of the German Armed Forces often used firearms to end their lives. For example, SS-Obergruppenführer Ernst-Robert Grawitz killed himself and his family with an Eierhandgranate, while Wehrmacht generals Wilhelm Burgdorf and Hans Krebs shot themselves in the head with their pistols, and Josef Terboven, the Reichskommissar for German-occupied Norway, blew himself up in a bunker by detonating 50 kg (110 lb) of dynamite.

=== Number of suicides and locations ===
More than 7,057 suicides were reported in Berlin in 1945, but it is thought that many went unreported due to the chaos of the post-war period. Other locations where suicides happened include:

- Neubrandenburg: more than 600 suicides
- Burg Stargard: 120 suicides
- Neustrelitz: 681 suicides
- Penzlin: 230 suicides
- Tessin: 107 suicides
- Vietzen and Rechlin: mass suicide by drowning in Lake Müritz
- Teterow, Güstrow, Rostock, Bad Doberan: hundreds of suicides each
- Malchin more than 500 suicides, buried in a mass grave
- Schönlanke (now Trzcianka): about 500 suicides
- Stolp (now Słupsk): about 1,000 suicides
- Lauenburg (now Lębork): about 600 suicides
- Grünberg (now Zielona Góra): about 500 suicides
- Berlin: 7,057 during 1945

== State encouragement ==
The willingness to commit suicide before accepting defeat was a key Nazi idea during the Second World War. Adolf Hitler declared his preference for death over defeat in a speech he gave to the Reichstag during the invasion of Poland in 1939, saying, "I now wish to be nothing other than the first soldier of the German Reich. Therefore I have put on that tunic which has always been the most holy and dear to me. I shall not take it off again until after victory is ours, or I shall not live to see the day!"

When it became apparent that the Nazis were about to lose the war, Germany's leaders (including Hitler and Goebbels) spoke publicly in favor of suicide as an option. Hitler declared on 30 August 1944 during a military briefing, "It's only [a fraction] of a second. Then one is redeemed of everything and finds tranquility and eternal peace." Many supporters of Nazi ideology and party shared the apocalyptic message of National Socialism and looked forward to ending their lives. Years of exposure to Nazi propaganda also led many Germans to assume that suicide was the only way out.

The glorification of violent death is believed to have originated with the post-World War I Nazi struggle for power and the early deaths of Nazi activists such as Horst Wessel. In the same way, the suicides of leading Nazis were meant to be seen as heroic sacrifices. In a radio speech on 28 February 1945 (circulated in most newspapers in the Reich on 1 March), Goebbels declared on public radio that, if Germany were to be defeated, he would "cheerfully throw away his life" as Cato the Younger did. On 28 March of the same year, the Nazi newspaper Völkischer Beobachter published an article titled "Risk of One's Life" by Wilhelm Pleyer, which called on Germans to fight to the death.

The suicidal atmosphere was enhanced by the Nazis' report of numerous Soviet mass graves and other atrocities committed by the NKVD and the Red Army towards the end of the war. A Nazi leaflet distributed in February 1945 in Czech territories warned German readers about the "Bolshevik murderer-pack" whose victory would lead to "incredible hatred, looting, hunger, shots in the back of the neck, deportation, and extermination" and appealed to German men to "save German women and girls from defilement and slaughter by the Bolshevik bloodhounds." These fears, and the portrayal of "Soviet Bolsheviks" as sub-human monsters, led to a number of mass suicides in eastern Germany. One female clerk in the city of Schönlanke within Pomerania said, "Out of fear of these animals from the east, many Schönlankers ended their lives. (Around 500 of them.) Whole families were wiped out in this way." The fear of Soviet occupation was so great that even people living far from Soviet lines, including a pensioner in Hamburg, killed themselves in fear of what Soviet soldiers would do to them. The behavior of Soviet troops also played a role, as many Germans committed suicide to avoid rape or out of shame at having been raped. In addition, many suicides are believed to have occurred due to depression caused or exacerbated by living in a war zone among ruins.

== Notable suicides ==
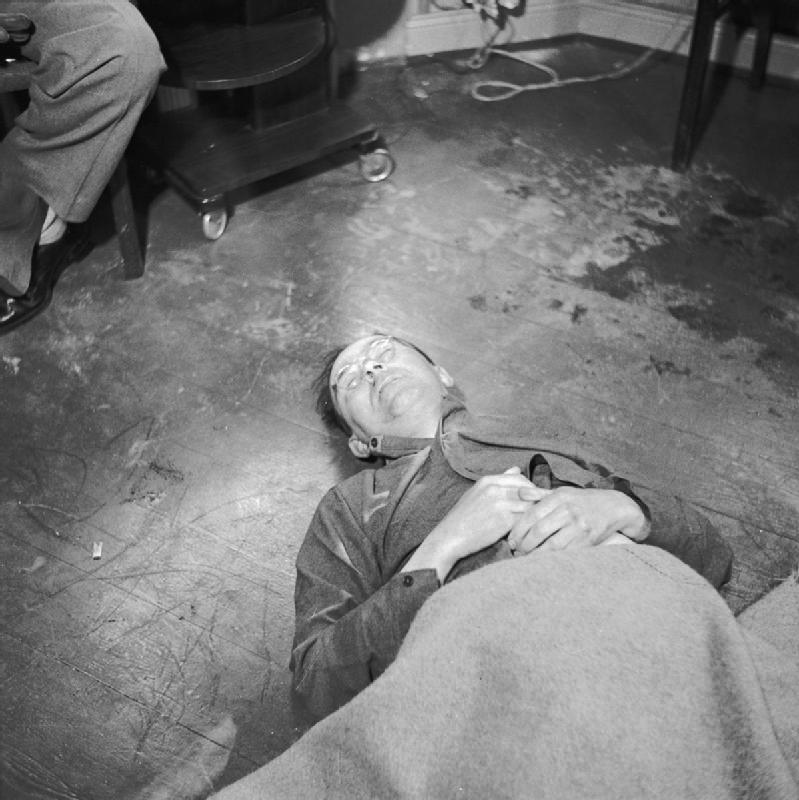
Heinrich Himmler after his suicide by ingesting cyanide in Allied custody, May 1945

Many prominent Nazis, Nazi followers, and members of the armed forces committed suicide during the last days of the war. Others killed themselves after being captured. The list includes 8 out of 41 NSDAP regional leaders who held office between 1926 and 1945, 7 out of 47 higher SS and police leaders, 53 out of 554 army generals, 14 out of 98 Luftwaffe generals, 11 out of 53 admirals in the Kriegsmarine, and an unknown number of junior officials.

== See also ==
- Banzai Cliff
- Better dead than red
- Nero Decree
- Suicide Cliff

== Sources ==
- Christian Goeschel (2009). Suicide in Nazi Germany. Oxford University Press. ISBN 978-0-19-953256-8.
- Lowe, Keith (2013). Savage Continent Europe in the Aftermath of World War Two. London: Penguin Books Ltd. p. 55-61. ISBN 9780141034515.
- Richard Bessel, Alf Lüdtke, Bernd Weisbrod. No man's land of violence: extreme wars in the 20th century, Wallstein Verlag 2005, ISBN 3892448256
- Richard Bessel Nazism and War Modern Library 2006
- David R. Beisel "The German Suicide, 1945." The Journal of Psychohistory 34 (2007)
