= Walter Dönicke =

German Nazi Party politician (1899 – 1945)

Oberbürgermeister of Leipzig
- In office 12 October 1937 – 11 October 1938
- Preceded by: Rudolf Haake (acting)
- Succeeded by: Rudolf Haake (acting)

Kreishauptmann, Kreishauptmannschaft Leipzig
- In office October 1933 – 11 October 1937
- Preceded by: Kurt von Burgsdorff
- Succeeded by: Kurt von Burgsdorff

Additional positions
- 1933: President, Landtag of Saxony

Personal details
- Born: Kurt Walter Dönicke; 27 July 1899 Eisenach, Grand Duchy of Saxe-Weimar-Eisenach, German Empire
- Died: 19 April 1945 (aged 45) Leipzig, Free State of Saxony, Nazi Germany
- Cause of death: Suicide
- Party: Nazi Party
- Occupation: Carpenter

Military service
- Allegiance: German Empire
- Branch/service: Royal Saxon Army
- Years of service: 1917–1918
- Unit: Infantry Regiment 107 (8th Royal Saxon), 58th Infantry Division (5th Royal Saxon)
- Battles/wars: World War I

Kurt Walter Dönicke (27 July 1899 – 19 April 1945) was a German Nazi Party official and politician who became the Oberbürgermeister of Leipzig in Nazi Germany. Removed from office in 1938, he committed suicide in the last days of the Second World War when the city fell to the US Army.

== Early life ==
Walter Dönicke was born in Eisenach, the son of a foreman. In 1902, his family moved to Leipzig. After attending the local Volksschule and the municipal trade school, he was apprenticed in the carpentry trade from 1914 to 1917. From 1917 to 1918, he served on the western front in the First World War with the Royal Saxon Army's Infantry Regiment 107 (8th Royal Saxon), part of the 58th Infantry Division (5th Royal Saxon). After his discharge from the military at the end of the war, Dönicke worked as a carpenter's assistant until 1929.

== Nazi Party career ==
On 20 July 1925, Dönicke joined the Nazi Party (membership number 11,133). He attended the Party's public speaking school and, on 6 July 1926, became the Ortsgruppenleiter (local district leader) in Leipzig. On 1 April 1927, he advanced to Kreisleiter (district leader) and, in May 1929, he was elected to the Landtag of Saxony, the state parliament. Between 1932 and 1933, he was a city councilor in Leipzig. Following the Nazi seizure of power in 1933, he became the president of the Landtag until its dissolution in October 1933. He was also named a Staatskommissar for the Kreishauptmannschaft Leipzig (the regional government administrative district) and then was made the Kreishauptmann a position analogous to Regierungspräsident, holding this post until October 1937.

Dönicke was a member of several Nazi organizations, including the National Socialist Flyers Corps (NSFK), the Reichsluftschutzbund, the National Socialist People's Welfare and the Sturmabteilung (SA), in which he attained the rank of SA-Standartenführer in SA-Gruppe Sachsen on 9 November 1936.

=== Oberbürgermeister ===
Following the resignation of Leipzig's Oberbürgermeister Carl Friedrich Goerdeler on 31 March 1937, the position was initially held on an acting basis by his deputy, Rudolf Haake. On 12 October 1937, Dönicke was appointed to the position by Reichsminister of the Interior Wilhelm Frick. Dönicke's term in office saw the designation of Leipzig as the "Reich Trade Fair City" (20 December 1937), the start of construction of the Lindenau harbor (27 May 1938) and the opening of Leipzig's first trolleybus line (29 July 1938). During Dönicke's tenure, the city administration also intensified its antisemitic measures by initiating the Aryanization of real estate and housing, displacing and expropriating Leipzig's Jewish residents.

=== Dismissal ===
Dönicke's predecessor and eventual successor, Haake, successfully intrigued against Dönicke by undermining him and reporting on his shortcomings to the Nazi Party leadership. In addition, Dönicke made himself personally unpopular with Adolf Hitler. During Hitler's last official visit to Leipzig on 26 March 1938, Dönicke presented him with a supposedly original autographed score of Richard Wagner's opera, Tannhäuser although this was merely a lithographic facsimile. In addition, Dönicke delivered his welcoming speech in a heavy Upper Saxon dialect, which Hitler later parodied to his inner circle. Hitler concluded that Dönicke was not suited to the demands of the office. Dönicke was unsuccessful in his bid to be placed on the electoral list for the 10 April 1938 Reichstag election. On 11 October 1938, he was removed as Oberbürgermeister and from his other state and Party posts.

== Death ==
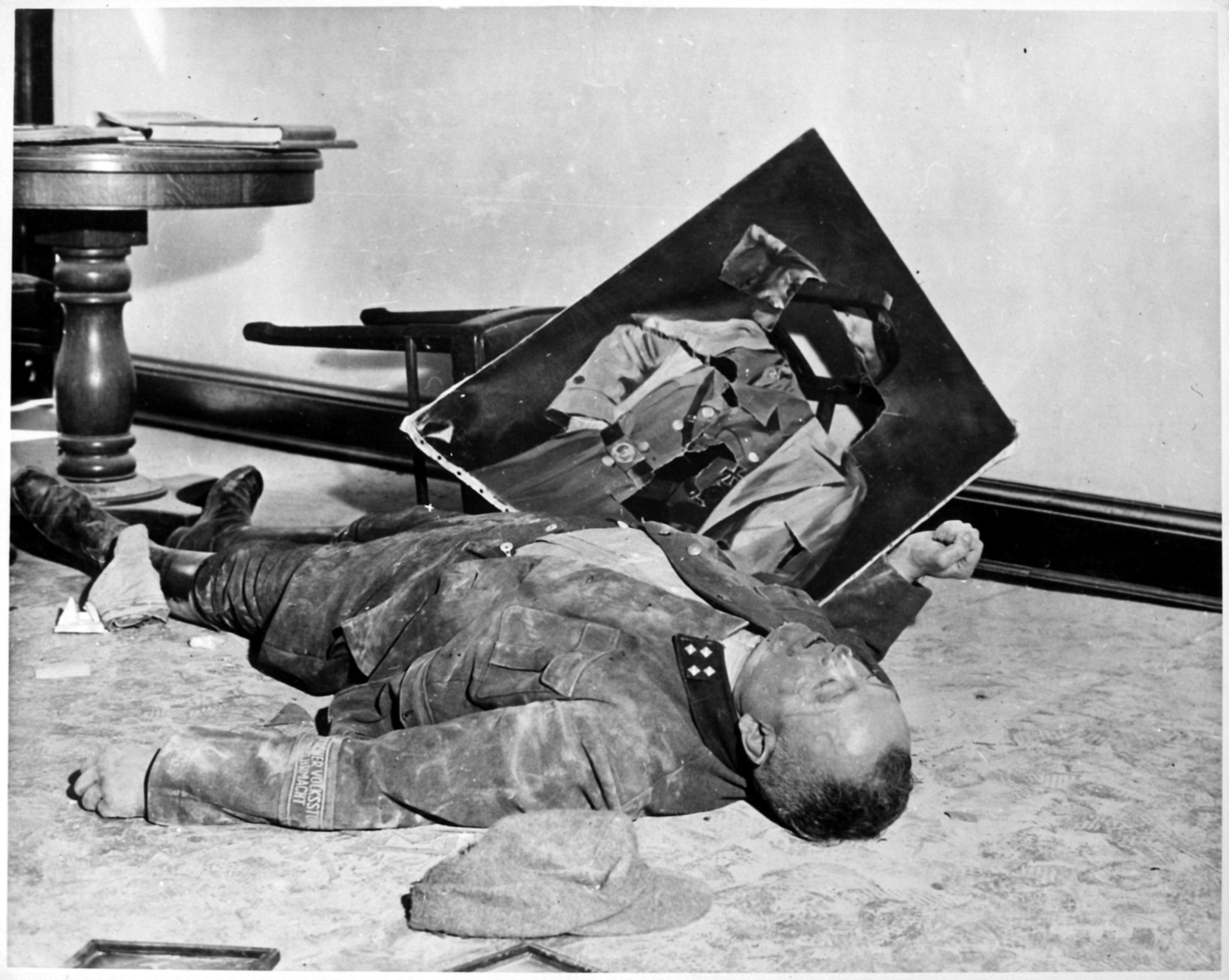
Dönicke's body after his suicide in Leipzig's New Town Hall on 19 April 1945

Toward the end of the Second World War, the US Army assaulted Leipzig on 18 April 1945 and the beleaguered city surrendered the next day. Serving as a Bataillonsführer in the Volkssturm, the Nazi Party militia, Dönicke took his own life with a gunshot in the New Town Hall, together with Deputy Kreisleiter Willy Wiederroth and the local SA commander, SA-Oberführer Carl Strobel.
