= Der Stahlhelm, Bund der Frontsoldaten =

German revanchist veteran's association

- The logo of the organization

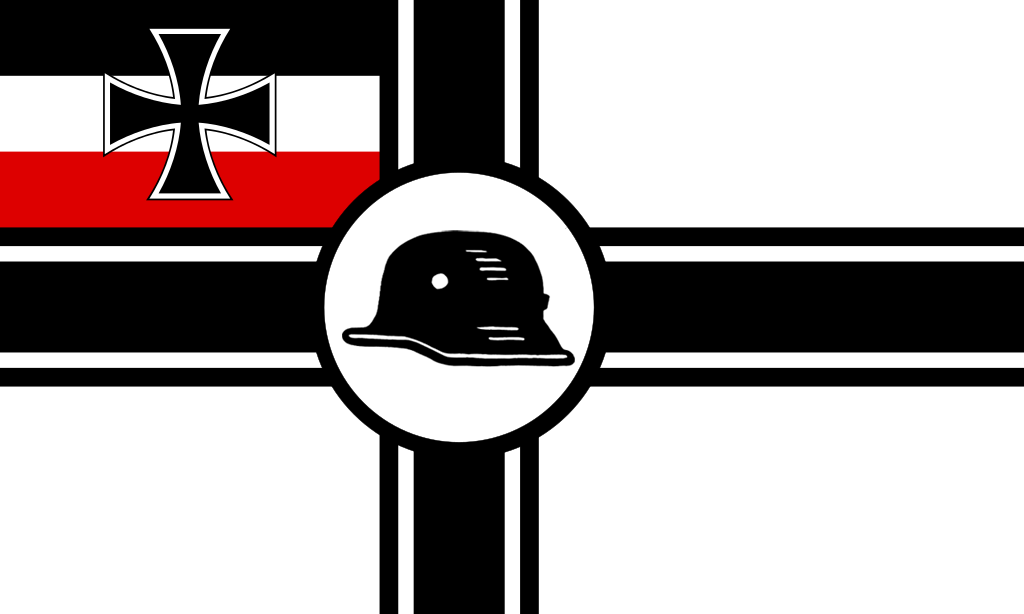
- Original flag of the organization
- Named after: Stahlhelm
- Merged into: Sturmabteilung
- Successor: Der Stahlhelm – Kampfbund für Europa (1951–2000)
- Formation: 25 December 1918; 107 years ago
- Founder: Franz Seldte
- Founded at: Magdeburg
- Dissolved: 7 November 1935; 91 years ago (as Nationalsozialistischer Deutscher frontkämpfer-Bund (Stahlhelm))
- Type: Ex-servicemen's organization
- Purpose: Maintain peace and order and foster comradeship founded in the field.
- Headquarters: Thuringia
- Origins: End of World War I and the German Revolution of 1918
- Region served: Weimar Republic (1918–1933); Nazi Germany (1933–1935)
- Members: 1,500,000 (1933 est.)
- Federal Leader: Franz Seldte
- Deputy Leader: Theodor Duesterberg
- Key people: August von Mackensen
- Publication: Der Stahlhelm; Die Standarte
- Subsidiaries: Jungstahlhelm; Ringstahlhelm; Scharnhorst; Stahlhelm-Landsturm
- Affiliations: Deutschnationale Volkspartei

Der Stahlhelm, Bund der Frontsoldaten (German: 'The Steel Helmet, League of Front-Line Soldiers'), commonly known as Der Stahlhelm ('The Steel Helmet'), was a revanchist ex-serviceman's association formed in Germany after the First World War. The group claimed inspiration from Italian fascism, and excluded Jewish veterans. However, they supported a restoration of the Hohenzollern monarchy, distinguishing themselves from the Nazi Party. As such, their clubs were eventually suppressed in Nazi Germany. After the Second World War, a Stahlhelm network was re-established in West Germany. Following a history of supporting fringe nationalist parties, the last functioning local association dissolved itself in 2000.

== History ==
=== Weimar Republic (1918–1933) ===
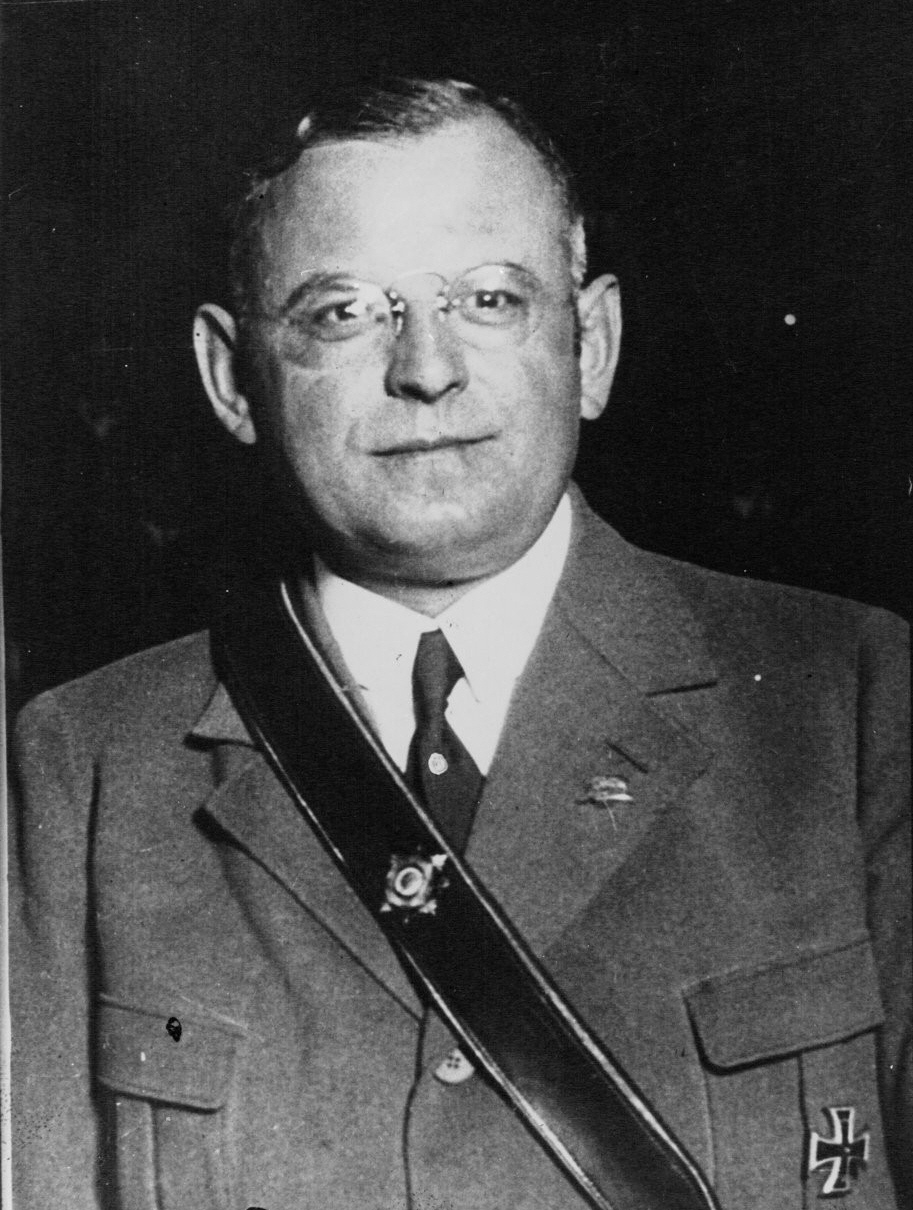
Franz Seldte in 1933

Der Stahlhelm was formed on 25 December 1918 in Magdeburg, Germany, by the factory owner and First World War–disabled reserve officer Franz Seldte. After the 11 November armistice, the Army had been split up and the newly established German Reichswehr, according to the Treaty of Versailles, was to be restricted to no more than 100,000 men. Similar to the numerous Freikorps, which upon the Revolution of 1918–1919 were temporarily backed by the Council of the People's Deputies under Chancellor Friedrich Ebert, Der Stahlhelm ex-servicemen's organization was meant to form a paramilitary organization.

The league was a rallying point for revanchist and nationalistic forces from the beginning. Within the organization a worldview oriented toward the prior imperial regime and the Hohenzollern monarchy predominated, many of its members promoting the stab-in-the-back legend (Dolchstosslegende), the charge that the democratic politicians who had accepted the Kaiser's abdication and sued for peace had betrayed an undefeated German army. Its journal, Der Stahlhelm, was edited by Count Hans-Jürgen von Blumenthal, later hanged for his part in the 20 July plot of 1944. Financing was provided by the Deutscher Herrenklub, an association of German industrialists and business magnates with elements of the East Elbian landed gentry (Junker). Jewish veterans were denied admission and formed a separate Reichsbund jüdischer Frontsoldaten.

After the failed Kapp Putsch of 1920, the organization gained further support from dissolved Freikorps units. In 1923 the former DNVP politician Theodor Duesterberg joined Der Stahlhelm, becoming Seldte's deputy and leadership rival. In 1923, Stahlhelm units were actively involved in the formally passive resistance struggle of paramilitary formations against the French occupation of the Ruhr area. These units were responsible for numerous acts of sabotage on French trains and military posts. One of the volunteers operating in the Ruhr area was Paul Osthold, who headed the German Institute for Technical Work Training (DINTA) in the 1930s and became one of the leading representatives of German employers' associations in the Federal Republic of Germany. From 1924 on, in several subsidiary organizations, veterans with front line experience as well as new recruits would provide a standing armed force in support of the Reichswehr beyond the 100,000 men allowed. With 500,000 members in 1930, the league was the largest paramilitary organization of Weimar Republic. In the 1920s Der Stahlhelm received political support from Fascist Italy's Duce Benito Mussolini.

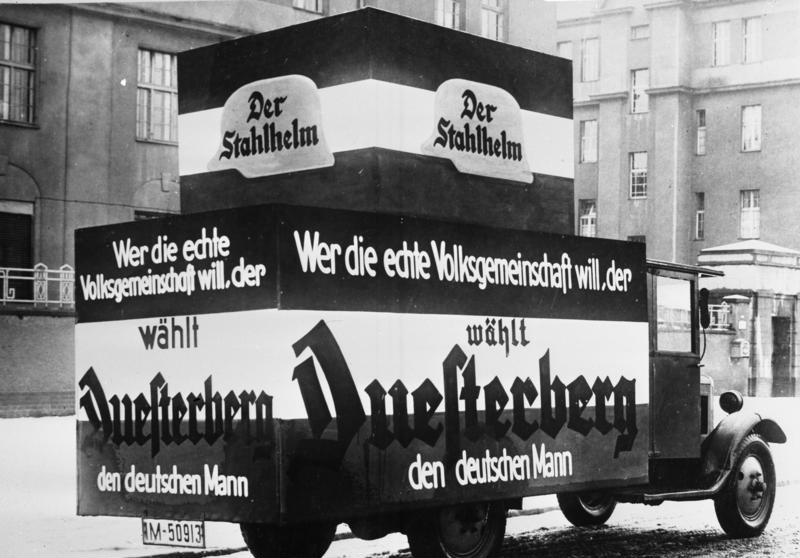
Der Stahlhelm propaganda car in Berlin promoting DNVP nominee Theodor Duesterberg for president of the German Reich in the 1932 election

Although Der Stahlhelm was officially a non-party entity and above party politics, after 1929 it took on an anti-republican and anti-democratic character. Its goals were a German dictatorship, the preparation of a revanchist program, and the direction of local anti-parliamentarian action. For political reasons its members distinguished themselves from the Nazi Party (NSDAP) as "German Fascists". Among their further demands were the establishment of a Greater Germanic People's Reich, struggle against Social Democracy, the "mercantilism of the Jews" and the general liberal democratic worldview, and attempted without success to place candidates favorable to the politics of a renewed expansion to the East.

In 1929 Der Stahlhelm supported the "Peoples' Initiative" of DNVP leader Alfred Hugenberg and the Nazis to initiate a German referendum against the Young Plan on World War I reparations. In 1931 they proposed another referendum for the dissolution of the Prussian Landtag. After both these referendums failed to reach the 50% necessary to be declared valid, the organization in October 1931 joined another attempt of DNVP, NSDAP and Pan-German League to form the Harzburg Front, a united right-wing campaign against the Weimar Republic and Chancellor Heinrich Brüning. However, the front soon broke up and in the first round of the 1932 German presidential election, Theodor Duesterberg ran as Der Stahlhelm candidate against incumbent Paul von Hindenburg and Adolf Hitler. Facing a massive Nazi campaign reproaching him with having Jewish ancestry he only secured 6.8% of the votes cast.

=== Nazi Germany (1933–1935) ===
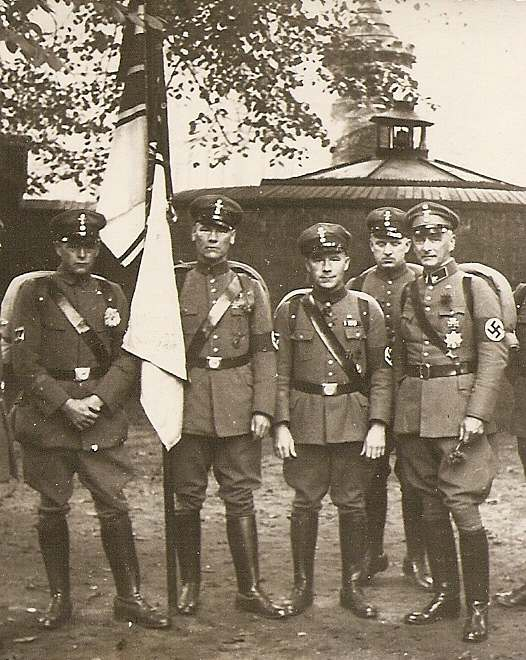
Der Stahlhelm in uniform, c. 1934

After the Nazi seizure of power on 30 January 1933, the new authorities urged for a merger into the party's Sturmabteilung (SA) paramilitary organization. Seldte joined the Hitler Cabinet as Reich Minister for Labour, prevailing against Duesterberg. Der Stahlhelm still tried to keep its distance from the Nazis, and in the run-up to the German federal election of 5 March 1933 formed the united conservative "Black-White-Red Struggle Front" (Kampffront Schwarz-Weiß-Rot) with the DNVP and the Agricultural League, reaching 8% of the votes.

Flag of Der Stahlhelm under the authority of the Nazi SA, 1933-1935

On 27 March 1933, the SA attempted to disarm Stahlhelm members in Braunschweig, who under the command of Werner Schrader had forged an alliance with scattered republican Reichsbanner forces. The violent incident initiated by Nazi Minister Dietrich Klagges and later called Der Stahlhelm Putsch was characteristic of the pressure applied by the Nazis on Der Stahlhelm in this period, mistrusting the organization due to its fundamentally monarchist character. In April Seldte applied for membership in the NSDAP and also joined the SA, from August 1933 in the rank of an Obergruppenführer.

On 27 April 1933, Seldte had officially declared Der Stahlhelm subordinate to Hitler's command. The attempts by the Nazis to integrate Der Stahlhelm succeeded in 1934 in the course of the "voluntary" Gleichschaltung (English: Synchronization) process: the organization was renamed Nationalsozialistischer Deutscher frontkämpfer-Bund (Stahlhelm) (English: National Socialist German Combatants' Federation (Stahlhelm)) (NSDFBSt) while large parts were merged into the SA as Wehrstahlhelm, Reserve I and Reserve II contingents.

The remaining NSDFBSt local groups were finally dissolved by decree of Adolf Hitler on 7 November 1935. Seldte's rival Duesterberg was interned at Dachau concentration camp upon the Night of the Long Knives at the beginning of July 1934, but released soon after.

=== Postwar association ===
In 1951, Der Stahlhelm e. V. was re-founded as a registered association in Cologne, under the patronage of field marshal Albert Kesselring. Active in the right-wing extremist scene, it later became "The Stahlhelm – Association of Front Soldiers - Combat League for Europe" (Der Stahlhelm e. V. – Bund der Frontsoldaten – Kampfbund für Europa) with a central training center in Jork, Lower Saxony. Members of Chancellor Konrad Adenauer's Christian Democratic Union and of the liberal Free Democrats recognised the association as a legitimate part of an anti-Communist Cold War coalition. However, from the end of the 1950s, as the association began to organize itself in an explicitly paramilitary manner, mainstream politicians withdrew their support. Many meetings were banned because members wore uniforms.

In the 1960s and 70s, as membership declined, the association identified increasingly with nationalist political parties including the German People's Union (Deutsche Volksunion) and the National Democratic Party of Germany (NPD). In the 1980s, many members joined the banned Hoffman Military Sports group (Wehrsportgruppe Hoffmann). Negative press reports about the demonstrations against the Wehrmacht exhibition, weapons finds, and various criminal investigations, accompanied a further disintegration of the organisation. In 2000, the last functional group, in Jork, dissolved itself.

== Ranks and insignia ==
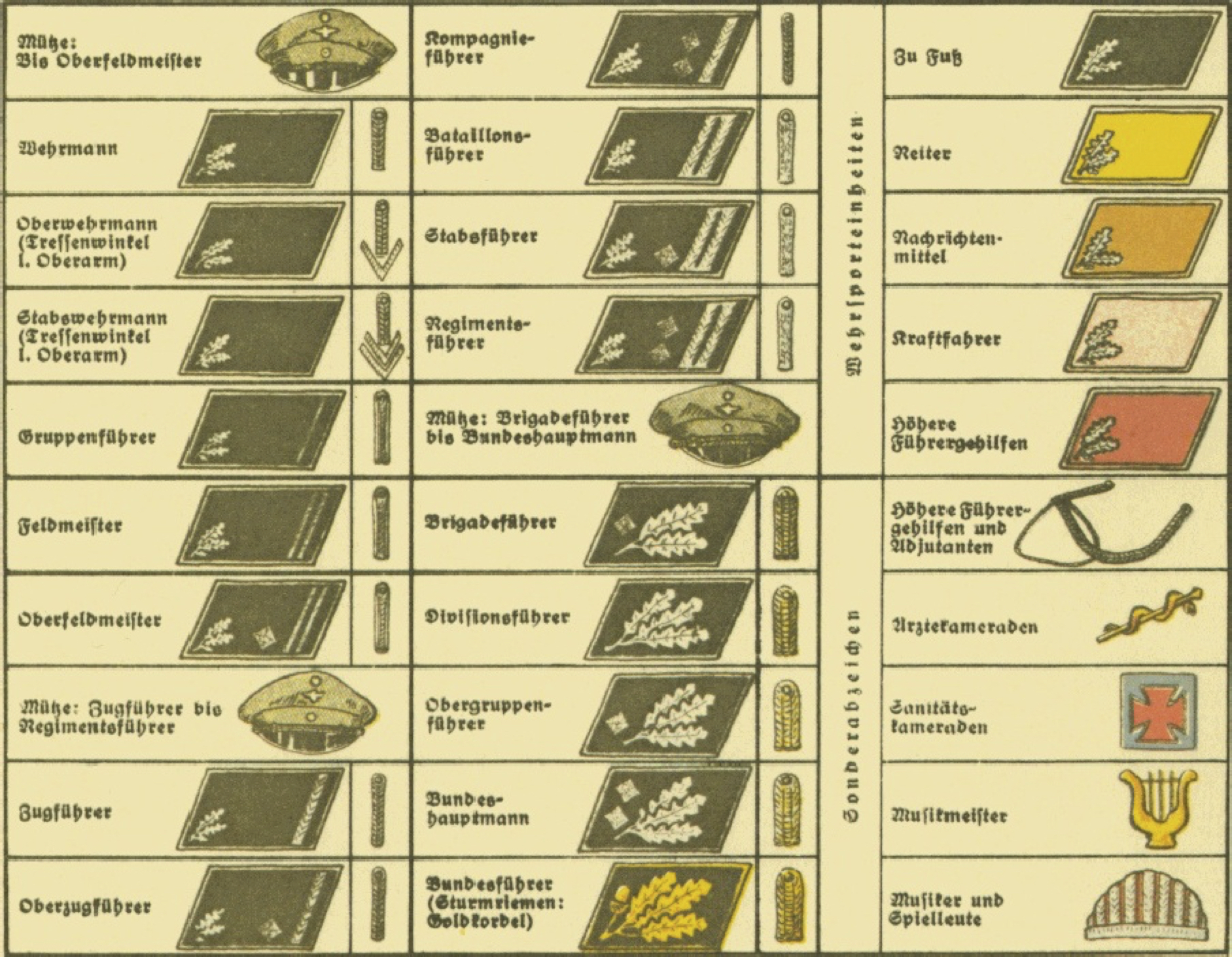
Rank insignia, 1933

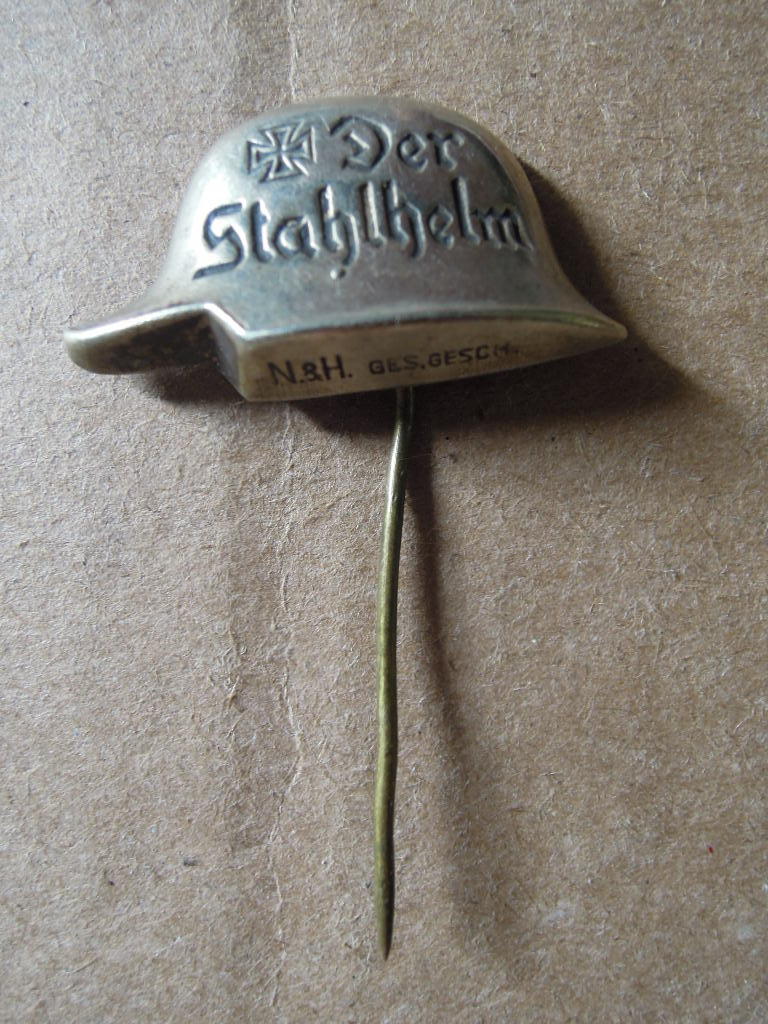
Der Stahlhelm lapel pin, 1918–1933

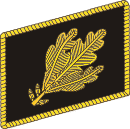
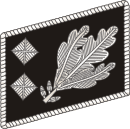
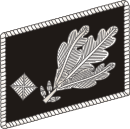
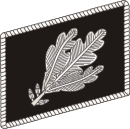
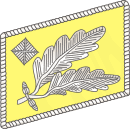
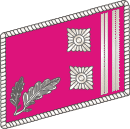
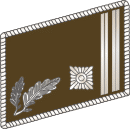
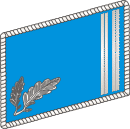
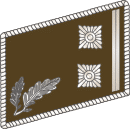
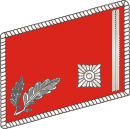
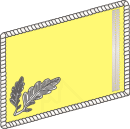
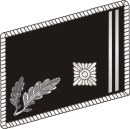
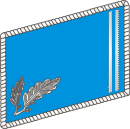
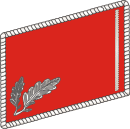
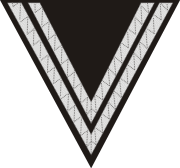
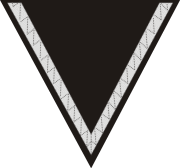
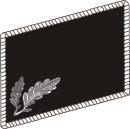
Collar insignia	Shoulder insignia	Ranks
		Bundesführer
		Bundeshauptmann
		Obergruppenführer
		Divisionsführer
		Brigadeführer
		Regimentsführer
		Stabsführer
		Bataillonsführer
		Kompanieführer
		Oberzugführer
		Zugführer
		Oberfeldmeister
		Feldmeister
		Gruppenführer
		Stabswehrmann
		Oberwehrmann
		Wehrmann

== See also ==
- Weimar paramilitary groups
