= Paul Osthold =

German political scientist (1894–1978)

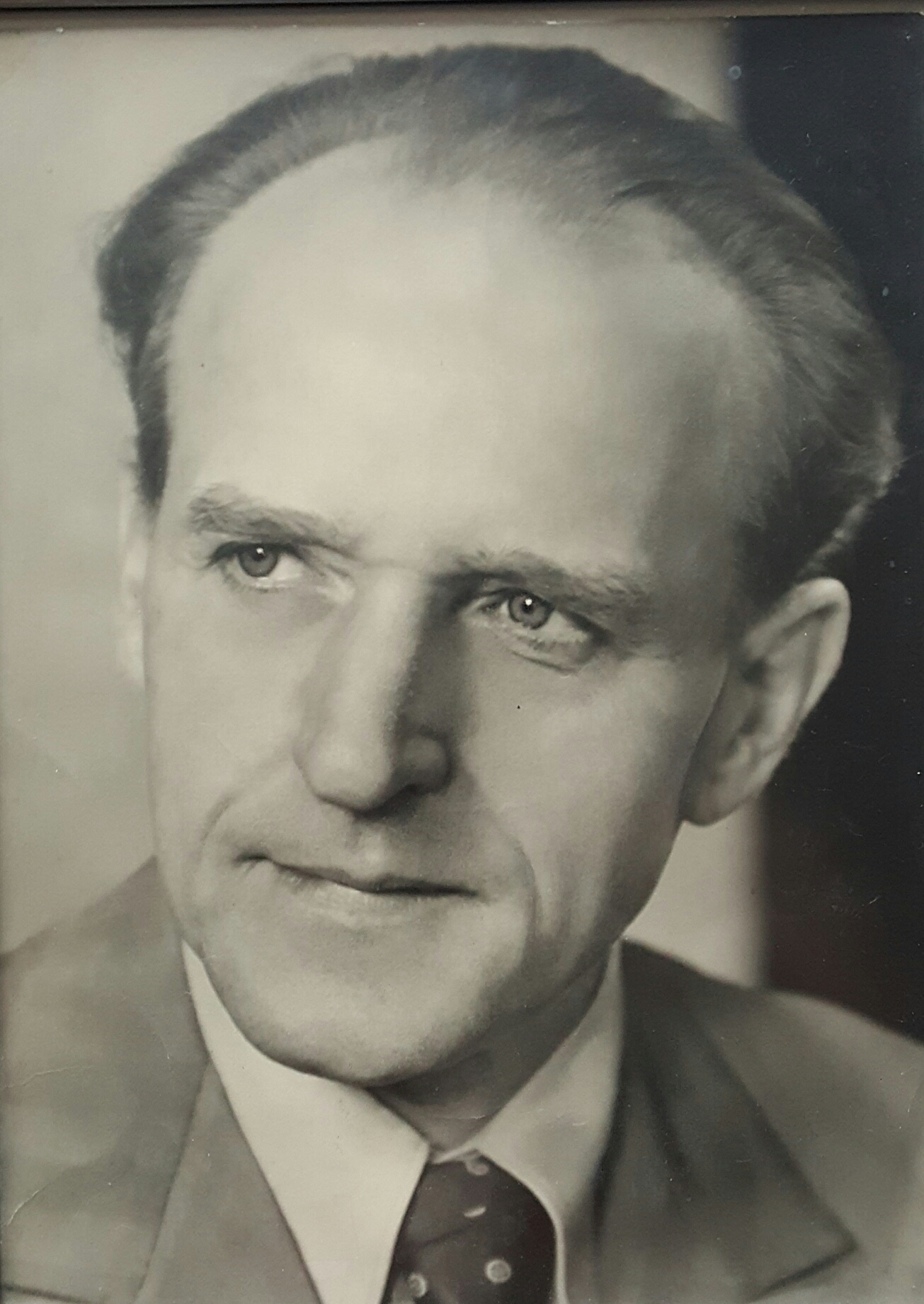
- Osthold in 1951
- Born: 11 June 1894; Hagen, Germany
- Died: 17 September 1978 (aged 84); Wissen, Germany

Paul Osthold (11 June 1894 – 17 September 1978) was a German political scientist. In addition to his work as managing director of the German Institute for Technical Work Training (DINTA), Osthold also worked as editor-in-chief and publisher of the magazines "Der deutsche Volkswirt" and "Der Arbeitgeber", which he shaped into one of the leading socio-political magazines in the Federal Republic of Germany in the 1950s. As a representative of the employers' associations, Osthold was also in close contact with well-known personalities from politics and business. In 1964, Osthold was awarded the Great Cross of Merit of the Federal Republic of Germany for his services in the field of economics and for his commitment to the interests of German employers' associations.

== Life and professional career ==
=== Weimar Republic (1918–1933) ===
After the end of World War I, which he experienced between 1914 and 1917 as a lieutenant, awarded the Iron Cross First Class (EK I), first on the Eastern Front, and later until his captivity in April 1917 in France, Osthold began studying political science in Königsberg in 1921. Before he received his doctorate in political science in 1926 in Münster with a thesis on the relationship between Marxist socialism and German state thought in World War I, Osthold had been heavily involved in the German national movement in addition to his professional activity. As a member of the Stahlhelm, which was known to be closely related to the DNVP, he had inter alia participated in the Ruhrkampf. Here he belonged to the underground resistance against the French occupation forces until the end of 1923, which was also supported by members of the Freikorps. After the end of the Ruhr struggle, Osthold went into politics, where he became involved in the DNVP founded by Alfred Hugenberg. In the election for the Reichstag in May 1924, from which the party emerged as the second strongest force with 19.5 percent, he narrowly failed to enter parliament. In the rest of the Weimar period, Osthold worked primarily as managing director of DINTA. In this function he wrote the popular work "The Struggle for the Soul of Our Worker" in 1926, which historians consider the institute's political manifesto and a continuation of Chancellor Hans Luther's considerations on the "Influence of modern large-scale economy on religion" from 1925. Osthold's much acclaimed work is characterized above all by the author's preference for the economic forms and industrial relationships established in the United States, which Osthold sought to transfer to Germany.

=== Nazi Germany (1933–1945) ===
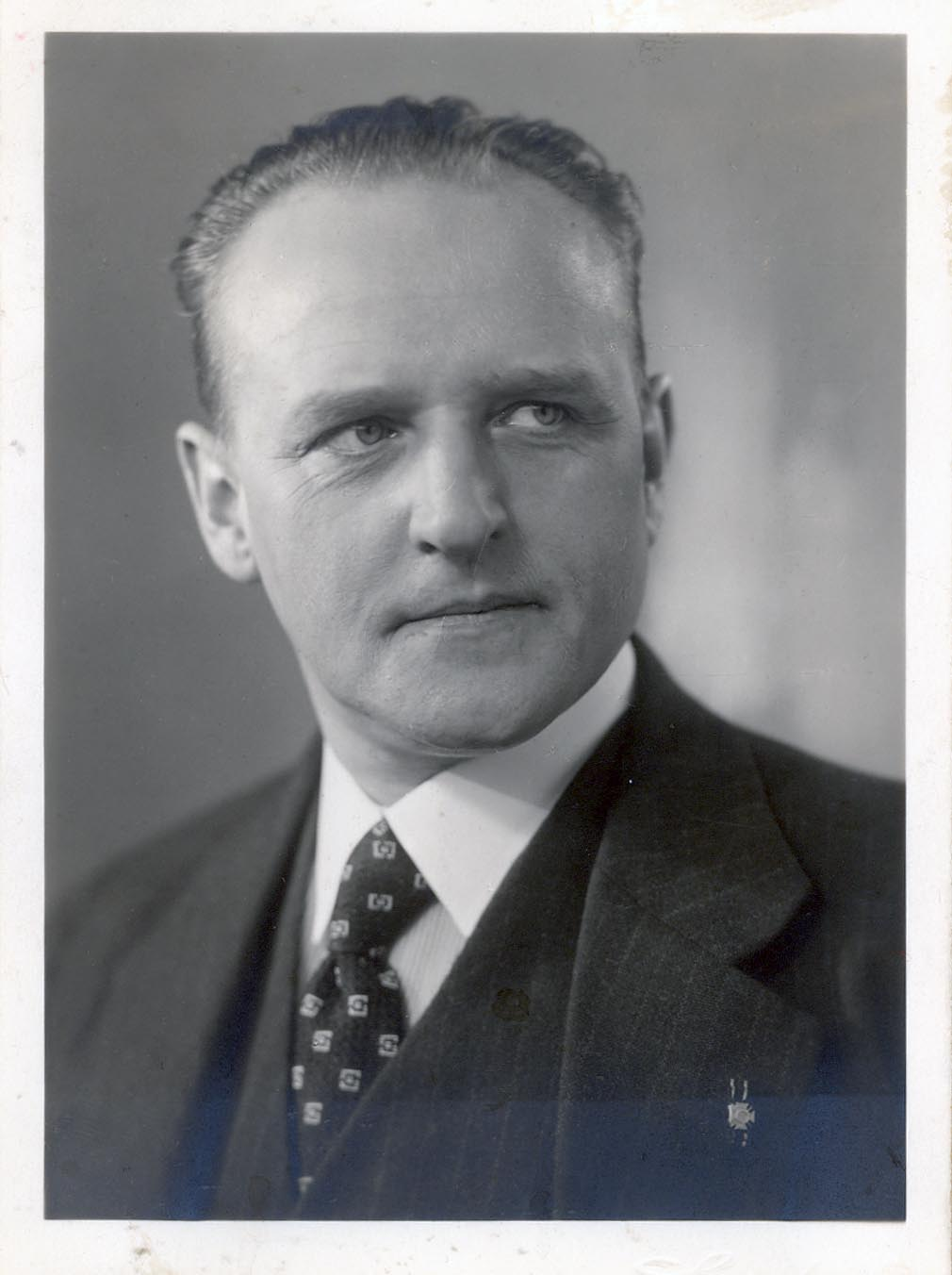
Paul Osthold – candidate for the Reichstag elections of May 4, 1924

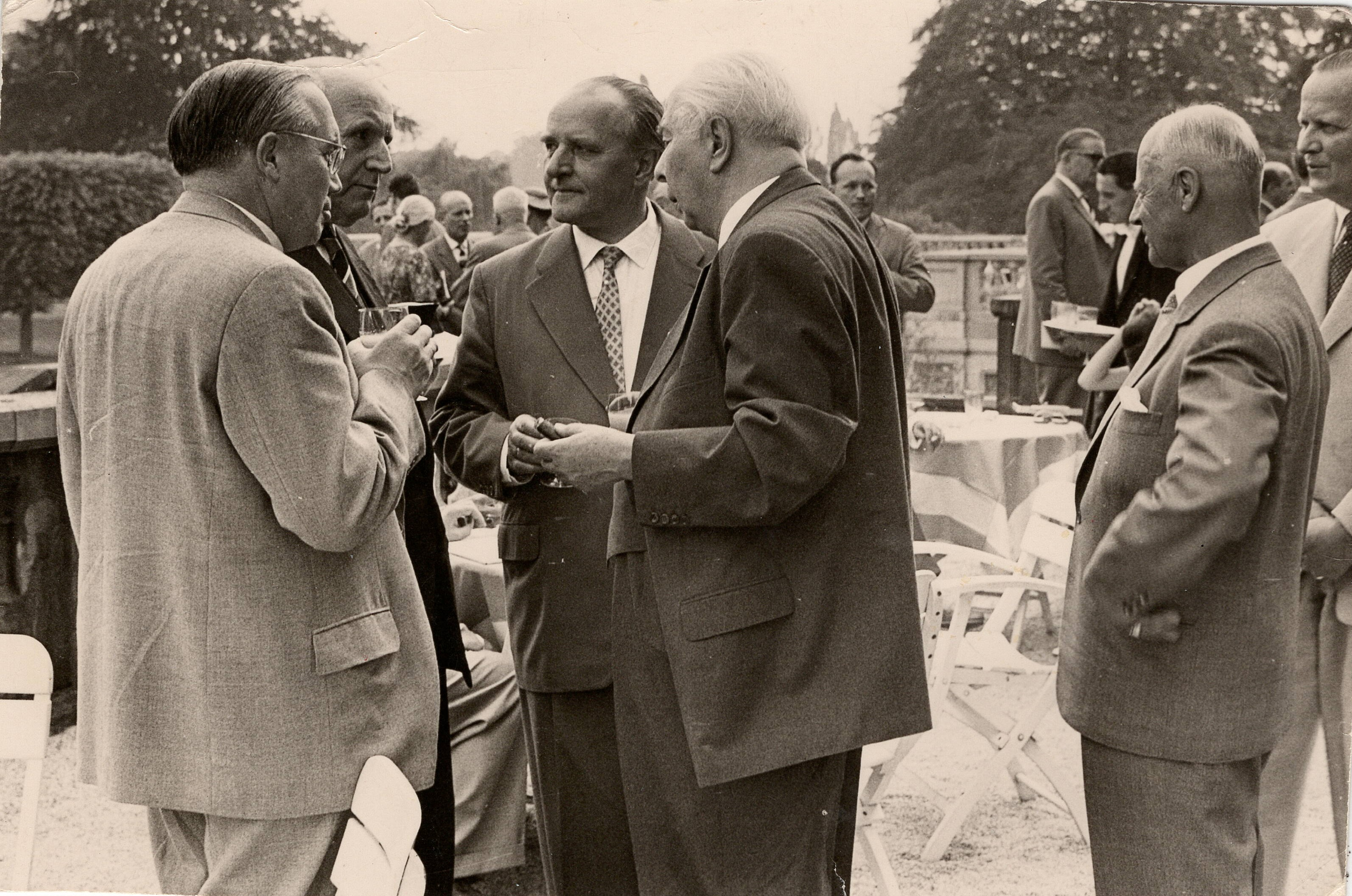
Paul Osthold (center) in a confidential conversation with Federal President Theodor Heuss (right).

After DINTA was renamed "German Institute for National Socialist Technical Work Training" by the National Socialists in 1933 and robbed of its original influence, Osthold was appointed editor-in-chief of the magazine "Der deutsche Volkswirt" and was able to represent the interests of German employers in this function until 1945. Due to his ideological attachment to German national ideas and his resulting rejection of communism, the National Socialists finally became aware of Osthold. In 1933, various party officials tried to persuade him to join the NSDAP. Since Osthold did not give in to these advances, however, as a decorated officer in the Imperial Army, at the beginning of 1934 he received a notice of being drafted into a reserve association of the SA. Since Osthold categorically refused such engagement, he left after a short time, whereupon he came into the crosshairs of the authorities. This conflict reached increasingly threatening proportions in the period that followed. In autumn of 1934 an article finally appeared in the newspaper "Der Stürmer", the author of which warned an unspecified "Dr. O." that before he knew it, a "night of long knives" could be in store for him as well. Despite this public threat, which made an obvious allusion to the liquidation of almost the entire SA leadership in the context of the "Röhm putsch", Osthold did not join the NSDAP or any of its branches until the end of the war. As it turned out after its end, between 1933 and 1945 Osthold had not only regularly criticized the domestic and foreign policy of the National Socialists, but was also opposed to the exclusion of Jewish people. Although Osthold did not actively oppose the NSDAP during this time, he did use his networks several times to support those who were politically persecuted by the Nazi regime. He had repeatedly used his private fortune for this purpose. In addition to Friedrich Curtius, the group of beneficiaries included, above all, prominent social democrats, including Julius Hadrich, who later became a member of the State of Berlin, Heinrich Tröger, who later became vice-president of the Bundesbank, and Ernst Nölting, who later became Minister of Economics in Lower Saxony. In addition to these people, Osthold later also paid tribute to liberals such as the journalist Franz Reuter for his commitment. In January 1945 Osthold was assigned to a unit of the 12th Army as a company commander. In this formation he was initially involved in the Battle of Berlin, but was able to move west in time, where he went into American custody in May 1945.

=== Federal Republic of Germany (1949–1978) ===
After the end of the war, Osthold quickly made a career as an editor and publicist. He was one of the founders of the magazine "Der Arbeitgeber", the central organ of the Confederation of German Employers' Associations (BDA). As its editor-in-chief, he wrote more than 200 leading articles until his retirement in 1964. These highly regarded contributions, which Osthold, because of their scientific clarity and their convincing expressiveness, earned respect and recognition in broad circles of the professional world, at universities, but also among the political institutions of the Federal Republic, contained statements on fundamental social and sociopolitical issues which in their entirety established a documentation of social policy in the early and late post-war period. Under Osthold's aegis, "Der Arbeitgeber" advanced to one of the leading socio-political journals in the Federal Republic of Germany in the 1950s, with a high reputation at home and abroad. In a farewell speech on the occasion of his retirement, Osthold wrote:

"For decades I had observed the intersections in the relevant nations where the forces triggered by the idea, economy and state crossed, increased or weakened. All of my essays in this journal were based on this broad field of experience, and it was from them that I tried to understand and justify the necessities of our day. This applies to developments in our own country as well as to those between peoples. This applies in particular to the tireless clarification of the historically so bitterly confirmed fact that every law, every company, every state treaty, in short all acts that are significant for the life of the peoples, which are not through an economically stable, politically up-to-date organized, socially balanced and morally healthy one Society, remain completely unpredictable in terms of duration and effect. Today one cannot write history at any level, at least that of constitutional law, without not taking into account the fateful influence that economic developments have on the social order and on the political forces discharged in the formal state organs."

Gerhard Erdmann, managing director of the BDA from 1949 to 1963, later honored Osthold as a "publicist of the German economy, unaffected by the political upheavals of that time". During his time as editor-in-chief, Osthold maintained close personal contacts with influential people from politics and business, including Federal President Theodor Heuss, employer president Hans Constantin Paulssen and vice-president of the Bundesbank Heinrich Tröger. In 1964, Osthold was awarded the Federal Cross of Merit of the Federal Republic of Germany of in Cologne for his services in the field of economics and the interests of German employers' associations. Paul Osthold is the grandfather of the historian and publicist Christian Paul Osthold.

== Works ==
- Der Mensch im Betrieb: Das Alters- und Invalidenwerk der Gelsenkirchener Bergwerks A. G. Abtlg. Schalke (Vereinigte Stahlwerke, Schalker Verein). Düsseldorf: Industrieverlag. 1926.
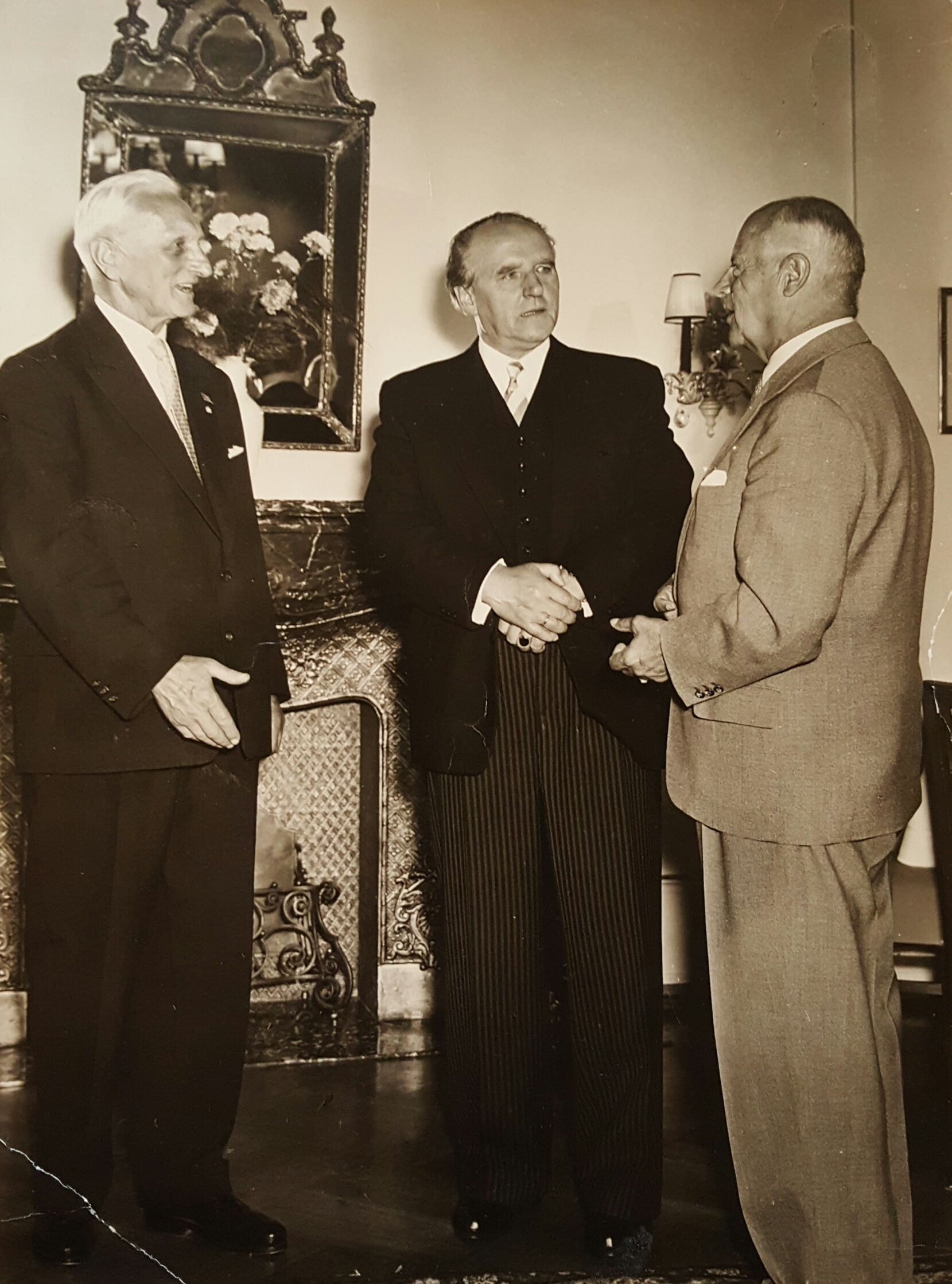
- Paul Osthold at the award ceremony of the Great Federal Cross of Merit of the Federal Republic of Germany in 1964 in Cologne.
  Das Verhältnis des marxistischen Sozialismus zum deutschen Staatsgedanken im Weltkriege unter Berücksichtigung seiner Entwicklung in der Vorkriegszeit. Staatswissenschaftliche Dissertation. Münster. 1926.
- Industrielle Menschenführung als Begriff. Essen: W. Girardet. 1928.
- Der Kampf um die Seele unseres Arbeiters: Gedanken zu den Manifest des Reichskanzlers Dr. Luther an der Stockholmer Kirchenkonferenz und Wege ihrer praktischen Durchführung. Düsseldorf: Industrie-Verlag u. Druckerei. 1929.
- Die Schuld der Sozialdemokratie: Die Zerstörung von Staat und Wirtschaft durch den Marxismus. Berlin: Verlag für Zeitkritik. 1932.
- Die Geschichte des Zechenverbandes 1908–1933: Ein Beitrag zur deutschen Sozialgeschichte. Berlin: Elsner Verlagsgesellschaft. 1934.
- Wehrwirtschaft als staatsorganisatorisches Problem; in: Jahrbuch für Wehrpolitik und Wehrwissenschaften (1937/38), S. 125–154
- Englands Ernährungssicherung im Kriege. Dt. Ges. für Wehrpolitik und Wehrwissenschaften, 1938, Als Ms. gedr.
- Die internationale Arbeiterbewegung und der Wehrgedanke; in: Wissen und Wehr (1939), S. 536–548.
- Die Wehrwirtschaft der großen Demokratien; in: Wissen und Wehr (1939), S. 181–202.
- Das Koordinationsproblem in der englischen Kriegswirtschaft; in: Der deutsche Volkswirt, Bd. 15 (1940/41), S. 732–734.
- Kanada, Arsenal des Empire?; in: Der deutsche Volkswirt. Berlin 1940.
- Englands Landwirtschaft kann nicht helfen. Berlin: Deutsche Gesellschaft für Wehrpolitik und Wehrwissenschaften. 1940.
- England an der Schwelle der Entscheidung. Berlin: Deutsche Gesellschaft für Wehrpolitik und Wehrwissenschaften. 1940.
- Effekten gegen Dollar. Berlin: Deutsche Gesellschaft für Wehrpolitik und Wehrwissenschaften. 1940.
- Der Einsatz der Ausländer im Reich; in: Wehrtechnische Monatshefte, Bd. 46 (1942), S. 181–184.
- Die deutsche Kriegswirtschaft im ersten Weltkrieg und heute; in: Wehrtechnische Monatshefte, Bd. 46 (1942), S. 229–236.
- Roosevelt zwischen Spekulation und Wirklichkeit: Grundlagen und Methoden der anglo-amerikanischen Rüstungsgemeinschaft. Berlin: Mittler. 1943.
- Die sozialpolitische Linie in USA; in: Arbeitgeber (1950), 24, S. 102–104.
- Der Preis für den Sozialismus : Labours Sozialbilanz; in; Arbeitgeber (1950), 5, S. 14–19
- Zur öffentlichen Auseinandersetzung um die unternehmerische Wirtschaft. Düsseldorf : Rechtsverl., 1951.
- Mitbestimmung und gerechter Lohn als Elemente einer Neuordnung der Wirtschaft : ein Gespräch. Duisburg : Duisburger Kupferhütte, (1951).
- Situation und Aufgabe des Unternehmertums. Köln: Deutsches Industrieinstitut. 1952.
- Beiträge zur sozialpolitischen Auseinandersetzung der Gegenwart : Gerhard Biskup, Paul Osthold, Franz Spiegelhalter. München : Isar Verl., 1953.
- Eisenhowerʹs Wirtschafts- und Finanzprogramm; in: Arbeitgeber, Bd. 6 (1954), 4, S. 156–159.
- Wirtschaft und Politik im 20. Jahrhundert. Köln: Deutsche Industrieverlagsgesellschaft. 1957.
- Zu Besuch in Schweden; in: Arbeitgeber, Bd. 9 (1957), 18, S. 614ff.
- Um die unsterbliche Würde der Person : zu den sozialen Enzykliken der Päpste; in: Arbeitgeber, Bd. 13 (1961), 15/16, S. 482–490.
- Rückblick auf den Januar 1933; in: Der Arbeitgeber. 1963, S. 45–47.
- Zu Kennedys drittem Bundesbudget; in: Arbeitgeber, Bd. 15 (1963), 3, S. 66–69.
- Volkseinkommen in den USA unter der Lupe : eine Untersuchung des Survey of Current Business; in: Arbeitgeber, Bd. 16 (1964), 19, S. 498–500.
