= Bataillonsführer =

German paramilitary title for battalion commanders

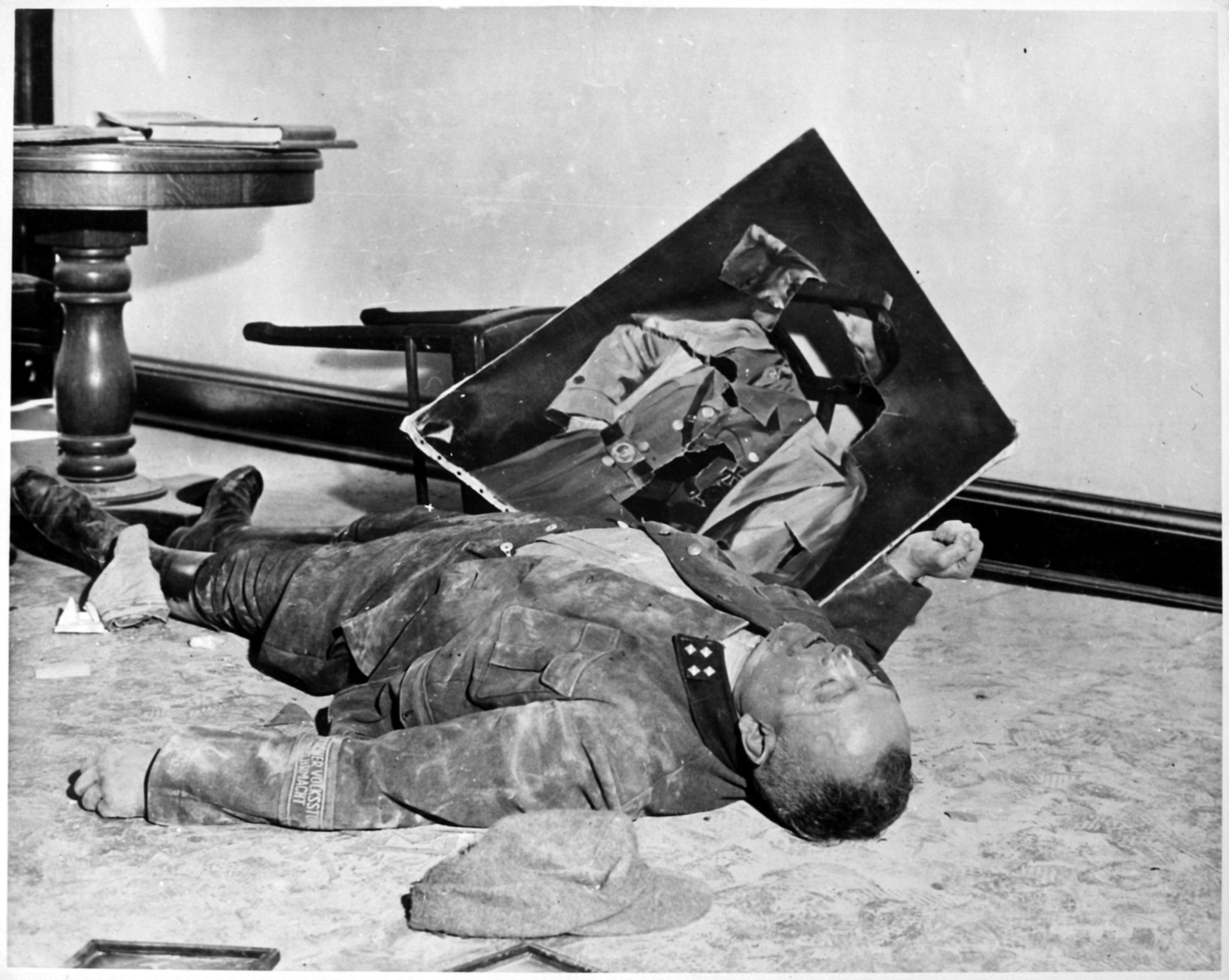
Famous photograph of Volkssturm-Bataillonsführer Walter Dönicke, who committed suicide in Leipzig on 19 April 1945; note the four pips on his gorget patch.

Bataillonsführer (battalion leader) is a German paramilitary title that has existed since the First World War. Originally, the title of Bataillonsführer was held by the officer commanding an infantry battalion (most often a Major). After the close of World War I, the title became one of several paramilitary ranks in the Freikorps.

The last usage of Bataillonsführer, as a paramilitary title, was in 1945 when the position was held by battalion commanders of Volkssturm units.
