= New Town Hall (Leipzig) =

Seat of the Leipzig city administration

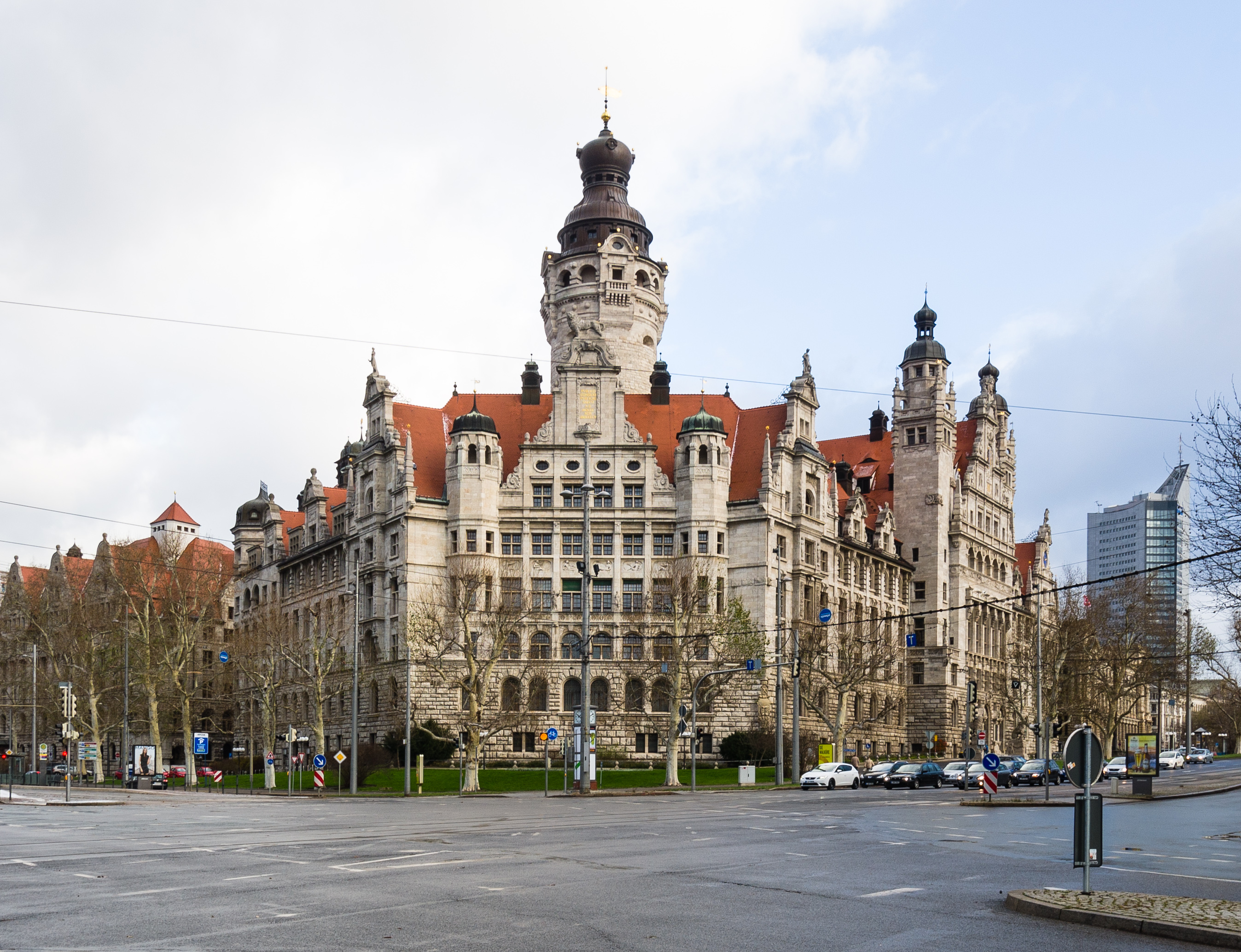
The tower of Leipzig's New Town Hall is the tallest city hall tower in Germany

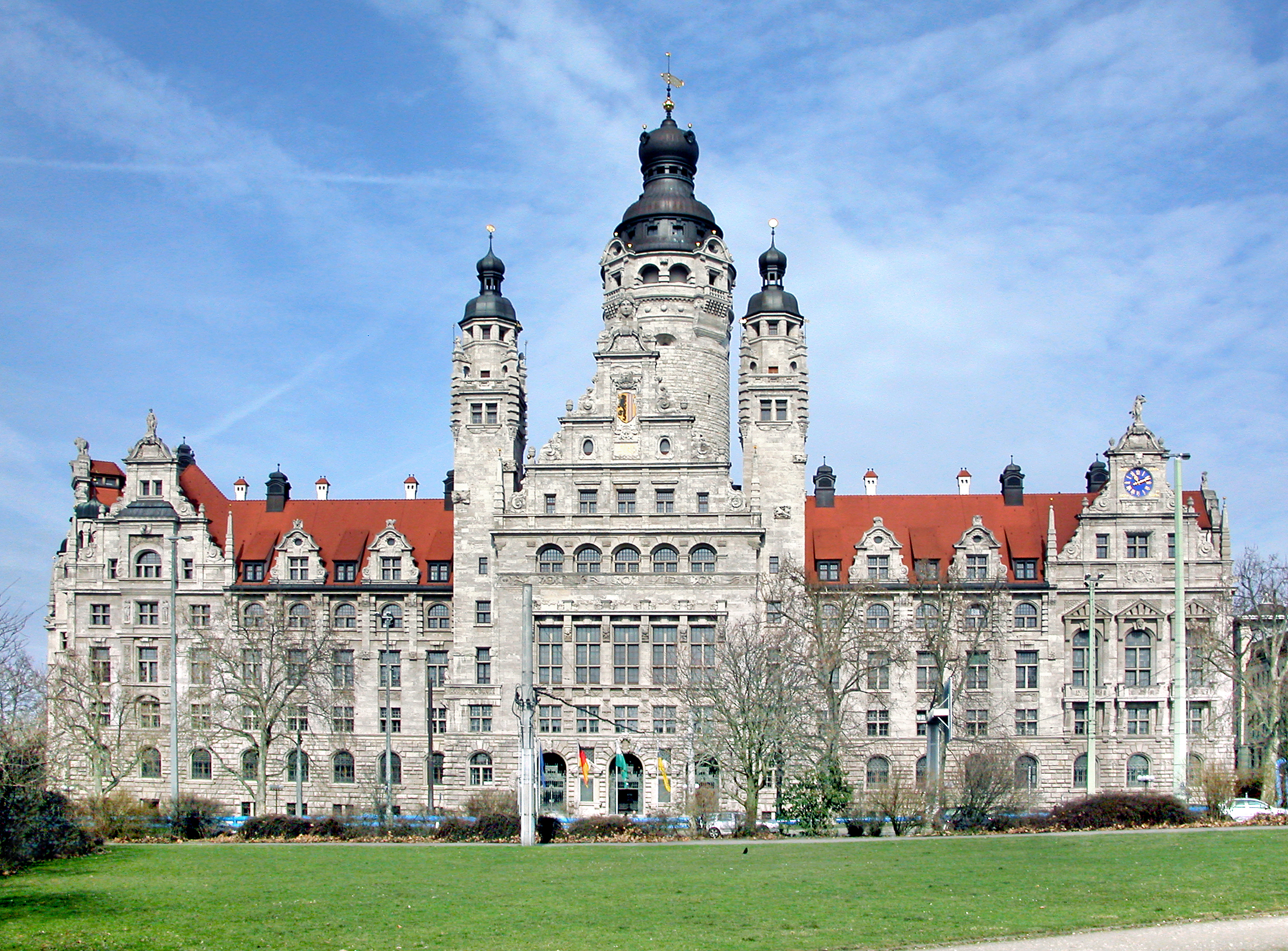
Front view

The New Town Hall (German: Neues Rathaus) is the seat of the Leipzig city administration since 1905. It stands in Leipzig's district Mitte within the Leipzig's "ring road" on the southwest corner opposite the newly built Propsteikirche. The main tower is, at 114.8 meters or 377 feet, the tallest city hall tower in Germany, "trumping Hamburg's previous record by a whole eight feet". The building is the largest city hall in the world, by number of rooms (1,708).

== History ==
At the end of the 19th century, the Old Town Hall located at the Markt square finally proved too small for the booming city. In 1895 the city of Leipzig was granted the site of the Pleissenburg by the Kingdom of Saxony to build a new town hall. A competition was held for architectural designs with the specification that the Rapunzel tower silhouette of the Pleißenburg be retained. In 1897 the architect and city building director of Leipzig Hugo Licht was awarded the job of designing it. The motto of his design was: "Arx nova surgit - a new castle emerges." The sculptor Georg Wrba was commissioned with the sculptural design of the building.

The foundation stone of the New Town Hall was laid on 19 October 1899.

The hall is notable as the location of numerous mass suicides during the final days of the Third Reich.

== Architecture ==
The building complex, designed in the style of historicism and made of light-grey, Main-Franconian shelly limestone, forms an irregular pentagon over an area of more than 10,000 m^{2} (107,600 sq.ft.). The tower stands on the base of the old Pleissenburg tower. From the fourth floor, 250 steps lead to the upper tower passage with the possibility of viewing. On the southwest facade are the five statues "Crafts", "Justice", "Book Art", "Science" and "Music" by the artists Arthur Trebst, Johannes Hartmann, Adolf Lehnert, Josef Mágr and Hans Zeissig. The clock at the town hall, which is illuminated blue at night, contains the Latin inscription MORS CERTA, HORA INCERTA (Death is certain, its hour uncertain), in the vernacular "The clock is sure to be wrong". The female gable figure above the clock symbolizes Truth. The west gable, on the other hand, has as its subject the personification "The official secret" by Johannes Hartmann.

== The Goerdeler Memorial ==
At the southwestern tip of the New Town Hall, in the green belt of the so called Promenadenring, there is a memorial to Carl Friedrich Goerdeler, one of the leading forces in the bourgeois resistance against Nazism and Leipzig's Mayor (Oberbürgermeister) from 1930 until 1937. He was sentenced to death and executed. 55 years later, the memorial, conceptualized by the New York artists Jenny Holzer and Mike Glier, was unveiled on 8 September 1999. It consists of a five meter (16.4 ft.) deep bell shaft with a diameter of 2.75 meters (9 ft.). A bronze bell hangs in it. Quotations from letters, newspapers and writings by Carl Friedrich Goerdeler can be found in chronological order around the shaft.

== Culture ==
The Israeli author Yosef Agnon (Nobel Prize in Literature, 1966) describes in the second chapter of his novel "In Mr. Lublin's Store", how the nameless first-person narrator, a young Jewish man from Galicia, haunted in 1915 the authoritative new town hall for obtaining a residence permit in Leipzig.

The town hall features as a backdrop in the Alfred Hitchcock film Torn Curtain.

== Gallery ==
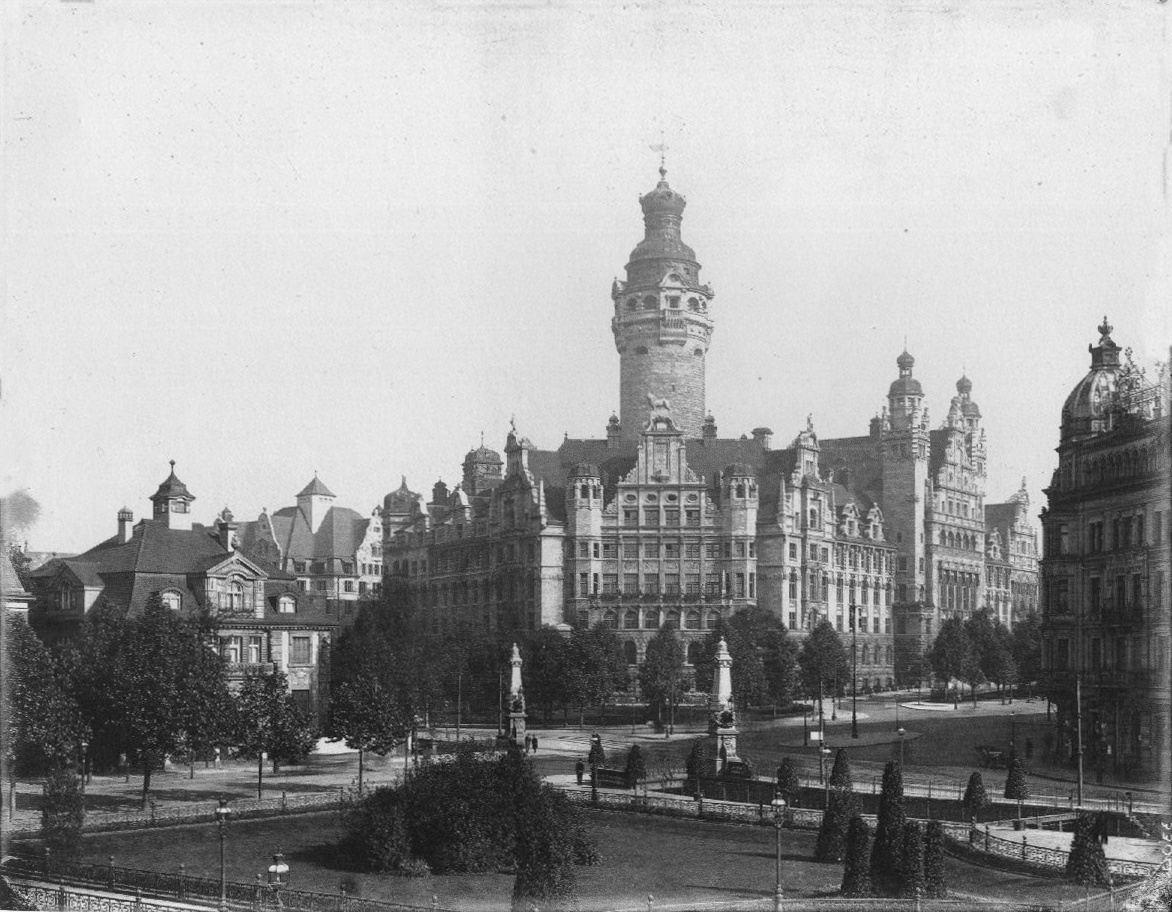
Southwest view, 1905.

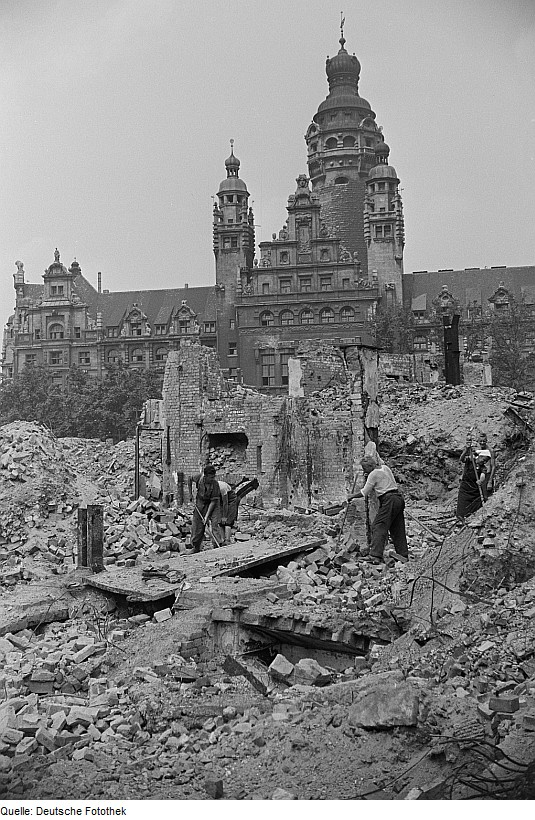
New Town Hall after Bombing of Leipzig in World War II

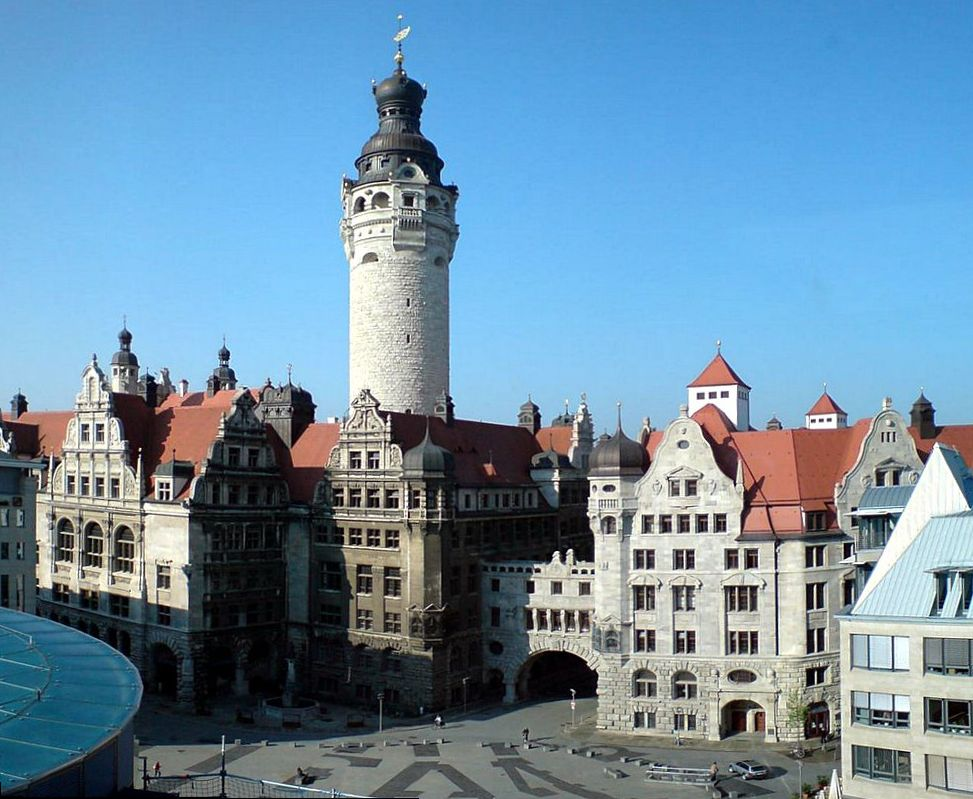
View over New Town Hall and Burgplatz

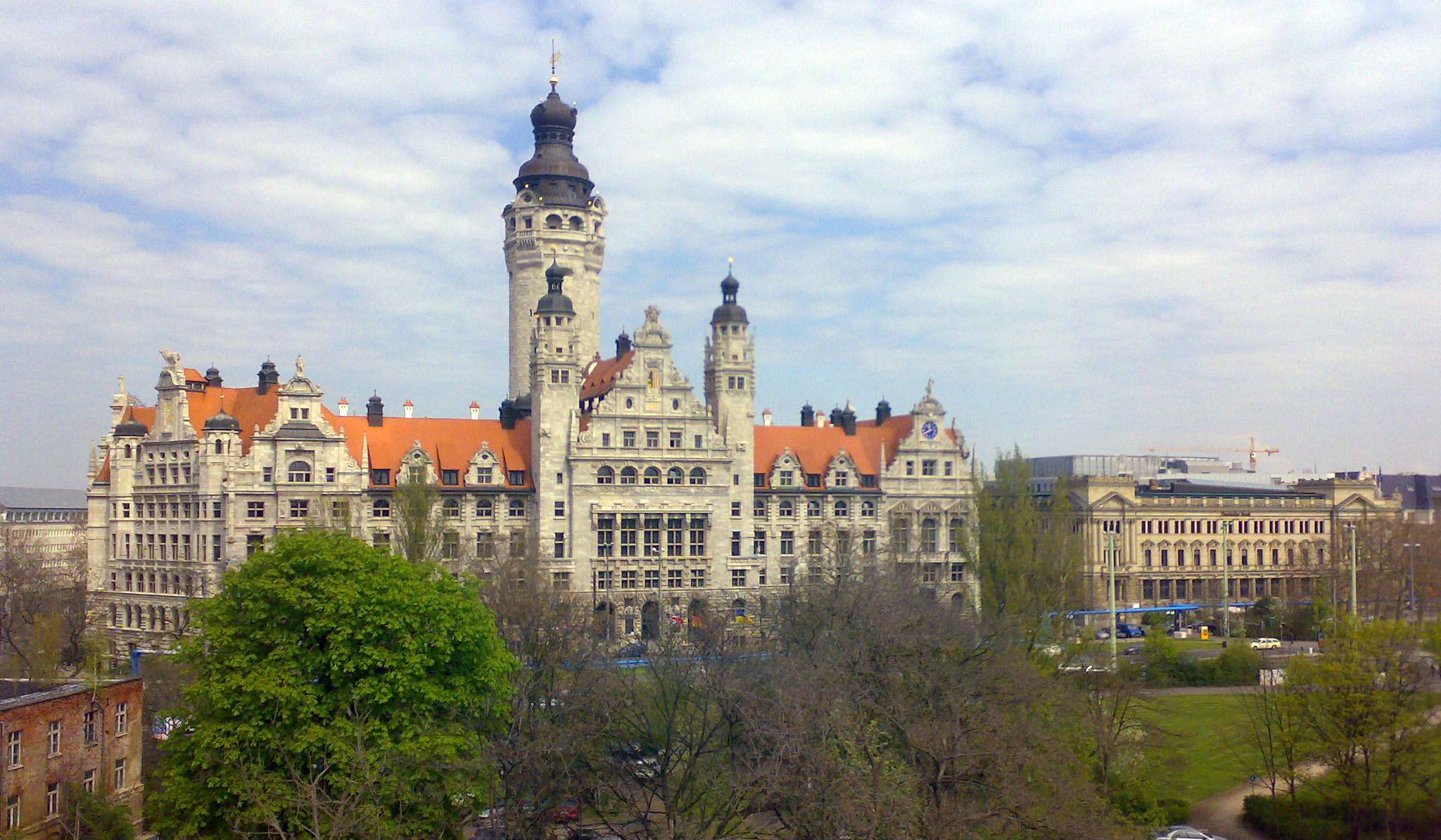
Front view

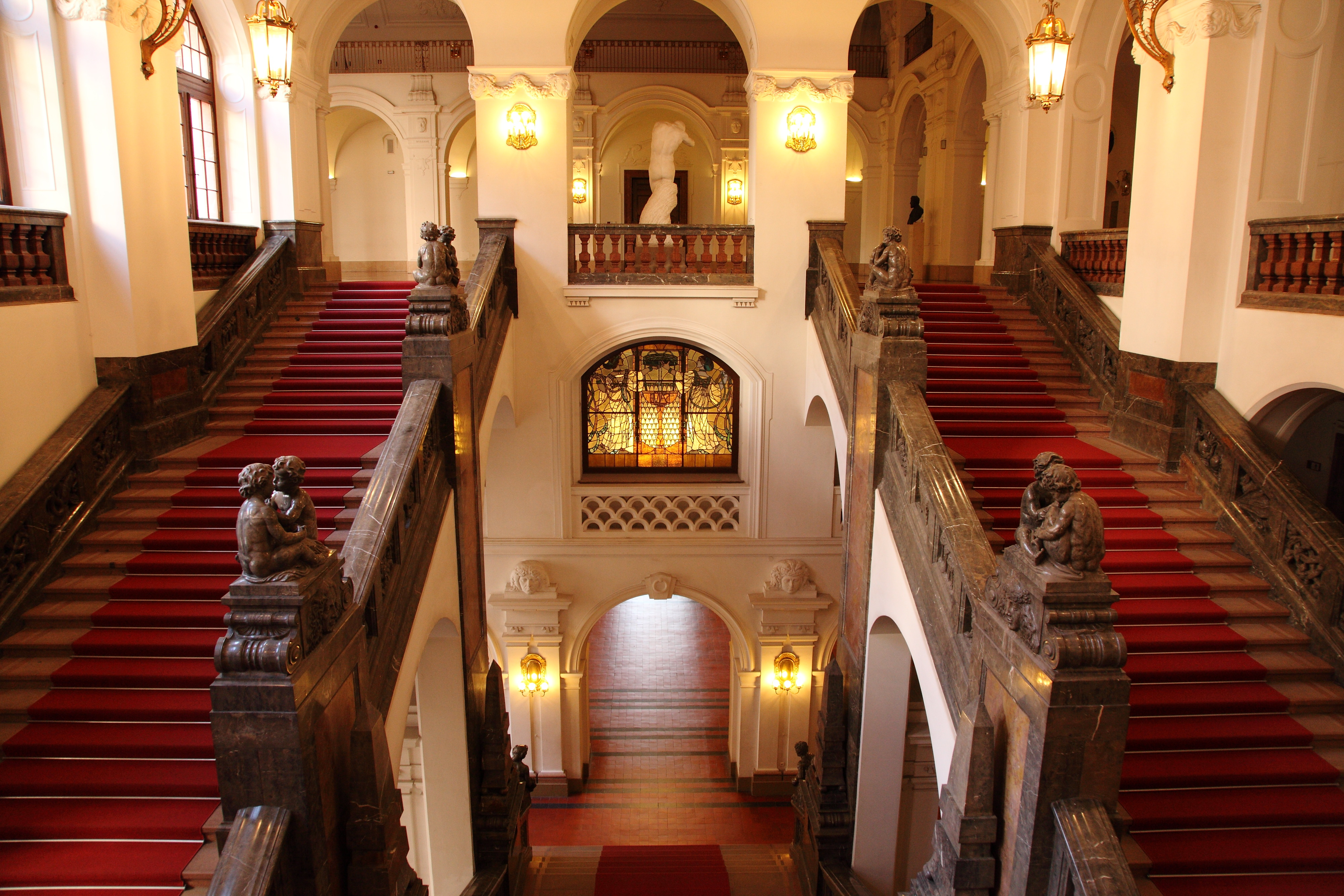
Interior: Staircases of the New City Hall

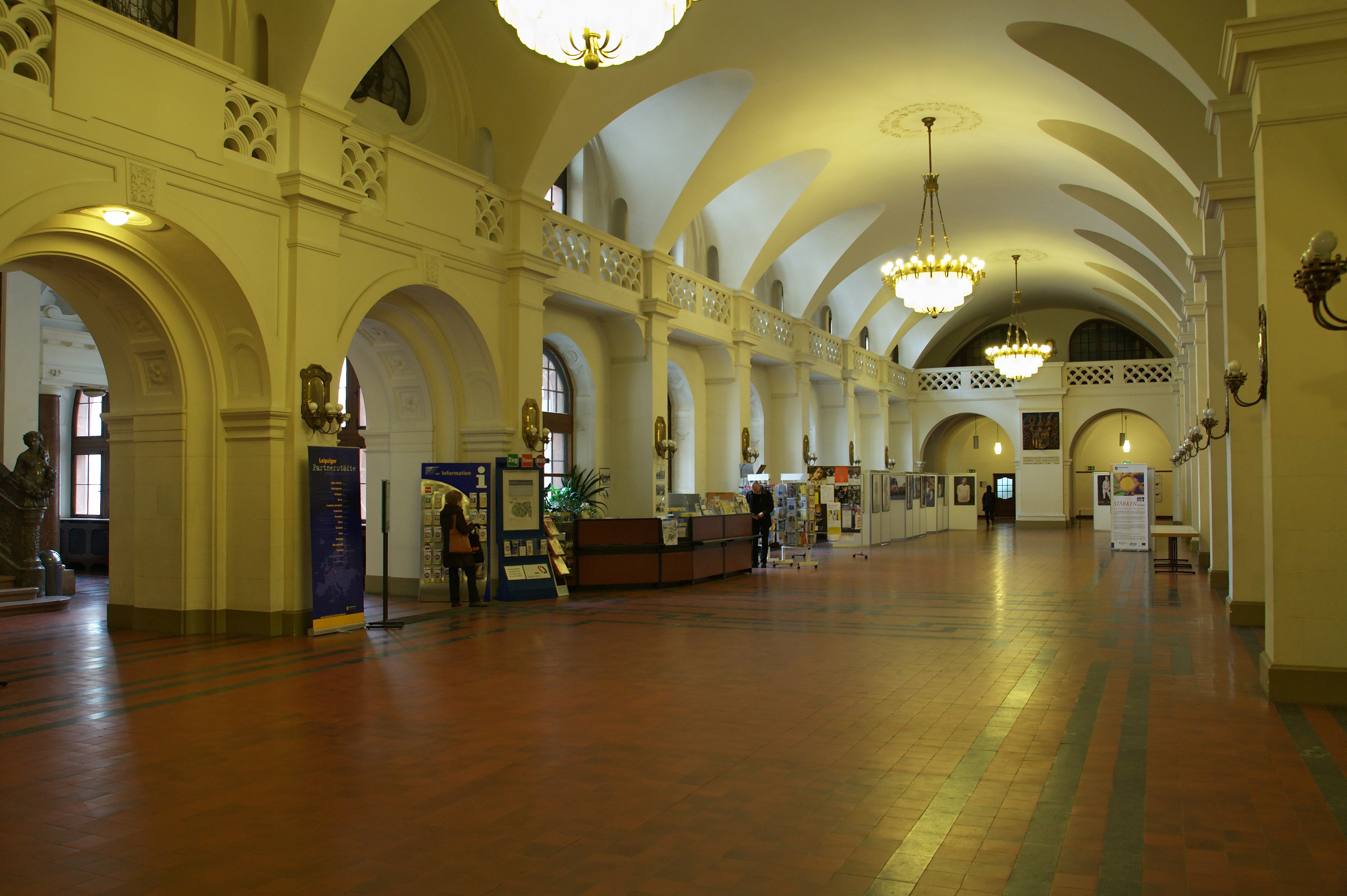
Entrance hall

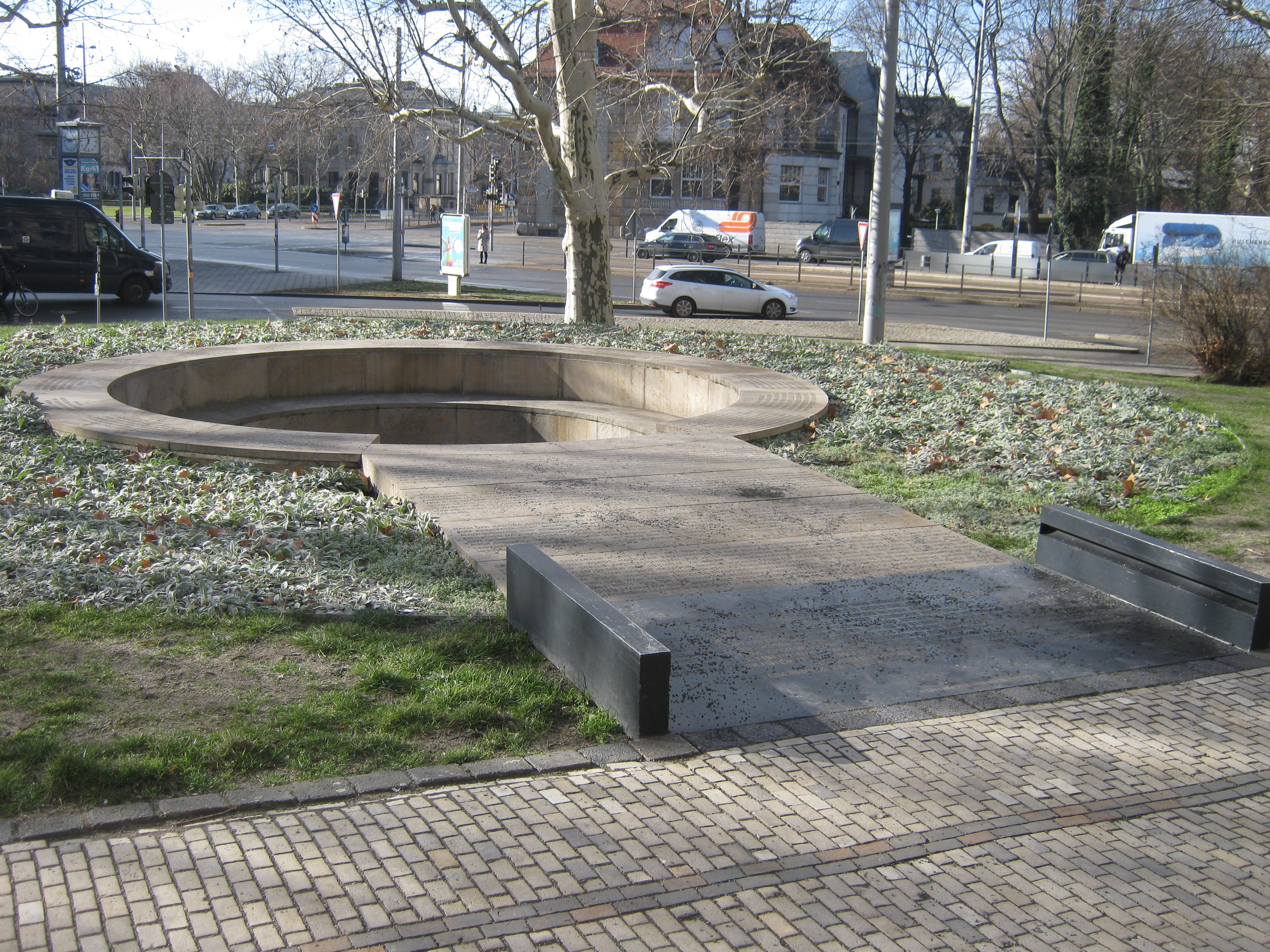
Memorial of Jenny Holzer to Goerdeler at the New Town Hall

== Sources ==
- The Leipzig New Town Hall at the official website of the City of Leipzig (in English)
