= 58th Infantry Division (German Empire) =

58th Infantry Division (58. Infanterie-Division)
- Active: 1915-1919
- Country: Saxony/Germany
- Branch: Army
- Type: Infantry
- Size: Approx. 12,500
- Engagements: World War I: Second Battle of Artois, Gorlice-Tarnów Offensive, Battle of Verdun, Battle of the Somme, Second Battle of the Aisne, Passchendaele

The 58th Infantry Division (58. Infanterie-Division) was a unit of the Imperial German Army in World War I. The division was formed on March 6, 1915, and organized over the next two months. It was part of a wave of new infantry divisions formed in the spring of 1915 and was originally formed from troops from the Kingdom of Saxony and the Kingdom of Württemberg, but became a fully Saxon division by 1916. The division was disbanded in 1919 during the demobilization of the German Army after World War I.

== Combat chronicle ==
The 58th Infantry Division initially fought on the Western Front, seeing action in the Second Battle of Artois. In July 1915, it was transferred to the Eastern Front, and participated in the Gorlice-Tarnów Offensive. In October 1915, it returned to the Western Front and went into the trenchlines in Lorraine. In 1916, it fought in the Battle of Verdun and the Battle of the Somme. In 1917, it fought in the Second Battle of the Aisne, also called the Third Battle of Champagne. In late April 1917, the division went back to the Eastern Front, where it remained until October. After returning to the Western Front, it saw action in the late phases of the Battle of Passchendaele, also called the Third Battle of Ypres. The division remained in the Flanders region until August 1918, when it went to the Somme region, fighting at Monchy-Bapaume and later resisting the Allied offensive between Cambrai and St. Quentin. Allied intelligence rated the division as second class.

== Order of battle on formation ==
The 58th Infantry Division was formed as a triangular division. The order of battle of the division on March 6, 1915, was as follows:

- 116.Infanterie-Brigade
  - Königlich Sächsisches 7. Infanterie-Regiment König Georg Nr. 106
  - Königlich Sächsisches 8. Infanterie-Regiment Prinz Johann Georg Nr. 107
  - Königlich Württembergisches Reserve-Infanterie-Regiment Nr. 120
  - Radfahrer-Kompanie Nr. 58
- 4.Eskadron/Königlich Sächsisches 2. Ulanen-Regiment Nr. 18
- 58. Feldartillerie-Brigade
  - Königlich Sächsisches Feldartillerie-Regiment Nr. 115
  - Königlich Württembergisches Feldartillerie-Regiment Nr. 116
  - Fußartillerie-Bataillon Nr. 58
- Pionier-Kompanie Nr. 115
- Pionier-Kompanie Nr. 116

== Order of battle on January 1, 1918 ==
The Württemberg elements of the division were transferred out and the division became fully Saxon by the end of 1916. Over the course of the war, other changes took place, including the formation of artillery and signals commands and the expansion of combat engineer support to a full pioneer battalion. The order of battle on January 1, 1918, was as follows:

- 116.Infanterie-Brigade
  - Königlich Sächsisches Reserve-Infanterie-Regiment Nr. 103
  - Königlich Sächsisches 7. Infanterie-Regiment König Georg Nr. 106
  - Königlich Sächsisches 8. Infanterie-Regiment Prinz Johann Georg Nr. 107
- 4.Eskadron/Königlich Sächsisches 2. Ulanen-Regiment Nr. 18
- Königlich Sächsischer Artillerie-Kommandeur 57
  - Königlich Sächsisches Feldartillerie-Regiment Nr. 115
  - Fußartillerie-Bataillon Nr. 97 (from June 19, 1918)
- Königlich Sächsisches Pionier-Bataillon Nr. 375
  - Pionier-Kompanie Nr. 115
  - Pionier-Kompanie Nr. 116
  - Minenwerfer-Kompanie Nr. 58
- Königlich Sächsischer Divisions-Nachrichten-Kommandeur 58
