= List of Gauleiters =

List of Nazi Party regional leaders

The List of Gauleiter enumerates 114 men who held the Nazi Party (NSDAP) senior regional leader rank of Gauleiter under Adolf Hitler, from the reestablishment of the party in February 1925 to the fall of the Nazi regime in May 1945. It includes those that served in Germany proper and in those territories that were incorporated into Germany from 1935 to 1944. However, it does not include the Gauleiter of the separate Austrian Nazi Party (DNSAP) in the sovereign state of Austria prior to its annexation by Germany in the Anschluss of March 1938.

Of the 44 incumbent Gauleiter who survived the Second World War, 13 committed suicide around the time that Nazi Germany surrendered, eight were executed by the Allies after the war, one was executed by the SS in the closing days of the war and one died in captivity in the Soviet Union. By 1954, when Karl Wahl became the first former Gauleiter to publish his memoirs, eight were still missing, three were in prison and the remaining ten had been imprisoned and released.

== List ==
This is a list of Gauleiter with their Gaue assignment(s), time in office and comments about their fate:

Killed in action	Committed suicide before capture or in captivity	Executed or assassinated	Died in captivity, except suicide or execution	Died of natural causes or through an accident	Imprisoned, later released and died a free man	Eluded capture or escaped from captivity	Fate unknown or unclear

Gauleiter	Gau(e)	In office	Fate
Herbert Albrecht	Gau Mecklenburg	1930–1931	Died in June 1945
Alois Bachschmid	Gau Elbe-Havel (Note: Gau Elbe-Havel merged with Gau Anhalt and Gau Magdeburg to form Gau Anhalt-North Saxony Province in 1926; renamed Gau Magdeburg-Anhalt in 1928)	1925–1926	Died in 1968 in Italy
Ernst Wilhelm Bohle	NSDAP/AO (Note: Foreign Organization branch of the Nazi Party)	1934–1945	Imprisoned until 1949, died in 1960 in West Germany
Fritz Bracht	Gau Oberschlesien (Note: Created when Gau Schlesien was split into two separate Gaue)	1941–1945	Committed suicide in May 1945
Karl Brück	Gau Saar (Note: Gau Saar merged with Gau Rheinpfalz to form Gau Pfalz-Saar in 1935)	1931–1933	Died in 1964 in West Germany
Josef Bürckel	Gau Rheinpfalz (Note: Gau Rheinpfalz merged with Gau Saar to form Gau Pfalz-Saar in 1935)	1926–1935	Died in September 1944
Josef Bürckel	Gau Saar	1933–1935	Died in September 1944
Josef Bürckel	Gau Pfalz–Saar (Note: Gau Pfalz-Saar was founded in 1935 when Gau Saar & Gau Rheinpfalz merged. It was renamed Gau Saarpfalz in 1936 and finally Gau Westmark in 1940 when it absorbed part of French Lorraine)	1935–1944	Died in September 1944
Josef Bürckel	Reichsgau Wien	1939–1940	Died in September 1944
Helmuth Brückner	Gau Schlesien (Note: Gau Schlesien was divided into Gau Niederschlesien & Gau Oberschlesien in 1941)	1925–1934	Died in Soviet captivity in 1951 or 1954
Walther von Corswant	Gau Pommern	1927–1931	Died in 1942
Léon Degrelle	Reichsgau Wallonien	1944–1945 (Note: In exile in Germany)	Escaped to Spain in 1945 where he died in 1994
Artur Dinter	Gau Thüringen	1925–1927	Died in 1948 in the French occupation zone in Germany
August Eigruber	Reichsgau Oberdonau	1938–1945	Found guilty in the Dachau trials and executed at Landsberg Prison in May 1947
Joachim Albrecht Eggeling	Gau Magdeburg-Anhalt	1935–1937	Committed suicide in April 1945
Joachim Albrecht Eggeling	Gau Halle-Merseburg	1937–1945	Committed suicide in April 1945
Adolf Ehrecke	Gau Saar	1929–1931	Died in 1980 in West Germany
Otto Erbersdobler	Gau Niederbayern (Note: Gau Niederbayern became a part of Bayerische Ostmark 1933)	1929–1932	Died in 1981 in West Germany
Walter Ernst	Gau Halle-Merseburg	1925–1926	Killed in action in March 1945 near Danzig
Friedrich Karl Florian	Gau Düsseldorf (Note: Gau Düsseldorf was founded in 1930 from the Bezirk Bergisches-Land)	1930–1945	Imprisoned until 1951, died in 1975 in West Germany
Albert Forster	Gau Danzig	1930–1939	Executed in Poland in 1952
Albert Forster	Reichsgau Danzig-Westpreußen (Note: Gau Danzig-Westpreußen was known as Gau Danzig before 1939)	1939–1945	Executed in Poland in 1952
Peter Gemeinder	Gau Hessen-Darmstadt (Note: Gau Hessen-Darmstadt was formed in 1927; it merged with Gau Hessen-Nassau-Süd to form Gau Hessen-Nassau in 1933)	1931	Died in 1931
Karl Gerland	Gau Kurhessen (Note: Kurhessen was known as Gau Hessen-Nassau-Nord before 1934)	1943–1945 (acting to 1944)	Killed in action in April 1945 in Frankfurt on the Oder
Paul Giesler	Gau Westfalen-Süd	1941–1943	Committed suicide in May 1945
Paul Giesler	Gau München-Oberbayern (Note: Gau München-Oberbayern was founded in 1930 when the Bezirk Oberbayern & Gross-München merged)	1944–1945	Committed suicide in May 1945
Odilo Globocnik	Reichsgau Wien	1938–1939	Committed suicide in British captivity in May 1945
Joseph Goebbels	Gau Berlin-Brandenburg (Note: Gau Berlin-Brandenburg was formed in 1926 by the merger of Gau Groß-Berlin and Gau Potsdam; it was divided into Gau Berlin and Gau Brandenburg in 1928)	1926–1928	Committed suicide in Berlin in May 1945
Joseph Goebbels	Gau Berlin	1928–1945	Committed suicide in Berlin in May 1945
Arthur Greiser	Reichsgau Wartheland (Note: Wartheland was also known as Warthegau)	1939–1945	Executed in Poland in 1946
Wilhelm Grimm	Gau Mittelfranken (Note: Gau Mittelfranken became a part of Franken 1929)	1928–1929	Executed in 1944 for connection with the 20 July plot
Josef Grohé	Gau Köln-Aachen	1931–1945	Imprisoned until 1950, died in 1987 in West Germany
Heinrich Haake	Gau Rheinland–Süd (Note: Gau Rheinland-Süd was divided into Köln-Aachen & Koblenz-Trier in 1931)	1925	Died in British captivity in 1945
Ludolf Haase	Gau Hannover-Süd (Note: Founded as Gau Göttingen in 1925, the renamed Gau Hannover-Süd became a part of Südhannover-Braunschweig in 1928)	1925–1928	Died in 1972 in West Germany
Karl Hanke	Gau Niederschlesien (Note: Created when Gau Schlesien was split into two separate Gaue)	1941–1945	Captured and killed by Czech partisans
Anton Haselmayer	Gau Hessen-Nassau-Süd (Note: Gau Hessen-Nassau-Süd merged with Gau Hessen-Darmstadt to form Gau Hessen-Nassau in 1933)	1925–1926	Died in 1962
Edmund Heines	Gau Oberpfalz (Note: Gau Oberpfalz became a part of Bayerische Ostmark in 1933)	1930 (acting)	Executed during the Night of the Long Knives in 1934
Otto Hellmuth	Gau Unterfranken (Note: Unterfranken was known as Gau Mainfranken after 1935)	1928–1945	Imprisoned until 1955, committed suicide in 1968 in West Germany
Konrad Henlein	Reichsgau Sudetenland	1938–1945	Committed suicide in U.S. captivity in May 1945
Friedrich Hildebrandt	Gau Mecklenburg	1925–1930 1931–1945	Found guilty in the Dachau trials and executed at Landsberg Prison in November 1948
Paul Hinkler	Gau Halle-Merseburg	1926–1931	Committed suicide in April 1945
Franz Hofer	Reichsgau Tirol-Vorarlberg	1938–1945	Escaped captivity in 1948, re-arrested 1949, and imprisoned until 1952. Died in 1975 in West Germany.
Albert Hoffmann	Gau Westfalen-Süd	1943–1945	Imprisoned until 1950. Died in West Germany in 1972
Paul Hofmann	Gau Magdeburg-Anhalt	1932	Died in 1980 in West Berlin
Hans Albert Hohnfeldt	Gau Danzig	1926–1928	Died in 1948
Emil Holtz	Gau Brandenburg (Note: Gau Brandenburg was separated from Gau Berlin-Brandenburg in 1928 and merged with Gau Ostmark to form Gau Kurmark in 1933)	1928–1930	Fate unknown
Karl Holz	Gau Franken (Note: Gau Franken was founded in 1929 when Mittelfranken merged with the Bezirk Nürnberg-Fürth)	1942–1945 (acting to 1944)	Died 20 April 1945 under unclear circumstances in the defense of Nuremberg, either committed suicide or killed in action
Rudolf Jordan	Gau Halle-Merseburg	1931–1937	Imprisoned in the Soviet Union until 1955, died in West Germany in 1988
Rudolf Jordan	Gau Magdeburg-Anhalt	1937–1945	Imprisoned in the Soviet Union until 1955, died in West Germany in 1988
Jakob Jung	Gau Saar	1926–1929	Death date unknown
Rudolf Jung	N/A (Note: Honorary Gauleiter, no Gau assignment)	1938–1945	Committed suicide in Czech captivity in December 1945
Walter Jung	Gau Saar	1926	Death date unknown
Hugo Jury	Reichsgau Niederdonau	1938–1945	Committed suicide 8 May 1945
Wilhelm Karpenstein	Gau Pommern	1931–1934	Died 2 May 1968 in West Germany
Karl Kaufmann	Gau Rheinland–Nord (Note: Gau Rheinland-Nord merged with Gau Westfalen to become Großgau Ruhr in 1926)	1925	Imprisoned intermittently until 1953, died in 1969 in West Germany
Karl Kaufmann	Großgau Ruhr (Note: Großgau Ruhr was divided into Gau Essen, Gau Westfalen and Bezirk Bergisches-Land in 1928)	1926–1928	Imprisoned intermittently until 1953, died in 1969 in West Germany
Karl Kaufmann	Gau Hamburg	1929–1945	Imprisoned intermittently until 1953, died in 1969 in West Germany
Josef Klant	Gau Hamburg	1925–1926	Died 4 November 1926
Walter Klaunig	Gau Brandenburg/Potsdam (Note: Gau Brandenburg, founded in 1925 and renamed Gau Potsdam in 1926, merged with Groß-Berlin later in 1926 to form Gau Berlin-Brandenburg)	1925–1926	Fate unknown
Hubert Klausner	Reichsgau Kärnten	1938–1939	Died in 1939
Erich Koch	Gau Ostpreußen	1928–1945	Died in prison in Poland in 1986
Albert Krebs	Gau Hamburg	1926–1928	Died in 1974 in West Germany
Hans Krebs	N/A (Note: Honorary Gauleiter, no Gau assignment)	1938–1945	Executed for treason in Czechoslovakia in February 1947
Wilhelm Kube	Gau Ostmark (Note: Gau Ostmark separated from Gau Berlin-Brandenburg in 1928 and became part of Gau Kurmark in 1933)	1928–1933	Assassinated by Soviet partisans in September 1943
Wilhelm Kube	Gau Kurmark (Note: Kurmark was founded in 1933 when Gau Ostmark merged with Gau Brandenburg; it was renamed Gau Mark Brandenburg in 1939)	1933–1936	Assassinated by Soviet partisans in September 1943
Franz Kutschera	Reichsgau Kärnten	1939–1941	Executed by Polish resistance fighters in February 1944
Hartmann Lauterbacher	Gau Südhannover-Braunschweig (Note: Gau Südhannover-Braunschweig was founded in 1928 when Hannover-Nord & Hannover-Süd merged)	1940–1945	Escaped from captivity in 1948 to Rome, worked for western intelligence agencies and died in 1988 in West Germany
Karl Lenz	Gau Hessen-Darmstadt	1931–1932	Died in 1944
Josef Leopold	N/A (Note: Honorary Gauleiter, no Gau assignment)	1938–1941	Killed in action in July 1941 in Malyn, Ukrainian SSR
Robert Ley	Gau Rheinland–Süd	1925–1931	Indicted at the Nuremberg trials, but committed suicide in his cell in October 1945 before the trials began
Karl Linder	Gau Hessen-Nassau-Süd	1926–1927	Died in 1979 in West Germany
Karl Linder	Gau Hessen-Nassau	1932	Died in 1979 in West Germany
Wilhelm Friedrich Loeper	Gau Magdeburg-Anhalt	1927–1935	Died in 1935
Hinrich Lohse	Gau Hamburg	1928–1929	Imprisoned until 1951, died in 1964 in West Germany
Hinrich Lohse	Gau Schleswig-Holstein	1925–1945	Imprisoned until 1951, died in 1964 in West Germany
Walter Maass	Gau Danzig	1928–1929 (acting)	Fate unknown
Franz Maierhofer	Gau Oberpfalz	1929–1932 (acting to 1930)	Killed in action in August 1943 near Kharkov
Alfred Meyer	Gau Westfalen-Nord	1931–1945	Committed suicide in April 1945
Joachim Meyer-Quade	Gau Schleswig-Holstein	1932	Killed in action in September 1939 near Piątek in Poland
Hermann Muhs	Gau Südhannover-Braunschweig	1932	Died in 1962 in West Germany
Eugen Munder	Gau Württemberg-Hohenzollern	1925–1928	Imprisoned until 1948, died in 1952 in West Germany
Wilhelm Murr	Gau Württemberg-Hohenzollern	1928–1945	Committed suicide in French captivity in May 1945
Martin Mutschmann	Gau Sachsen	1925–1945	Executed in the Soviet Union in February 1947
Hans Nieland	NSDAP/AO	1932–1933	Imprisoned until 1948, died in 1976 in West Germany
Franz Pfeffer von Salomon	Gau Westfalen (Note: Gau Westfalen became a part of Großgau Ruhr in 1926)	1925–1926	Died in 1968 in West Germany
Alfred Proksch	N/A (Note: Honorary Gauleiter, no Gau assignment)	1934–1945	Died in 1981 in Vienna, Austria
Friedrich Rainer	Reichsgau Salzburg	1938–1941	Executed in Yugoslavia in November 1950
Friedrich Rainer	Reichsgau Kärnten	1941–1945	Executed in Yugoslavia in November 1950
Fritz Reinhardt	Gau Niederbayern	1928–1930	Imprisoned until 1950, died in 1969 in West Germany
Friedrich Ringshausen	Gau Hessen-Darmstadt	1927–1931	Died in 1941
Axel Ripke	Gau Rheinland-Nord	1925	Died in 1937
Carl Röver	Gau Weser-Ems	1928–1942	Died in 1942
Ludwig Ruckdeschel	Gau Bayreuth	1945	Imprisoned until 1952, died in 1986 in West Germany
Bernhard Rust	Gau Hannover-Nord (Note: Gau Hannover-Nord became a part of Südhannover-Braunschweig 1928)	1925–1928	Committed suicide in May 1945
Bernhard Rust	Gau Südhannover-Braunschweig	1928–1940	Committed suicide in May 1945
Fritz Sauckel	Gau Thüringen	1927–1945	Found guilty in the Nuremberg trials, executed in October 1946
Gustav Adolf Scheel	Reichsgau Salzburg	1941–1945	Imprisoned intermittently until 1953, died in 1979 in West Germany
Hans Schemm	Gau Oberfranken (Note: Gau Oberfranken became a part of Bayerische Ostmark in 1933)	1928–1933	Died of injuries sustained in an aircraft crash in March 1935
Hans Schemm	Gau Bayerische Ostmark (Note: Gau Bayerische Ostmark was founded in 1933 when Gau Oberfranken, Niederbayern and Oberpfalz merged. It was renamed Gau Bayreuth after its capital in 1942)	1933–1935	Died of injuries sustained in an aircraft crash in March 1935
Bruno Gustav Scherwitz	Gau Ostpreußen	1926–1927	Died in 1985 in West Germany
Baldur von Schirach	Reichsgau Wien	1940–1945	Found guilty in the Nuremberg trials, imprisoned until 1966, died 1974 in West Germany
Ernst Schlange	Gau Gross-Berlin (Note: Gau Groß-Berlin merged with Gau Potsdam to form Gau Berlin-Brandenburg in 1926)	1925–1926	Died in Soviet captivity in 1947
Ernst Schlange	Gau Brandenburg	1930–1933	Died in Soviet captivity in 1947
Fritz Schlessmann	Gau Essen	1940–1945 (acting)	Imprisoned until 1950, died in 1964 in West Germany
Erich Schmiedicke	Gau Groß-Berlin	1926 (acting)	Fate unknown
Erich Schmiedicke	Gau Brandenburg	1933 (acting)	Fate unknown
Gustav Hermann Schmischke	Gau Anhalt (Note: Gau Anhalt merged with Gau Elbe-Havel and Gau Magdeburg to form Gau Anhalt-North Saxony Province in 1926; renamed Gau Magdeburg-Anhalt in 1928)	1925–1927	Fate unknown
Walter Schultz	Gau Hessen-Nassau-Nord (Note: Gau Hessen-Nassau-Nord renamed Gau Kurhessen 1934)	1925–1928	Died in 1953 in West Germany
Walter Schultz	Gau Hessen-Nassau-Süd	1926 (acting)	Died in 1953 in West Germany
Franz Schwede	Gau Pommern	1934–1945	Imprisoned until 1956, died in 1960 in West Germany
Gustav Simon	Gau Moselland (Note: Moselland was named Gau Koblenz-Trier until 1942)	1931–1945	Captured by the British Army, found hanged in his cell in December 1945
Jakob Sprenger	Gau Hessen-Nassau-Süd	1927–1933	Committed suicide in May 1945
Jakob Sprenger	Gau Hessen-Nassau (Note: Gau Hessen-Nassau was founded 1933 when Hessen-Darmstadt merged with Hessen-Nassau-Süd)	1933–1945	Committed suicide in May 1945
Gustav Staebe	Gau Saar	1929 (acting)	Died in 1983 in West Germany
Wilhelm Stich	Gau Ostpreußen	1925–1926	Fate unknown
Willi Stöhr	Gau Westmark	1944–1945	Escaped to Canada, date of death unknown
Gregor Strasser	Gau Niederbayern–Oberpfalz (Note: Gau Niederbayern-Oberpfalz was divided into Niederbayern & Oberpfalz in 1929)	1925–1929	Executed during the Night of the Long Knives in 1934
Julius Streicher	Gau Franken	1929–1940	Found guilty in the Nuremberg trials and executed in October 1946
Emil Stürtz	Gau March of Brandenburg	1936–1945	Missing since April 1945, presumed captured by Soviets, declared dead by German court in 1957
Otto Telschow	Gau Lüneburg-Stade (Note: Gau Lüneburg-Stade renamed Gau Osthannover in 1928)	1925–1928	Captured by the British Army, committed suicide in May 1945
Otto Telschow	Gau Osthannover	1928–1945	Captured by the British Army, committed suicide in May 1945
Josef Terboven	Gau Essen	1928–1945	Committed suicide in Norway in May 1945
Siegfried Uiberreither	Reichsgau Steiermark	1938–1945	Escaped from captivity in 1948 to Argentina, possibly died in 1984 in West Germany
Theodor Vahlen	Gau Pommern	1925–1927	Died in 1945 in captivity in Czechoslovakia
Ludwig Viereck	Harzgau (Note: Renamed Gau Magdeburg in early 1926 and merged with Gau Anhalt and Gau Elbe-Havel to form Gau Anhalt-North Saxony Province later that year; renamed Gau Magdeburg-Anhalt in 1928)	1925–1926	Fate unknown
Fritz Wächtler	Gau Bayerische Ostmark	1935–1945	Executed by the SS in April 1945
Adolf Wagner	Gau München-Oberbayern	1929–1944	Died in April 1944
Josef Wagner	Gau Westfalen (Note: Gau Westfalen was formed from Großgau Ruhr in 1928 and was divided into Gau Westfalen-Nord and Gau Westfalen-Süd in 1931)	1928–1931	Killed in May 1945 either by the SS or Soviet troops
Josef Wagner	Gau Schlesien (Note: Gau Schlesien was divided into Niederschlesien & Oberschlesien in 1941)	1934–1941	Killed in May 1945 either by the SS or Soviet troops
Josef Wagner	Gau Westfalen-Süd	1931–1941	Killed in May 1945 either by the SS or Soviet troops
Robert Heinrich Wagner	Gau Baden-Elsaß (Note: Included the French Alsace region from 1940 onwards and was renamed Gau Baden-Alsace)	1925–1945	Executed in October 1946 in France
Karl Wahl	Gau Schwaben	1928–1945	Imprisoned until 1948, died in 1981 in West Germany
Friedrich Wambsganss	Gau Rheinpfalz	1925–1926	Imprisoned until 1948, died in 1979 in West Germany
Paul Wegener	Gau Weser-Ems	1942–1945	Imprisoned until 1951, died in 1993 in Germany
Karl Weinrich	Gau Kurhessen	1928–1943	Imprisoned until 1950, died in 1973 in West Germany
Jef van de Wiele	Reichsgau Flandern	1944–1945 (Note: In exile in Germany)	Imprisoned until 1963, died in 1979 in Belgium
Hans Zimmermann	Gau Franken	1940–1942 (acting)	Died in 1984 in West Germany
