= List of Nazi suicides =

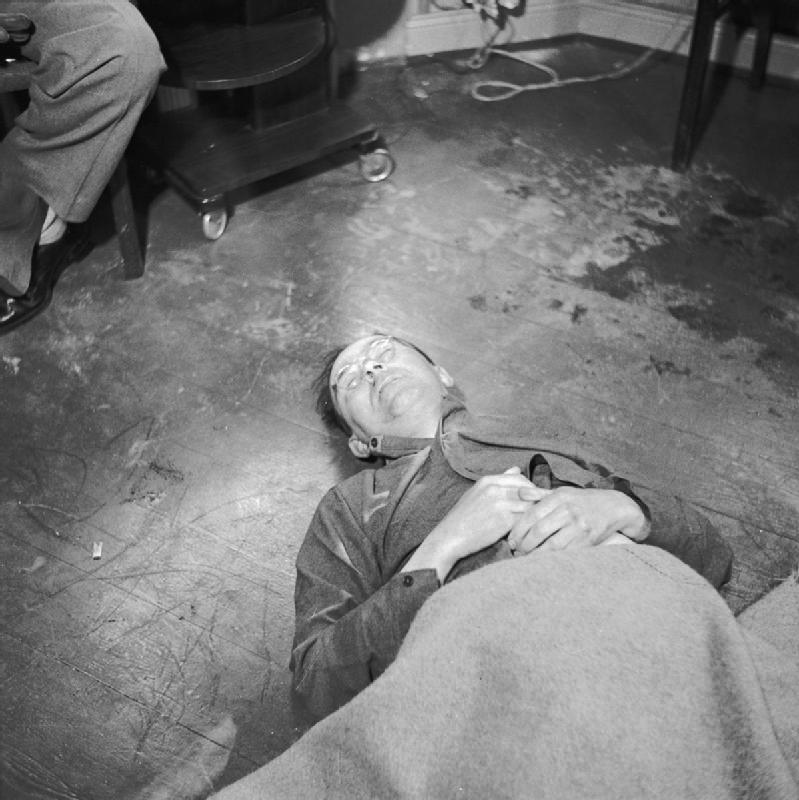
Heinrich Himmler's corpse after his suicide by cyanide poisoning in Allied custody, May 1945

This is a list of Nazi suicides. Many prominent Nazis, Nazi followers, and members of the armed forces died by suicide during the last days of World War II. Others killed themselves after being captured. Those who committed suicide includes 8 out of 41 Nazi Party regional leaders (Gauleiter) who held office between 1926 and 1945, 7 out of 47 Higher SS and Police Leaders, 53 out of 554 army generals, 14 out of 98 Luftwaffe generals, 11 out of 53 admirals in the Kriegsmarine, and an unknown number of junior officials.

In many cases, Nazis died by joint suicide with their wife and children. There were also notable cases of suicide attempts, such as that of Ludwig Beck and Carl-Heinrich von Stülpnagel.

Suicides occurred in Germany, except where noted otherwise.

	Person was a Nazi Party member
†	Died by suicide in prison custody
*	Died by suicide together with spouse (joint suicide)
	Member of the 20 July plot

Person	Method	Location	Date	Age
Alwin-Broder Albrecht		Berlin	May 1, 1945	41 years, 225 days
Friedrich Alpers†		Mons, Belgium	September 3, 1944	43 years, 162 days
Georg Altner	Firearm	Dortmund	April 12, 1945	43 years, 129 days
Günther Angern		Stalingrad, Soviet Union	February 2, 1943	49 years, 334 days
Karl Astel	Firearm	Jena	April 3, 1945	47 years, 36 days
Georg Bachmayer*	Firearm	Münzbach, Austria	May 8, 1945	31 years, 269 days
Herbert Backe†	Hanging	Nuremberg	April 6, 1947	50 years, 340 days
Konrad Barde		Traunstein	May 4, 1945	47 years, 172 days
Erich Bärenfänger*		Berlin	May 2, 1945	30 years, 110 days
Rudolf Batz†	Hanging	Wuppertal	February 8, 1961	57 years, 90 days
Karl Heinrich Emil Becker		Berlin	April 8, 1940	60 years, 207 days
Kurt von Behr*	Poison	Kloster Banz	April 15, 1945	55 years, 45 days
Walther Bierkamp		Scharbeutz	May 15, 1945	43 years, 149 days
Albrecht von Blumenthal*	Firearm	Marburg	March 28, 1945	55 years, 230 days
Erpo Freiherr von Bodenhausen		Grobin, Soviet Union	May 9, 1945	48 years, 27 days
Franz von Bodmann†		Altenmarkt im Pongau, Austria	May 25, 1945	37 years, 63 days
Franz Böhme†	Jumping from a height	Nuremberg	May 29, 1947	62 years, 44 days
Andreas Bolek	Firearm	Magdeburg	May 5, 1945	51 years, 2 days
Martin Bormann	Cyanide poisoning	Berlin	May 2, 1945	44 years, 319 days
Willibald Borowietz†	Electrocution	Clinton, Mississippi, USA	July 1, 1945	51 years, 287 days
Hans Bothmann†	Hanging	Heide	April 4, 1946	34 years, 144 days
Philipp Bouhler†	Cyanide poisoning	Altaussee, Austria	May 19, 1945	45 years, 250 days
Fritz Bracht*	Cyanide poisoning	Bad Kudowa, Poland	May 9, 1945	46 years, 111 days
Eva Braun*	Cyanide poisoning	Berlin	April 30, 1945	33 years, 83 days
Walter Buch	Wrist slitting	Schondorf am Ammersee	September 12, 1949	65 years, 323 days
Franz Budka	Firearm	Breslau, Poland	May 6, 1945	24 years, 261 days
Erwin Bumke		Leipzig	April 20, 1945	70 years, 287 days
Heinrich Burchard		Lübtheen	April 11, 1945	50 years, 188 days
Wilhelm Burgdorf	Firearm	Berlin	May 2, 1945	50 years, 76 days
Friedrich-Wilhelm von Chappuis	Firearm	Magdeburg	August 27, 1942	55 years, 348 days
Hans Collani		Sinimäed Hills, Estonia	July 29, 1944	36 years, 167 days
Leonardo Conti†	Hanging	Nuremberg	October 6, 1945	45 years, 43 days
Max de Crinis*	Cyanide poisoning	Stahnsdorf	May 2, 1945	55 years, 338 days
Theodor Dannecker†		Bad Tölz	December 10, 1945	32 years, 258 days
Karl Decker		Braunschweig	April 21, 1945	47 years, 142 days
Julius Dettmann†	Hanging	Amsterdam, Netherlands	July 31, 1945	51 years, 189 days
Erwin Ding-Schuler†		Freising	August 11, 1945	32 years, 326 days
Walter Dönicke	Firearm	Leipzig	April 19, 1945	45 years, 266 days
Friedrich Dollmann	Poison	Le Mans, France	June 28, 1944	62 years, 147 days
Otto-Heinrich Drechsler†		Lübeck	May 5, 1945	50 years, 34 days
Kurt Eberhard†		Stuttgart	September 8, 1947	72 years, 361 days
Irmfried Eberl†	Hanging	Ulm	February 16, 1948	37 years, 161 days
Joachim Albrecht Eggeling	Firearm	Halle	April 15, 1945	60 years, 136 days
Hans Eppinger	Poison	Vienna, Austria	September 25, 1946	67 years, 264 days
Heinrich Fehlis	Firearm	Porsgrunn, Norway	May 11, 1945	38 years, 191 days
Walter Frank		Braunschweig	May 9, 1945	40 years, 86 days
Oswald Freisler		Berlin	March 4, 1939	43 years, 65 days
Fritz Freitag†	Firearm	Graz, Austria	May 10, 1945	51 years, 12 days
Alfred Freyberg*	Cyanide poisoning	Leipzig	April 18, 1945	52 years, 280 days
Wessel Freytag von Loringhoven		Mauerwald	July 26, 1944	44 years, 259 days
Hans-Georg von Friedeburg†	Cyanide poisoning	Flensburg	May 23, 1945	49 years, 312 days
Wolfgang Fürstner	Firearm	Berlin	August 19, 1936	40 years, 137 days
Paul Otto Geibel†		Warsaw, Poland	November 12, 1966	68 years, 155 days
Robert van Genechten	Hanging	Scheveningen, Netherlands	December 13, 1945	50 years, 49 days
Kurt Gerstein†		Paris, France	July 25, 1945	39 years, 348 days
Hermann Geyer		near Wildsee	April 10, 1946	63 years, 277 days
Paul Giesler*	Firearm	Berchtesgaden	May 8, 1945	49 years, 327 days
Werner von Gilsa		Leitmeritz, Czechoslovakia	May 8, 1945	56 years, 65 days
Edmund Glaise-Horstenau†		Nuremberg	July 20, 1946	64 years, 143 days
Odilo Globocnik†	Cyanide poisoning	Paternion, Austria	May 31, 1945	41 years, 40 days
Richard Glücks	Cyanide poisoning	Flensburg	May 10, 1945	56 years, 18 days
Joseph Goebbels*	Firearm	Berlin	May 1, 1945	47 years, 184 days
Magda Goebbels*	Firearm	Berlin	May 1, 1945	43 years, 181 days
Hermann Göring†	Cyanide poisoning	Nuremberg	October 15, 1946	53 years, 276 days
Artur Görlitzer*		Berlin	April 25, 1945	51 years, 307 days
Hermann Görtz†	Cyanide poisoning	Dublin, Ireland	May 23, 1947	56 years, 189 days
Curt von Gottberg†		Flensburg	May 31, 1945	49 years, 109 days
Ernst-Robert Grawitz*	Hand grenade	Potsdam	April 24, 1945	45 years, 320 days
Robert Ritter von Greim†	Cyanide poisoning	Salzburg, Austria	May 24, 1945	52 years, 336 days
Walter Gross		Berlin	April 25, 1945	40 years, 186 days
Rolf Günther†	Cyanide poisoning	Ebensee, Austria	August 1945	32 years
Joachim Hamann		Heikendorf	July 13, 1945	32 years, 56 days
Emil Haussmann†	Hanging	Nuremberg	July 31, 1947	36 years, 293 days
Otto Hellmuth		Reutlingen	April 20, 1968	71 years, 273 days
Konrad Henlein†	Wrist slitting	Plzeň, Czechoslovakia	May 10, 1945	47 years, 4 days
Rudolf Hess†	Hanging	Berlin	August 17, 1987	93 years, 113 days
Walther Hewel	Firearm	Berlin	May 2, 1945	41 years, 120 days
Werner Heyde†	Hanging	Butzbach	February 13, 1964	61 years, 294 days
Heinz Heydrich	Firearm	Riesenburg	November 19, 1944	39 years, 51 days
Heinrich Himmler†	Cyanide poisoning	Lüneburg	May 23, 1945	44 years, 228 days
Paul Hinkler	Cyanide poisoning	Nißmitz	April 13, 1945	52 years, 292 days
August Hirt	Firearm	Schluchsee	June 2, 1945	47 years, 35 days
Adolf Hitler*	Firearm	Berlin	April 30, 1945	56 years, 10 days
Hermann Höfle†	Hanging	Vienna, Austria	August 21, 1962	51 years, 63 days
Karl Jäger†	Hanging	Hohenasperg	June 22, 1959	70 years, 275 days
Dietrich von Jagow	Firearm	Meran, Operational Zone of the Alpine Foothills	April 26, 1945	53 years, 57 days
Arno Jahr	Firearm	Podgornoye, Soviet Union	January 21, 1943	52 years, 49 days
Hans Jeschonnek	Firearm	Rastenburg	August 18, 1943	44 years, 131 days
Rudolf Jung†	Hanging	Prague, Czechoslovakia	December 11, 1945	63 years, 239 days
Hugo Jury	Firearm	Zwettl, Austria	May 8, 1945	57 years, 299 days
Gustav Kastner-Kirdorf	Firearm	Berchtesgaden	May 4, 1945	64 years, 93 days
Manfred Freiherr von Killinger	Firearm	Bucharest, Romania	September 2, 1944	58 years, 50 days
Eberhard Kinzel*		Flensburg	May 23, 1945	47 years, 217 days
Matthias Kleinheisterkamp†		Halbe	April 29, 1945	51 years, 281 days
Günther von Kluge	Cyanide poisoning	Metz, France	August 17, 1944	61 years, 292 days
Arthur Kobus		Berlin	April 1945	66 years
Ilse Koch†	Hanging	Aichach	September 1, 1967	60 years, 344 days
Otto Carl Köcher†		Ludwigsburg	December 27, 1945	61 years, 346 days
Max Koegel†	Hanging	Schwabach	June 27, 1946	50 years, 254 days
Hans Krebs	Firearm	Berlin	May 2, 1945	47 years, 59 days
Friedrich-Wilhelm Krüger	Firearm	Eggelsberg, Austria	May 10, 1945	51 years, 2 days
Walter Krüger	Firearm	Liepāja, Latvia	May 22, 1945	55 years, 84 days
Hans Langsdorff	Firearm	Buenos Aires, Argentina	December 20, 1939	45 years, 275 days
Robert Ley†	Hanging	Nuremberg	October 25, 1945	55 years, 252 days
Willy Liebel	Firearm	Nuremberg	April 20, 1945	47 years, 232 days
Hans Loritz†		Neumünster	January 31, 1946	50 years, 50 days
Alfred Meyer		Hessisch Oldendorf	April 11, 1945	53 years, 188 days
Emil Heinrich Meyer		Berlin	May 9, 1945	59 years, 3 days
Walter Model	Firearm	Duisburg	April 21, 1945	54 years, 87 days
Ludwig Müller		Berlin	July 31, 1945	62 years, 38 days
Wilhelm Murr†	Cyanide poisoning	Egg, Austria	May 14, 1945	56 years, 149 days
Friedrich Mußgay†	Hanging	Stuttgart	September 3, 1946	54 years, 243 days
Hans-Ulrich von Oertzen	Hand grenade	Berlin	July 21, 1944	29 years, 137 days
Friedrich Panzinger†	Poison	Munich	August 8, 1959	56 years, 188 days
Heinrich Petersen		Czechoslovakia	May 9, 1945	41 years, 39 days
Hans Pfundtner*		Berlin	April 25, 1945	63 years, 284 days
Hans-Adolf Prützmann†	Cyanide poisoning	Lüneburg	May 21, 1945	43 years, 263 days
Carl Friedrich von Pückler-Burghauss	Firearm	Čimelice, Czechoslovakia	May 13, 1945	58 years, 218 days
Rudolf Querner†		Magdeburg	May 27, 1945	51 years, 351 days
Otto Rahn	Poison	Söll, Austria	March 13, 1939	35 years, 23 days
Wilhelm Rediess	Firearm	Oslo, Norway	May 8, 1945	44 years, 210 days
Hans Albin Freiherr von Reitzenstein		Soviet Union	November 30, 1943	32 years, 271 days
Heinz Roch		Trondheim, Norway	May 10, 1945	40 years, 113 days
Arthur Rödl	Hand grenade	Stettin	April 5, 1945	46 years, 296 days
Erwin Rommel	Cyanide poisoning	Herrlingen	October 14, 1944	52 years, 334 days
Meinoud Rost van Tonningen†	Jumping from a height	Scheveningen, Netherlands	June 6, 1945	51 years, 107 days
Curt Rothenberger	Hanging	Hamburg	September 1, 1959	63 years, 63 days
Joachim Rumohr	Firearm	Budapest, Hungary	February 11, 1945	34 years, 179 days
Bernhard Rust		Nübel	May 8, 1945	61 years, 220 days
Karl-Gustav Sauberzweig†	Poison	Hamburg	October 20, 1946	47 years, 49 days
Gerhard Schach	Firearm	Berlin	May 2, 1945	39 years, 55 days
Franz Schädle	Firearm	Berlin	May 1, 1945	38 years, 163 days
Walter Scherff†	Cyanide poisoning	Saalfelden, Austria	May 24, 1945	46 years, 204 days
Arno Schickedanz*	Firearm	Berlin	April 12, 1945	52 years, 106 days
Walter Schimana†	Hanging	Salzburg, Austria	September 12, 1948	50 years, 184 days
Hans Schleif*		Berlin	April 27, 1945	43 years, 63 days
Fritz Schmidt	Jumped (or fell) from moving train	Chartres, France	June 20, 1943	39 years, 213 days
Gustav Schmidt		Belgorod, Soviet Union	August 7, 1943	50 years, 105 days
Carl Schneider†	Hanging	Frankfurt	December 11, 1946	54 years, 357 days
Georg Scholze	Firearm	Berlin	April 23, 1945	47 years, 245 days
Otto von Schrader†		Bergen, Norway	July 19, 1945	57 years, 123 days
Werner Schrader	Firearm	Zossen	July 28, 1944	49 years, 143 days
Hans Schwedler		Hechendorf	May 2, 1945	66 years, 197 days
Heinrich Seetzen†	Cyanide poisoning	Blankenese	September 28, 1945	39 years, 98 days
Rudolf Sieckenius	Firearm	Teupitz	April 29, 1945	48 years, 254 days
Gustav Simon†	Hanging	Paderborn	December 18, 1945	45 years, 138 days
Jakob Sprenger*	Poison	Kössen, Austria	May 7, 1945	60 years, 287 days
Karl Steubl†		Linz, Austria	September 21, 1945	34 years, 331 days
Otto von Stülpnagel†	Hanging	Paris, France	February 6, 1948	69 years, 235 days
Ludwig Stumpfegger	Cyanide poisoning	Berlin	May 2, 1945	34 years, 295 days
Friedrich Suhr†		Wuppertal	May 31, 1946	39 years, 25 days
Otto Telschow†	Wrist slitting/Poison	Lüneburg	May 31, 1945	69 years, 93 days
Josef Terboven	Dynamite	Asker, Norway	May 8, 1945	46 years, 350 days
Otto Georg Thierack†	Poison	Paderborn	October 26, 1946	57 years, 190 days
Heinz Thilo†		Hohenelbe, Czechoslovakia	May 13, 1945	33 years, 217 days
Max Thomas		Wurzburg	December 6, 1945	54 years, 124 days
Henning von Tresckow	Hand grenade	Królowy Most, Poland	July 21, 1944	43 years, 193 days
Karl Fischer von Treuenfeld†		Stadtallendorf	June 7, 1946	61 years, 68 days
Ernst Udet	Firearm	Berlin	November 17, 1941	45 years, 205 days
Werner Villinger	Jumping from a height	near Innsbruck, Austria	August 8, 1961	73 years, 303 days
Albert Vögler	Cyanide poisoning	Herdecke	April 14, 1945	68 years, 65 days
Eduard Wagner	Firearm	Zossen	July 23, 1944	50 years, 113 days
Erich Wagner†		Oberkirch	March 22, 1959	46 years, 188 days
Ernst Weiner†	Firearm	Oslo, Norway	December 17, 1945	31–32 years
Josef Weinheber	Morphine overdose	Kirchstetten, Austria	April 8, 1945	53 years, 30 days
Jakob Weiseborn	Poison	Flossenbürg	January 20, 1939	46 years, 304 days
Eduard Weiter	Firearm	Itter Castle, Austria	May 2, 1945	55 years, 288 days
Eduard Wirths†	Hanging	Hövelhof	September 20, 1945	36 years, 16 days
Josef Witiska†	Poison	en route to Plzeň	October 16, 1946	52 years, 103 days
Karl Zech†		Altenburg	April 1, 1944	52 years, 55 days
August Zehender		Budapest, Hungary	February 11, 1945	41 years, 289 days
Peter Zschech	Firearm	Azores	October 24, 1943	25 years, 6 days

== See also ==
- Death of Adolf Hitler
- Mass suicides in Nazi Germany
