= List of minister-presidents of Brunswick =

This article lists the ministers of state (German: Staatsminister) in the Duchy of Brunswick from 1843 to 1918 and minister-presidents (German: Ministerpräsidenten) or equivalent office of the Free State of Brunswick from 1918 to 1946.

== Ministers of state of the Duchy of Brunswick ==
- 1843–1848: Werner Graf von Ventheim
- 1848: Johann Georg Christian von Koch
- 1848–1856: Wilhelm Johann Karl Heinrich Freiherr von Schleinitz
- 1856–1861: August von Geyso
- 1861–1874: Asche Burckhard Carl Ferdinand von Campe
- 1874–1883: Johann Christian Wilhelm Schulz
- 1883–1889: Wilhelm Otto Hans Görtz-Wrisberg
- 1889–1911: Albert von Otto
- 1911–1914: Leonhard Christoph Adolf von Hartwieg
- 1914–1918: Karl von Wolff

== Minister-presidents of the Free State of Brunswick ==
Political party: USPD SPD DNVP NSDAP None

| Portrait | Name (Birth–Death) | Term of office | | | Political party |
| Portrait | Name (Birth–Death) | Took office | Left office | Days | Political party |
President
| | August Ernst Reinhold Merges (1870–1945) | 9 November 1918 | 22 February 1919 | 105 | Independent Social Democratic Party of Germany |
Chairmen of the Council of People's Commissioners
| | Sepp Oerter (1870–1928) | 10 November 1918 | 13 April 1919 | 154 | Independent Social Democratic Party of Germany |
| | Heinrich Otto Jasper (1875–1945) | 17 April 1919 | 21 October 1919 | 187 | Social Democratic Party of Germany |
Ministers-President
| | Heinrich Otto Jasper (1875–1945); 1st term | 21 October 1919 | 22 June 1920 | 245 | Social Democratic Party of Germany |
| | Sepp Oerter (1870–1928) | 22 June 1920 | 25 November 1921 | 521 | Independent Social Democratic Party of Germany |
| | August Junke (1866–1926) | 25 November 1921 | 23 March 1922 | 118 | Independent Social Democratic Party of Germany |
| | Otto Friedrich Wilhelm Antrick (1858–1924) | 23 March 1922 | 23 May 1922 | 61 | Social Democratic Party of Germany |
| | Heinrich Otto Jasper (1875–1945); 2nd term | 23 May 1922 | 24 December 1924 | 946 | Social Democratic Party of Germany |
| | Gerhard Marquordt (1881–1950) | 24 December 1924 | 14 December 1927 | 1085 | Non-partisan |
| | Heinrich Otto Jasper (1875–1945); 3rd term | 14 December 1927 | 1 October 1930 | 1022 | Social Democratic Party of Germany |
| | Werner Küchenthal (1882–1976) | 1 October 1930 | 5 May 1933 | 947 | German National People's Party |
| | Dietrich Klagges (1891–1971) | 5 May 1933 | 12 April 1945 | 4360 | National Socialist German Workers' Party |
| | Wilhelm Friedrich Loeper (1883–1935) | Reichsstatthalter | | 901 | National Socialist German Workers' Party |
| | Wilhelm Friedrich Loeper (1883–1935) | 5 May 1933 | 23 October 1935 | 901 | National Socialist German Workers' Party |
| | Fritz Sauckel (1894–1946) | Acting Reichsstatthalter | | 567 | National Socialist German Workers' Party |
| | Fritz Sauckel (1894–1946) | October 1935 | 20 April 1937 | 567 | National Socialist German Workers' Party |
| | Rudolf Jordan (1902–1988) | Reichsstatthalter | | 2903 | National Socialist German Workers' Party |
| | Rudolf Jordan (1902–1988) | 20 April 1937 | April 1945 | 2903 | National Socialist German Workers' Party |
| | Hubert Schlebusch (1893–1955) | May 1945 | January 1946 | 245 | Social Democratic Party of Germany |
| | Alfred Kubel (1909–1999) | January 1946 | 9 December 1946 | 342 | Social Democratic Party of Germany |

== See also ==
- Minister-President of Lower Saxony
