= 1924 Anhalt state elections =

The 1924 Anhalt state elections may refer to

- June 1924 Anhalt state election
- November 1924 Anhalt state election
