= Ludwig Viereck =

German Nazi Party official (1892 – unknown)

Gauleiter of Harzgau later, Gau Magdeburg
- In office August 1925 – 1 September 1926
- Preceded by: Position established
- Succeeded by: Position abolished

Personal details
- Born: 11 February 1892 German Empire
- Died: Unknown
- Party: Nazi Party
- Occupation: Salesman

Ludwig Viereck (11 February 1892 – unknown) was a German Nazi Party official who served as the first Gauleiter of the "Harzgau", later Gau Magdeburg, for about a year in the Party's early days. After his removal from office, he resigned from the Party. Further details of his life are not known.

== Life ==
Little is known about Viereck's early life, other than that he was employed as a salesman. He joined the Nazi Party very shortly after the February 1925 lifting of the ban that had been imposed on it in the wake of Adolf Hitler's failed Beer Hall Putsch. The date of his enrollment was 12 June 1925 and he received the relatively low membership number of 7,392.

Viereck organized the Party Ortsgruppe (local group) in Halberstadt, the capital of the Harz district, and became the Ortsgruppenleiter there. By August 1925, this district was organized into the "Harzgau" with Viereck as Gauleiter. In April 1926, the Gau was renamed Gau Magdeburg. However, on 1 September 1926, his Gau was merged with two neighboring Gaue, Anhalt and Elbe-Havel, to form the expanded Gau Anhalt-North Saxony Province (later again renamed Gau Magdeburg-Anhalt) and Viereck lost out in the merger to the sitting Gauleiter of Gau Anhalt, Gustav Hermann Schmischke. Viereck subsequently resigned from the Party on 23 September.

The German historian Karl Höffkes states that some (unnamed) sources report that Viereck was expelled from the Party on 6 December 1926. Further details of his life are not known.

== Sources ==
- Höffkes, Karl (1986). Hitlers Politische Generale. Die Gauleiter des Dritten Reiches: ein biographisches Nachschlagewerk. Tübingen: Grabert-Verlag. ISBN 3-87847-163-7.
- Miller, Michael D.; Schulz, Andreas (2021). Gauleiter: The Regional Leaders of the Nazi Party and Their Deputies, 1925–1945. Vol. 3 (Fritz Sauckel – Hans Zimmermann). Fonthill Media. ISBN 978-1-781-55826-3.
