= Alfred Freyberg =

German Nazi politician & SS-Gruppenführer

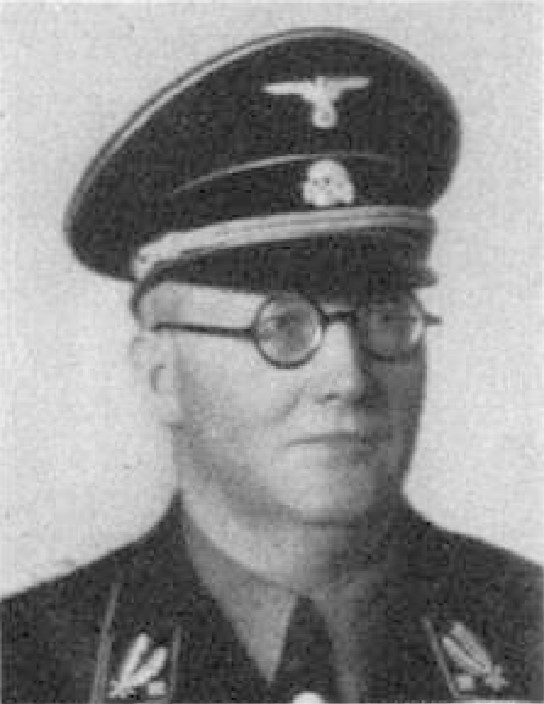
- Freyberg, (c. 1938)

Ministerpräsident Free State of Anhalt
- In office 21 May 1932 – 8 January 1940
- Preceded by: Heinrich Deist
- Succeeded by: Rudolf Jordan

Oberbürgermeister of Leipzig
- In office 21 August 1939 – 18 April 1945
- Preceded by: Rudolf Haake (Acting)
- Succeeded by: Wilhelm Johannes Vierling

Personal details
- Born: Bruno Erich Alfred Freyberg; 12 July 1892 Harsleben, Province of Saxony, Kingdom of Prussia, German Empire
- Died: 18 April 1945 (aged 52) Leipzig, Nazi Germany
- Cause of death: Suicide by cyanide poisoning
- Party: Nazi Party
- Spouse: Magdalena Schwannecke (1896–1945)
- Children: Wilhelm Friedrich (1923–1944); Barbara (1925–1945)
- Profession: Lawyer
- Civilian awards: Golden Party Badge

Military service
- Allegiance: German Empire; Nazi Germany
- Branch/service: Imperial German Army; Schutzstaffel
- Years of service: 1914–1917; 1933–1945
- Rank: Leutnant; SS-Gruppenführer
- Battles/wars: World War I
- Military awards: Iron Cross, 2nd class

Bruno Erich Alfred Freyberg (12 July 1892 – 18 April 1945) was a German lawyer, Nazi Party politician and SS-Gruppenführer who served as the Ministerpräsident of the Free State of Anhalt from 1932 to 1940 and the Oberbürgermeister (Lord Mayor) of Leipzig from 1939 to 1945. He committed suicide together with his family in the closing days of the Second World War in Europe.

== Early life ==
Freyberg was born the son of a farmer in Harsleben in the Harz district. He attended volksschule there and then went to the realgymnasium in Halberstadt. Beginning in 1911, he studied law at the University of Geneva, University of Königsberg, Ludwig-Maximilians-Universität München (LMU Munich) and Martin Luther University Halle-Wittenberg. At the beginning of the First World War, he left school and entered the German Imperial Army as a Kriegsfreiwilliger (war volunteer). He served in an artillery regiment and was promoted to Leutnant of reserves in March 1917. That same year he was seriously wounded near Verdun, was awarded the Iron Cross, 2nd class, and was discharged after his recovery.

Freyberg then returned to his studies and in 1918 passed the preliminary state law exam in Naumburg. Between 1918 and 1922 he worked as a Referendar (legal apprentice) in Wernigerode, Halberstadt and Naumburg and passed the final state law examination in Berlin in 1922. From 1923 he worked as a court assessor, first in the Reich tax administration office in Berlin, then transferring to the tax office in Halberstadt, the tax court in Magdeburg and the tax office in Quedlinburg. On 1 August 1924 he was appointed a Regierungsrat (Government Counselor).

== Nazi Party career ==
Freyberg joined the Nazi Party in Quedlinburg on 27 May 1925 (membership number 5,880) and founded the Ortsgruppe (Local Group) there, which he led until 1927 as Ortsgruppenleiter. As an early member of the Party, he would later be awarded the Golden Party Badge. Dismissed from the tax office in 1926 for his political activism, he went into private practice as a lawyer in Quedlinburg. From 1927 to 1929 he was a Party Bezirksleiter (District Leader). In 1929, he became a notary at the Higher Regional Court in Naumburg. In November 1929 he was elected a City Councilor and became the leader of the Nazi faction in the council. At the state election on 24 April 1932, the Nazis became the largest party in the landtag of the Free State of Anhalt, increasing their representation from one to fifteen seats. The Nazis formed a coalition government with the conservative German National People's Party (DNVP) on 21 May 1932 and Freyberg became the first Nazi Ministerpräsident of a state in the Weimar Republic. Following the Nazi seizure of power, Freyberg served as the sole Minister of State in Anhalt from April 1933 to January 1940.

On 22 November 1933, Freyberg joined the Schutzstaffel (SS) with the rank of SS-Obersturmbannführer (membership number 113,650). On 29 March 1936, he was elected as a Reichstag deputy from electoral constituency 10 (Magdeburg), was reelected on 10 April 1938 and served until his death. From 1938, he also worked in the headquarters of the Sicherheitsdienst (SD), the Nazi intelligence service headed by then SS-Gruppenführer Reinhard Heydrich. On 21 August 1939 Freyberg was appointed the Oberbürgermeister of the city of Leipzig, then Germany's sixth most populous city. He left his post at the head of the Anhalt state government on 8 January 1940, being succeeded by the Anhalt Reichsstatthalter (Reich Governor) Rudolf Jordan. Freyberg was a committed anti-Semite and his administration pursued policies of discrimination, exploitation and, ultimately, expulsion of Jews from Leipzig to the Auschwitz death camp. On his fiftieth birthday, 12 July 1942, Freyberg was promoted to SS-Gruppenführer by Adolf Hitler.

== Death ==
On 18 April 1945, one day before elements of the U.S. Army entered Leipzig, Freyberg committed suicide by cyanide poisoning in the Leipzig town hall together with his wife and 20-year-old daughter. The City Treasurer, Kurt Lisso, his wife and adult daughter also poisoned themselves there, as did former Oberbürgermeister Walter Dönicke.

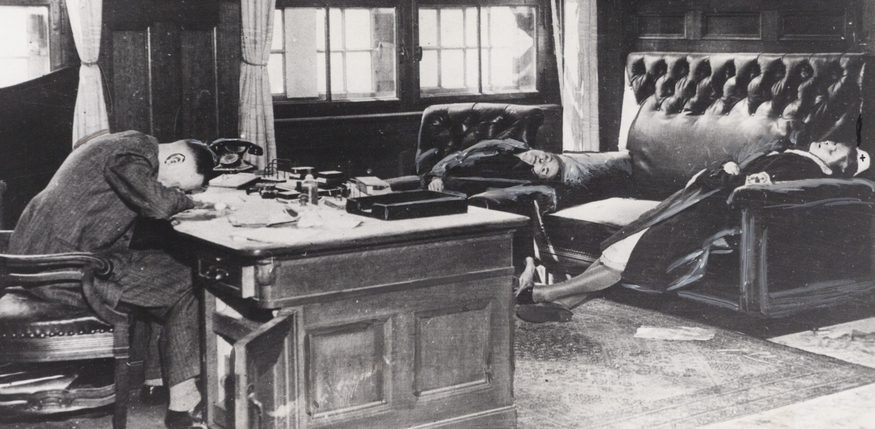
Alfred Freyberg, suicided in his Leipzig office with his wife and daughter

SS ranks
Date	Rank
22 November 1933	SS-Obersturmbannführer
20 April 1934	SS-Standartenführer
1 January 1935	SS-Oberführer
19 November 1936	SS-Brigadeführer
12 July 1942	SS-Gruppenführer

== See also ==
- List of mayors of Leipzig
- List of minister-presidents of Anhalt
- List of Nazi suicides

== Sources ==
- Klee, Ernst (2007). Das Personenlexikon zum Dritten Reich. Wer war was vor und nach 1945. Frankfurt-am-Main: Fischer-Taschenbuch-Verlag. ISBN 978-3-596-16048-8.
- Miller, Michael D.; Schulz, Andreas (2017). Gauleiter: The Regional Leaders of the Nazi Party and Their Deputies, 1925–1945. Vol. 2 (Georg Joel – Dr. Bernhard Rust). R. James Bender Publishing. ISBN 978-1-932-97032-6.
- Peschel, Andreas: Alfred Freyberg in Institute for Saxon History and Folklore: Saxon Biography
- Schiffer Publishing Ltd., ed. (2000). SS Officers List: SS-Standartenführer to SS-Oberstgruppenführer (As of 30 January 1942). Schiffer Military History Publishing. ISBN 0-7643-1061-5.
