= Alois Bachschmid =

German politician (1900–1968)

Gauleiter of Gau Elbe-Havel
- In office 25 November 1925 – 1 September 1926
- Preceded by: Position created
- Succeeded by: Position abolished

Personal details
- Born: Alois Anton Michael Bachschmid; 13 June 1900 Augsburg, Kingdom of Bavaria, German Empire
- Died: 21 August 1968 (aged 68) Bolzano, Italy
- Party: Nazi Party (NSDAP)
- Other political affiliations: Greater German People's Community
- Occupation: Salesman

Military service
- Allegiance: German Empire
- Branch/service: Royal Bavarian Army
- Years of service: 1918–1919
- Battles/wars: World War I

Alois Bachschmid (13 June 1900 – 21 August 1968), often mistakenly spelled Bachschmidt, was a German politician and early member of the Nazi Party who served as the Gauleiter of Gau Elbe-Havel in 1925–1926. He resigned from the Party in October 1926 but was readmitted in May 1937 and worked as a regional social welfare administrator.

== Life and career ==
Bachschmid was born in Augsburg in the Kingdom of Bavaria. From June to November 1918, he served in an infantry regiment of the Royal Bavarian Army in the last months of the First World War. Discharged from the military in January 1919, he worked as a salesman and business manager. Drawn to nationalist, conservative politics, he was an early adherent of the Nazi Party] in Swabia.

In the aftermath of the Beer Hall Putsch of November 1923, the Party officially was banned by the Weimar Republic. Bachschmid then joined the Greater German People's Community (Großdeutsche Volksgemeinschaft, GVG), a Nazi front organization set up in January 1924 by Alfred Rosenberg, on instructions from Adolf Hitler who was incarcerated in Landsberg prison. Bachschmid served as a member of the GVG executive committee. Other prominent Nazis who were GVG members included Max Amann, Hermann Esser and Julius Streicher.

In early 1925, Bachschmid served on a committee laying the groundwork for establishing an Ortsgruppe (local group) in Augsburg when the ban on the Party was eventually lifted. Hitler officially re-established the Party on 27 February 1925. Bachschmid joined it on 1 April 1925 and received the low membership number 76.

On 25 November 1925, Bachschmid was appointed Gauleiter of Gau Elbe-Havel in central Germany, with headquarters first in Magdeburg, and later in Brandenburg an der Havel. He served as the regional Party leader, reporting directly to Hitler and serving as his representative in the Gau. He remained in this position until 1 September 1926 when, on Hitler's order, the Gau was dissolved and merged with Gau Anhalt and Gau Magdeburg to form Gau Anhalt-North Saxony Province (later renamed Gau Magdeburg-Anhalt), under the leadership of Gustav Hermann Schmischke who had headed Gau Anhalt. On 26 October 1926, as a member of Ortsgruppe Magdeburg, Bachschmid resigned from the Party for unknown reasons.

After more than ten years of non-membership, Bachschmid was allowed to rejoin the Party on 1 May 1937. He received membership number 5,702,821, and he was assigned as a Gau-level administrator of the National Socialist People's Welfare. No additional details about his later life are known. He died at Bolzano in Italy in August 1968.

== Sources ==
- Höffkes, Karl (1986). Hitlers Politische Generale. Die Gauleiter des Dritten Reiches: ein biographisches Nachschlagewerk. Tübingen: Grabert-Verlag. ISBN 3-87847-163-7.
- Kershaw, Ian (2008). Hitler: A Biography. W.W. Norton & Co. ISBN 978-0-393-33761-7.
- Miller, Michael D.; Schulz, Andreas (2012). Gauleiter: The Regional Leaders of the Nazi Party and Their Deputies, 1925–1945. Vol. 1 (Herbert Albrecht – H. Wilhelm Hüttmann). R. James Bender Publishing. ISBN 978-1-932-97021-0.
- Michael Rademacher (2000): Handbuch der NSDAP-Gaue (1928–1945). Vechta, ISBN 3-8311-0216-3
