= Joachim Albrecht Eggeling =

German Nazi, Gauleiter, SS-Obergruppenführer (1884–1945)

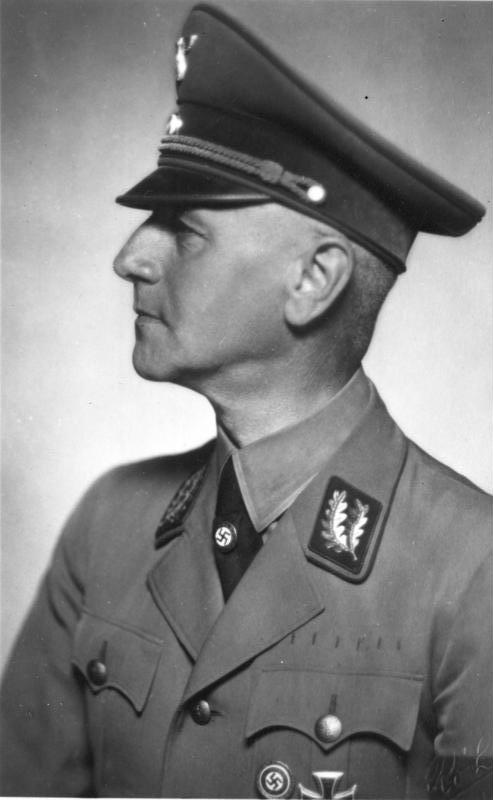
- Eggeling in 1936

Gauleiter of Halle-Merseburg
- In office 20 April 1937 – 15 April 1945
- Appointed by: Adolf Hitler
- Preceded by: Rudolf Jordan
- Succeeded by: Position abolished

Oberpräsident of Halle-Merseburg
- In office 18 August 1944 – 15 April 1945
- Preceded by: Position created
- Succeeded by: Position abolished

Acting Gauleiter of Magdeburg-Anhalt
- In office 23 October 1935 – 20 April 1937
- Appointed by: Adolf Hitler
- Preceded by: Wilhelm Friedrich Loeper
- Succeeded by: Rudolf Jordan

Deputy Gauleiter of Magdeburg-Anhalt
- In office 1933 – 10 February 1936
- Preceded by: Paul Hofmann
- Succeeded by: Rudolf Trautmann

Personal details
- Born: 30 November 1884 Blankenburg am Harz, Duchy of Brunswick, German Empire
- Died: 15 April 1945 (aged 60) Moritzburg Castle, Halle, Nazi Germany
- Cause of death: Suicide by gunshot
- Party: Nazi Party (NSDAP)
- Occupation: Soldier; Agriculturist

Military service
- Allegiance: German Empire
- Branch/service: Imperial German Army
- Years of service: 1904–1919
- Rank: Hauptmann
- Unit: 10th Hanoverian Jäger Battalion
- Battles/wars: World War I
- Awards: Iron Cross

Joachim Albrecht Leo Eggeling (30 November 1884 – 15 April 1945) was the German Nazi Gauleiter of Halle-Merseburg and the Oberpräsident (High President) of the Province of Halle-Merseburg. He was also an SS-Obergruppenführer.

== Early years ==
Eggeling was born in Blankenburg am Harz in the Duchy of Brunswick. A farmer's son, Eggeling went to the Bürgerschule (a type of vocational school once found in some parts of Germany) and the Gymnasium in Blankenburg. Between 1898 and 1904 he completed officer training at the cadet schools at Oranienstein and Groß-Lichterfelde.

He completed the cadet school and was commissioned Leutnant (Second lieutenant) in March 1904. Eggeling was subsequently assigned to the 10th Hanoverian Jäger Battalion in Goslar, Lower Saxony. He served with that unit until early 1913, when he was promoted to Oberleutnant (First lieutenant) and transferred to the 7th Machine Gun Detachment (Maschinengewehr Abteilung Nr. 7) assigned to the 1st Battalion of 158th Lorraine Infantry Regiment.

Following the outbreak of World War I, Eggeling was promoted to Hauptmann (Captain) in January 1915 and assumed command of the 5th Machine Gun Detachment (Maschinengewehr Abteilung Nr. 5) assigned to East Prussian 45th Infantry Regiment. He participated in the combats on the Eastern Front until the end of September 1916, when his Detachment was transferred to the Western Front.

While there, Eggeling participated in the combats in Belgium and France and was wounded three times. For his service during the War, he was awarded the Iron Cross, first and second class, both classes of Oldenburg Friedrich-August-Kreuz, and also received Austrian Military Merit Cross, 3rd Class with War Decoration.

After November 1918, he fought as a member of the Goslar riflemen against the left-wing Marxist Spartacus League in Hanover. In October 1919 Eggeling retired from the army and attended the Agricultural College at Halle until 1922. He completed his studies at the age of 35 and began work as an agriculturist. In November 1922 he was administering the state agricultural farm at Frose in Anhalt.

== Nazi Party career ==
Eggeling first joined the Nazi Party in September 1923 shortly before it was banned in the wake of the Beer Hall Putsch. He rejoined on 28 July 1925 (member number: 11,579) after the ban on the Party was lifted. He founded several ortsgruppen (local groups) in Anhalt in 1926, and from 1926 to 1930 was the agricultural policy advisor to the Gauleiter of Anhalt-Sachsen-Nord. In 1930, Eggeling organized the agrarian policy apparatus in Gau Magdeburg-Anhalt. In 1933 he was named Deputy Gauleiter for Gau Magdeburg-Anhalt. In May 1933, he became a member of the Anhalt State Council (Staatsrat). In June 1933 he was appointed provincial agricultural leader (Landesbauernführer) of both Anhalt and the Prussian Province of Saxony. Eggeling's skills so impressed his superiors that he was elected to the Reichstag from electoral constituency 10 (Magdeburg) in November, 1933. In 1934 he was appointed to the Prussian Provincial Council for the Province of Saxony.

After Gauleiter Wilhelm Friedrich Loeper's death on 23 October 1935, Eggeling, as Deputy Gauleiter, was charged with the leadership of the Gau's business, and was formally named Acting Gauleiter on 10 February 1936. Owing to this, he was granted leave from his job as a provincial agricultural leader at that time. In June of the same year, Eggeling joined the SS (membership number: 186,515). He was given the honorary rank of SS-Brigadeführer and attached to the staff of the Reichsführer-SS.

On 20 April 1937 Eggeling was appointed Gauleiter of Gau Halle-Merseburg, succeeding Rudolf Jordan. At the same time, he was elected to the Prussian State Council and promoted to SS-Gruppenführer. On 10 April 1938, he was elected to the Reichstag for constituency 11 (Merseburg). In April 1941, he became a member of the Reich Advisory Council for Food and Agriculture. On 16 November 1942, he was named Reich Defense Commissioner for his Gau.

On 21 June 1943, Eggeling was promoted to SS-Obergruppenführer. On 18 August 1944 he was appointed Oberpräsident of the newly created Province of Halle-Merseburg. He thus united under his control the highest party and governmental offices in the province. In September 1944, he assumed command of the recently established Volkssturm units in his Gau. On 13 April, 1945, convinced of the futility of defending the town of Halle, overcrowded with thousands of refugees, from the advancing American troops, Eggeling traveled to the Führerbunker to try and get Adolf Hitler to rescind his unconditional order to defend to the death. He first raised the issue of a peaceful handover of the city with Martin Bormann, Personal Secretary to the Führer, who warned Eggeling that this would result in his execution and the extermination of his family. At their meeting, Hitler ordered Eggeling to continue to defend the city to the last man. Having failed in his mission, Eggeling returned to Halle and committed suicide by gunshot at Moritzburg Castle on 15 April.

== Awards and decorations ==
- 1914 Iron Cross, second and first class
- 1914 Wound Badge in black
- Friedrich-August-Kreuz, second and first class
- Austrian Military Merit Cross, 3rd Class with War Decoration
- Honour Cross of the World War 1914/1918
- Golden Party Badge
- War Merit Cross Second Class and First Class without swords
- SS Honour Ring
- Sword of honour of the Reichsführer-SS

== See also ==
- Glossary of Nazi Germany
- List of Nazi Party leaders and officials
