= Paul Hofmann (Gauleiter) =

Nazi Party official (1901–1980)

Gauleiter of Gau Magdeburg-Anhalt
- In office 15 July 1932 – 15 December 1932
- Preceded by: Wilhelm Friedrich Loeper
- Succeeded by: Wilhelm Friedrich Loeper

Bürgermeister of Dessau
- In office 22 August 1932 – 12 April 1933

Personal details
- Born: 24 August 1901 Meißen, Kingdom of Saxony, German Empire
- Died: 16 October 1980 (aged 79) Wilmersdorf, West Berlin, West Germany
- Party: Nazi Party (NSDAP)
- Other political affiliations: Social People's Party; All-German Bloc/League of Expellees and Deprived of Rights
- Occupation: Soldier

Military service
- Allegiance: Weimar Republic
- Branch/service: Reichsheer
- Years of service: 1920–1930
- Battles/wars: Freikorps Baltic Campaign

Paul Hofmann (24 August 1901 – 16 October 1980) was a Nazi Party official who served briefly as Gauleiter of Gau Magdeburg-Anhalt.

== Early life ==
After attending elementary school and high school in Dresden through 1918, he studied at a teacher's college (Lehrerseminar). However, in 1919 he enlisted in the Iron Division of the Freikorps and was deployed in the Baltic States campaign. From 1920 to October 1930 he was a soldier in the Reichswehr.

== Nazi career ==
Hofmann left military service on 31 October 1930, and on 1 November he joined the Nazi Party (membership number 359,542). On 1 December he became Ortsgruppenleiter (Local Group Leader) in Dessau. At the same time, he was named as the Gau Business Manager for Gau Magdeburg-Anhalt. In 1931 he was appointed Gau Organization Leader and Gau Propaganda Leader. The next year, he was named Deputy Gauleiter.

On 15 July 1932 when Gauleiter Wilhelm Friedrich Loeper was temporarily promoted to the new position of Landesinspekteur overseeing several Gaue, Hofmann succeeded him as Gauleiter. However his tenure was brief, as by mid-December this new position had been abolished and Loeper returned as Gauleiter. Hofmann returned to his positions as Deputy Gauleiter and Propaganda Leader.

Hofmann had been elected to the Anhalt Landtag in April 1932. On 22 August 1932, he was also elected as the First City Councilor of Dessau, a position also referred to as Bürgermeister. After the Nazi seizure of power, Hofmann ordered works by Leon Trotsky, Erich Maria Remarque and other Communists and pacifists removed from the Dessau city library. Meanwhile, conflicts developed between himself and Gauleiter Loeper, which led to Hofmann resigning all Party posts at the end of March 1933. On 12 April of the same year he also resigned as Bürgermeister of Dessau.

On 1 November 1933, he took a job with the National Socialist Factory Cell Organization (NSBO) at the Junkers aircraft factory in Dessau and on 1 December 1934, he worked in the central office of the German Labour Front. He was later taken into protective custody after an investigation into alleged close ties between some Junkers plant personnel and Communist sympathizers. Little is known of his activities throughout the war years.

== Postwar life ==
Hofmann reentered political life after the war, heading the West Berlin branch of Tatgemeinschaft Freie Deutscher (Free Germans Association) a union of right-wing conservatives. In 1953 he helped found the Social People's Party, which in 1954 merged with the All-German Bloc/League of Expellees and Deprived of Rights, a right wing political party that attracted many ex-Nazis. Hofmann became deputy chairman (1954-1955) and chairman (1955-1957) of the Party's Berlin Regional Association. From 1957 to 1959 he was Chairman of the Berlin State Association of the All German Union.

== Sources ==
- Höffkes, Karl (1986). Hitlers Politische Generale. Die Gauleiter des Dritten Reiches: ein biographisches Nachschlagewerk. Tübingen: Grabert-Verlag. ISBN 3-87847-163-7.
- Miller, Michael D.; Schulz, Andreas (2012). Gauleiter: The Regional Leaders of the Nazi Party and Their Deputies, 1925-1945. Vol. I (Herbert Albrecht - H. Wilhelm Hüttmann). R. James Bender Publishing. ISBN 978-1-932970-21-0.
