= Wilhelm Friedrich Loeper =

German military officer, later a Nazi Party politician (1883–1935)

Gauleiter, Gau Magdeburg-Anhalt
- In office 1 April 1927 – 23 October 1935
- Preceded by: Gustav Hermann Schmischke
- Succeeded by: Joachim Albrecht Eggeling

Reichsstatthalter, Free State of Anhalt
- In office 5 May 1933 – 23 October 1935
- Prime Minister: Alfred Freyberg
- Preceded by: Position created
- Succeeded by: Fritz Sauckel

Reichsstatthalter, Free State of Brunswick
- In office 5 May 1933 – 23 October 1935
- Prime Minister: Dietrich Klagges
- Preceded by: Position created
- Succeeded by: Fritz Sauckel

Legislative positions
- 1933–1935: Reichstag Deputy
- 1930–1933: Reichstag Deputy
- 1928–1933: Free State of Anhalt Landtag Deputy

Personal details
- Born: 13 October 1883 Schwerin, Grand Duchy of Mecklenburg-Schwerin, German Empire
- Died: 23 October 1935 (aged 52) Dessau, Nazi Germany
- Cause of death: Cancer
- Party: Nazi Party
- Profession: Military officer
- Civilian awards: Blood Order; Golden Party Badge

Military service
- Allegiance: German Empire; Weimar Republic
- Branch/service: Imperial German Army; Freikorps; Reichswehr
- Years of service: 1903–1924
- Rank: Hauptmann
- Unit: Pioneer battalions 3, 23, 4, 19 & 2
- Battles/wars: World War I Spartakus uprising
- Military awards: Iron Cross, 1st and 2nd class Mecklenburg-Schwerin Military Merit Cross; Frederickscross; Wound Badge

Wilhelm Friedrich Loeper (13 October 1883 – 23 October 1935) was a German military officer under the German Empire and the Weimar Republic. He was also a Nazi Party politician who participated in the Beer Hall Putsch and later served as the Gauleiter of Gau Magdeburg-Anhalt and as the Reichsstatthalter of the free states of Anhalt and Brunswick.

== Early life and military career ==
Born in Schwerin the son of a pharmacist, Loeper attended Volksschule at Rosslau and received his Abitur from the Friedrichs Gymnasium at Dessau in 1903. He enlisted in the Imperial German Army as a Fahnenjunker (officer candidate) with Pioneer Battalion 3 in Spandau and then attended the War School at Neiße (today, Nysa, Poland). In August 1904, he was commissioned as a Leutnant and, after various postings, attended the Militärtechnische Akademie in Berlin-Charlottenburg between 1906 and 1908. Promoted to Oberleutnant in August 1912, he served briefly with Pioneer Battalion 23. For the next year he served with Infantry Regiment 150 in Allenstein (today, Olsztyn) and then was transferred to Pioneer Battalion 4 in Magdeburg, where he took command of a searchlight platoon in October 1913.

After the outbreak of the First World War, Loeper was deployed between 1914 and 1918 on the western front. Promoted to Hauptmann in November 1914, he served as a company and battalion commander with Pioneer Battalion 19. He was wounded in the head by shrapnel and was decorated with both classes of the Iron Cross, both classes of the Military Merit Cross from Mecklenburg-Schwerin, the Friedrich Cross from Anhalt, and the Wound Badge in black.

After the war ended, Loeper remained in the military as the leader of a Freikorps unit that saw deployment both in the Baltic States and the Ruhr area. In this capacity, he was involved in quelling the Spartakus uprising. Loeper was accepted into the Reichswehr, the armed forces of the Weimar Republic, in 1920 and became a company commander in Pioneer Battalion 2. In April 1923, he worked as an instructor at the Pioneer School in Munich, and got to know Adolf Hitler. Loeper took part in the Beer Hall Putsch of 9 November 1923, and sought to enlist support for the coup from his commanding officer. After the putsch failed, Loeper was discharged from the Reichswehr in February 1924. However, after the Nazis came to power, he was awarded the Blood Order in recognition of his participation.

== Nazi Party career ==
Loeper joined the Nazi Party in 1925 (membership number 6,980). As an early party member, he later would be awarded the Golden Party Badge. He moved to Dessau in Gau Anhalt and became the Ortsgruppenleiter (Local Group Leader) there. In the same year, he became the Gau's Deputy Business Manager. In September 1926, he advanced to Organization Leader, Propaganda Leader and Deputy Gauleiter. Finally, on 1 April 1927, he became Gauleiter of the now enlarged Gau Anhalt-Provinz Sachsen-Nord, succeeding Gustav Hermann Schmischke. The Gau was renamed Gau Magdeburg-Anhalt on 1 October 1928. Loeper gave himself over to building the Party up in his Gau, and fought against the Bauhaus, which was located in Dessau at that time. In a letter in 1930 he wrote "the Bauhaus belongs to Jerusalem and not to Dessau". Loeper later had a decisive part in stripping this institution of its assets.

In 1928, Loeper was elected as a member of the Anhalt Landtag. In January 1930, he became leader of the Nazi Party's personnel office at the Party headquarters in the Brown House in Munich. In September 1930, Loeper was also elected a member of the Reichstag for electoral district 10 (Magdeburg), and would hold this seat until his death. Anhalt had a Nazi Land government as early as May 1932 headed by Alfred Freyberg, and in that year Loeper published the first issue of the Nazi newspaper Trommler (Drummer) and established the publishing house Trommler-Verlag. In 1932, he instituted the first Stammabteilung (main department) and the Führerschule (leadership school) of the Voluntary Labour Service at Dessau's Schloß Großkühnau.

On 15 July 1932, came Loeper's appointment as Landesinspekteur for Central Germany-Brandenburg. In this position, he had oversight responsibility for his Gau and three others (Brandenburg, Halle-Merseburg & Ostmark). This was a short-lived initiative by Gregor Strasser to centralize control over the Gaue. However, it was unpopular with the Gauleiters and was repealed on Strasser's resignation in December 1932. Loeper then returned to his Gauleiter position in Magdeburg-Anhalt.

After the Nazis' nationwide seizure of power in January 1933, Loeper was appointed Reichsstatthalter (Reich Governor) for the Free States of Brunswick and Anhalt on 5 May. He set up office in Dessau and, in May, he also was named an honorary Gau leader of the Reichsarbeitsdienst. Also in 1933, the city of Magdeburg made him an honorary citizen, a distinction of which he was posthumously stripped in 1946. On 9 February 1934, he was officially enrolled in the SS (SS number 142,592) and appointed an honorary SS-Gruppenführer. In September 1935, he became a member of Hans Frank's Academy for German Law.

On 23 October 1935, Loeper died of neck cancer. At the funeral on 26 October, Hitler himself delivered the eulogy. The burial took place in the Napoleonsturm (Mildensee) (Napoleon Tower) in Mildensee, today a section of Dessau. Various honours were conveyed upon him: the SS-Standarte 59 was given the honour title Loeper, and the Magdeburg borough of Ottersleben renamed a street Hauptmann-Loeper-Straße. After the Nazi régime fell, all honours quickly were revoked. His body was reburied in Mildersee cemetery.

== Sources ==
- Christopeit, Gerald: Magdeburger Biographisches Lexikon, 2002, Magdeburg, ISBN 3-933046-49-1.
- Miller, Michael D.; Schulz, Andreas (2017). Gauleiter: The Regional Leaders of the Nazi Party and Their Deputies, 1925-1945. Vol. II (Georg Joel - Dr. Bernhard Rust). R. James Bender Publishing. ISBN 978-1-932970-32-6.
- Orlow, Dietrich (1969). The History of the Nazi Party: 1919-1933. University of Pittsburgh Press. ISBN 0-8229-3183-4.
