= Gustav Hermann Schmischke =

German Nazi Gauleiter (1883 – unknown)

Gauleiter Gau Anhalt
- In office 17 July 1925 – 1 September 1926
- Appointed by: Adolf Hitler
- Preceded by: Dr. Tesch
- Succeeded by: Position abolished

Gauleiter Gau Anhalt-North Saxony Province
- In office 1 September 1926 – 1 April 1927
- Appointed by: Adolf Hitler
- Preceded by: Position created
- Succeeded by: Wilhelm Friedrich Loeper

Personal details
- Born: 19 December 1883 Reichertswalde, Province of East Prussia, Kingdom of Prussia, German Empire
- Died: unknown
- Party: Nazi Party
- Education: University of Heidelberg
- Profession: Physician

Gustav Hermann Schmischke (born 19 December 1883 - death date unknown) was the Nazi Party Gauleiter of Gau Anhalt and, later, Gau Anhalt-North Saxony Province (Gau Anhalt-Provinz Sachsen Nord).

== Early life ==
Schmischke was born in Reichertswalde, East Prussia (today the village of Markowo, Ostróda County, Poland). He attended volksschule and gymnasium through 1903. He then studied at the University of Heidelberg, earning a degree in medicine in 1910. In 1913, he went into private practice as a general practitioner. In 1924 he was elected to the Landtag of Anhalt, serving until 1928.

== Nazi Party career ==
On 6 July 1925 Schmischke joined the Nazi Party (membership number 9,355) and on 17 July 1925 he was entrusted with the leadership of Gau Anhalt, replacing Dr. Tesch of Bernburg as Gauleiter. He worked at strengthening the internal cohesion of the Party and building a more efficient organization, and succeeded in forming several new local branches.

On 1 September 1926, Schmischke's jurisdiction was enlarged by a merger with the two neighboring Gaue of Magdeburg and Elbe-Havel. The new district was named Gau Anhalt-North Saxony Province. However, after differences developed between Schmischke and the Ortsgruppe (Local Group) in Dessau, he submitted his resignation on 28 February 1927. This was approved on 1 April 1927 and he was succeeded by his Deputy Gauleiter, Wilhelm Friedrich Loeper.

Schmischke subsequently served as the Gau Representative for Population and Racial Policy. In 1935 he became the department head in the Party's Office of Public Health in Gau Magdeburg-Anhalt. In November 1941 he was named Gaugesundsheitsführer (Gau Health Leader). Schmischke was a recipient of the Golden Party Badge. Nothing further is known of his subsequent life.

== Sources ==
- Höffkes, Karl (1986). Hitlers Politische Generale. Die Gauleiter des Dritten Reiches: ein biographisches Nachschlagewerk. Tübingen: Grabert-Verlag. ISBN 3-87847-163-7.
- Miller, Michael D.; Schulz, Andreas (2021). Gauleiter: The Regional Leaders of the Nazi Party and Their Deputies. Vol. 3. Fonthill Media. ISBN 978-1-781-55826-3.
- Mühlberger, Detlef (2004). Hitler's Voice: The Völkischer Beobachter, 1920-1933, Vol. I, Organisation & Development of the Nazi Party. Bern: Peter Lang. ISBN 0-8204-5909-7.
