= Gau Halle-Merseburg =

Administrative division of Nazi Germany from 1933 to 1945

- Gau of Nazi Germany
- 1925–1945
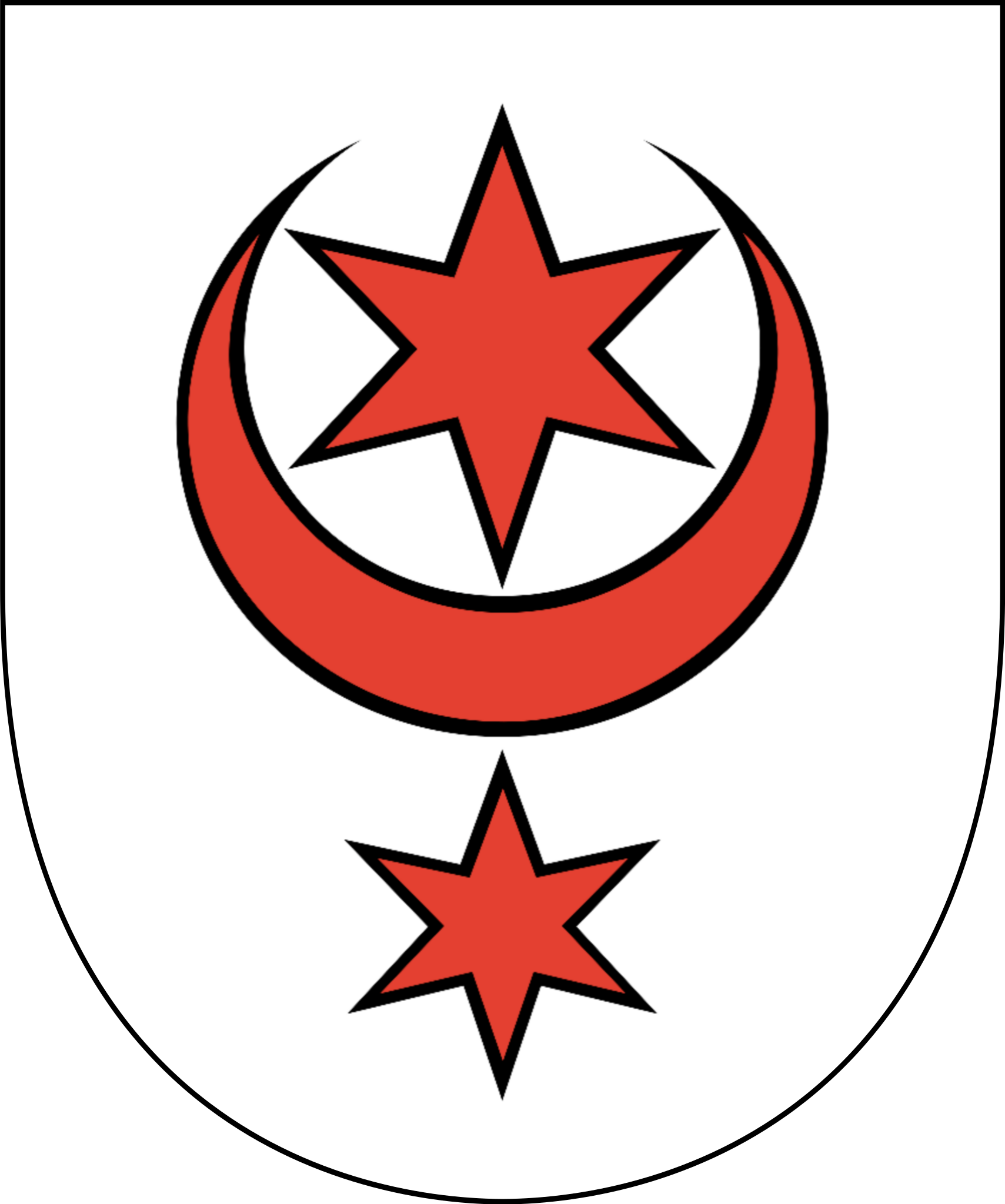
- Flag Coat of arms

- Capital: Halle
- Government
- Gauleiter
  - 1925–1926: Walter Ernst
  - 1926–1931: Paul Hinkler
  - 1931–1937: Rudolf Jordan
  - 1937–1945: Joachim Albrecht Eggeling
- History
  - Establishment: 27 June 1925
  - Disestablishment: 8 May 1945
Preceded by	Succeeded by
Province of Saxony	Saxony-Anhalt (1945-1952)
- Today part of: Germany

The Gau Halle-Merseburg was an administrative division of Nazi Germany from 1933 to 1945 in the Prussian Province of Saxony. Before that, from 1925 to 1933, it was the regional subdivision of the Nazi Party in that area.

== History ==
The Nazi Gau (plural Gaue) system was originally established in a party conference on 22 May 1926, in order to improve administration of the party structure. From 1933 onwards, after the Nazi seizure of power, the Gaue increasingly replaced the German states as administrative subdivisions in Germany.

At the head of each Gau stood a Gauleiter, a position which became increasingly more powerful, especially after the outbreak of the Second World War, with little interference from above. Local Gauleiters often held government positions as well as party ones and were in charge of, among other things, propaganda and surveillance and, from September 1944 onward, the Volkssturm and the defense of the Gau.

The position of Gauleiter in Halle-Merseburg was initially held by Walter Ernst from 1925 to 1926, followed by Paul Hinkler from 1926 to 1931 and Rudolf Jordan from 1931 to 1937. Joachim Albrecht Eggeling was the final Gauleiter, holding the position from 1937 to 1945. The first two Gauleiters, Ernst and Hinkler, both died in the final month of the war, the former killed in action, the latter through suicide. Jordan, the third Gauleiter, was sentenced to 25 years prison in the Soviet Union after the war but released in 1955 and died in 1988. He published his autobiography about his time as Gauleiter and in captivity which showed no indication that he was willing to take responsibility for the events in Nazi Germany. Eggeling, attempting to prevent the city of Halle from destruction, unsuccessfully petitioned the Nazi leadership in April 1945 to be permitted to not defend the city. After the refusal, Eggeling shot himself on 15 April 1945 with the city taken by the US Army on 19 April.
