= Markowo, Ostróda County =

Markowo
- Village
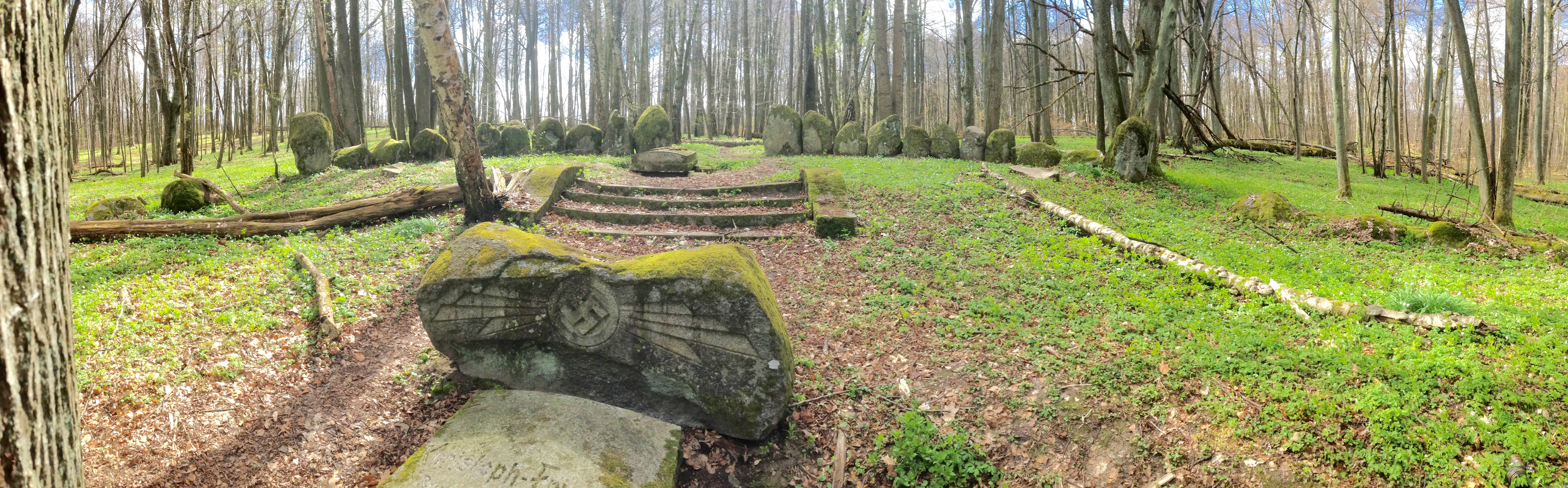
- Graveyard in Markowo

- Location within Poland
- Coordinates: 54°11′9″N 19°54′13″E
- Country: Poland
- Voivodeship: Warmian-Masurian
- County: Ostróda
- Gmina: Morąg
- Population: 410

Markowo [marˈkɔvɔ] is a village in the administrative district of Gmina Morąg, within Ostróda County, Warmian-Masurian Voivodeship, in northern Poland.
