= Rudolf Jordan (politician) =

German Nazi politician (1902–1988)

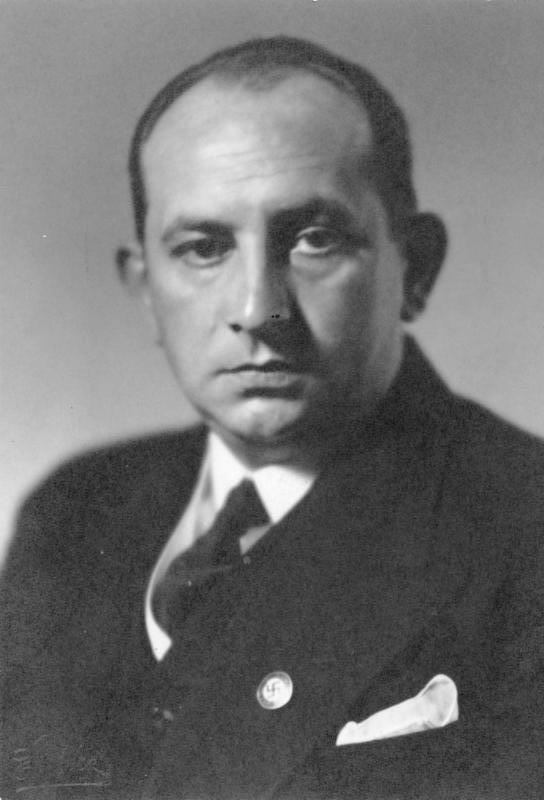
- Portrait of Jordan (1933)

Gauleiter of Gau Halle-Merseburg
- In office 19 January 1931 – 20 April 1937
- Preceded by: Paul Hinkler
- Succeeded by: Joachim Albrecht Eggeling

Gauleiter of Gau Magdeburg-Anhalt
- In office 20 April 1937 – 2 May 1945
- Preceded by: Joachim Albrecht Eggeling
- Succeeded by: Position abolished

Reichsstatthalter of the Free State of Anhalt
- In office 20 April 1937 – 2 May 1945
- Preceded by: Fritz Sauckel
- Succeeded by: Position abolished

Reichsstatthalter of the Free State of Brunswick
- In office 20 April 1937 – 2 May 1945
- Preceded by: Fritz Sauckel
- Succeeded by: Position abolished

Minister-President of the Free State of Anhalt
- In office 1 January 1940 – 2 May 1945
- Preceded by: Alfred Freyberg
- Succeeded by: Position abolished

Oberpräsident of the Province of Magdeburg
- In office 1 July 1944 – 2 May 1945
- Preceded by: Position established
- Succeeded by: Position abolished

Personal details
- Born: 21 June 1902 Großenlüder, Kingdom of Prussia, German Empire
- Died: 27 October 1988 (aged 86) Munich, Bavaria, West Germany
- Party: Nazi Party (NSDAP)
- Profession: Volksschule teacher

Rudolf Jordan (21 June 1902 – 27 October 1988) was the Gauleiter in Halle-Merseburg and Magdeburg-Anhalt in Nazi Germany. After the war, he was sentenced to 25 years in a Soviet Union labour camp. He was released from the camp in October 1955, and died in Munich in 1988.

== Early life ==
Jordan was born in Großenlüder, Hesse-Nassau. His family's background was in farming, although his father was also a salesman. After finishing volksschule, Jordan became a worker in the armament industry between 1916 and 1918. He earned so much money doing this that after the First World War, he found himself able to begin training as a teacher in Fulda. He nevertheless got involved in the military, serving from 1920 to 1922 as a temporary volunteer in the Reichswehr. In 1922, Jordan became a member of the Freikorps Oberland, and alongside this service ended his teacher training in 1924. At 22, he was already a Volksschule teacher.

The high joblessness rate in the Weimar Republic at that time, kept him from finding a teaching job, leading him to take such jobs as workman, office worker or freelancer, among others, at publishing houses and in advertising. Only in 1927 was he able to obtain a teaching job. He worked as a teacher at, among other schools, the "Army Vocational School for Economics and Administration" ("Heeresfachschule für Wirtschaft und Verwaltung") in Fulda.

Already by 1924, Jordan was active as a speaker for the Völkisch-Social Bloc and the Deutschvölkische Reichspartei, without ever becoming a member of either one. Through these rather nationalistically oriented groups, Jordan came into contact with the Nazi Party (NSDAP), which he joined on 15 May 1925 (membership number 4,871).

In 1925, he was the founder and editor of the Völkisch monthly Notung. Jordan's first writings came out:

- "Der wissenschaftliche Sozialismus" ("Scientific Socialism") 1925
- "Deutschland als Kolonie der Wallstreet" ("Germany as Wall Street's Colony") 1925

In 1926, he emigrated to Australia, returning to Germany in 1927.

== Nazi Party career ==
Between 1929 and January 1931, Jordan served as the Party Ortsgruppenleiter (local group leader) in Fulda. On 17 November 1929, he was elected to Kassel's municipal parliament and Hesse-Nassau's provincial Landtag as an NSDAP member where he would serve until 1931. Also in November 1929, Jordan founded the Party newspaper Der Fuldaer Beobachter (The Fulda Observer) whose name was freely borrowed from the Party's official paper, the Völkischer Beobachter. In December 1929, he was elected as Fulda's only NSDAP city councillor. Owing to his political activities, he was dismissed from his teaching job on 22 December 1929. In 1930, Jordan was made Aussenpolitischer Schriftleiter (foreign policy editor) of the NSDAP Gau newspaper Der Sturm (The Storm) whose offices were in Kassel.

On 19 January 1931, Jordan was summoned to Munich by Gregor Strasser, the Reichsorganisationsleiter, and was personally met by Adolf Hitler who appointed him Gauleiter of Halle-Merseburg in the Province of Saxony. In April 1932, he was elected to the Saxon provincial Landtag. On 6 June 1932, Jordan wrote to Strasser concerning the alleged Jewish origins of Reinhard Heydrich, the head of the Sicherheitsdienst, the intelligence service of the SS. Strasser passed Jordan's letter to the NSDAP's chief racial investigator, Dr. Achim Gercke, who dismissed the allegation on 22 June.

Despite this, Jordan continued his rise within the Party ranks, serving in the Landtag of Prussia between 24 April 1932 and 14 October 1933, and being elected to its executive council in March 1933. That month he also became the leader of the Nazi faction in both the Saxon provincial Landtag and the municipal parliament of Halle. He also was named the plenipotentiary for Saxony to the Reichsrat from 12 March 1933 until its abolition on 14 February 1934. On 11 July 1933, Jordan was appointed to the Prussian State Council. He also became the editor of the Mitteldeutschen Nationalzeitung in Halle and the weekly Der Kampf (The Struggle).

On 12 November 1933 Jordan was elected as a member of the Reichstag from electoral constituency 11, Merseburg. He became an SA-Gruppenführer on 3 April 1934 and was assigned to SA Standarte 36. On 4 September 1935, he was made a member of the Academy for German Law. On 20 April 1937, Hitler personally appointed him Reichsstatthalter (Reich Governor) for both the Free State of Brunswick and the Free State of Anhalt, as well as NSDAP Gauleiter of Magdeburg-Anhalt. Jordan was succeeded as Gauleiter of Halle-Merseburg by Joachim Albrecht Eggeling whom he replaced in Magdeburg-Anhalt. At 10 April 1938 Reichstag election, Jordan was returned for electoral constituency 10, Magdeburg. On 9 November of the same year came Jordan's promotion to SA-Obergruppenführer.

On the outbreak of the Second World War on 1 September 1939, Jordan was named Reich Defense Commissioner for Wehrkreis (Military District) XI, which encompassed his Gau along with most all of Gau Southern Hanover-Brunswick and part of Gau Eastern Hanover. This gave him control of civil defense matters over a large area. Additionally, on 1 January 1940, Jordan was named Minister-President of the Anhalt State Government, succeeding Alfred Freyberg. He was one the few individuals to simultaneously hold the posts of Reichsstatthalter and Minister-President. On 16 November 1942, the jurisdiction of the Reich Defense Commissioners was changed from the Wehrkreis to the Gau level, and Jordan remained Commissioner for only his Gau.

On 1 July 1944 came Jordan's last leap up the career ladder when he was appointed Oberpräsident (High President) of the Province of Magdeburg, thus uniting under his control all the highest party and governmental offices in his jurisdictions. On 25 September 1944, Jordan became the commander of the Nazi Volkssturm forces in his Gau. In the war's dying days, on 2 May 1945, Jordan dissolved the Gau staff, disbanded the local Volkssturm and managed to go underground with his family under a false name.

== Post-war life ==
On 30 May 1945, he was arrested by the British, and in July of the next year, the Western Allies handed him over to the Soviets. Late in 1950 – after four years in custody in the Soviet occupation zone – Jordan was sentenced to serve 25 years in a Soviet Union labour camp. West German Chancellor Konrad Adenauer, on a visit to Moscow, managed to persuade the Soviets to reconsider Jordan's sentence and he was released on 13 October 1955. In the years that followed, Jordan earned a living as a sales representative, and worked as an administrator for an aircraft manufacturing firm. He died in Munich. He published his autobiography about his time as Gauleiter and in captivity, "Experienced and Suffered. A Gauleiter's Way from Munich to Moscow", which showed no indication that he was willing to take responsibility for the events in Nazi Germany.

== Publications after the war ==
- 1971: "Erlebt und erlitten. Weg eines Gauleiters von München nach Moskau" ("Experienced and Suffered. A Gauleiter's Way from Munich to Moscow")
- 1974: "Im Zeugenstand der Geschichte. Antworten zum Thema Hitler" ("On History's Witness Stand. Answers on the Topic of Hitler")
- 1984: "Der 30. Juni 1934. Die sog. "Röhm-Revolte" und ihre Folgen aus der Sicht eines Erlebniszeugen" ("The 30 June 1934. The so-called "Röhm Revolt" and its Aftermath from a Witness's Point of View")

== Awards and decorations ==
- Golden Hitler Youth Badge with Oak Leaves
- Honour Chevron for the Old Guard
- Golden Party Badge
- NSDAP Long Service Award in Bronze, c.1940
- NSDAP Long Service Award in Silver, c.1940
- NSDAP Long Service Award in Gold, c.1941
- War Merit Cross 2nd Class without Swords
- War Merit Cross 1st Class without Swords

== Sources ==
- Broszat, Martin (1981). The Hitler State: The Foundation and Development of the Internal Structure of the Third Reich. New York: Longman Inc. ISBN 0-582-49200-9.
- Miller, Michael D.; Schulz, Andreas (2017). Gauleiter: The Regional Leaders of the Nazi Party and Their Deputies, 1925-1945. Vol. 2 (Georg Joel - Dr. Bernhard Rust). R. James Bender Publishing. ISBN 978-1-932-97032-6.
