= Podgornoye =

Podgornoye Подгорное
- Village
- Location within Altai Republic Location within Russia
- Coordinates: 52°01′N 85°53′E
- Country: Russia
- Region: Altai Republic
- District: Mayminsky District
- Time zone: UTC+7:00

Podgornoye (Russian: Подгорное; Altay: Бабырган, Babırgan) is a rural locality (a selo) in Mayminskoye Rural Settlement of Mayminsky District, the Altai Republic, Russia. The population was 546 as of 2016. There are 18 streets.

== Geography ==
Podgornoye is located on the left bank of the Katun River, 15 km north of Mayma (the district's administrative centre) by road. Platovo is the nearest rural locality.
