= Paul Hinkler =

German politician and police officer (1892–1945)

Gauleiter of Halle-Merseburg
- In office 25 July 1926 – 19 January 1931
- Appointed by: Adolf Hitler
- Preceded by: Walter Ernst
- Succeeded by: Rudolf Jordan

Police President of Altona-Wandsbek
- In office 29 March 1933 – 31 March 1937

Police President of Wuppertal
- In office 29 August 1938 – 1 December 1943

Personal details
- Born: 25 June 1892 Berlin, German Empire
- Died: 13 April 1945 (aged 52) Nißmitz, Province of Saxony
- Cause of death: Suicide
- Party: Nazi party
- Occupation: Teacher; Police official

Military service
- Allegiance: German Empire
- Branch/service: Imperial German Army
- Years of service: 1914–1919
- Rank: Leutnant
- Battles/wars: World War I

Paul Georg Otto Hinkler (25 June 1892 – 13 April 1945) was a prominent member of the Nazi Party (NSDAP). He served as Gauleiter of Gau Halle-Merseburg and was a high-ranking police official for most of the Nazi regime.

== Early life ==
Hinkler spent his youth in Thorn, where he attended elementary and grammar school and completed teacher’s training. He began his career as a teacher in February 1914 but, when the First World War was declared in August, he volunteered for service in Foot Artillery Regiment 11. He saw action first on the Eastern Front, and from August 1918 on the Western Front. He suffered a nervous breakdown while fighting near Soissons in September 1918 and was sent to Thorn hospital. Discharged from army service with a partial disability as a Leutnant of the reserve in March 1919, he returned to teaching in Zippow near Schneidemühl, now Piła in Poland. In the same year he joined the Freikorps and became a district leader in Posen-West Prussia. In 1920 he became a member of the Marburg student corps in Gotha and Ohrdruf. In 1921 he passed his secondary teacher examinations. In August 1921 he moved to Freyburg.

== Nazi Party career ==
On 1 July 1922, he joined the Nazi Party and in May 1923, the Sturmabteilung (SA). Between 1922 and 1924 Hinkler was the Freyburg leader of the Stahlhelm, a veterans’ paramilitary organization. During the legal ban on the NSDAP, Hinkler worked as a district leader of Wehrwolf, a nationalist and anti-republican paramilitary military association. He was also a district commander in the Frontbann, a front organization for the also banned SA. After the re-establishment of the NSDAP, he rejoined the party and the SA on 27 May 1925 (membership number 5,492). He became the leader of the SA (Sturmführer) of Freyburg in June 1925. Because of his political and SA activities, Hinkler was temporarily suspended from his teaching position on 1 May 1925. On 11 August 1926, he was permanently dismissed from his position due to the commission of a violent offense.

In the NSDAP, Hinkler successively held positions as Ortsgruppenleiter (Local Leader), Bezirksleiter (District Leader) and Untergauleiter (Assistant Gauleiter) in Gau Halle-Merseburg. In July 1926 he was named Gau SA-Führer in Halle-Merseburg, and held this position through 1928. On 25 July 1926, he was appointed Gauleiter of Halle-Merseburg as the successor to Walter Ernst, who had been its first Gauleiter. Between 1927 and 1931 he was also a City Councilor in Halle.

In the election to the Prussian Landtag in May 1928, Hinkler was defeated but he was elected to the Provincial Landtag of the Prussian Province of Saxony and became the leader of its NSDAP parliamentary group. On 5 May 1930, Hinkler became a member of the National Socialist Motor Corps with membership number 13. On 10 October 1930, he was elected a member of the Prussian Landtag and he was named Executive Director of the Nazi parliamentary faction, holding this position until February 1933. In May 1932 he also became chairman of the budget committee.

Named as a national speaker (Reichsredner) for the Party, he was then granted a leave of absence from his Gauleiter position, and was succeeded by Rudolf Jordan on 19 January 1931. In 1932 Hinkler became a member of the Advisory Board of the Prussian State Bank. He also became the editor of the daily newspaper Der Kampf.

== Nazi Police career ==
After the seizure of power by the Nazis, Hinkler was appointed Police President of Altona-Wandsbek on 29 March 1933, heading the joint police force for the two independent cities. In that capacity he was also the head of the Secret State Police (Gestapo) there. From 29 July 1933, he headed the Gestapo for the entire Schleswig region of the Province of Schleswig-Holstein. In this position, Hinkler was responsible for the persecution of Jews, Social Democrats, Communists and all other persons and groups who were considered enemies of the new regime. On 11 August 1933, he requested that one of his predecessors, the Social Democrat Otto Eggerstedt, police chief of Altona and Wandsbek from 1929 to 1932, be sent to Esterwegen concentration camp and be closely guarded. Eggerstedt was transferred, subjected to harsh treatment, and on 12 October 1933 was "shot while trying to escape".

On 15 November 1933, Hinkler was briefly appointed head of the Gestapo in Berlin by Hermann Göring as the temporary successor to Rudolf Diels. However, he was forced out of that position after two weeks when rumors spread of alcohol dependence and mental weakness. Hinkler remained Police President of Altona-Wandsbek and head of the Gestapo there until 31 March 1937, when he lost his position as a result of the territorial reorganization mandated by the Greater Hamburg Act.

Hinkler had unsuccessfully applied to stand for election to the Reichstag on 29 March 1936. However, on 20 July 1936, Hinkler replaced sitting Reichstag Deputy Cuno Meyer, who was removed from office for financial irregularities. Hinkler represented electoral constituency 8 (Liegnitz) in Lower Silesia but in the 10 April 1938 election, he was elected for constituency 34 (Hamburg).

On 29 August 1938, Hinkler became the acting Police President of Wuppertal and on 8 March 1939 his appointment was made permanent. In 1940 he was temporarily drafted into the Wehrmacht. In his SA career Hinkler was promoted several times, ultimately on 9 November 1942 to SA-Gruppenführer. After conflicts with the local Düsseldorf Gauleiter Friedrich Karl Florian, Hinkler was placed on indefinite leave, effective 1 December 1943. He was placed at the disposal of the staff of the SA high command to 1945.

Toward the end of the war, as Allied soldiers closed in on him, Hinkler committed suicide by taking poison on 13 April 1945 in Nißmitz near Freyburg.

== Sources ==
- Höffkes, Karl (1986). Hitlers Politische Generale. Die Gauleiter des Dritten Reiches: ein biographisches Nachschlagewerk. Tübingen: Grabert-Verlag. ISBN 3-87847-163-7.
- Miller, Michael D.; Schulz, Andreas (2012). Gauleiter: The Regional Leaders of the Nazi Party and Their Deputies, 1925-1945. Vol. I (Herbert Albrecht - H. Wilhelm Hüttmann). R. James Bender Publishing. ISBN 978-1-932970-21-0.
