= Anhalt Landtag elections in the Weimar Republic =

German state elections

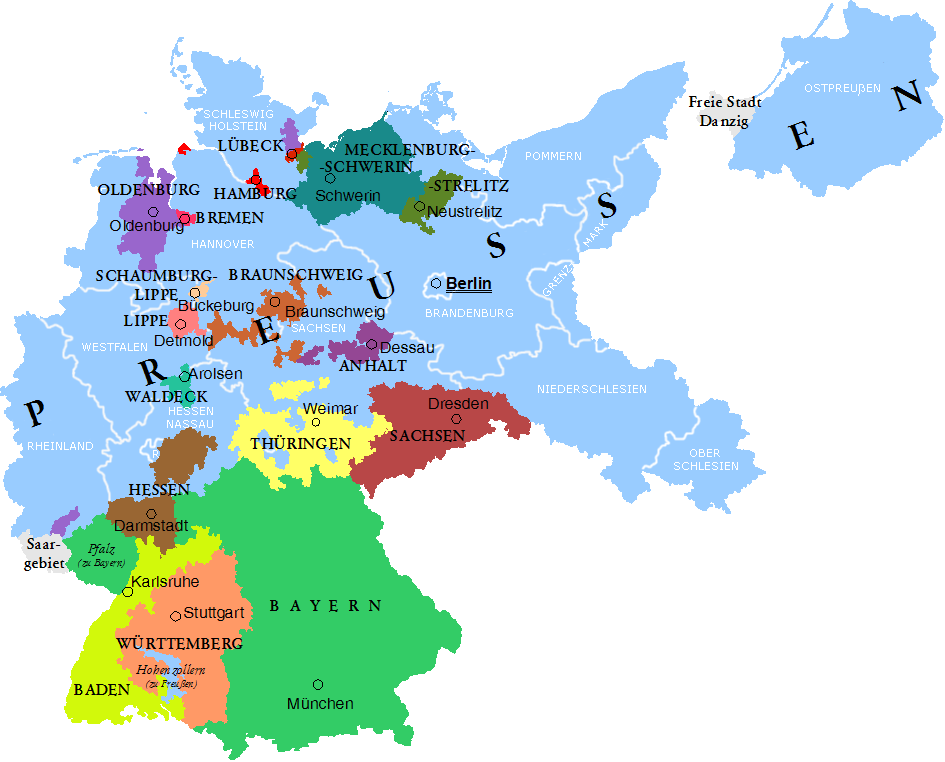
States of the Weimar Republic – Anhalt in purple in the center

Landtag elections in the Free State of Anhalt (Freistaat Anhalt) during the Weimar Republic were held at irregular intervals between 1918 and 1932. Results with regard to the total vote, the percentage of the vote won and the number of seats allocated to each party are presented in the tables below. On 31 March 1933, the sitting Landtag was dissolved by the Nazi-controlled central government and reconstituted to reflect the distribution of seats in the national Reichstag. The Landtag subsequently was formally abolished as a result of the "Law on the Reconstruction of the Reich" of 30 January 1934 which replaced the German federal system with a unitary state.

== 1918 ==
The 1918 Anhalt state election was held on 15 December 1918 to elect the 36 members of the Constituent National Assembly.

1918 Anhalt constituent election
Party	Votes	%	Seats
Social Democratic Party of Germany	93,170	58.03	22
German Democratic Party	54,668	34.05	12
German National People's Party & Landbund	9,525	5.93	2
German Middle Class Party	3,204	2.00	0
Total	160,567	100.00	36
Valid votes	160,567	99.86	
Invalid/blank votes	223	0.14	
Total votes	160,790	100.00	
Registered voters/turnout	198,388	81.05	
Source: Elections in the Weimar Republic, Elections in Germany

== 1920 ==
The 1920 Anhalt state election was held on 6 June 1920 to elect the 36 members of the Landtag.

1920 Anhalt Landtag election
Party	Votes	%	Seats	+/–
Social Democratic Party of Germany	61,671	35.77	13	–9
Independent Social Democratic Party of Germany	31,540	18.30	6	New
German National People's Party and Landbund	29,051	16.85	6	+4
German Democratic Party	27,013	15.67	6	–6
German People's Party	23,115	13.41	5	New
Total	172,390	100.00	36	0
Valid votes	172,390	99.87		
Invalid/blank votes	223	0.13		
Total votes	172,613	100.00		
Registered voters/turnout	198,388	87.01		
Source: Elections in the Weimar Republic, Elections in Germany

== 1924 ==
The first 1924 Anhalt state election was held on 22 June 1924 to elect the 36 members of the Landtag.

1924 Anhalt Landtag election
Party	Votes	%	Seats	+/–
Social Democratic Party of Germany	64,943	37.03	13	0
German People's Party	28,029	15.98	6	+1
German National People's Party	21,400	12.20	4	New
Communist Party of Germany	16,714	9.53	4	New
Agricultural League	14,681	8.37	3	New
Völkisch-sozialer Freiheitsblock (DVFP)	7,189	4.10	2	New
German Democratic Party	6,188	3.53	1	–5
Homeowners and Business	5,917	3.37	1	New
Homeowners (Town and Country)	3,601	2.05	1	New
Land Reform	3,005	1.71	1	New
Centre Party	2,009	1.15	0	New
German Farmers Federation	892	0.51	0	New
German Social Party	802	0.46	0	New
Total	175,370	100.00	36	0
Valid votes	175,370	99.27		
Invalid/blank votes	1,296	0.73		
Total votes	176,666	100.00		
Registered voters/turnout	223,501	79.04		
Source: Elections in the Weimar Republic, Elections in Germany

The second 1924 Anhalt state election was held on 9 November 1924 to elect the 36 members of the Landtag. Anhalt was the only state in the Weimar Republic to hold two Landtag elections in the same calendar year.

Second 1924 Anhalt Landtag election
Party	Votes	%	Seats	+/–
Social Democratic Party of Germany	78,675	40.95	15	+2
People's Community (DVP–DNVP–RLB–HuG–HB–DB)	74,638	38.85	14	New
German Democratic Party	14,009	7.29	3	+2
Communist Party of Germany	11,232	5.85	2	–2
Nationale Freiheitspartei (DVFP)	7,958	4.14	1	–1
Tenant Protection and Land Reform	3,210	1.67	1	New
Centre Party	2,408	1.25	0	0
Total	192,130	100.00	36	0
Valid votes	192,130	99.49		
Invalid/blank votes	977	0.51		
Total votes	193,107	100.00		
Registered voters/turnout	224,212	86.13		
Source: Elections in the Weimar Republic, Elections in Germany

== 1928 ==
The 1928 Anhalt state election was held on 20 May 1928 to elect the 36 members of the Landtag.

1928 Anhalt Landtag election
Party	Votes	%	Seats	+/–
Social Democratic Party of Germany	84,507	42.45	15	0
German People's Party	30,867	15.51	6	New
Landbundliste (Agricultural League)	21,721	10.91	4	New
Communist Party of Germany	14,957	7.51	3	+1
German National People's Party	13,317	6.69	2	New
German Democratic Party	8,444	4.24	2	–1
Anhalt House and Property	8,269	4.15	2	New
Reich Party of the German Middle Class	6,779	3.41	1	New
Nazi Party	4,117	2.07	1	0
Centre Party	2,288	1.15	0	0
Reich Party for Civil Rights and Deflation	1,932	0.97	0	New
Tenant & Lease Protection and Land Reform	1,073	0.54	0	–1
Left Communists	781	0.39	0	New
Total	199,052	100.00	36	0
Valid votes	199,052	97.64		
Invalid/blank votes	4,811	2.36		
Total votes	203,863	100.00		
Registered voters/turnout	231,361	88.11		
Source: Elections in the Weimar Republic, Elections in Germany

== 1932 ==
The 1932 Anhalt state election was held on 24 April 1932 to elect the 36 members of the Landtag.

1932 Anhalt Landtag election
Party	Votes	%	Seats	+/–
Nazi Party	89,652	40.88	15	+14
Social Democratic Party of Germany	75,137	34.27	12	–3
Communist Party of Germany	20,424	9.31	3	0
German National People's Party	12,835	5.85	2	0
German People's Party	8,198	3.74	2	–4
Anhalt House and Property	6,371	2.91	1	–1
German State Party	3,226	1.47	1	New
Centre Party	2,630	1.20	0	0
Socialist Workers' Party of Germany	806	0.37	0	New
Total	219,279	100.00	36	0
Valid votes	219,279	99.49		
Invalid/blank votes	1,119	0.51		
Total votes	220,398	100.00		
Registered voters/turnout	245,221	89.88		
Source: Elections in the Weimar Republic, Elections in Germany
