= Magdeburg (electoral district, 1919–1938) =

Former constituency of the Reichstag (Weimar Republic)

10 Magdeburg
- Former electoral constituency for the Reichstag
- Location within the Weimar Republic
- State: Prussia & Free State of Anhalt
- Province: Saxony
- Electorate: 975,106 (1919); 1,158,227 (1933)
- Major settlements: Magdeburg, Burg, Aschersleben, Halberstadt, Quedlinburg, Stendal

Former constituency
- Created: 1919
- Abolished: 1938

Magdeburg was one of the 35 electoral districts (German: Wahlkreise) used to elect members to the Reichstag during the Weimar Republic. It sent members to the Reichstag in nine democratic elections between 1919 and 1933. It existed nominally in the show elections to the Nazi Reichstag until 1938.

It comprised the Regierungsbezirk Magdeburg from Prussian province of Saxony as well as the state of Free State of Anhalt. It was constituency 10 in the numbering scheme.

== Electoral system ==
The constituency was created for the January 1919 election. Under the proportional representation electoral system of the Weimar Republic, voters cast a vote for party lists. Parties were awarded a seat for every 60,000 votes in a constituency. Excess votes were aggregated at two higher levels of seat distribution: an intermediate level combining multiple constituencies, where extra seats were awarded to parties' constituency lists, and a national level where seats were awarded to national lists of each party or alliance.

== Results (1919–1933) ==
=== Vote share ===
Party	1919	1920	1924 I	1924 II	1928	1930	1932 I	1932 II	1933
KPD		1.1	10.1	5.2	7.2	10.0	11.0	13.3	10.5
USPD	3.0	19.2				0.1			
SPD	58.3	33.6	32.0	39.2	43.0	37.2	32.3	31.0	27.6
DDP	25.4	13.7	6.9	6.9	4.9	3.4	1.1	0.8	0.6
Centre	1.5	1.6	1.8	1.9	1.7	1.7	2.0	1.9	1.8
DVP	3.2	14.3	14.4	15.5	14.1	7.4	1.2	2.1	1.2
WP			3.4	3.4	4.9	4.6	0.3	0.2	
DNVP	8.6	16.4	23.7	23.3	16.2	7.5	7.5	10.6	10.6
Nazi			4.9	3.0	1.7	19.5	43.8	39.0	47.3
Other		0.2	2.8	1.5	6.3	8.5	0.7	1.2	0.3
Turnout	86.6	84.5	84.7	85.7	84.5	88.3	88.8	85.7	91.7
Source: Wahlen in Deutschland

=== Deputies ===
Election	Distribution	Seats
1919		11
1920		13
May 1924		11
Dec 1924		13
1928		13
1930		14
Jul 1932		15
Nov 1932		15
1933		17
Source: Wahlen in Deutschland
