= Free State of Anhalt =

German state (1918–1945)

Free State of Anhalt Freistaat Anhalt (German)
- State of Germany
- 1918–1945
- Flag Coat of arms

- The Free State of Anhalt (red) within the Weimar Republic

Anthem
- Anhalt Lied "Song of Anhalt"
- Capital: Dessau
- Area
  - Coordinates: 51°50′N 12°15′E
  - 1925: 2,314 km^{2} (893 sq mi)
- Population
  - 1925: 351,045
- Government
  - Type: Republic
- Reichsstatthalter
  - 1933–1935: Wilhelm Loeper
  - 1935–1937: Fritz Sauckel
  - 1937–1945: Rudolf Jordan
- Minister-President
  - 1918–1919: Wolfgang Heine
  - 1919–1924: Heinrich Deist
  - 1924–1924: Willy Knorr
  - 1924–1932: Heinrich Deist
  - 1932–1940: Alfred Freyberg
  - 1940–1945: Rudolf Jordan
- Legislature: Landtag of Anhalt
- Historical era: Interwar / World War II
  - Established: 12 November 1918
  - Disestablished: 23 July 1945
Preceded by	Succeeded by
Duchy of Anhalt	Saxony-Anhalt (1945–1952)

The Free State of Anhalt (German: Freistaat Anhalt) was a state of the Weimar Republic from 1919 to 1933 and of Nazi Germany from 1933 to 1945. It is today part of the German state of Saxony-Anhalt.

The Duchy of Anhalt became the Free State of Anhalt during the German revolution of 1918–1919. The ruling House of Ascania abdicated peacefully, and a constitutional assembly was elected which drew up a republican constitution for Anhalt as a member state of the Weimar Republic. Throughout most of the Republic's fourteen-year life, the Social Democratic Party was the dominant political force in Anhalt, and it saw relatively little of the violence that flared up in other parts of Weimar-era Germany. Anhalt was nevertheless the first Weimar state to elect a local parliament with a Nazi majority (May 1932).

Anhalt became part of the Nazi Gau Magdeburg-Anhalt in 1933. Late in World War II, Dessau, Anhalt's capital city, was almost completely destroyed by Allied bombing, as was the smaller city of Zerbst. The region was ceded to Russian occupation forces on 1 July 1945, and three weeks later the Free State of Anhalt formally ceased to exist when it was merged into the Soviet-administered state of Saxony-Anhalt. It was dissolved in 1952 but re-created in 1990 after the reunification of Germany.

== Historical background ==
=== German Empire ===
The Duchy of Anhalt was formed in 1863 when the Duchy of Anhalt-Bernburg united with the Duchy of Anhalt-Dessau under Duke Leopold IV of Dessau. The Duchy, a member of the German Confederation, fought on the Prussian side in the 1866 Austro-Prussian War and became part of the Prussian-dominated North German Confederation in 1866 and of the German Empire in 1871.

Under the Constitution of the German Empire, the Duchy of Anhalt elected two members to the Reichstag under universal manhood suffrage and appointed one member to the Bundesrat. Anhalt had a local parliament, the Landtag, in Dessau. Its members were elected on the basis of census tax provisions which excluded poorer citizens or reduced the weight of their votes. In spite of the franchise inequality, relations between workers and the middle and upper classes were relatively good compared to other parts of the Empire. During the reign of Duke Friedrich II (1904–1918), the House of Ascania kept a relatively low profile, did not maintain a lavish court and was not involved in day-to day-politics, all qualities which helped its standing among Anhalt's working class.

=== World War I ===
As was the case before 1914, the labor situation in Anhalt during the war was quieter than in Germany as a whole. At the national level, the radical anti-war faction of the Social Democratic Party (SPD) split off to form the Independent Social Democrats (USPD) in April 1917 and went on to lead the massive strike of January 1918, but in Anhalt there was still only one very small local chapter of the USPD when the German revolution broke out in November 1918. The SPD was also able to engage successfully in local politics. It sent representatives to the Landtag for the first time in 1902, and in February 1918 it backed the liberal Fritz Hesse in his successful campaign for mayor of Dessau against the conservative Ernst von Ebeling.

Duke Friedrich avoided making chauvinistic statements or patriotic calls to persevere in the face of the adversity of the war years. He was known instead for the work he and the ducal family did to try to relieve the problems caused by food shortages. Friedrich died childless in April 1918 and was succeeded by his brother Eduard, who died on 13 September. Since Eduard's son Joachim Ernst was still a minor, his uncle Aribert became prince regent.

=== German revolution ===
On 6 November, when the German revolution of 1918–1919 had already swept over much of Germany, Anhalt's National Liberal and SPD leaders asked Prince Regent Aribert to replace the conservative state minister Ernst von Laue with Max Gutknecht and to democratize local elections. Aribert installed Gutknecht on 3 November, and the State Ministry, formerly just one person, was expanded to seven.

Revolutionary soldiers from Magdeburg seized the Friedrich Barracks in Dessau on the night of 8–9 November and during the following day took the remainder of the troops in Dessau into custody. Following the pattern set as the revolution advanced across Germany, the soldiers formed a council, and a few hours later a workers' council was also established. The workers' and soldiers' councils then met in the city hall, presided over by Fritz Hesse, to whom Max Gutknecht and the military authorities had given authority to negotiate for them. They drafted a statement with fourteen demands, most of them focusing on ensuring peace and order. They called for patrols in Dessau and prescribed the death penalty for plundering. Mayor Hesse and the State Ministry both approved the statement. The result was a peaceful transfer of power to the revolutionary councils.

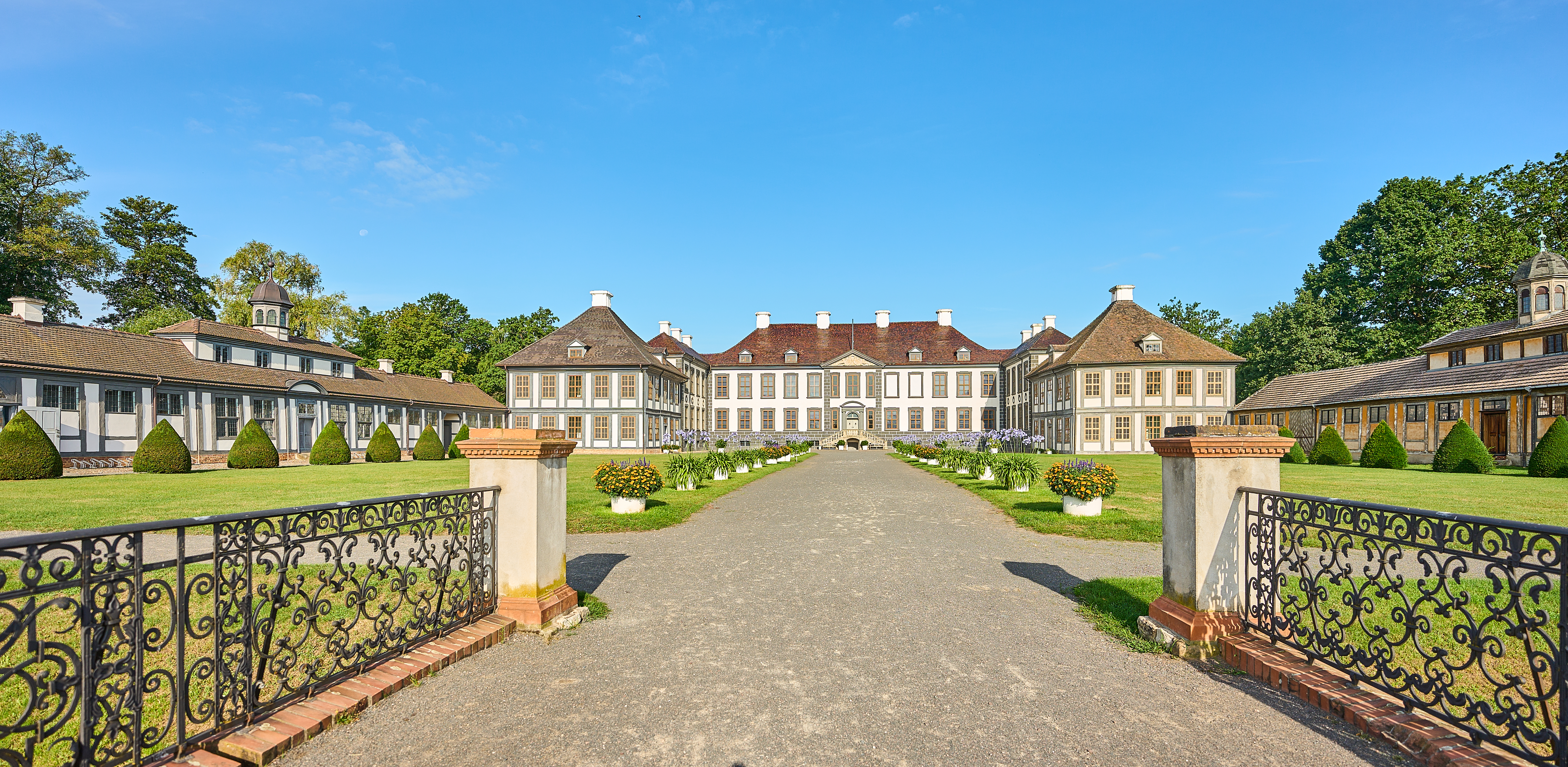
Oranienbaum Castle, a possession of the Ascanier dynasty, became Anhalt state property in 1926.

Prince Regent Aribert announced on 12 November that he was resigning his position as regent and renounced Joachim Ernst's and the ducal house's right of succession to the throne. The abdication was a result of the situation in the rest of Germany, where ruling houses in other states were already falling, rather than of anything that had occurred in Anhalt. There had been no public calls for an abdication, but neither had anyone fought for the retention of the House of Ascania. Following Aribert's announcement, the councils assured the safety of the family and its property. In 1926, the second of two settlement contracts between the Free State of Anhalt and the ducal house made state property of the castles at Wörlitz and Oranienbaum, along with cultural artefacts of significant value.

Four Social Democrats and three National Liberals under the leadership of Wolfgang Heine (SPD) formed a Council of State (Staatsrat) and took over the duties of the duke and Landtag on an interim basis with the promise that they would act with the agreement of the workers' and soldiers' councils. They set 15 December 1918 as the date for the election to the state constitutional assembly and followed the voting rights established at the national level on 30 November: all men and women at least 20 years old were allowed to vote. Since the Anhalt election was the first to be held under the new voting rights, it was in Anhalt that women in Germany first went to the polls on an equal footing with men. The SPD won 21 of the 36 seats, the center-left German Democratic Party (DDP) 12, the right-wing German National People's Party (DNVP) 2 and the USPD 1. Turnout was 81%.

== Weimar Republic ==
=== Government ===
Anhalt's constituent assembly, which met on 20 December 1918, was the first to be held among Germany's post-imperial states. Heinrich Pëus (SPD) was elected its president. The SPD, in spite of having an absolute majority in the assembly, chose to form a coalition with the DDP in order to have a broader basis for writing the constitution for the Free State of Anhalt. The draft they created was adopted by the assembly on 18 July 1919.

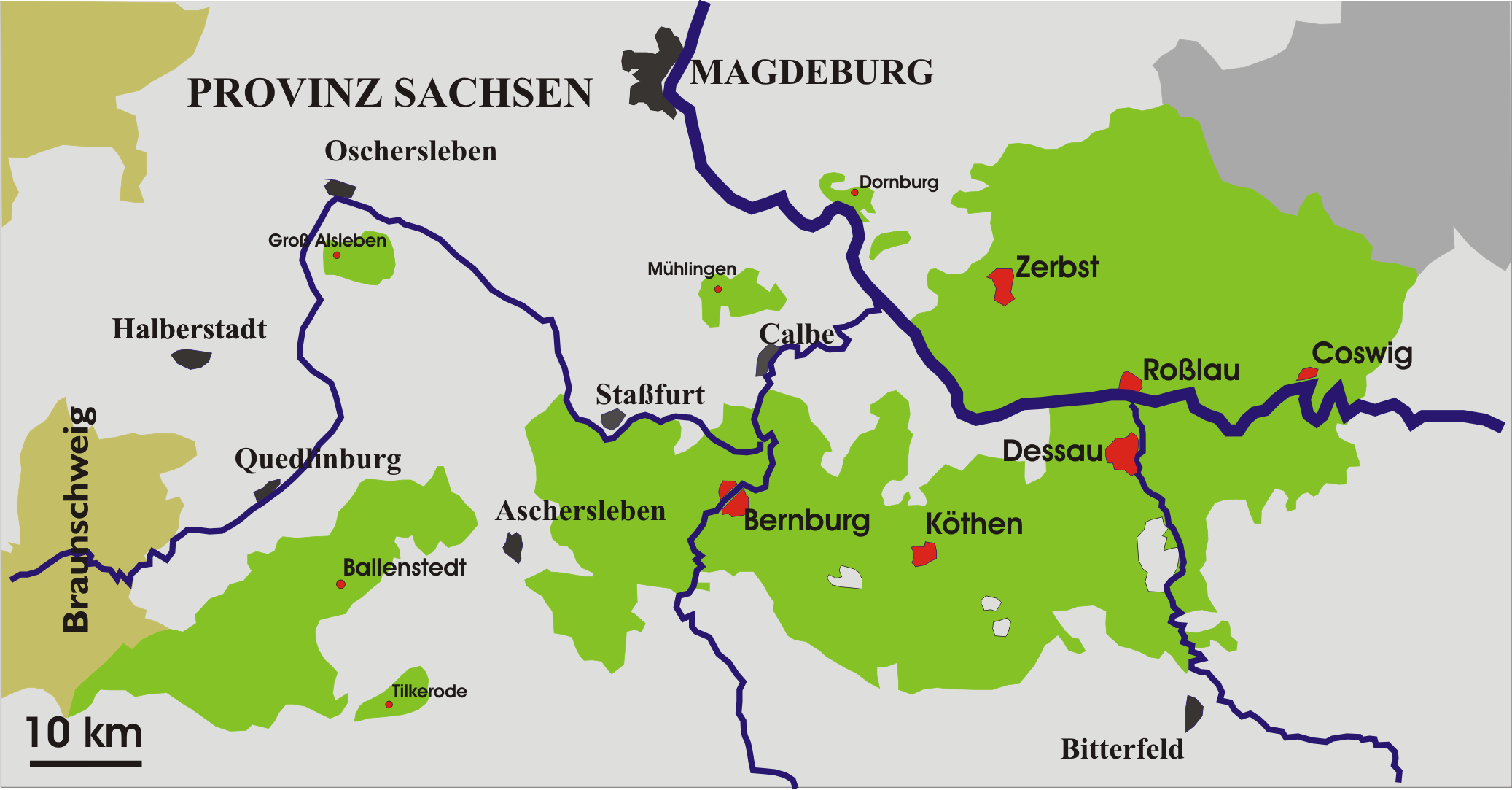
The Free State of Anhalt, showing its two larger regions which bordered on Saxony (dark gray) and Brunswick (tan). Its five exclaves were surrounded by the Prussian Province of Saxony (light gray).

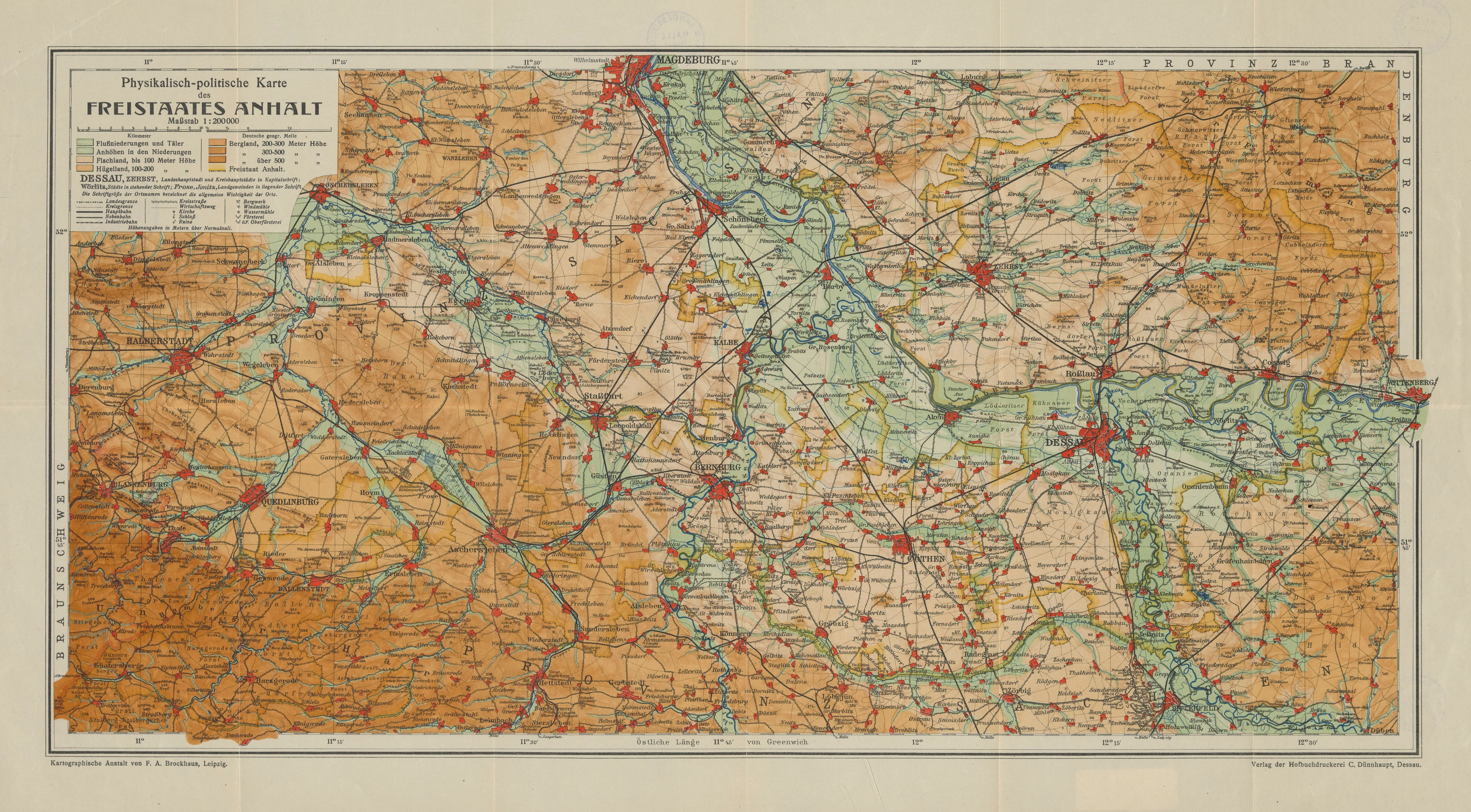
Physical-political map of the Free State of Anhalt, undated

The constitution established a unicameral legislature and a Council of State (State Ministry as of 1922) which was dependent on the confidence of the Landtag. Following are its key provisions:

- Elections were held using a general, equal, direct and secret ballot according to the principles of proportional representation. All men and women at least 20 years old were allowed to vote. The same rules applied to municipalities.
- The 36 members of the Landtag were initially elected for three years. The term was lengthened to four years in 1923.
- The Landtag passed laws, authorized the state's income and expenditures and supervised the policy and administration of the state.
- The Landtag and Council of State (State Ministry as of 1922) could both propose laws.
- The Council of State / State Ministry was to consist of five to seven members elected separately by the Landtag in secret ballots. They could not be Landtag members. Their terms coincided with that of the Landtag which elected them.
- The Council of State / State Ministry required the confidence of the Landtag and had to resign if the Landtag withdrew its confidence in a majority vote.
- Laws required the approval of both the Landtag and the Council of State / State Ministry. The Landtag could override a no vote by the Council of State / State Ministry with a two-thirds majority.
- The Landtag could change the constitution with a two-thirds majority vote.

Wolfgang Heine replaced Heinrich Deist of the SPD as head of the Council of State when the constitution came into effect. Except for a period of just under five months in 1924 when Willi Knorr of the DNVP was minister-president, Deist remained in the post until the 1932 election. Alfred Freyberg of the Nazi Party then took over as minister-president of Anhalt.

At the national level, Anhalt had 1 member in the Reichsrat who was appointed by the state government to represent Anhalt's interests in the legislation and administration of the nation at the federal level.

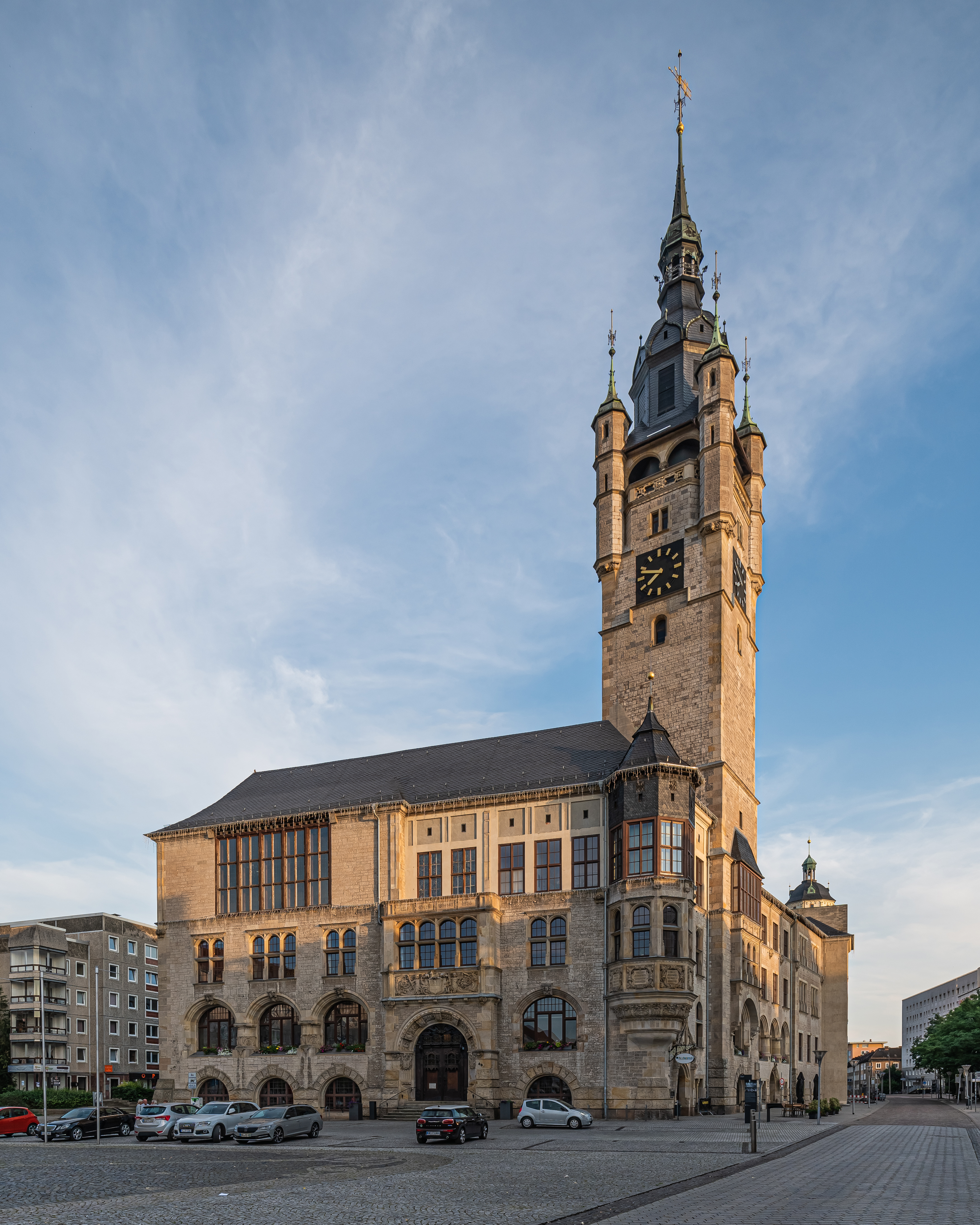
City Hall in Dessau

Anhalt held six elections to the Landtag, the first on 6 June 1920 and the final on 5 March 1933. Only one did not occur at the end of a scheduled term. On 9 July 1924, the Landtag that had been elected on 22 June 1924 dissolved itself due to difficulties in forming a stable coalition. A new election was held on 9 November, after which Willi Knorr's short-lived government ended and Deist again became minister-president. Over the life of the Weimar Republic, the parties of the Left gradually lost power while those on the Right gained. Following the Landtag election of May 1932 in which the Nazi Party won 15 of 36 seats, it formed a coalition with the DNVP, and Anhalt became the first German state with a Nazi-led government. In the opinion of Anhalt historian Ralf Regener:

As paradoxical as it may initially seem, it can be said that the phase of continuity and stability in Anhalt during the Weimar Republic favored the premature and comprehensive seizure of power by the National Socialists, since ... the radicalization potential of regional society was simply not taken seriously enough [when viewed] from a position thought to be secure.

=== Economy and religion ===
Anhalt's workforce was 55% hourly workers, 16% salaried employees and civil servants, 14% independent workers, 11% family members who helped out in the family business and 4% domestic workers. 48% of the workforce was employed in industry and the skilled trades, 18% in agriculture, 14% in trade and transportation, 5% in government administration and 15% in other areas.

91.4% of the population of Anhalt was Protestant, 4% Catholic, 0.3% Jewish and 4.3% other religions or none.

=== Major events ===
Even though Anhalt was quiet compared to other parts of Germany during the January 1919 Spartacist uprising in Berlin, the Council of State on 11 January called for the creation of a citizen's militia for the protection of the residents of Anhalt. On 23 February a regional miners' congress announced a general strike in central Germany. It spread to Anhalt and included workers from industry, transportation, power plants and agriculture. Three-quarters of all workers in Saxony, Thuringia and Anhalt walked out. The strikers' main demands were the socialization of large companies and the right of co-determination. The strike ended on 8 March after the government in Berlin promised an expansion of co-determination and the formation of industrial works councils. During the 1920 Kapp Putsch, armed conflicts broke out in Dessau, where on 16 March five people who were taking part in a protest against a newspaper that had supported the putschists were killed. The final revolutionary action in Anhalt occurred on 21 August 1920 in Köthen when communists took over the city hall, police building, post office and train station. Authorities who were called in from Dessau quickly regained control.

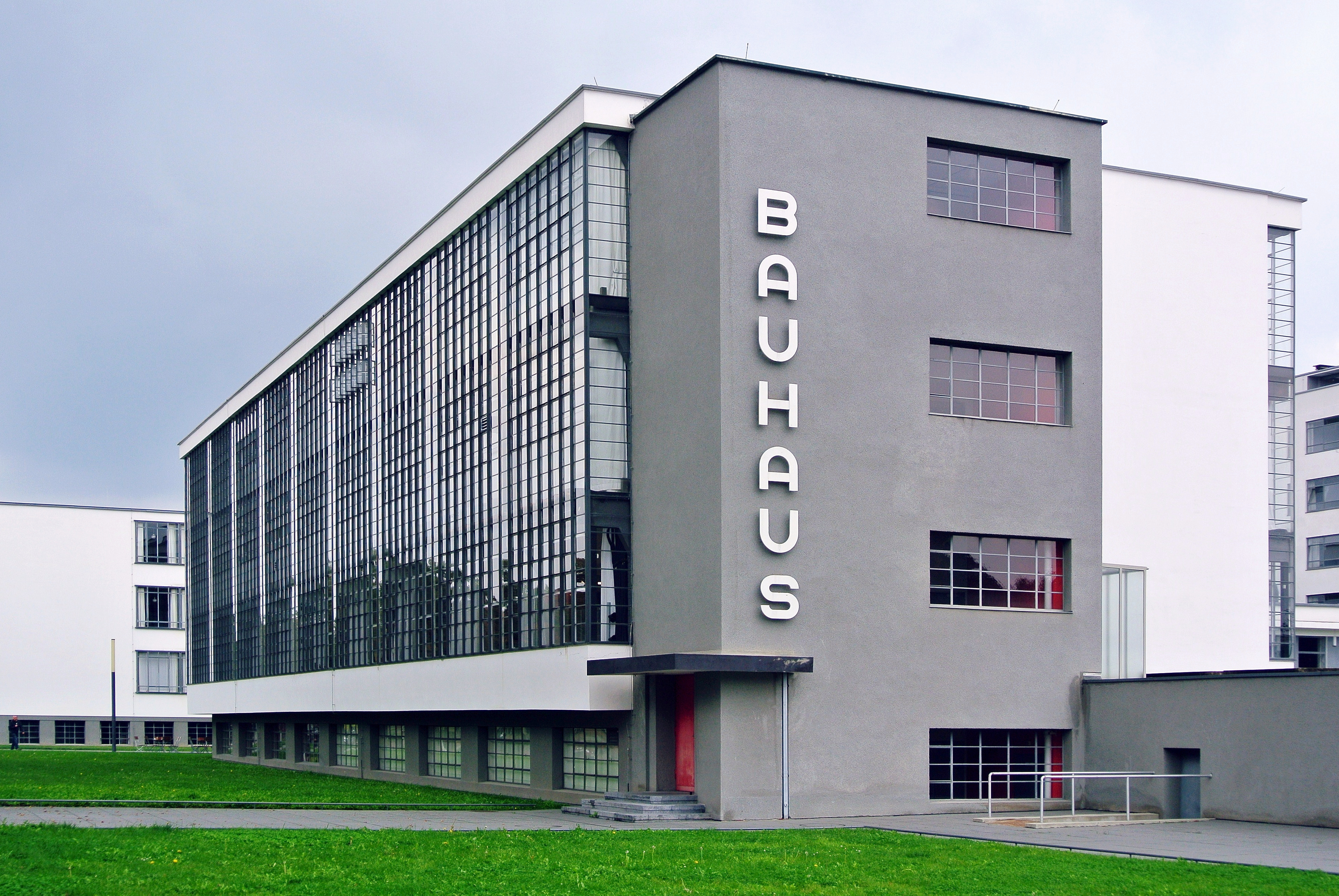
The Bauhaus building in Dessau, designed by Walter Gropius

Dessau grew into a modern industrial city following the 1919 founding and subsequent expansion of Junkers Aircraft. It was forcibly taken over by the Reich Ministry of Aviation shortly after the Nazis came to power in 1933.

On 1 April 1925 the famous Bauhaus art and architectural school moved to Dessau from Weimar, but it relocated to Berlin in 1932 after the Nazis took over the government in Anhalt.

== Nazi Germany and World War II ==
After the Nazis came to power at the national level in 1933, mass arrests of members of the KPD in Anhalt began on 6 March, with SPD members following somewhat later. The Gleichschaltung Law of 31 March 1933 dissolved Anhalt's elected Landtag and replaced it with one based on the Reichstag election of 5 March 1933. A follow-up law on 7 April installed Wilhelm Loeper as Reichsstatthalter for Brunswick and Anhalt, with his office in Dessau. Anhalt, along with all other German states, had its Landtag abolished and its state sovereignty transferred to the Reich government by the "Law on the Reconstruction of the Reich" of 30 January 1934. Although Anhalt itself was not formally abolished, it was superseded in administrative importance by the Nazi Gau Magdeburg-Anhalt.

Dessau was bombed repeatedly during World War II, leaving the city 85% destroyed. Zerbst, to the northwest of Dessau, was 80% destroyed on 16 April 1945, just weeks before Germany surrendered.

In the spring of 1945, near the end of World War II, American and British troops occupied Anhalt. The area was handed over to Russia 1 July 1945, and on 23 July, after Germany had been divided into zones of occupation, Anhalt was merged with the bulk of the Prussian Province of Saxony to form the Soviet-administered German state of Saxony-Anhalt. It was dissolved in 1952 but re-created in 1990 after the reunification of Germany.

== See also ==
- List of minister-presidents of Anhalt
- Anhalt Landtag elections in the Weimar Republic
