= Gau Magdeburg-Anhalt =

Administrative division of Nazi Germany from 1933 to 1945

- Gau of Nazi Germany
- 1926–1945
- Flag Coat of arms

- Capital: Dessau
- Government
- Gauleiter
  - 1926–1927: Gustav Hermann Schmischke
  - 1927–1935: Wilhelm Friedrich Loeper
  - 1935–1937: Joachim Albrecht Eggeling (acting)
  - 1937–1945: Rudolf Jordan
- History
  - Establishment: 1 September 1926
  - Disestablishment: 8 May 1945
Preceded by	Succeeded by
Free State of Anhalt; Province of Saxony	Saxony-Anhalt (1945-1952)
- Today part of: Germany

The Gau Magdeburg-Anhalt was an administrative division of Nazi Germany from 1933 to 1945. Formed in 1926 as Gau Anhalt-North Saxony Province by the merger of three smaller Gaue (Anhalt, Elbe-Havel and Magdeburg) it comprised the German state of Anhalt and part of the Prussian province of Saxony. It was renamed Gau Magdeburg-Anhalt on 1 October 1928. From 1926 to 1933, it was the regional subdivision of the Nazi Party in that area.

== History ==
The Nazi Gau (plural Gaue) system was originally established in a party conference on 22 May 1926, in order to improve administration of the party structure. From 1933 onwards, after the Nazi seizure of power, the Gaue increasingly replaced the German states as administrative subdivisions in Germany.

At the head of each Gau stood a Gauleiter, a position which became increasingly more powerful, especially after the outbreak of the Second World War, with little interference from above. Local Gauleiters often held government positions as well as party ones and were in charge of, among other things, propaganda and surveillance and, from September 1944 onward, the Volkssturm and the defense of the Gau.

The position of Gauleiter was held from 1926 to 1927 by Gustav Hermann Schmischke who had headed Gau Anhalt since 1925. He was succeeded by Wilhelm Friedrich Loeper from 1927 to 1935 until his death from cancer, followed by his deputy Joachim Albrecht Eggeling, who administered the Gau from 1935 to 1937. Rudolf Jordan was the Gauleiter for the remainder of its history from 1937 to 1945. Jordan was sentenced to 25 years prison in the Soviet Union after the war but released in 1955 and died in 1988. He published his autobiography about his time as Gauleiter and in captivity which showed no indication that he was willing to take responsibility for the events in Nazi Germany.
