= Carbide Factory, Bydgoszcz =

Company, defunct, Bydgoszcz, Poland, 20th century

Coordinates: 53°11′31″N 17°58′00″E

Karbid Wielkopolski
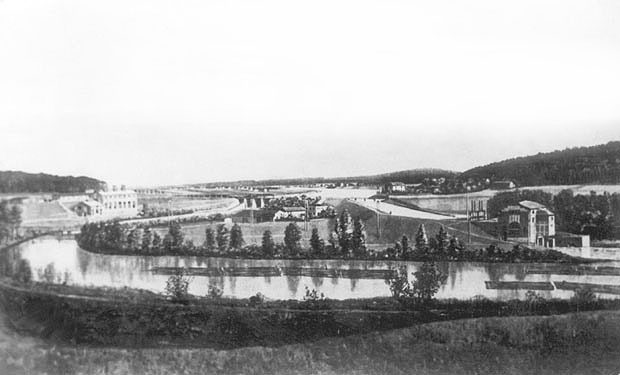
- View in 1905 of the factory complex on the Brda river
- Company type: State-owned enterprise
- Industry: Carbide
- Founded: February 1906 in Bromberg, German Empire
- Defunct: April 11, 1949, Poland
- Fate: Bankrupted
- Headquarters: Smukała, Bydgoszcz, Poland
- Products: Carbide

The Karbid Wielkopolski or Greater Poland Carbide Factory is a defunct firm (1906–1949) which was established in the northern district of Smukała in Bydgoszcz, Poland. It produced carbide: the facility, where a Nazi transit camp was set up during WWII, is survived today by a dam feeding a hydroelectric power plant on the Brda river.

== History ==
=== Initial Prussian facility ===
At the beginning of the 20th century, the growing demand of the German economy for calcium acetylide or calcium carbide could not be met by the insufficient domestic production. The shortage had to be covered by imports. Abroad, competitors in this industry, especially in the Scandinavian countries, proved to have much lower fabrication costs, thanks mainly for the energy coming from hydropower plants that supplied their carbide plants.

Facing these considerations, the German company Brandenburgisches Carbidwerk GmbH, established in 1902, started to look in the eastern territory of Prussia for a suitable location where new investments in this sector could be realized in order to increase national production. The result of its survey concluded that the best location was the village of Mühlthal (Polish: Smukała) -today a district of Bydgoszcz. Indeed, the Brda river waters at this spot provided a constant flow through the year, in particular with the absence of freezing. Furthermore, the plot was close enough to the Prussian Eastern Railway network, with which the connection was made possible by an existing narrow-gauge railway.

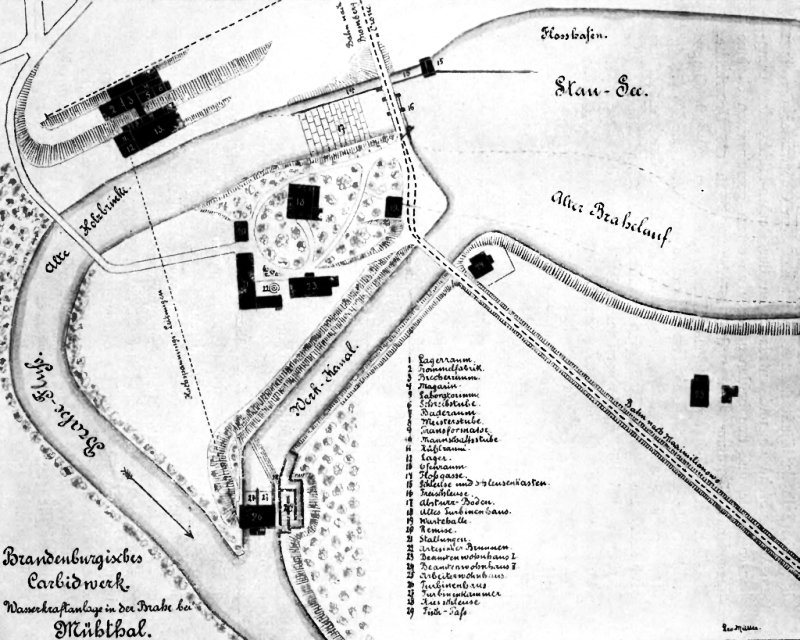
Map of the complex in 1905

Works started in 1904, and lasted less than two years. In February 1906, the hydroelectric power plant on the river with its extensions was operative. The complex comprised:

- a 30 hectares (74 acres) water reservoir;
- a weir;
- a dam;
- a water channel to the power house;
- a turbine hall;
- the carbide factory itself, powered by the electricity of the turbine.

In addition, the premises housed residential buildings for workers and administrative staff.

Among the three plants owned by the Prussian company, Smukała facility in 1917/1918 was more profitable than the one at Steinbusch and almost as profitable as the third one at Borkendorf. To boost its activity, the Brandenburgisches Carbidwerk GmbH did not limit the use of carbide for lighting and welding, but also opened it to the production of potassium fertilizer for the agriculture.

=== The Polish factory ===
In 1920, with the re-creation of the Polish state, German trade and industry were "polonized", so was carbide factory in Smukała. The joint-stock company "Karbid Wielkopolski" was established on the site of the liquidated "Brandenburgisches Carbidwerk GmbH" and took over the production on July 1, 1921. The seat of the new firm was at 76 Gdańska street in Bydgoszcz, in a tenement house belonging to Stanisław Rolbieski.

Its Supervisory board consisted initially of nine Polish citizens:

- Melchior Wierzbicki (1867-1925), a lawyer, national and social activist, also member of other supervisory boards, e.g. Bank Stadthagen, Lloyd Bydgoski;
- Tadeusz Chmielarski (1876-1945) a lawyer, vice-president of Bydgoszcz, member of the supervisory board of Lloyd Bydgoski, president of the "Bydgoszcz "Fowler Brotherhood" (Polish: Bydgoskie Bractwo Kurkowe) on Toruńska Street;
- Karol Bauer, the director of the Bank Stadthagen;
- Konrad Fiedler (1886-1939) a journalist, traveler, national and social activist, editor-in-chief of "Dziennik Bydgoski" and city counselor;
- Leon Figiel, the director of two firms, "Wisła", a wood factory and "Promień", producing matches;
- Father Jan Filipiak (1881-1946), a priest, administrator of the Church of the Holy Trinity in Bydgoszcz, parish priest in Panigródz, dean of Inowrocław, honorary canon of Gniezno;
- Marian Maryński (1883-1938), a doctor, surgeon, social activist, member of the supervisory board of "FEMA", a metal products factory at 11 Doktora Emila Warmińskiego street;
- Józef Milchert (1874-1930), a merchant, national and social activist, owner of a vodka and liqueur factory, inventor of 25 patents, founder of the "Bydgoszcz Merchants' Association";
- Maksymilian Sentkowski (1875-1942), a merchant, vice president of the Chamber of Commerce and Industry in Bydgoszcz, president of the Bydgoszcz Merchants' Association, city counselor, president and member of supervisory boards of several banks and companies, co-founder of the "Promień" match factory;

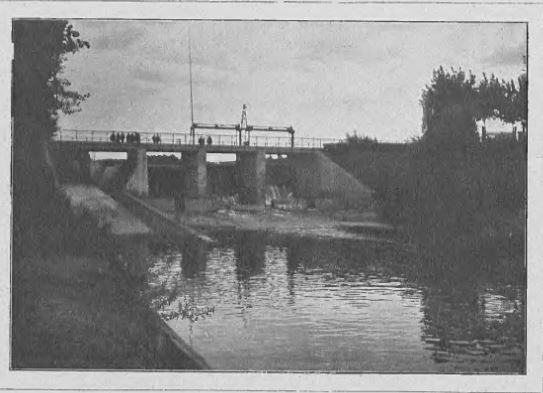
The dam in 1923

The following year the council was added three additional seats:

- one for Bydgoszcz president, Bernard Śliwiński in 1922, as a vice-chairman;
- Father Tadeusz Malczewski (1873-1929), a Catholic priest, dean of Bydgoszcz, pastor of the cathedral, clerical counselor, member of the Poznań Society of Sciences;
- Stanisław Niesiołowski (1880-1927), a national activist and first Starosta of the Bydgoszcz County.

Throughout the company's existence, the Management Board was manned only by engineer Stanisław Rolbieski.

The priorities in the early 1920s for the "Karbid Wielkopolski" was to raise the quality standard of the plant and renovate employees' apartments. The company maintained trade relations with almost the entire country, selling even products to the foreign market. Its production was mainly dedicated to the mining industry.

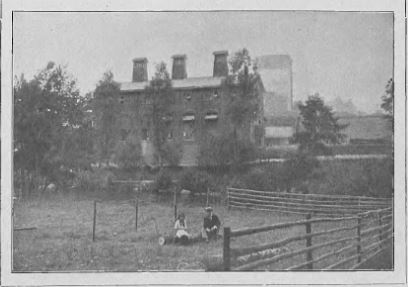
View of the Carbide Factory building in 1923

In 1922, the factory was added a department for the production of drums, necessary for the transport of carbide. Furthermore, the purchase of a new turbine allowed to increase the current output of the power plant from 2,400 to 3,000 horsepower (2,200 kW), leading to raise the production of carbide by 25% in 1923–1924. During the same period, the firm purchased the farms located around the dam along the Brda river banks.

At its heyday, "Karbid Wielkopolski" properties consisted of:

- facilities in Smukała
  - an electrical center and electricity switching station,
  - the factory manager's villa with a farmhouse adjoined;
  - an office and residential houses;
  - a farm house, a stable with a cowshed, a barn and a pigsty;
  - a coach house and a warehouse in the ancient turbine hall.
- facilities in Opławiec (opposite river side)
  - a factory complex including inter alia a furnace hall and a forge;
  - a can factory and a granary;
  - a carbide depot, warehouses, workshops (carpentry, tinsmith);
  - a workers' housing estate with 19 buildings.

The largest area (472.95 square metres (0.11687 acres)) was devoted to the forge and the warehouses. The site had even a fire brigade composed of 16 people.

In the 1930s, the 1929 world crisis harshly impacted the company's activity: the number of employees was divided by 4 between 1934 (200) and 1939 (55), even though its production peaked in 1938 (2065 tons).

=== Start of WWII ===
The beginning of World War II brought a halt to the activity of "Karbid Wielkopolski". In early September 1939, the retreating Polish Army blew up the power plant building and the bridge.

During the occupation, the facility moved under the "German Central Trust Office-East" (German: Haupttreuhandstelle Ost), dealing with the issues related to the disposition of property in the Polish annexed lands. From October 1939, the carbide factory was subordinated to a receivership at the orders of the Trust Office of the Danzig-Westpreußen district.

The German authorities made attempts to re-launch the production, identified as critical for the military, but never succeeded. Hence, in March 1940, layoffs began. A vast majority of the equipment was dismantled and sold to German companies. The houses (i.e. manager's villa and accommodations) were arranged as offices.

=== Nazi transit camp ===
Nazi authorities had decided to establish labor camps in August 1941, stating that all persons displaced from Pomerania and not eligible for Germanisation were to remain in these camps permanently. To that end, the factory premises were leased to the "Umwandererzentralstelle (UWZ) Danzig-Westpreußen" (English: Central office for Emigrants in Gdańsk-West Prussia), coordinating the expulsion of Poles, Ukrainians and Jews. The "UWZ Danzig-Westpreußen", having liquidated the resettlement camp in Tczew in March 1941, decided that the former Smukała's plant would take over this function. Following an agreement (in August 1941) between the head of the Security Police and the factory administrator, the camp started operating on September 1, 1941. It used part of the area: the administration building, a shed, the storage facilities and a workers building.

The policy of Germanisation of Pomerania dictated that this camp (similarly to those in Potulice and Toruń) was directed towards the rural population of Polish origin living in the newly created Reichsgau Danzig-West Prussia (i.e. the north-western part of Poland). The places emptied by the displaced Poles were aimed to receive German settlers from Eastern Europe.

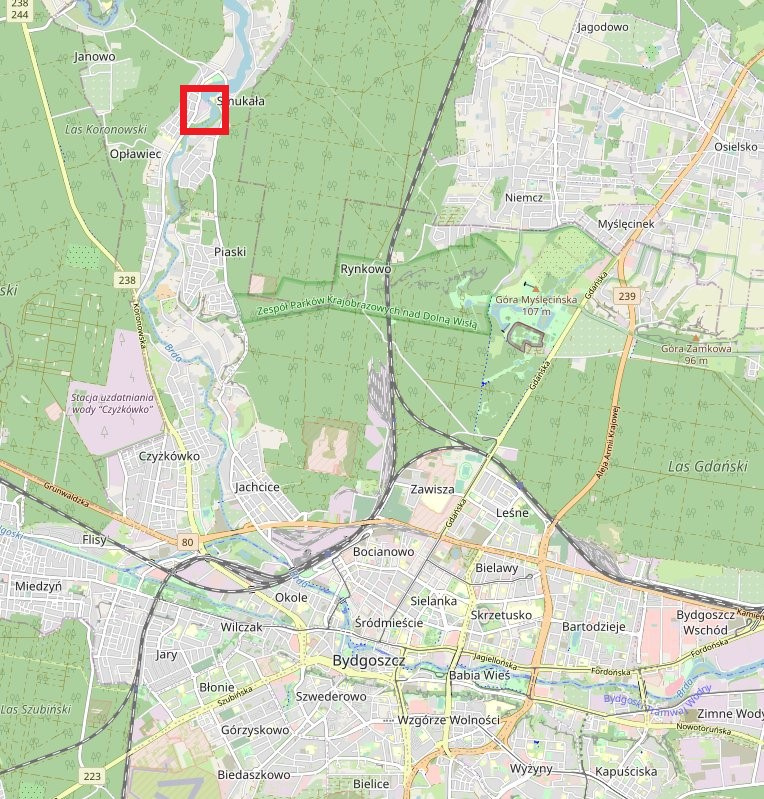
Smukala site in the vicinity of Bydgoszcz

After arriving at the camp, the prisoners were selected: those capable of working, aged 14 to 60, were taken to forced labor, the sick, the elderly and women with children were detained in the camp. The prisoners lived in three unheated factory warehouses, in a brick shed and in a barn together with the cattle. They slept on a concrete floor. Babies were given a cup of skim milk once a week. Extremely hard work was a daily task: in particular, prisoners took over the rebuilding of the water dam destroyed by retreating Poles. With the camp located on both sides of the Brda River, the exhausted prisoners had to travel about a kilometer in order to get to the canteen.

From September 1, 1942, the Smukała's camp was subordinated to the Potulice's facility. In February 1943, the establishment was closed and the prisoners transferred to Potulice.

On May 3, 1943, an area of the ex-factory not used by the closed camp was sold to "Energieversorgung Westpreußens" (English: Power supply of West Prussia), with the project to rebuild the hydroelectric power plant: this plan was never implemented.

=== Post War liquidation ===
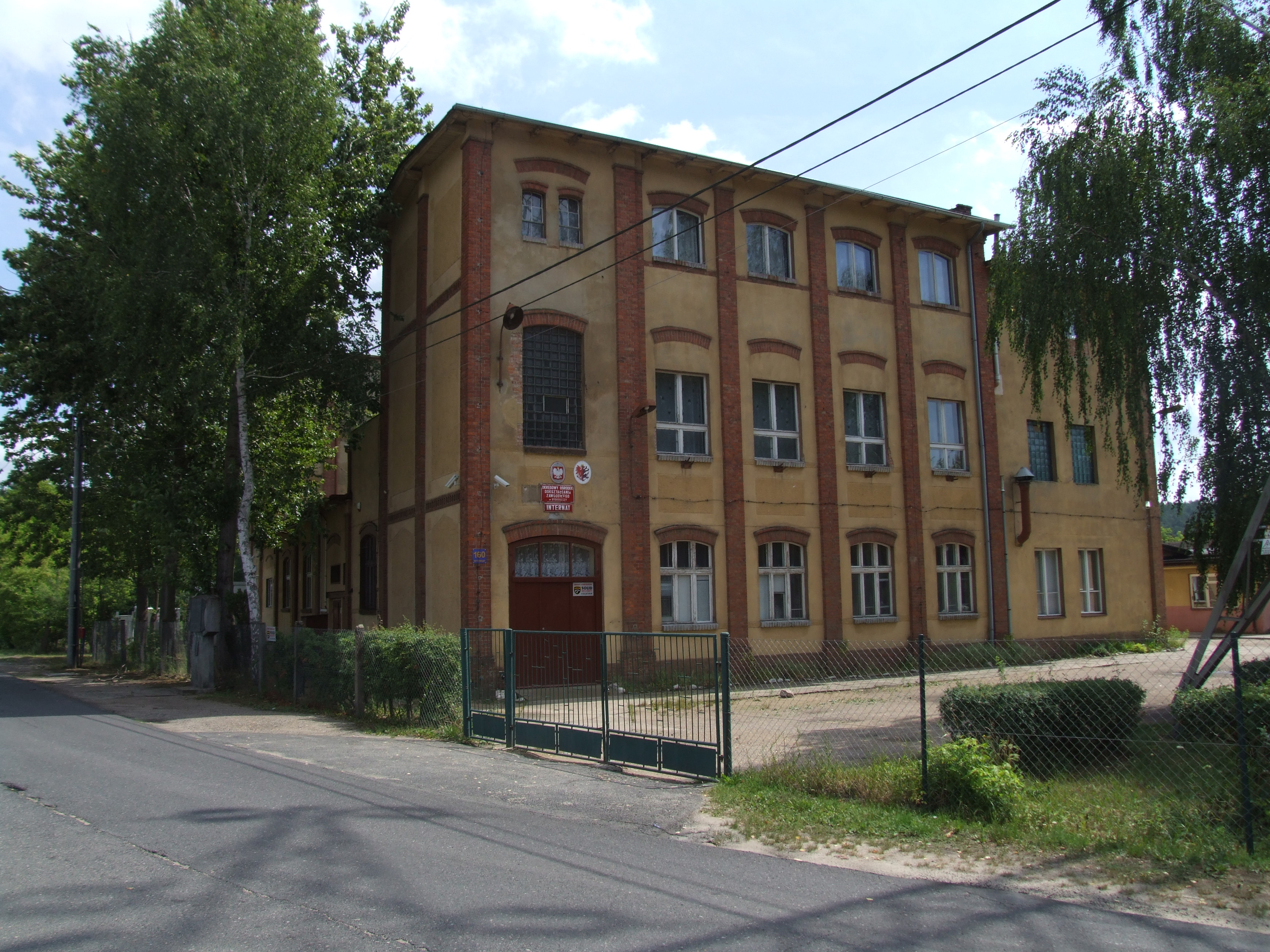
Ex-carbide factory building. It housed the prisoners of the camp in 1941–1943. Today it is a boarding school

Already before WWII, most of the plots belonging to "Karbid Wielkopolski" in Smukała and Opławiec which did not include factory buildings (e.g.g workers' housing estate, farms, meadows), had been allotted and sold out. After a meeting held in the Bydgoszcz City Hall on November 27, 1946, no steps were taken to rebuild the war damage of the reactivated company. In fact, most of the efforts were focused on recovering and selling the assets of the "Karbid Wielkopolski".

The machines and tools confiscated by the Germans had diverse fates:

- some were found in local industrial plants, like the "Bydgoszcz Machine Factory H. Lohnert" at 17 Dworcowa Street or the "Grakona Fabryka" at 13 Obrońców Bydgoszczy Street;
- some electrodes and transformers were found in Bavaria, triggering a successful recovery action. These devices were then sold and transported to the "Zakłady Elektrochemiczne" (English: Electrochemical Plants) in Ząbkowice Śląskie;
- attempts to recover the machines that had been moved to Hungary were met with failure.

The company was liquidated under the resolution of the General Meeting of Shareholders on April 11, 1949.

The "Zakłady Energetyczne Okręgu Północnego w Bydgoszczy" (English: Northern District Power Plant in Bydgoszcz) took over the factory buildings, warehouses and offices. It upgraded the hydroelectric power plant in 1951 by installing two new 2 megawatts (2,700 hp) German turbines.

The former carbide factory building and the power switching station were transferred in 1947 to the District Power Plant to be transformed into a gymnasium. After renovation works, the school opened in 1956: the school building occupied the ex-switchboard rooms and the ancient carbide factory house was used as a boarding house.

== The site in the 21st century ==
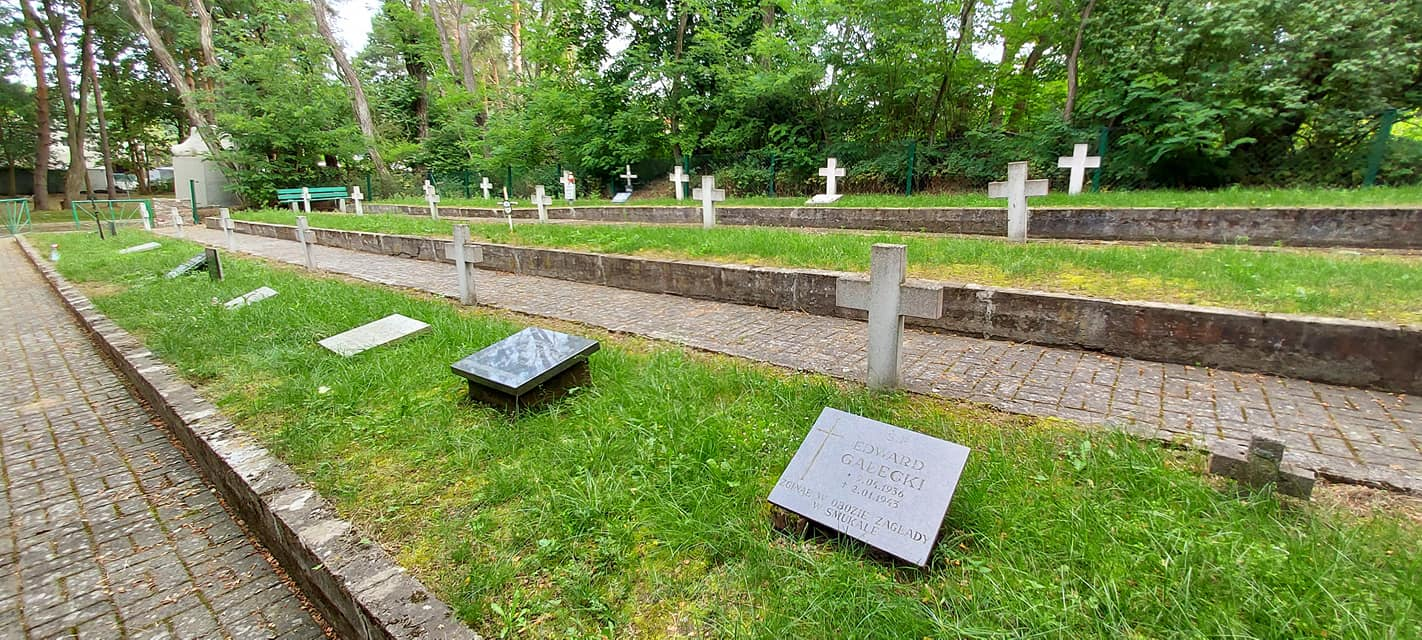
Cemetery in Smukała

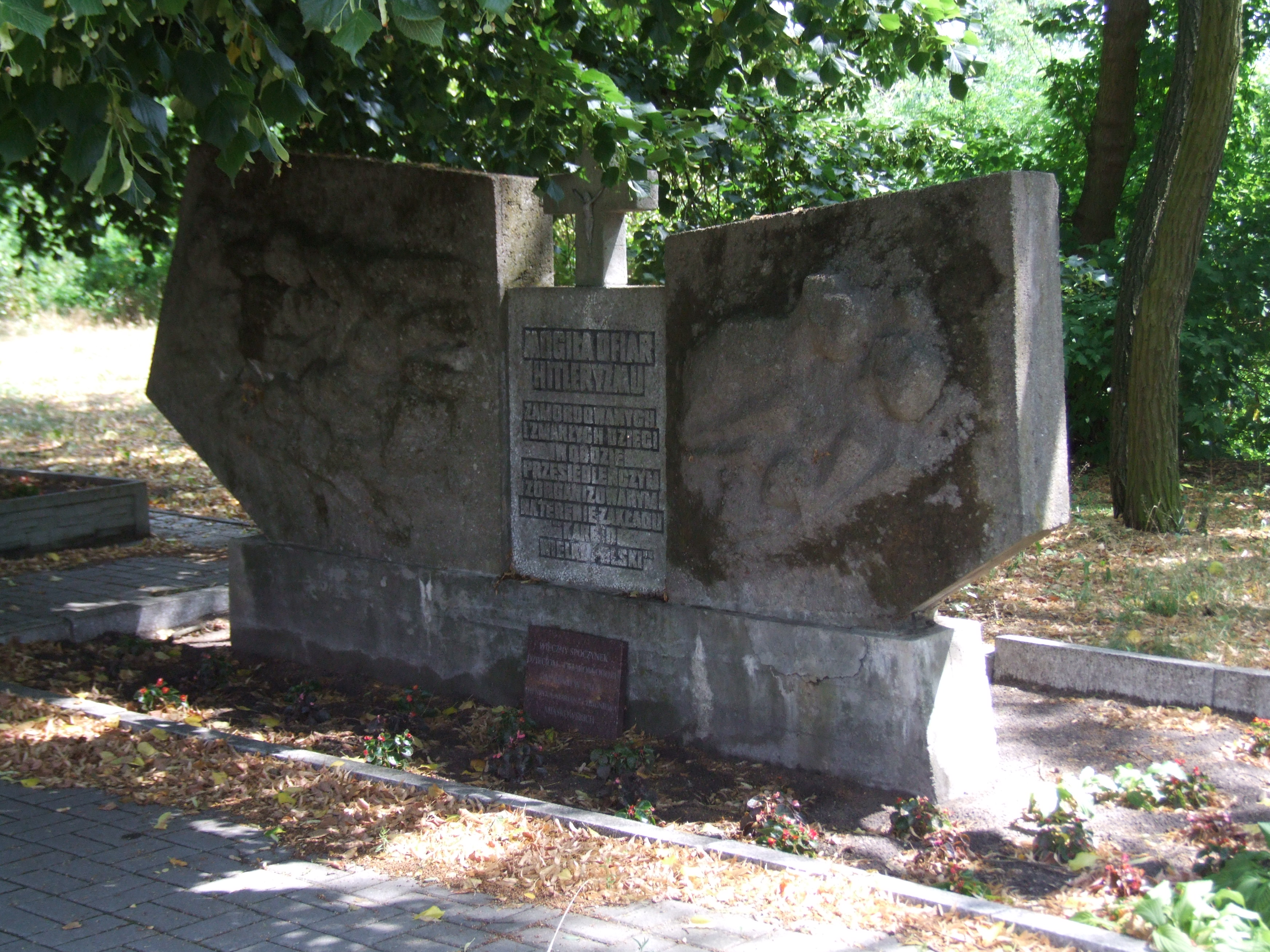
Commemorative monument and plaque along the Brda, on the ancient site of camp along the Brda river

=== Hydroelectric complex ===
The current complex includes:

- an earth dam;
- a weir damming the water of the Brda river up to a height of 8 metres (26 ft);
- an outlet;
- a fish pass;
- the hydroelectric power plant, providing up to 8MW with two Kaplan turbines.

The associated water reservoir is 110 metres (360 ft) wide, covering up to 96 hectares (240 acres). Under normal conditions, the power plant generates a flow of 15 to 45 m^{3}/s.

It is the largest hydropower plant in Bydgoszcz city. The facility is managed by the company "Elektrownie Wodne" based in nearby Samociążek.

=== Cemeteries and commemoration ===
As a result of the exhausting and murderous work, the starvation and beatings, 814 people, including 420 children, died in the camp.

They rest in two cemeteries, at Baranowskiego street and at 160 Opławiec, buried in common graves by lack of room. A vast majority of the tombs are children, with about 140 children under the age of two. Only 265 victims were identified by name and surname.

Commemorative plaques can be found in the premises of today's boarding school, which used to hold the prisoners, but also in the cemeteries where the unfortunate are buried, on the monument along the Brda river or in the Smukała church "Transfiguration of the Lord".

== See also ==
- Bydgoszcz
- Stanisław Rolbieski
- Germanisation
- Carbide

== Bibliography ==
- (in Polish) Pene, Robert (2018). Karbid Wielkopolski w Smukale pod Bydgoszczą. Kronika Bydgoska T39. Bydgoszcz: Towarzystwo Miłosnikow Miasta Bydgoszczy - Bydgoskie Towarzystwo Naukowe. pp. 197–216.
