= Bydgoszcz Cable Factory =

Cable Production Factory, 1920, Bydgoszcz, Poland

Coordinates: 53°07′23″N 18°04′32″E

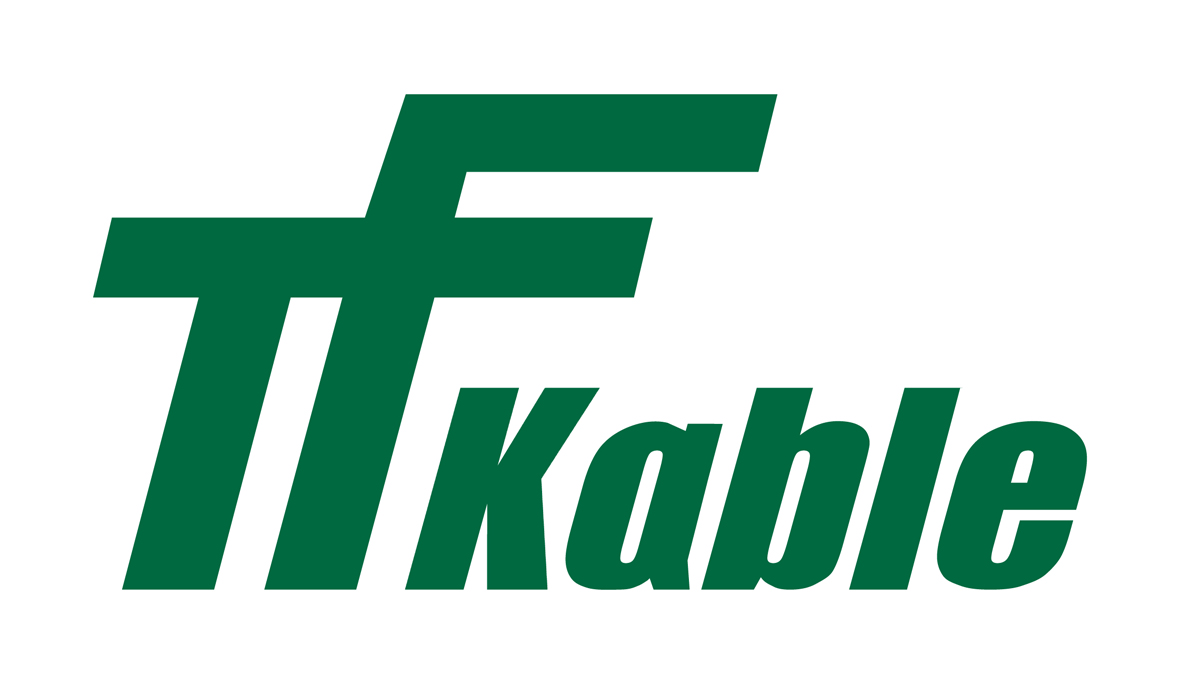
- Logo Tele-Fonika Kable

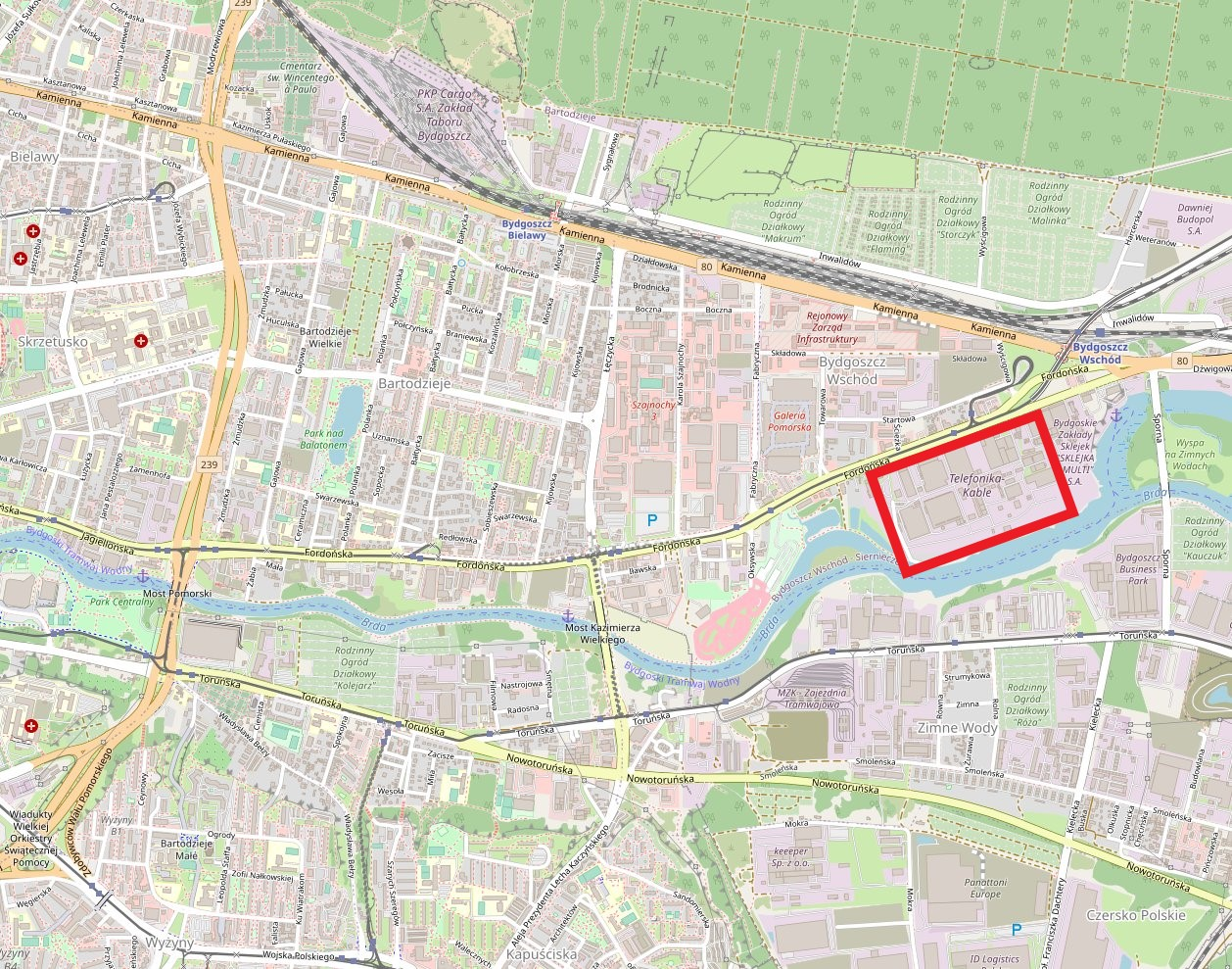
- Location in Bydgoszcz
- Native name: Bydgoska Fabryka Kabli
- Company type: Privately held company
- Industry: Cable industry
- Founded: 1920; 105 years ago in Bydgoszcz, Second Polish Republic
- Founder: Spółek Zarobkowych i Gospodarczych
- Headquarters: Myślenice, Poland
- Area served: Europe, US, Canada, and Russia
- Products: Power Cables
- Parent: Felten & Guilleaume, Fabrik elektrischer Kabel, Stahl und Kupferwerke
- Website: www.tfkable.com/en_pl/

Bydgoszcz Cable Factory (later known as Tele-Fonika Kable S.A.-Bydgoszcz branch) is a Polish company founded in 1920 that makes electrical cables that is based in the city of Bydgoszcz. It has been owned since 2003 by "Tele-Fonika Kable S.A." Corporate group, located in Myślenice. The plant is the oldest existing cable factory in Poland, producing up to 25,000 km of cables per year.

The Bydgoszcz plant is the leading facility of the Tele-Fonika Kable S.A. group. The latter is the largest producer of medium and high voltage power cables in Europe. By 2006, the station covered an area of 24 hectares (59 acres) and employed more than 600 workers. The plant's quality certificates are vouched in Poland and in many other countries: Germany, United Kingdom, United States, Finland, France, Canada and Russia.

Tele-Fonika Kable group is a member of the "International Cablemakers Federation-ICF". Cables produced by the Bydgoszcz Cable Factory have been laid, among others, at Heathrow Airport, in the Channel Tunnel, at the Wembley Stadium, in mines in Peru and Chile and at the Warsaw National Stadium. Tele-Fonika Kable group, Bydgoszcz Factory parent company, is the third electric cable manufacturer in Europe, at the head of 5 plants in Poland and 2 others abroad (Serbia, Ukraine).

== Name changes ==
- 1920–1939 – "Kabel Polski" Spółka Akcyjna (Joint-stock company);
- 1939–1942 – "Hermann Göring Werke, Treuhandstelle Ost" (Trust Office East);
- 1942–1945 – "Felten-Guilleaume A.G. Wien", Kabelwerk – Bromberg;
- 1945–1948 – "Kabel Polski Spółka Akcyjna pod Zarządem Państwowym" (Under State Control);
- 1948–1959 – "Pomorskie Zakłady Wytwórcze Materiałów Elektrotechnicznych" (Pomeranian Electrotechnical Materials Manufacturing Plant) "im. gen. Karol Świerczewski" (once nationalized);
- 1959–1993 – "Bydgoska Fabryka Kabli im. gen. K. Świerczewskiego". From 1970 to 1975, it was part of the Cable Industry Combine "Polkabel";
- 1993–1999 – "Bydgoska Fabryka Kabli S.A.";
- 1999–2003 – "Elektrim Kable Polskie S.A." – Bydgoszcz plant;
- Since 2003 – "Tele-Fonika Kable S.A." – Bydgoszcz plant.

== History ==
=== Interwar period ===
The plant establishment is linked to the development of electrical engineering in the Second Polish Republic. Before 1920, very few workshops in Poland were producing electric cables and electric machines. Indeed, during this period of Prussian occupation, the market was dominated by the German industry.

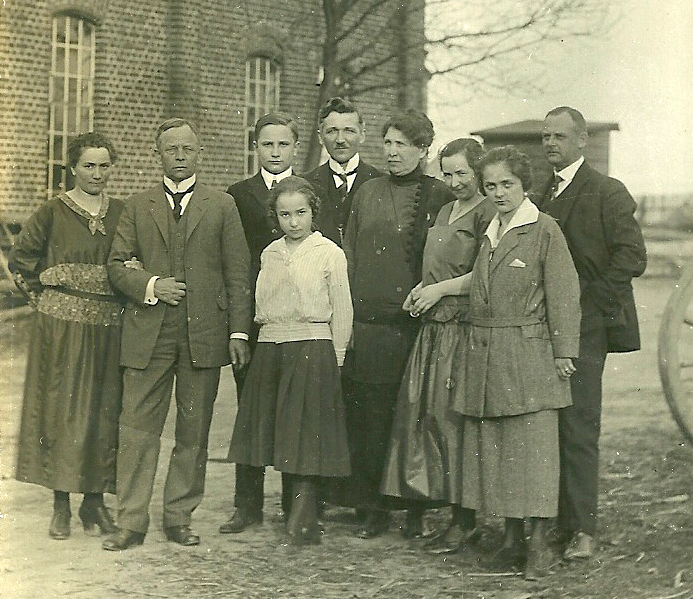
Stanisław Rolbieski, second from the left

In these conditions, the development of the Polish cable industry only took off in 1920: on the initiative of Polish capital investors, two factories were established simultaneously, in Warsaw and Bydgoszcz. During WWII, the Warsaw plant was entirely razed and never rebuilt. On October 12, 1920, on the initiative of the "Association of Commercial Companies" (Polish: "Spółek Zarobkowych i Gospodarczych") in Poznań, the "Kabel Polski joint-stock company" (Polish: Towarzystwo Akcyjne "Kabel Polski") was established with a share capital of Mp.20 million. It was not the first factory from this industry in Bydgoszcz, as Stefan Daszewski and Rafał Kukliński, Polish emigrants in the USA, had set up earlier the same year the joint US-Polish company, AMPOL, producing incandescent light bulbs at 4 Sienkiewicza Street.

The official ceremony of the cornerstone laying took place on November 11, 1920. From 1924, the company was co-owned by the "Association of Commercial Companies" in Poznań and the Warsaw firm "Siła i świat" (Strength and Light), one of the largest enterprises in Poland at that time. By the start of WWII, many other cable production sites opened in Poland: initially in Warsaw and Ruda Pabianicka, then in Kraków (1927), Będzin (1927), Czechowice-Dziedzice (1928) and Ożarów Mazowiecki (1931). In 1938, cable factories were set up in Central Industrial District (Dwikozy, Lubartów) but could not be completed due to the outbreak the armed conflict.

The initial governance board was composed of 10 people and included Jan Maciaszek, then Mayor of Bydgoszcz. The first technical director was Stanisław Rolbieski, former deputy director of the "Deutsche Kabelwerke A.G." in Berlin before WWI. The plot for the construction of the plant was purchased from the company "Żegluga Bydgoska" (Bydgoszcz Shipping), equipped with a branch line connecting it to the near "Bydgoszcz East" railway station. In 1921, municipal construction counselor Köppen approved the design of the factory.

The construction works lasted from November 1920 to May 1922, performed by a local Bydgoszcz construction company: initially, two production buildings and one administrative and auxiliary edifice were erected, all made of brick with wooden roofs. In 1922, Stanisław Rolbieski purchased second-hand machines in Weimar Republic, which took a long way back to Bydgoszcz via Finland and the Free City of Danzig, due to the German–Polish customs war then in place. The manufactory had its own boiler room and a 300 HP steam engine connected to a DC generator. In 1929, the ensemble was also powered from the municipal power plant.

The factory was officially opened on June 4, 1923, with the five departments (Rubber, Telephone, Machine press, Tin, Wire drawing) and covered an initial surface of 8.5 hectares (21 acres). On this very day, a formal reception was held in the Hotel "Pod Orlem" attended by 55 guests.

In 1923, for the first time in Poland the production of electrical cables started there. The raw materials were imported from abroad:

- basic copper from United States, Canada, Chile and Belgium;
- tin from Netherlands;
- natural silk from France;
- asbestos from United Kingdom;
- lead from Germany.

Purer copper ("electrolytic copper" obtained by electrolysis) was purchased from Polish mills in Silesia.

As earlier as 1925, "Kabel Polski" had been producing a large panel of cables and wires, even shipbuilding and submarine communications cables. Regular customers were, among others, "Polska Akcyjna Spółka Telefoniczna" in Warsaw, PKP, the Ministry of Post and Telegraphs and its branches directorates throughout Poland, the Railway Signals Factory and several power plants in Bydgoszcz, Ostrów Mazowiecka, Toruń or Poznań.

On February 22, 1927, a terrible fire almost completely burned down the facility: only the power plant, the boiler room and workshops survived. The extensive insurance policy contracted by "Kabel Polski" was able to cover the 1.5 million Złoty damages while enabling the funding of a modernization and a further expansion. The latter required purchasing new plots from "Żegluga Bydgoska", hence extending its area down to the Brda river. Within one year, a new hall designed by architect Bronisław Jankowski was added, comprising 2 gantry cranes and equipped with steam machines from the "F. Eberhardt company" located at "2 Berliner straße" (today's Swiętej Trojcy street). The facility then covered an area of 18 hectares (44 acres) and employed 400 people. "Kabel Polski" at that time was equipped with a copper wire draw bench and a chemical department, where natural rubber was transformed into a rubber tape for wire insulation. A separate unit dealt with insulation using fibrous materials such as paper, jute, cotton or silk. The plant had a testing laboratory checking and vouching the products.

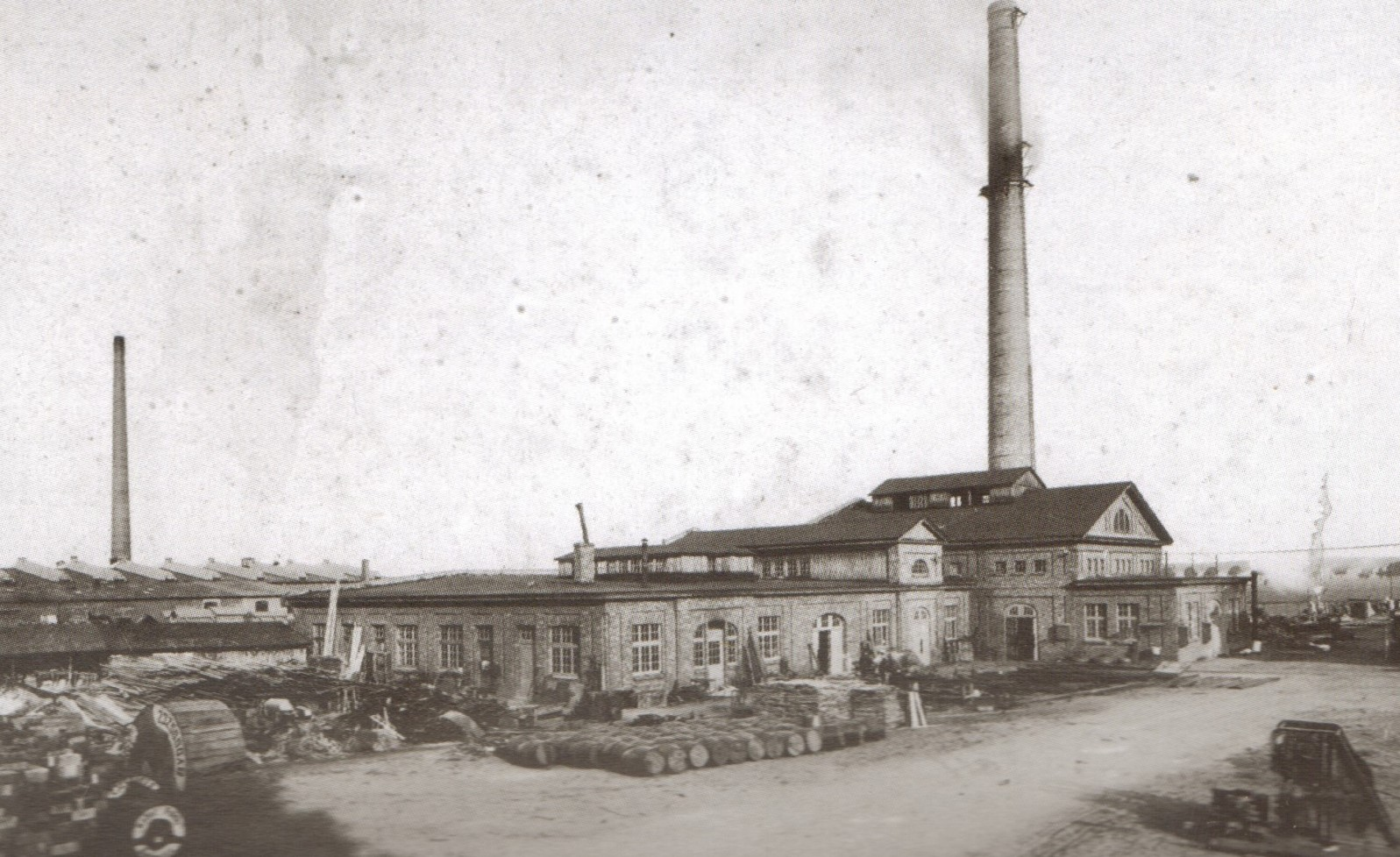
The factory compound in the early 1930s

In the 1930s, several new factory buildings were built, among others:

- a villa for the director and houses for specialists on the bank of the Brda river (1931);
- a high voltage test station (1931);
- a wire draw bench machine (1936);
- a jute welding plant (1936);
- a workshop for engineers.

The plant had also its own quay on the Brda river which was used on occasion to receive imported copper wire rods ferried from Warsaw via the Vistula.

On April 18, 1930, a Voluntary Fire Brigade unit was established in the premises. Over the following years, the Fire Brigade conducted training exercises, took part in firefighting operations and secured numerous incidents, including outside the factory in the local community.

To allow further development, an agreement was concluded in 1927, with the joint stock company "Felten-Guilleaume A.G." from Vienna, which entered the Kabel Polski capital (15%) in exchange for technical supervision and licences. Under the new deal conditions, Germans were engaged in technical managerial positions. In 1928, a licence from Siemens & Halske in Berlin was acquired, for the production of intercity cables, telephone and loading coil for telegraphy. At the beginning of the 1930s, the shared capital was again increased by 5 million Złotys, following agreements with companies "Felten-Guilleaume" in Vienna and Budapest, and the "František Křižík's Electrotechnical Workshop" in Prague. In 1935, a license agreement for the production and sale of load coil cables was signed with the "International Stanford Electric Corporation" in New York City. The products were regularly awarded with quality awards, such as the 1927 gold medal at the Water Exhibition in Bydgoszcz, the 1928 "Northern Fair" of Vilnius or the 1929 "Polish General Exhibition" of Poznań.

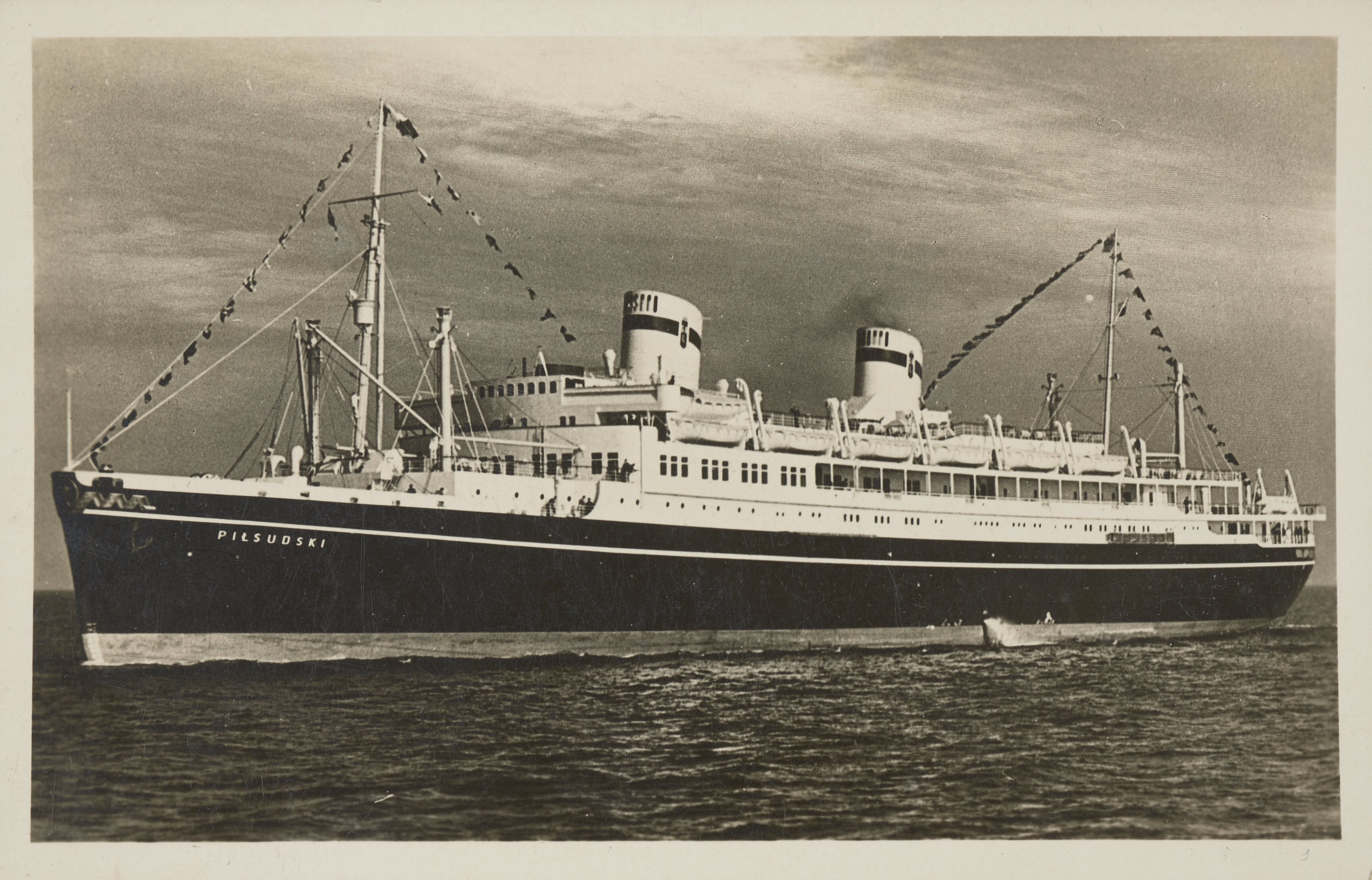
MS "Pilsudski", 1937–1939

In 1929, long-distance telephone cables for international communication started to be produced and in the 1930s, it was the turn of cables for shipbuilding of the Polish fleet. Furthermore, "Kabel Polski" provided equipment to Polish ships built in England, military units (destroyers ORP Wicher, ORP Burza) or civilian ones (passenger ships MS Batory, MS Piłsudski). In 1929, its production was valued at 10.5 million Złoty and it employed 500 people. Until 1931, "Kabel Polski" had selling branches all over Poland: Warsaw, Łódź, Katowice, Sosnowiec, Łuck, Gdańsk.

The Great Depression impacted the firm between 1930 and 1935: production and employment fell by half. From 1936 onwards, Bydgoszcz cable factory supplied cables for the electrification of the Polish State Railways.

In 1930, "Kabel Polski", together with six other Polish companies sent representatives -Tadeusz Gayczak and Felicjan Karśnicki- to the International Cable Cartel in London to enter the association. In return, each Polish firm got a registered trademark in the form of colored threads identifying their products. The Bydgoszcz facility recognition sign was a twist of blue and white thread coloring the coating.

Working conditions in the company were better than the average in the area of Bydgoszcz, with regards to salaries. The direction was politically close to the Christian democracy and the local union belonged to the "Union of Catholic Societies of Polish Workers" (Polish: Katolickie Stowarzyszenie Robotników Polskich). The management funded scholarships for employees and set up a sporting club "Kabel Polski Bydgoszcz".

In 1938, the Warsaw firm "Siła i świat" raised its shares in the company up to 95% by buying shares from foreign investors. In 1939, in terms of sales and employment, "Bydgoszcz Cable Factory" was the third most important factory in Poland after Kraków's and Ożarów's plants.

=== German occupation ===
On September 5, 1939, Polish military authorities ordered two carriages of machines to be sent further east, to Ożarów. During the invasion of Poland, the train was bombed near Kutno, but by the autumn 1939, it returned to Bydgoszcz.

On October 20, 1939, Stanisław Rolbieski and his family were executed in Las Gdański, the northern forest district, as part of the German repressions against the people of Bydgoszcz.

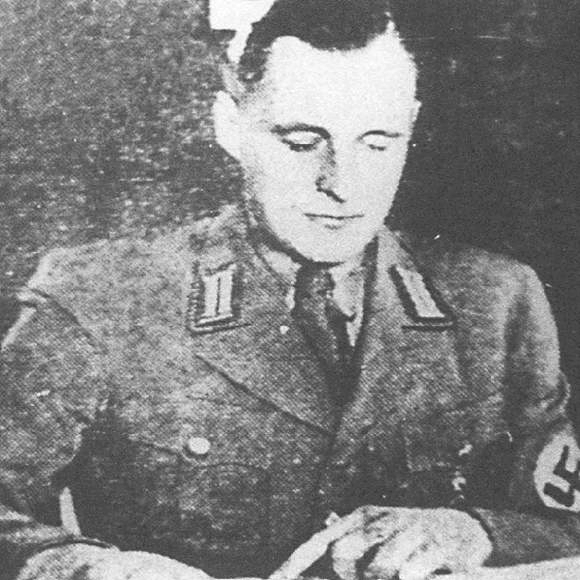
W. Kampe, 1939

In the first years of the German occupation, the Bydgoszcz Cable Factory was owned by the consortium "Hermann Göring Werke", liable to the "Haupttreuhandstelle Ost" (Trust Office East) in Katowice. The plant was managed by Germans, while Poles worked as workers

In 1940, Werner Kampe, the then Nazi mayor of Bydgoszcz, delivered an anti-Polish speech at the factory. On March 13, 1942, Nazi authorities handed over the factory to the consortium "Felten-Guilleaume AG" in Vienna. During that year, two halls were built: a repair hangar and a storage area, still preserved on the west side of the main hall.

During the war, the factory produced wires with plastic insulation and cables, mainly for rail transport and mail. Copper and natural rubber were replaced by aluminum and synthetic rubber. The plant produced exclusively for the needs of the German market, including for the arms industry.

Concurrently, the firm had been employing up to 700 people. They were reinforced by 30 Soviet POW in 1942. The Polish workers sabotaged the plant in many ways and were punished with deportation to concentration camps. In January 1945, as the Soviet forces were approaching, German military could neither manage to remove the machines nor blow up the facility.

=== PRL period ===
After the war, "Kabel Polski" was the only earth-cable factory in Poland that survived the conflict unscathed. In addition, in the spring of 1945, the machinery escaped the planned deportation to Soviet Union. As soon as 1945, the facility started to produce cables for the reconstruction of Polish major cities, including Warsaw.

In the summer 1947, Marian Rejewski, the outstanding mathematician and cryptologist, had the position of director of the sales department at the cable manufacturing company. After nationalization in 1948, the factory was given the name "Pomorskie Zakłady Wytwórcze Materiałów Elektrotechnicznych im. gen. Karol Świerczewski" ("Karol Świerczewski Pomeranian Electrotechnical Materials Manufacturing Plant"); it employed 759 people. Soon in 1950, the number of employees exceeded 1000.

On the compound, new socialist realism-inspired buildings appeared: a fire station (1947), a community center (1950) and an additional boiler room (1959). A further expansion was planned several times but never realized. A canteen stood on the premises, supplied from 1952 to 1958 by its own farm located in Łąsko Wielkie and in the 1960s a factory holiday center was built in the sea-side city of Stegna.

In the 1950s and 1960s, the facility still relied on pre-war infrastructure and depleted machinery park and investments were sparse. In 1960, some machines were 80% worn out and beyond repair. Moreover, the ex-Bydgoszcz Cable Factory was the least sustained plant among the cable factories in Poland. The situation improved temporarily between 1957 and 1963, when a batch of new machines was purchased, in particular from Western countries. Nevertheless, as the socialist economy insisted more on the quantity, the quality of production became a matter of secondary importance. Hence, the use of poor-quality materials and semi-finished products (PVC, copper, lead, rubber) combined with obsolete production technology severely lowered the production standard: only 15% of the produced cables could pass the quality test in this period (1950s–1960s).

In the years 1956–1960, a rubber plant was built and the draw bench was expanded. Several new products were launched:

- flush-mounted cables (1952);
- power cables with PVC coating supplied from the local firm "Zachem" (1961);
- cables for long-distance telephone, mining, ship, aviation (1969). Such articles were used, for instance, in the Fiat 126p, televisions and for radiocommunication or radiolocation purposes.

In the 1970s, export contracts were signed with USSR, Czechoslovakia, East Germany, Yugoslavia, Switzerland, Turkey, Lebanon, Singapore and the United Arab Republic.

In 1970, "Polkabel", a cable industry combine (Polish: Kombinat Przemysłu Kabli) was established in Kraków, gathering 11 plants in the country (Kraków, Bydgoszcz, Ożarów Mazowiecki, Czechowice-Dziedzice, Szczecin, Będzin, Legnica and Ełk). In this new structure, "Bydgoska Fabryka Kabli" was a leading factory for the production of power and signaling cables, coated in PVC and in rubber, making for 15% of the entire combine output.

From 1972 to 1976, major investments took place:

- the medium voltage machinery was replaced (1973);
- new technological lines were installed;
- the draw bench department was modernized;
- construction of a new production hall for the low voltage cable department.

In 1973, the factory pioneered in the country the production of polyethylene coated power cables, and in 1976, the manufacturing of high voltage cables. At that time "Bydgoska Fabryka Kabli" supplied cables to the entire Polish shipbuilding industry. In the 1970s, a project was launched to raze the historic structure to re-build modern halls, but it was never carried out.

At the beginning of the 1980s, the production of cables collapsed and employment was reduced by 25%: due to economic sanctions in retaliation of the introduction of martial law in Poland, no polyethylene was delivered from United States. From 1981 onwards, 20% of the total production was exported and the ratio kept increasing. "Bydgoska Fabryka Kabli" shipped items abroad to Belgium, West Germany, United Kingdom, France, Finland, Austria, Sweden, Bulgaria, United States, India, Iraq, Iran, Libya, Egypt and Kuwait. In 1985 a long-term cooperation with Nokia company began. In 1989, "BFK" was the 4th cable company in Poland in terms of volume production and employment, making for 13% of the domestic sales.

From 1956 to 1980, "Bydgoska Fabryka Kabli" employed more than 1200 employees, with a peak in 1980 (1430 workers).

=== Post-PRL period (since 1989) ===
On March 15, 1993, the plant became the ownership of the Polish State Treasury, under the name Bydgoska Fabryka Kabli S.A. (BFK SA) The Bydgoszcz facility was then identified as a pilot site for privatization, among 12 cable industry companies. On September 22, 1993, "Bydgoska Fabryka Kabli S.A." was sold to a consortium consisting of "Elektrim" (60%) and mBank (20%). The 20% left was shared within the staff. The price was 17 million USD and the purchasers pledged to invest 45 million USD over the next 5 years. The factory also ceded its workers' flats, hotel and holiday resort. In 1994, 25% of shares were introduced to the Warsaw Stock Exchange.

The capital from privatization was invested into the modernization and the development of the site. As the business resumed its growth, new developments appeared:

- a new department for rubber-insulated cables (1993);
- a new telecommunication cable department opened in a newly built hall (1994);
- enlargement of the medium and high voltage cables production (1995);
- launch of the production of optical fiber cables (1997);
- renovation of the low voltage cables department (1999).

In 1992, the ISO 9002 certificate was delivered to the firm.

From 1994 to 1998, the historic pre-war production and administration buildings were restored under the supervision of the municipal monuments conservator. The laboratory was modernized and the sales, marketing & promotion department was set up in an area newly purchased.

In 1993, BFK SA made 20% of the cable market in Poland in general: even 40% for electrical cables and 80% for high voltage cables. The vast majority of the sells were performed through the Elektrim company and 30% was sold abroad. In 1998, the sales amounted to approximately 100 million USD.

At the end of the 1990s, the downturn in the world market forced a consolidation of the Polish cable industry. On February 17, 1999, several cable factories (Bydgoszcz, Ożarów Mazowiecki and Szczecin) merged into the holding "Elektrim Kable S.A.". The entity controlled more than half of the domestic cable market and was the 9th producer in Europe. Under this new organisation, "BFK SA" specialized in the production of power cables.

The company Telefonika Kable S.A. or "TF Kable", founded in 1992 in Myślenice near Kraków, bought on January 7, 2002, a controlling share of capital. In 2003, it acquired the entire block of shares in Elektrim. On June 9, 2003, "TeleFonika Kable S.A." re-structured its production network: "Bydgoska Fabryka Kabli" became "Zakład Bydgoszcz" (Bydgoszcz plant), specializing in the production of electrical power cables. The same year a new production hall for medium and high voltage cables was constructed in the premises.

"TF Kable" acquired in 2019, "JDR Cables", a leading provider of subsea cable technology and offshore services. A year later, the R&D centre has been be extended and the infrastructure for testing high voltage AC and DC power cables upgraded.

In 2020, the Bydgoszcz plant celebrated the 100th anniversary of the creation of the factory.

== Architecture ==
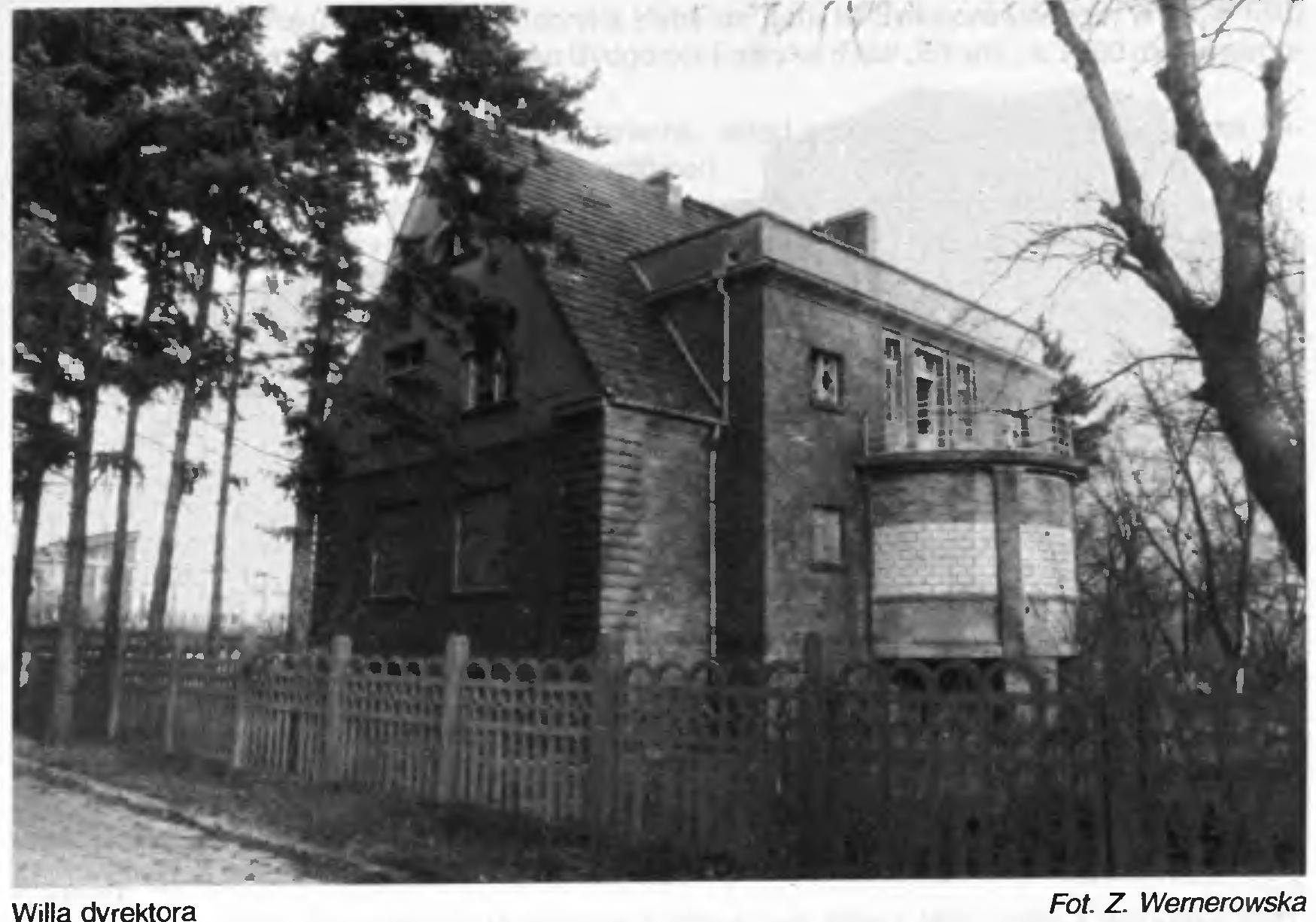
Residential building for families on the plant premises. Villa demolished during new investments in 2010–2012

The oldest factory buildings that survived till today were erected in 1920–1924:

- the Art Nouveau main gate (1921);
- an office building;
- the production hall;
- the water tower;
- the former engine rooms.

These edifices still display their carefully developed architectural details. The main hall designed by Bronisław Jankowski exhibits the modernist architectural style of the interwar period. It is visible from Fordońska Street. In the back of the factory, by the Brda river, still stands the modernist villa of the director, built in 1931.

== Gallery ==
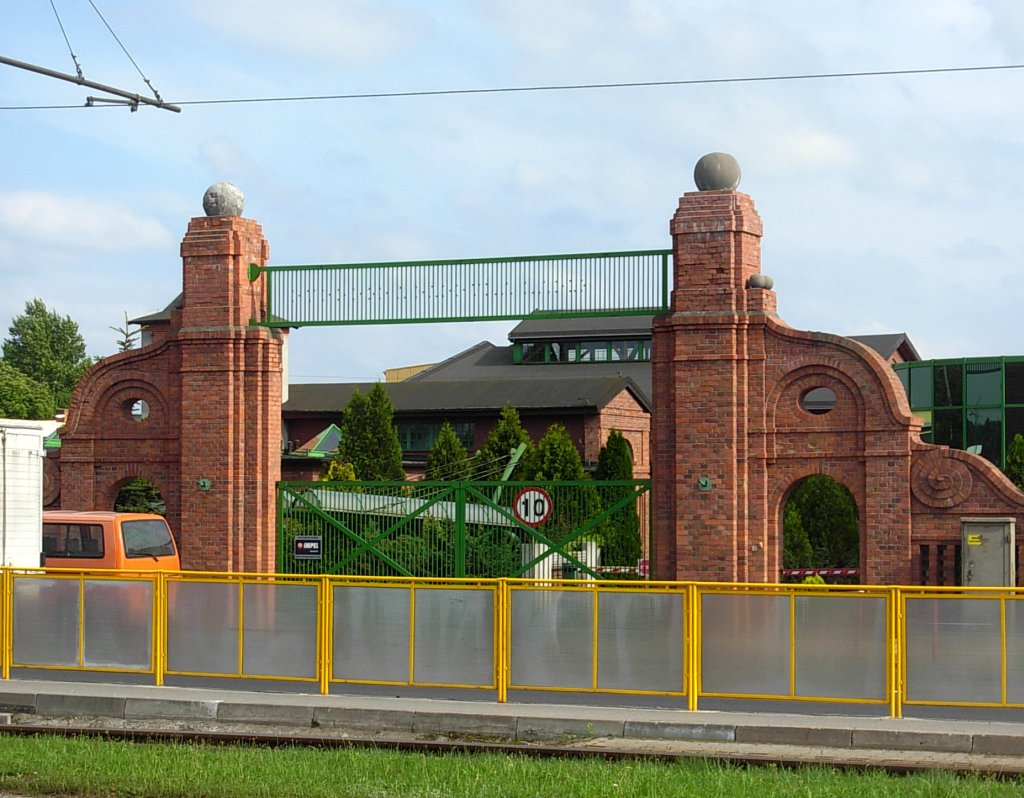
Former Art Nouveau main gate

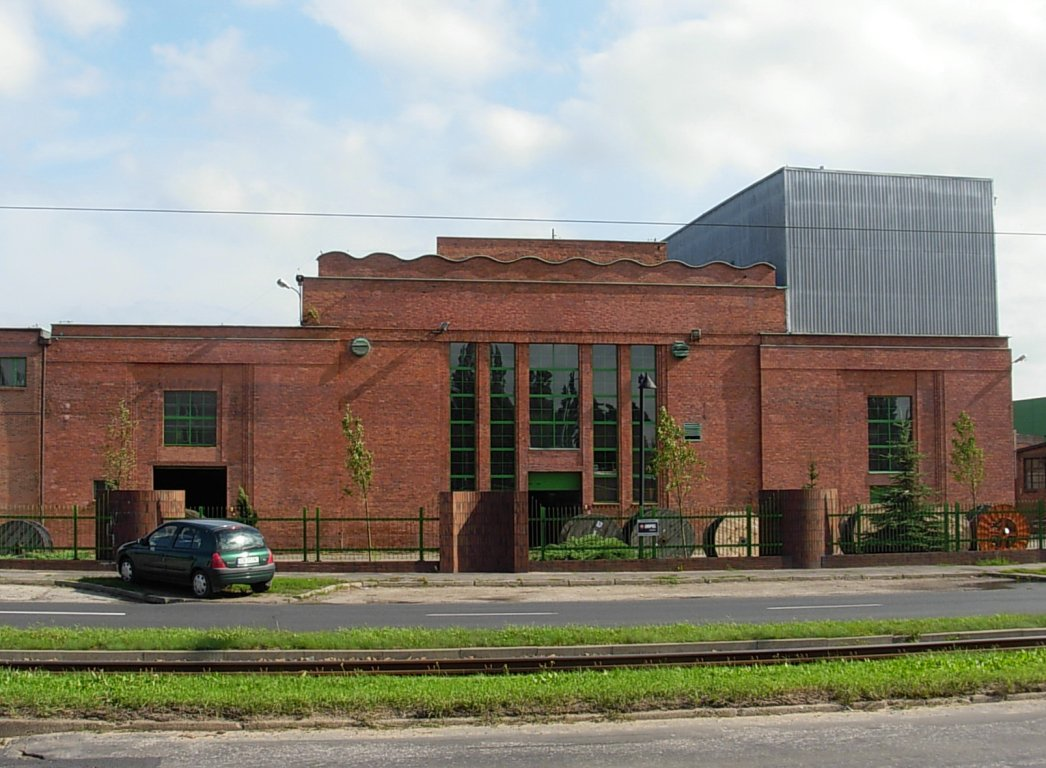
Main hall, 1920-1924

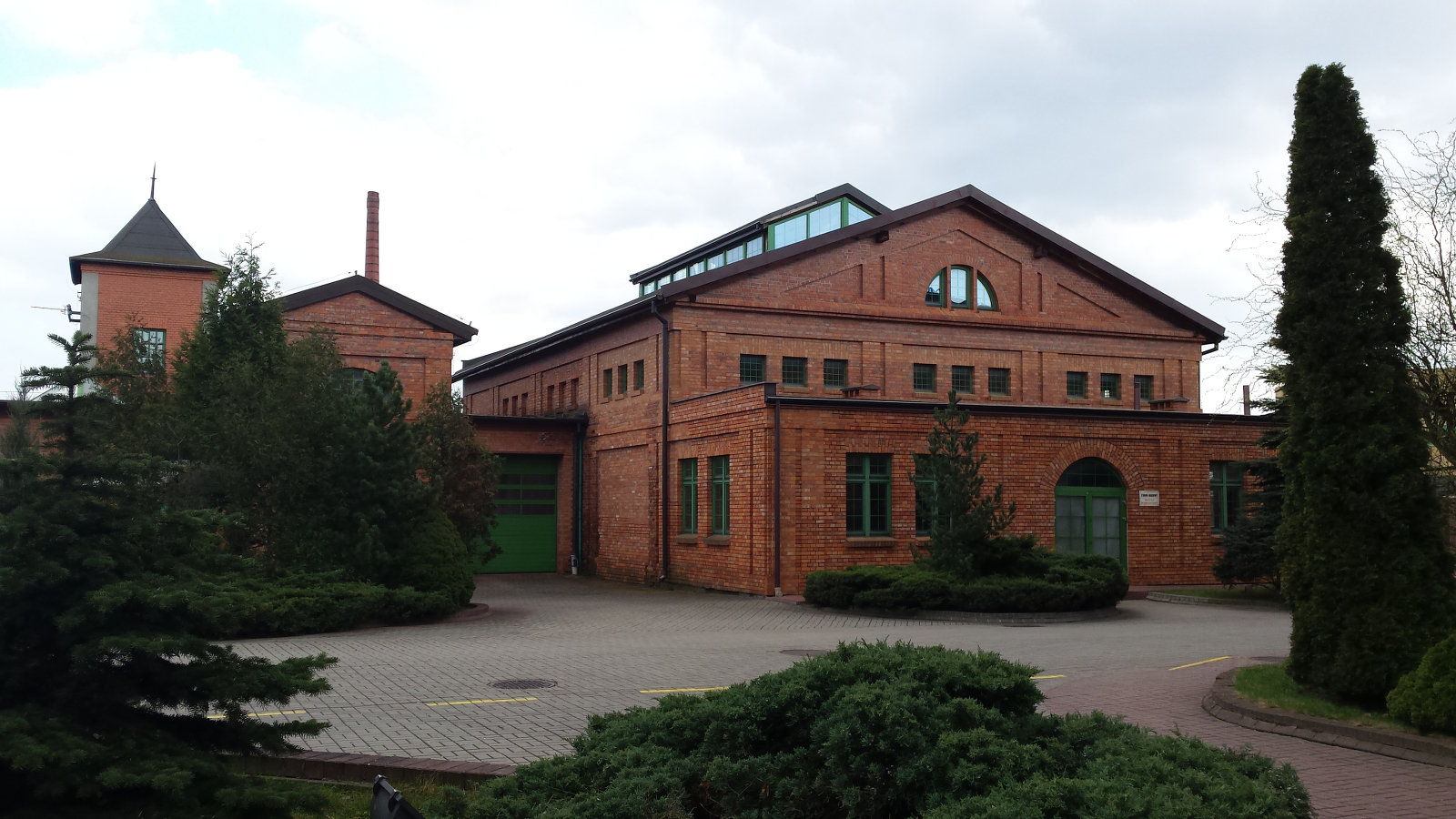
Former administrative building

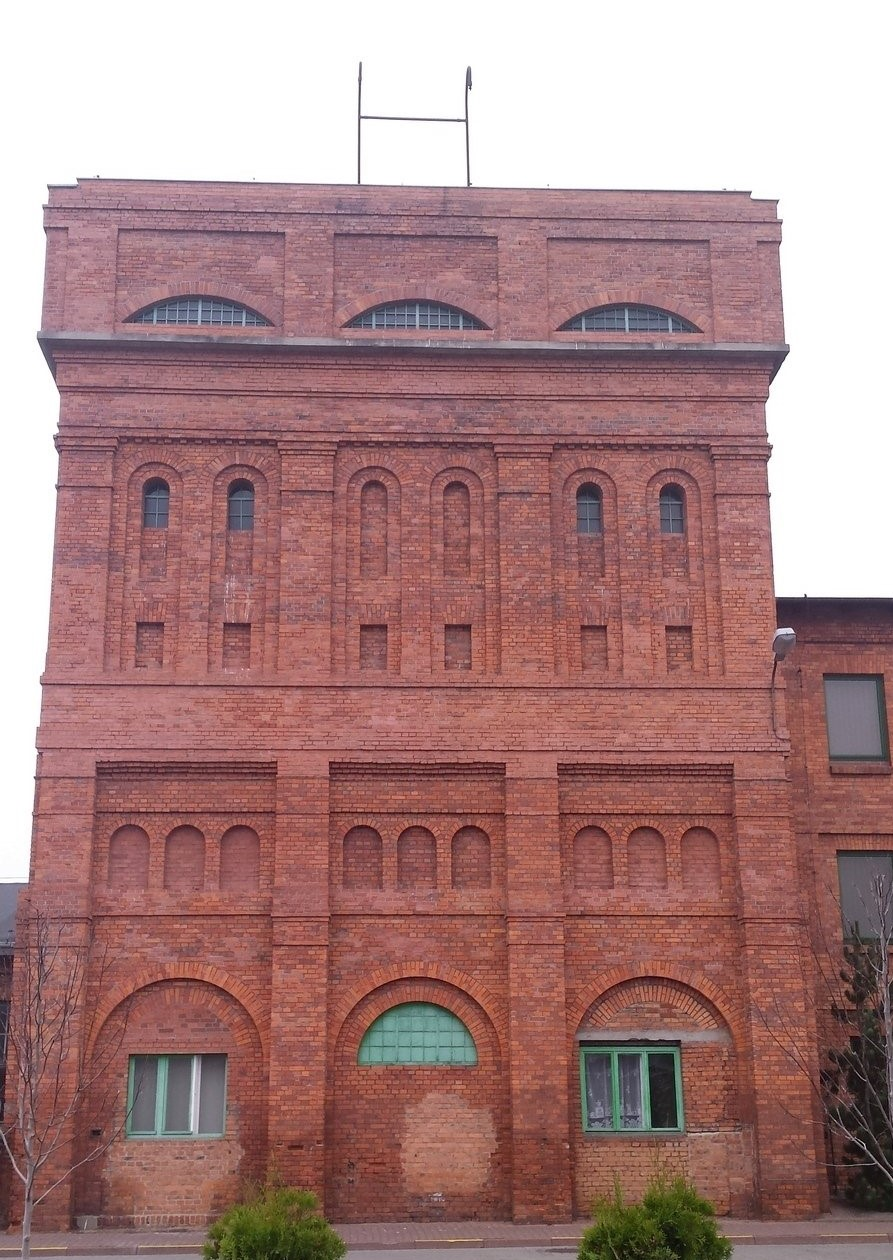
Former water tower

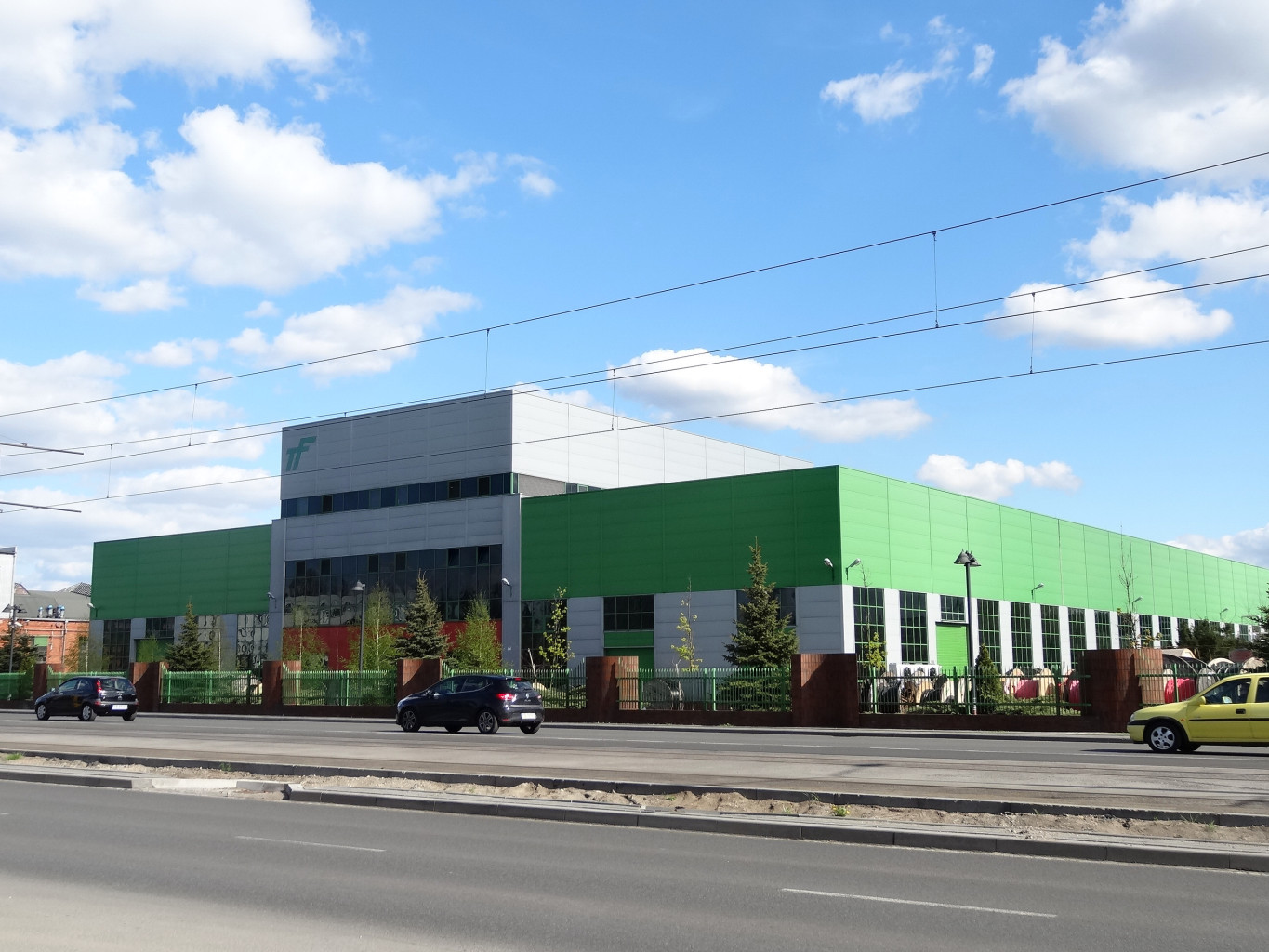
Latest production plant, view from Fordońska Street

== See also ==
- Bydgoszcz
- Tele-Fonika Kable

== Bibliography ==
- (in Polish) Umiński, Janusz (2014). Kabel Polski, Kabel Bydgoski. Bydgoszcz: Towarzystwo Miłośników Miasta Bydgoszczy.
- (in Polish) Chamot, Jan (1974). Towarzystwo Akcyjne "Kabel Polski". Kronika Bydgoska IV. Bydgoszcz: Towarzystwo Miłosnikow Miasta Bydgoszczy - Bydgoskie Towarzystwo Naukowe. pp. 116–136.
- (in Polish) Grzybowska Maria, Wernerowska Zofia (1997). Architektura przemysłowa lat 20. i 30. XX w. – Bydgoska Fabryka Kabli S.A. "KABEL". Materiały do dziejów kultury i sztuki Bydgoszczy i regionu. Zeszyt 2. Bydgoszcz: Pracownia Dokumentacji i Popularyzacji Zabytków Wojewódzkiego Ośrodka Kultury w Bydgoszczy. pp. 83–90.
- (in Polish) Chamot, Jan (1973). Bydgoska Fabryka Kabli 1923-1973. Zarys historyczno-socjologiczny. Bydgoszcz: Przedsiębiorstwo Wydawniczo-Handlowe Druków Akcydensowych.
- (in Polish) Derenda, Jerzy (1994). Tak trzymać, czyli "Kabel" na fali. Rozmowa z dyrektorem "Kabla" – mgr inż. Janem Wieluńskim. Kalendarz Bydgoski. Bydgoszcz: Towarzystwo Miłośników Miasta Bydgoszczy. pp. 74–77.
