= Żegluga Bydgoska =

Inland Shipping Company, 1891, Bydgoszcz, Poland

Coordinates: 53°07′32″N 18°05′54″E

Bydgoszcz Shipping
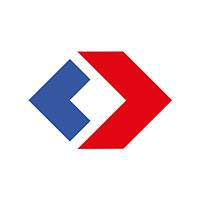

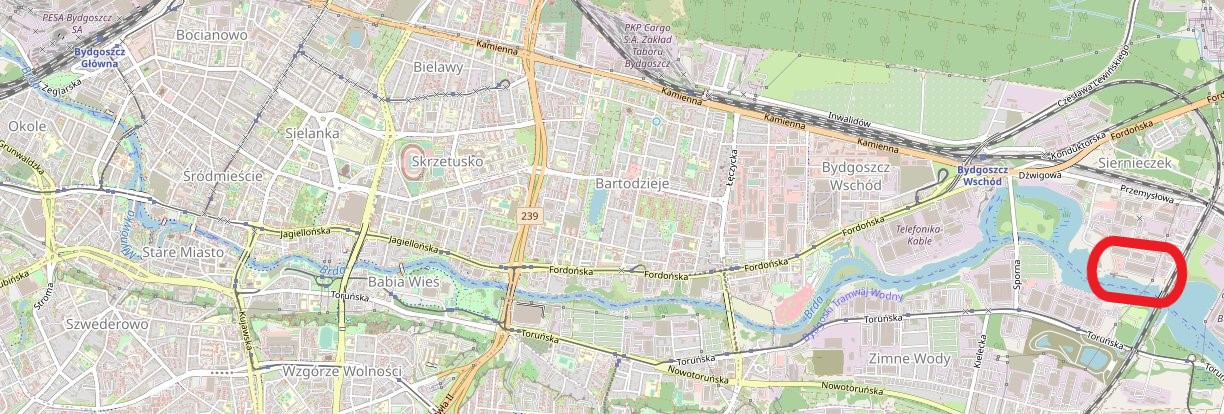
- Location in Bydgoszcz
- Native name: Żegluga Bydgoska
- Company type: Private
- Industry: Shipping line
- Founded: 1891; 134 years ago in Bydgoszcz, Kingdom of Prussia
- Founder: A. Aronson
- Headquarters: Wrocław, Poland
- Products: Inland shipping
- Website: otlogistics.pl

Żegluga Bydgoska (English: Bydgoszcz Shipping) is a Polish inland shipping company based in Bydgoszcz. Its first existence dates back to 1869, when a shipping firm was established in then Bromberg.

Since August 12, 2009, it has been integrated into Wrocław's group "OT Logistics S.A.".

== History ==
Inland navigation in Bydgoszcz emerged in the 14th century, as confirmed by the earliest known written records of sailing on the Brda river.

A shipping corporation was established in 1487, in Bydgoszcz, its statute signed by Andrzej Kościelecki, then Starosta of the city. At that time, Bydgoszcz was one of the few cities of the Polish–Lithuanian Commonwealth which had a river shipping professional association; the others were located in Gdańsk, Toruń, Kazimierz Dolny and Jarosław. Furthermore, a Helmsman guild was created in 1591, by the City Council. At the end of the 16th century, this brotherhood consisted of about 80 steersmen and helpers, called Pomagrami.

=== Prussian period ===
The intensive development of Bromberg/Bydgoszcz industry in the second half of the 19th century led to an increase in shipping traffic on both Vistula and Brda rivers. In addition, water towing transport has been already used for goods and lumber since 1870, on the two rivers and along the Bydgoszcz Canal towards inland Germany.

To manage those flows, a first company using modern tugboats and barges was created on June 3, 1869, by the banker A. Aronson. On January 20, 1883, the company was renamed Bromberger Schleppschiffahrt F.W. Bumke (English: Bydgoszcz tugboat F.W. Bumke), then again on August 29, 1891, as Bromberger Schleppschiffahrt Aktien Gesellschaft (English: Bydgoszcz Shipping and Towing joint-stock Company). Its shareholders were: Lewin Louis Aronsohn, a banker and a commercial counselor and Heinrich Dietz, Fritz Kleindienst, Karl Wenzel and Emil Werckmeister, city councilors.

The company had the concession for chain-towing and shipping on the Brda River, from the city locks to the Vistula River. It possessed:

- two chain tugs;
- "Victor", a screw steamer;
- a machine factory in the eastern district of "Zimne Wody";
- an estate in the village of "Czersko Polskie", comprising a distillery.

The seat of the company was in Bydgoszcz and its offices were located at today's 17 Grodzka Street on the Brda river bank.

During Prussian times, the company's Supervisory Board was chaired by mayors of Bydgoszcz (e.g. Hugo Braesicke, Alfred Knobloch, Paul Mitzlaff) and city councilor Heinrich Dietz. Louis Aronsohn was the deputy chairman for many years and many well-known German merchants, manufacturers and bankers from Bydgoszcz and the region were members of the board, such as Emil Werckmeister, Max Francke or Wilhelm Blumwe.

The company purchased plots of land in villages around Bydgoszcz, today integrated as city districts: "Zimne Wody", "Kapuściska", "Siernieczek" with a folwark and "Czersko Polskie" with a mill and a brickyard. It passed agreements with the city council and the Prussian State. On the one hand, in exchange to repaying 4% of its profits to the city, the shipping firm took over the taxing rights and obligations of the municipality. On the other hand, following the contract concluded with the State Treasury, the Prussian government had to improve the condition of the waterways between the Vistula and the Oder rivers. It was also stated that two dead water branches of the river in "Zimne Wody" were to be handed out to the company. In return, the shipping enterprise was bound to establish and equip a river harbour on the left bank of the Brda river.

In 1891, the towing company opened a machine factory and a shipyard in "Zimne Wody". The factory produced, among others, steam boilers, cranes, steel structures and tow chains. The best seller product was the equipment for spirit distillery, which, by 1918, had been sold to over a thousand plants in Germany and abroad. The shipyard was manufacturing screw steamers, berlinkas and other river ships, out of wood and steel; in addition, the facility was used to repair the floating rolling stock.

In 1892, a steam brickyard and a sawmill were opened in "Czersk Polski", which at the beginning of the 20th century processed 30,000 m³ of wood. A second and larger sawmill, with a wood capacity of 55,000 m³, was built in 1899 in "Siernieczek". Both places were linked to the railway network via sidings. Besides, the company had another plant, a steam distillery, in "Czersk Polski". Lastly, the firm possessed several farms, in "Siernieczek" (1 farm), "Zimne Wody" (2 farms) and "Ściersk" (1).

In 1897, the Prussian government approved the river harbour project in "Zimne Wody", designed by the company. The same year, the Water Construction Office in Bromberg (Polish: Urząd Budownictwa Wodnego w Bydgoszczy) realized large works in the river meander, allowing the shipping company to lay down a road (present day Sporna street) through the newly created island (today's "Island on Zimne Wody", Polish: Wyspa na Zimnych Wodach) by the means of two steel bridges, hence connecting "Weg Chausse nach Fordon" with "Thornerstraβe" (today Fordońska and Toruńska streets). An oxbow lake on the Brda was identified for the location of the future port basin. Its construction took seven years (1897-1904). In addition, the scheme required to set up, among others, access railway and sidings, storage yards, warehouses for loading/unloading wagons/ships, and steam cranes. At the beginning of the 20th century, the port was able to handle up to 2,000 wagons per year.

In the 1910s, the Bydgoszcz Shipping Society built workers housing estates in "Zimne Wody", "Czersk Polski", and restaurants near the port and the machine factory (1905). The company also had its own Health Fund, which provided social benefits to its employees.

From 1905 to 1920, the firm developed further, taking over cargo shipping between Gdańsk and Bydgoszcz as well as other towns along the Vistula river up to Toruń. By 1919, a local branch was established in Gdańsk and representative offices for goods shipment were set up in Tczew, Gniew, Korzeniewo, Nowe and Świecie.

The creation and operation of the Bydgoszcz Shipping Society had an undeniable impact on boosting the industry and trade, as well as transforming the eastern city suburbs into an industrial area (i.e. today's districts: "Bydgoszcz Wschód", "Zimne Wody", "Siernieczek" and "Brdyujście").

=== Interwar period (1920–1939) ===
With the takeover of Bydgoszcz back to Polish hands on January 19, 1920, the company had its name changed to Lloyd Bydgoski, Bromberger Schleppschiffahrt, Towarzystwo Akcyjne (English: Lloyd Bydgoski, Bydgoszcz Tugboat Company, Joint Stock Society) with Polish citizens as members of the management board, such as engineer Stanisław Rolbieski. Since the city council owned 52% of the shares, the Supervisory Board was always chaired by the mayor of Bydgoszcz.

The geostrategic changes stemmed out of the Treaty of Versailles brought changes in the political boundaries, reducing the shipping traffic on the Vistula-Oder waterway. In addition most of the German employees were forced to leave the city: therefore, the company, in a dire economic situation between 1920 and 1925, had workers brought from the Greater Poland Voivodeship and Galicia. While the Lloyd's transshippment harbour, distillery and the sawmills had a low activity, the shipyard, the brickyard and the machine factory were working at full speed. The late 1920s saw rapid fluctuations in the timber demand and an increase in the water transport via the Vistula river to the detriment of the Bydgoszcz Canal and the transshipping operations of "Zimne Wody" port.

From 1923 to 1930, Bernard Śliwiński then president of Bydgoszcz, became the chairman of the Supervisory Board. His support and interventions helped the company to survive through the volatile economic climate generated by the years of inflation and the German–Polish customs war. On May 30, 1931, the shareholders adopted a resolution changing the company's name to: Lloyd Bydgoski Towarzystwo Akcyjna. The same year, the city of Bydgoszcz became the company's majority shareholder, minor shareholders being: the shipping company Lloyd Polski (16%), Karbid Wielkopolski (11%) and Berlin's company "David Francke & Söhne" (6%). In 1933, Leon Barciszewski, the last mayor of pre-war Bydgoszcz, became the chairman of the Lloyd's Supervisory Board.

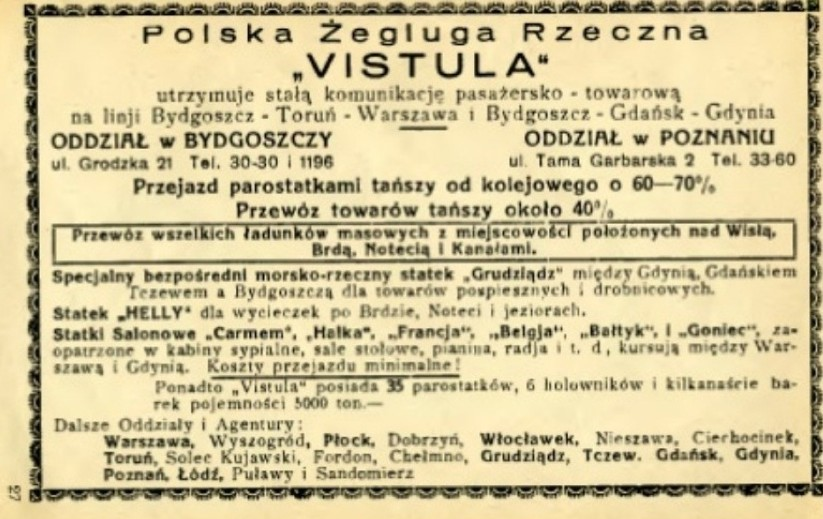
Advertising for passengers and goods transport during interwar

Business started to improve from 1926 onwards. Lloyd Bydgoski kept a constant towing traffic of "colonial goods" (rice, tanning extracts) from Gdańsk to Warsaw, transporting on the way back (in particular from Płock and Włocławek) grain for Gdańsk. In 1926, the transshipment harbour handled 62,000 tons of coal towards Gdańsk. This year, the company opened a branch in Warsaw, followed a few years later by an agency in Poznań. In 1928, the firm sold to the city of Bydgoszcz several assets: Sporna Street, two iron bridges and irrigation fields located in "Kapuściska" and "Czersko Polskie".

The years of the Great Depression (1931–1933) stroke a heavy blow on the fragile economic balance of the company. In order to survive, Lloyd Bydgoski had to forsake many investments and ventures together with curtailing the production of its industrial plants. Thereby, the company sold the sawmill and the distillery in "Czersk Polski", while, to make matters worse, the second sawmill in Siernieczek burnt down in 1931, and lease the brickyard and the farms it owned. From 1934 on, despite the general economic lull and the increase in freight shipping, the company's financial health did not improve, since the profits were partially covering the accumulated losses, overdue taxes and social benefits.

In 1934, Lloyd Bydgoski possessed 19 ships and 17 barges, with branches in Warsaw, Gdańsk and Włocławek. His water network embraced the Brda and Vistula rivers as well as the Bydgoszcz canal. In order to adapt to market, it contracted skippers with their own barges to transport goods. In addition to freight, the shipping firm also conducted passenger transport on the Brda and Vistula rivers: on Sundays and public holidays, steam tugs were used as cruise ships.

Lloyd Bydgoski's shipment (1934-1938):

Year	Goods [Thousand tons]	Cereals [Thousand tons]	Sugar [Thousand tons]
1934	235	134	64
1935	257	155	70
1936	243	154	60
1937	172		
1938	222		

During the interwar period, Lloyd Bydgoski was one of the largest shipping companies in Poland, despite the financial struggles it experienced in the late 1930s.

=== German Occupation ===
After the outbreak of World War II, Bydgoszcz was seized by the Wehrmacht: the company's assets were confiscated by the German Central Trust Office-East (German: Haupttreuhandstelle Ost). A receivership was launched in court but was suspended on September 3, 1942.

The main shareholder of the Society during the occupation became the company "Preussische Bergwerks- und Hütten Aktiengesellschaft" or "Preussag" from Berlin, the ancestor of today's TUI Group. The firm's name was reverted to its original Prussian one, "Bromberger Schleppschiffahrt Aktiengesellschat". In addition, only Germans were allowed to sit on the Supervisory Board, like Walter Ernst. The company had still branches in Warsaw, Poznań and Gdańsk, main offices located in Naklo, Czarnków, Ujście, Gorzów Wielkopolski and Międzychód, with representatives present in Grudziądz, Płock and Włocławek.

Within the new political order, the company's scope changed radically and concentrated anew to the east-west flow, towards Germany, as it used to be under Prussia times. To ease this process, an ambitious construction project was put up, but never completed: digging north of the Brda river a lateral channel, for 1000-tons capacity ships, bypassing the city from Osowa Góra western district to Fordon eastern district.

During this period, German motor barges traveled through the Bydgoszcz Canal and the Vistula River from Third Reich territory to East Prussia, carrying coal and other raw material. The shipping traffic was very intensive due to the use of rail transport capacity by Wehrmacht. The "Bromberger Schleppschiffahrt Aktiengesellschat" operated almost until the end of the conflict, supporting the nazi war effort.

=== Post World War II period (1945-1990) ===
After Bydgoszcz was liberated from German occupation, the company passed back into Polish hands. During the fights in the region, the company and its employees brought help to he Soviet troops:

- construction of a floating bridge near Chełmno with tugboats and barges (March 2, 1945);
- construction of a bridge with barges over the Vistula river after the liberation of Grudziądz.

For these actions, the shipping firm was awarded Soviet medals. By a ministerial decision on March 7, 1945, a compulsory state administration was established over the firm. During the war, 7 ships and 9 barges had been destroyed or lost: in 1945, only 8 towing ships and 8 barges were serviceable. Not only was the rolling stock ruined, but also the real estate and warehouses in Warsaw and Gdańsk had burned down. Nonetheless, the shipping company was at that time the "second largest" water transport company in Poland.

In 1947, the District Liquidation Office (Polish: Główny Urząd Likwidacyjny), a governmental body managing "abandoned property", transferred the company and its assets to the city of Bydgoszcz. On February 13, 1948, "Lloyd Bydgoski" was nationalized by a decision of the Minister of Communications. On March 1, 1951, the crew of private barges were included into the permanent employees of the company.

Contrary to the interwar period, after 1945 the company only focused on shipping activities and got rid of other assets not related to this function: the brickyard was transferred to the "Union of Ceramics Construction" (1951), farms were first moved to private tenants, then to state farms (1950). The sawmill and the distillery had already been sold before World War II.

In the 1950s, "LLoyd Bydgoski" experienced a period of dramatic organizational changes. On January 1, 1952, it became the "Shipping Department on the Vistula in Bydgoszcz" (Polish: Ekspozytura Żeglugi na Wiśle w Bydgoszczy), with its own accounting and balance sheets. Its assets included:

- repair bases in Bydgoszcz and Chełmno;
- a main branch in Gdańsk;
- subordinate branches in Toruń, Grudziądz, Tczew and Gorzów Wielkopolski;
- a river port in Poznań.

At that time, the company operated under the name "Inland Navigation" (Polish: Żegluga Śródlądowa) and then "Shipping on the Vistula" (Polish: Żegluga na Wiśle). In 1954, the enterprise was reorganized: its name changed to "Bydgoszcz Shipping on the Vistula" (Polish: Bydgoska Żegluga na Wisle) and it became subordinated to the Ministry of Shipping, under the "Union of Inland Navigation and River Shipyard". As the company expanded its activity to other waterways out of the Vistula River, its name turned into Żegluga Bydgoska in 1962.

Żegluga Bydgoska structure was organized as follows:

- management offices in Bydgoszcz;
- commercial ports in Bydgoszcz, Ujście, Krzyż Wielkopolski, Kostrzyn nad Odrą, Malbork and Włocławek;
- a reloading stations in Elbląg and Barcin;
- repair bases in Bydgoszcz, Chełmno and Czarnków;
- field offices in Gdańsk, Grudziądz, Toruń, Gorzów Wielkopolski and Szczecin;
- a service station in Bielinek.

Company's network covered:

- the lower Vistula from Płock to Gdańsk;
- the Vistula-Oder waterway;
- the "Górnonotecki Canal", connecting the "Bydgoszcz canal" with Lake Gopło through the upper Noteć;
- the Warta river from Luboń to the mouth of the river;
- the Oder river;
- Western Europe waterways (Germany, Belgium, Netherlands, France, Switzerland, Luxembourg).

During the first decade after 1945, most of the company's rolling stock pre-dated World War I, being mainly steam-powered units and wooden barges. To make it worse in 1948-1949, 34 large barges from the operational fleet were handed over to a Shipping firm on the Oder river by the order of the Ministry of Communications. The necessary modernization of the fleet took place in 1955, with the purchase of 2 diesel tugs. A major overhaul happened in the 1960s and 1970s, with the acquisition of about 100 new units. One can mention, among other assets, motor barges, pusher boats, inland tankers and passenger ships ("Ondyna" for Bydgoszcz, "Dziwożona" for Poznań and "Wodnik" for Toruń ) which transported 120,000 persons in 1972.

In the 1950s, the bulk of the goods shipped was Soviet iron ore, transiting from rail wagons in Bydgoszcz and Poznań ports towards Szczecin's steel mills. On the way back, barges were loaded with demolition bricks and firewood, on route to Warsaw. Other goods transported at that time were cement, grain, sugar beet, sugar, hemp, fascine and potatoes. At the end of the 1950s, Żegluga Bydgoska was freighting annually an average of 200,000 tons of goods.

From the 1960s, Żegluga Bydgoska had been training its captains and mechanics: between 1960 and 1976, more than 2,800 people were trained in 5 different professions (seaman, boatswain, helmsman, lieutenant and inland navigation captain). In this period, international shipping developed, to Cuba first, then in 1963, with Western countries. From 1965 to 1970, Polish vessels shipped to West Germany, Netherlands, Belgium and Luxembourg 20 different types of goods. In the winter, when Polish rivers were frozen, around 45 Bydgoszcz Shipping units were working on the Rhine river for German domestic market.

A change in the transport strategy occurred in the 1970s, as Żegluga Bydgoska turned to industrial mass transport, which made in 1977, 95% of its annual cargo. National shipment dealt for the main part with:

- construction materials, from the Vistula river to Bydgoszcz and Malbork river ports;
- fertiliser transported from Police to Krzyż and Ujście;
- limestone from Barcin to Bydgoszcz;
- coal and iron ore between Szczecin/Świnoujście seaports and Lower Silesia.

From 1975 on, In the second half of the 1970s, a regular shipment of heating oil started from Szczecin towards West Berlin. Żegluga Bydgoska began to be specialized in the transport of oversize-sized or over-weight equipements.

In the 1974, the river port in Bydgoszcz completed its renovation. Ports in Poznań, Ujście, Krzyż and Kostrzyn were modernized as well.

Żegluga Bydgoska's shipment (1955-1981):

Year	Shipment [Thousand tons]
1955	214
1960	298
1965	443
1970	998
1972	1176
1973	1116
1975	1720
1979	3372
1981	1506

A considerable deterioration of the economic situation of the enterprise occurred in the 1980s, with a stagnation, assets losing value and a suspension of investments. Hence, a year after its heyday in 1980, Żegluga Bydgoska was threatened with bankruptcy. Significant drops in transshipments were also recorded in all the other river ports belonging to the firm. In 1982, its annual cargo had dwindled by 50%.

In reaction, part of the fleet was moved to the Oder river and the Szczecin-Świnoujście route. To a greater extent, international transport was encouraged, such as transport between Western European ports, shipment on East Germany waterways, towards West Berlin, West Germany, Belgium or the Netherlands. In the 1990s, transport abroad already accounted for 80 to 90% of all the company freight.

=== Modern period (1990-2010) ===
On November 30, 1995, Żegluga Bydgoska was transformed into a joint-stock company. Half of the shares were held by the "National Investment Fund", 25% by the State Treasury, 15% by employees and the left shares by private investors.

In 2000, the company was one of the two largest inland shipowners in Poland with Odratrans S.A. from Wrocław. Its foreign freight represented 70% of its total activity. Żegluga Bydgoska assets comprised:

- commercial harbours in Bydgoszcz, Malbork, Kostrzyn, Poznań, Ujście;
- repair bases in Bydgoszcz, Czarnków and Chełmno leased to a sister branch, "Stocznie Śródmieście Żeglugi Bydgoskiej Sp. z o.o.";
- 46 motor barges (22,028 t total tonnage);
- 64 pushed barges (31,575 t);
- 30 pusher boats;
- 2 tugs;
- 6 pontoon boats.

In December 2004, Odratrans S.A., Żegluga Bydgoska's main domestic competitor, took over a controlling stake of the capital. On August 12, 2009, the company Żegluga Bydgoska-Odratrans was entirely incorporated into Odratrans S.A., thus liquidating the shipping company. The only preserved assets were those located in Bydgoszcz, which constituted a transport and forward base for its new owner.

In 2010, Odratrans S.A. was at the head of one of the largest fleet in the European Union (almost 1000 units).

== Present time (since 2010) ==
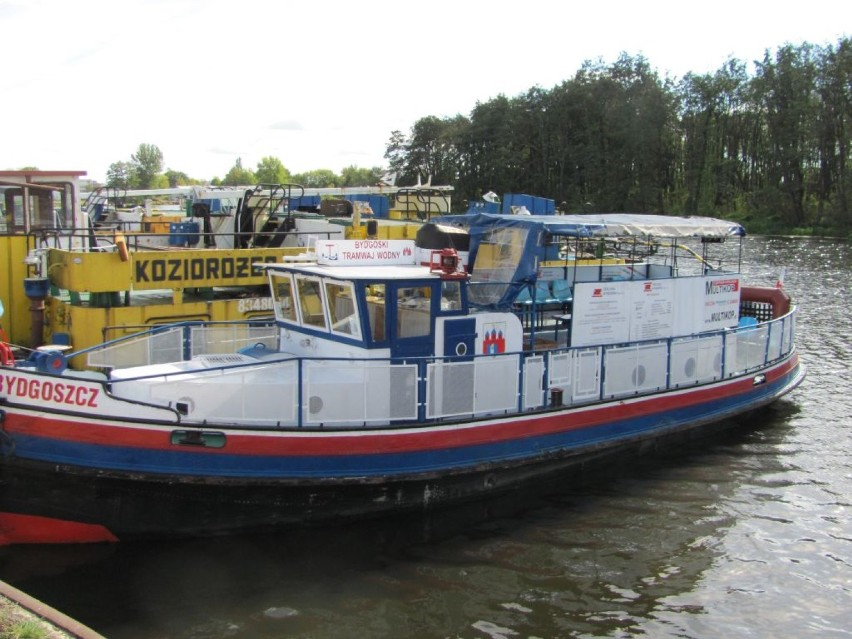
Żegluga Bydgoska's water tram at the harbour

Since 2010, Żegluga Bydgoska sp.z o.o. is the successor of "Żegluga Bydgoska - Odratrans S.A." acquired on August 12, 2009 by Odratrans S.A. In 2012, "Odratrans" has been renamed OT Logistics.

Żegluga Bydgoska Sp. z o.o. operates in the Vistula river and in the ports of Bydgoszcz and of the Tricity. It owns over 40 ships, comprising pontoon boats, barges and pushers. Company's main income is the transport of goods from the Vistula River into local markets in Bydgoszcz, Chełmno, Kwidzyn and Malbork (500,000 tons shipped in 2008).

It also provides transport and hydrotechnical services for oversized cargo on the Vistula river. Furthermore, the company provides the city of Bydgoszcz with services for the operation of the "Bydgosszcz Water Tram" (Polish: Bydgoski Tramwaj Wodny) along the Brda River.

== Gallery ==
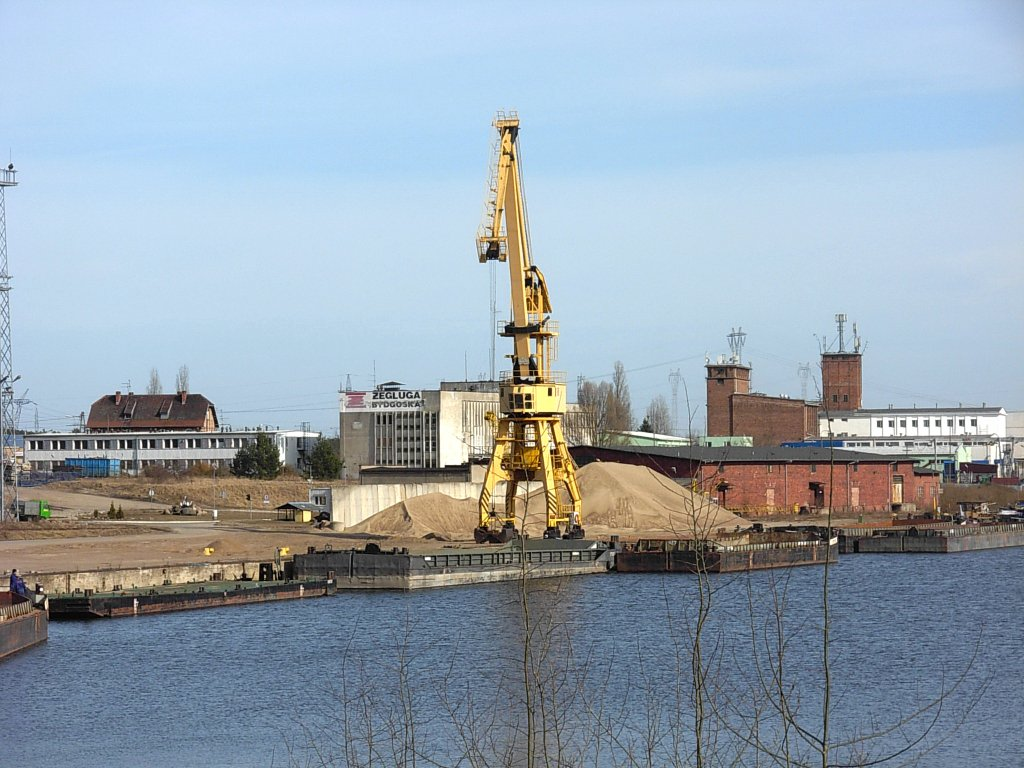
Żegluga Bydgoska's port on the Brda river

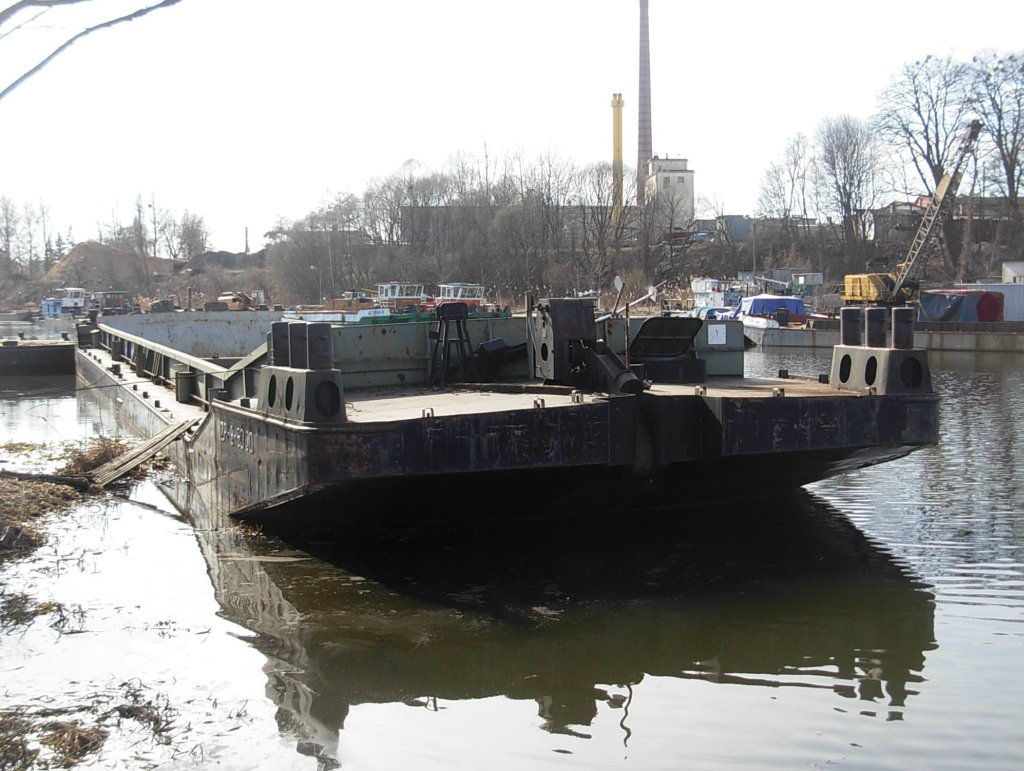
Barge of the company on the Brda

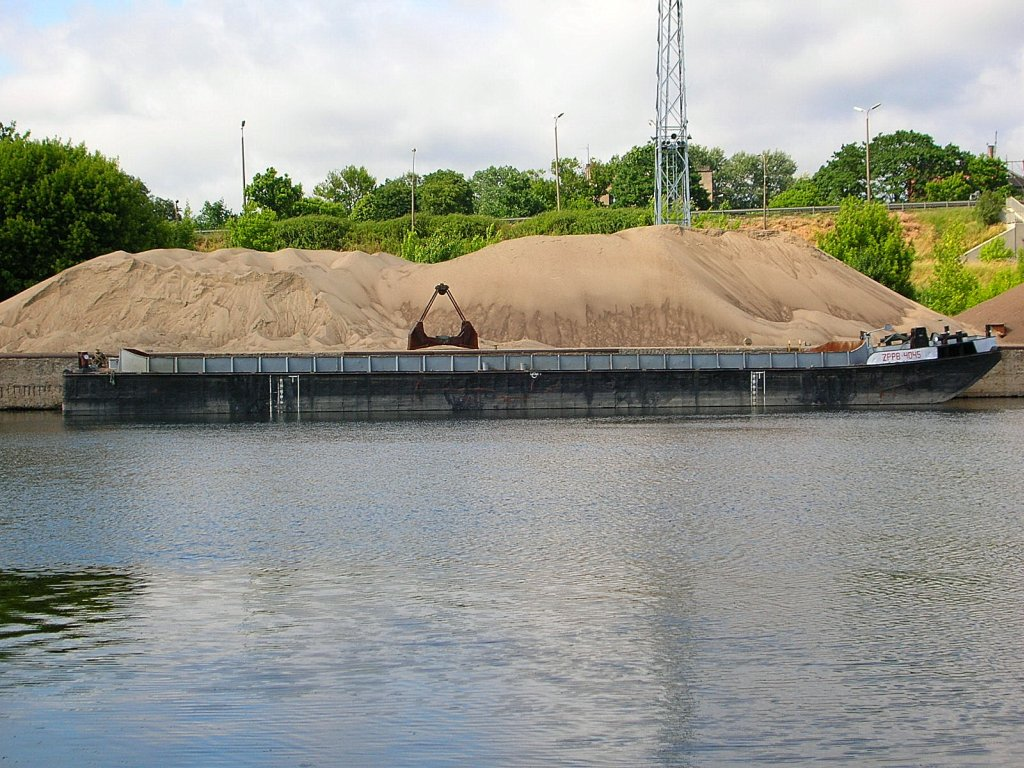
Shipping of sand

== See also ==
- Bydgoszcz

== Bibliography ==
- (in Polish) Brakowski, Konrad (1973). Wczoraj, dziś i jutro Żeglugi Bydgoskiej. Kalendarz Bydgoski. Bydgoszcz: Towarzystwo Miłośników Miasta Bydgoszczy. pp. 124–131.
- (in Polish) Brakowski, Konrad (2003). Płyń barko po rzekach i kanałach. Kalendarz Bydgoski. Bydgoszcz: Towarzystwo Miłośników Miasta Bydgoszczy. pp. 299–303.
- (in Polish) Szcząchor, Arleta (2004). Tradycje Żeglugi Bydgoskiej – Lloyd Bydgoski 1891-1945. Kronika Bydgoska XXV. Bydgoszcz: Towarzystwo Miłosnikow Miasta Bydgoszczy - Bydgoskie Towarzystwo Naukowe. pp. 76–103.
- (in Polish) Turowski, Stefan (1988). Żegluga śródlądowa w Bydgoszczy w latach 1945-1982. Kronika Bydgoska IX. Bydgoszcz: Towarzystwo Miłosnikow Miasta Bydgoszczy - Bydgoskie Towarzystwo Naukowe. pp. 127–146.
