= Stanisław Rolbieski =

Engineer, entrepreneur, Bydgoszcz, Poland, 19th-20th century

Stanisław Jan Rolbieski
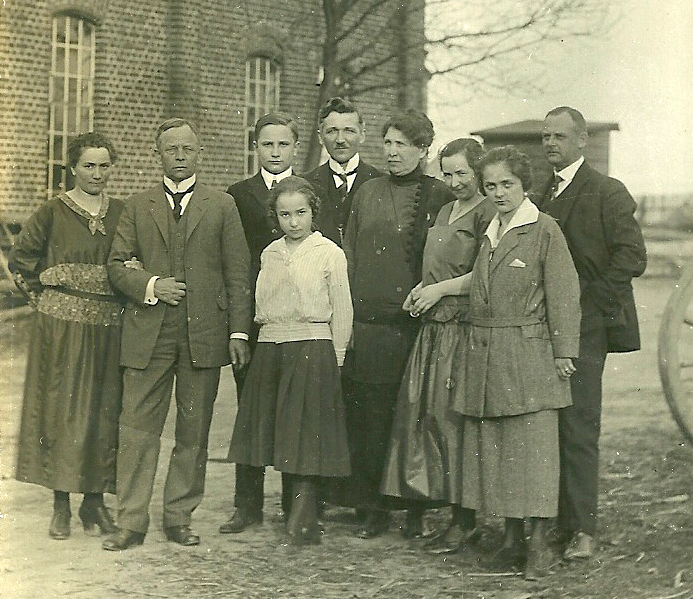
- Stanisław Rolbieski's family. Stanisław is the second from the left
- Born: 11 November 1873; Broniszewice, German Empire
- Died: 20 October 1939 (aged 65); Bydgoszcz, Poland
- Occupations: entrepreneur, engineer
- Years active: 1902–1939
- Known for: Factory Kabel
- Awards

Stanisław Jan Rolbieski (1873-1939) was a Polish engineer, entrepreneur, economic activist, city counselor in Bydgoszcz and founder of the Kabel Polski factory in Bydgoszcz.

== Biography ==
Stanisław was born on 11 November 1873 in Broniszewice, in the Pleszew county south-east of Poznań, then in the German Empire. His father was a civil servant, Piotr Aleksander "Rolbiecki": his name Rolbieski was distorted in the documents by the German authorities. His mother was Michalina née Lipkowski.

He studied at the realschule in Bydgoszcz, where in 1896, he passed his secondary education leaving examination. During his school years, he was harried for belonging to the "Sokół" Gymnastic Society.

After leaving the realschule, Rolbieski studied from 1896 to 1901 at the polytechnic of Charlottenburg then outside of Berlin. During this period he started working at the Reparaturbetrieb der östlichen Eisenbahn (English: Eastern Railway repair shop - today's PESA Bydgoszcz) and then for six months in a factory in the German Empire. In 1901, he graduated from the polytechnic with an Engineer diploma.

Afterwards, Stanisław moved to Berlin to first work in an electrotechnical factory of the AEG company before changing to the Deutsche Kabelwerke Aktiengesellschaft (A.G.). In this position, he carried out assembly work abroad: Spain, Norway, England, Russian Empire, Belgium and Kingdom of the Netherlands. In 1913, he directed the building of a branch factory in London. In the last years before the outbreak of World War I, he was the technical director of "Deutsche Kabelwerke A.G.".

After the conflict and despite favorable working offers in Berlin, Rolbieski returned to Bydgoszcz in April 1919: he lived in the tenement at 96 Gdańska Street.

He was decided to organize the booming economic life in the reborn Second Polish Republic. Arriving in the area while the Greater Poland uprising was raging, the locally ruling Supreme People's Council of the Netze District handed him over the management of the trade and industry sector. Hence he was in charge of the takeover of the Bydgoszcz industry from German hands.

From January 1920, he participated in the reorganization of city life, initially as a justice of the peace. Later, he was supervising matters dealing with power plant, tram, railways, water and port. In December 1921, Stanisław was elected as an honorary city councilor of Bydgoszcz, position he kept till his resignation in 1924. From 1920 to 1923 he was the deputy state commissioner in Bydgoszcz, in charge of the local Chamber of Industry and Commerce (Polish: Izba Przemysłowo-Handlowa) then located at 10 Nowy Rynek.

Acting for the Polish industry of Bydgoszcz, he initiated the purchase of large German enterprises by the city, such as the shipping company "Bromberger Schleppschiffahrt" (renamed Żegluga Bydgoska). He encouraged the development of industry, especially in areas not yet present in Poland. He devoted a lot of effort to occupational hygiene and living conditions of employees.

Stanisław participated financially in many social, charity and cultural actions. From 1923 onwards, he was a member of the Society of Friends of the Cadet School in Bydgoszcz and in 1928 he became its president (later an honorary member).

He was as well active in the "Union for the Defense of Western Borderlands" (Polish: Związek Obrony Kresów Zachodnich). From 1927 to 1934, he was the Honorary Consul of Sweden in Bydgoszcz.

Following the outset of World War II and the German invasion of the city, Rolbieski did not evacuate, feeling responsible for the fate of the employees and the property of the companies he was leading. The Nazi authorities accused him of dismantling and evacuating the "Bydgoska Fabryka Kabli" and blowing up the factory dam and the bridge over the Brda River (actions which were carried out by the retreating polish troops).

On 20 October 1939, together with his wife and son, he was arrested and executed the same day in the northern wooden district of "Las Gdański", at the Parish Cemetery of St. Vincent de Paul's church (today at 56 Stefana Wyszyńskiego street).

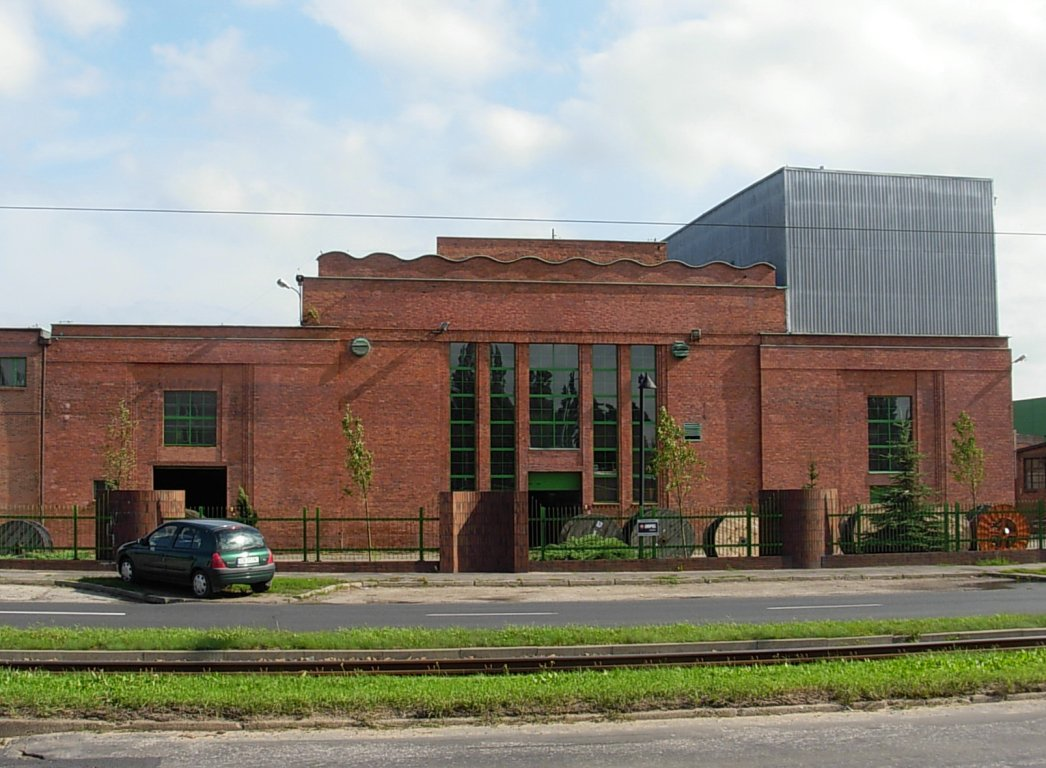
Historic cable factory building in Bydgoszcz

== Entrepreneurship ==
=== Bydgoska Fabryka Kabli ===
Stanisław Rolbieski, with the backing of banks from Greater Poland, launched the project to build the first Polish cable factory. Eventually, his initiative ended up with the creation, on 21 September 1920, of the Bydgoszcz Cable Factory of which he became the first director (1920–1923).

In this position, he supervised the construction of the production site in Bydgoszcz, which was completed in 1922. The company still operates today as a subsidiary of "Tele-Fonika Kable".

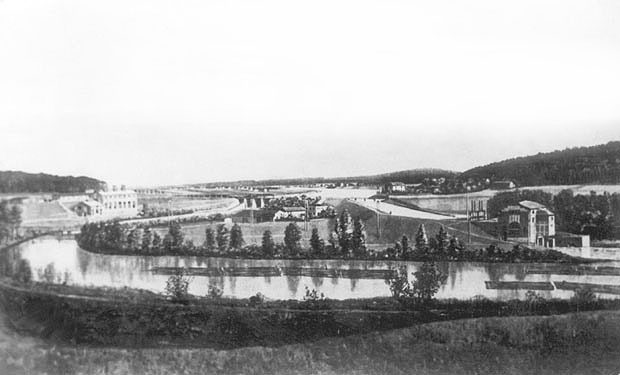
Smukała complex in 1905

=== Karbid ===
In 1920, Rolbieski became the manager of the "Fabryka Karbidu w Smukała" near Bydgoszcz, a branch of the company "Brandenbürgische Carbidwerke" producing calcium carbide.

In 1922, he had the factory bought by a bespoke joint-stock company established for the occasion, called the "Karbid Wielkopolski", in which the city of Bydgoszcz was a major shareholder. As the director of "Karbid", he modernized and expanded the initial German factory. He took care of the management of the wastelands produced by "Karbid" into the Brda river. As such, with the participation of specialists from the Institutes of Agriculture of Bydgoszcz, he organized the restocking of the Brda river.

In parallel, he initiated the establishment of the cooperating enterprise "Stomil Bydgoszcz" producing rubber items. Still active nowadays, it is located at 155 Toruńska Street in Bydgoszcz.

== Family ==
In 1906, Stanisław Rolbieski married Emilia, the daughter of Aleksander Wilk-Czarnowski, a doctor from Opole.

They had a son, Roman Aleksander (1908–1939) and a daughter Stella Maria (1911-1997).

- Roman was a municipal judge in Inowrocław.
- Stella Maria graduated from high school in Bydgoszcz in 1928. In 1931 she married Zbigniew Szacherski, an officer serving at the 7th Greater Poland Rifle Regiment in Poznań. During World War II, Zbigniew fought with his unit and was seriously wounded in September 1939 and remained invalid after months of treatment. It did not prevent him to join the Home Army (Polish: Armia Krajowa, AK) at the end of 1943. After the liberation of Warsaw, he became the director of the Polish Army Museum in Warsaw. Stella Maria was also a soldier of the Home Army, serving as a liaison for the AK's Headquarters. In 1949, she graduated in history from the University of Warsaw and worked at the Central Archives of Historical Records and from 1953 at the Institute of History. In 1960, she passed her Doctor degree dealing with "The Cistercian abbey in Szpetal and the Prussian mission" (Polish: Opactwo cysterskie w Szpetalu a misja pruska). She was specialized with the history of the Płock region.
- Stanisław's younger sister, Wanda Jadwiga (1876-1952) was a Polish teacher, organizer and director of the first female municipal gymnasium in Bydgoszcz in 1920. She was awarded with the Golden Cross of Merit.

== Orders and commemorations ==
- Stanisław Rolbieski received the Knight's Cross of the Order of Polonia Restituta on 9 November 1931.
- He was also awarded with the Gold Cross of Merit.
- In 2012, his name was given to one of the streets in the Bydgoszcz Industrial and Technological Park.

== See also ==
- Bydgoszcz
- Bydgoska Fabryka Kabli

== Bibliography ==
- (in Polish) Błażejewski Stanisław, Kutta Janusz, Romaniuk Marek (1995). Bydgoski Słownik Biograficzny. Tom I. Bydgoszcz: Kujawsko-Pomorskie Towarzystwo Kulturalne Wojewódzki Ośrodek Kultury. pp. 93–94.
- (in Polish) Polski Słownik Biograficzny. T.XXXI. Wrszawa: Polska Akademia Nauk. 1989.
