= Broniszewice =

- Village
- Location within Poland
- Coordinates: 51°57′N 17°49′E
- Country: Poland
- Voivodeship: Greater Poland
- County: Pleszew
- Gmina: Czermin

Broniszewice [brɔniʂɛˈvit͡sɛ] (1939-1945 Marienbronn) is a village in the administrative district of Gmina Czermin, within Pleszew County, Greater Poland Voivodeship, in west-central Poland.
