= Walter Ernst =

German lawyer and Nazi politician (1899–1945)

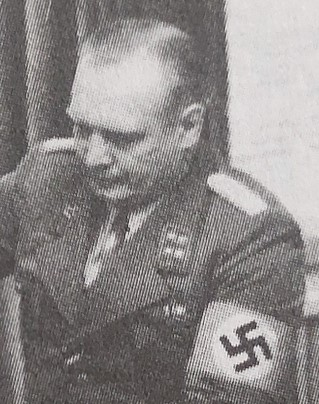
- Walther Ernst in 1943

Gauleiter of Halle-Merseburg
- In office 27 June 1925 – 25 July 1926
- Appointed by: Adolf Hitler
- Preceded by: Position established
- Succeeded by: Paul Hinkler

Bürgermeister of Schneidemühl
- In office 1939 – June 1942

Bürgermeister of Bromberg
- In office June 1942 – January 1945

Personal details
- Born: 6 April 1899 Quedlinburg, Province of Saxony, Kingdom of Prussia, German Empire
- Died: March 1945 (aged 45) Pelplin, Nazi Germany
- Cause of death: Killed in action
- Party: Nazi Party
- Education: University of Halle
- Profession: Lawyer

Walter Ernst (6 April 1899 – March 1945) was a German lawyer and early member of the Nazi Party who became the Gauleiter of Gau Halle-Merseburg and, later, the Bürgermeister of Schneidemühl and Bromberg. Fleeing from his city before the Red Army assault, he was condemned for cowardice, assigned to a penal battalion and died in action in the final months before Germany's surrender.

== Early Nazi career ==
Not much is known about Ernst's early life. In February 1925, the Nazi Party was reestablished after having been outlawed as a result of Adolf Hitler's failed Beer Hall Putsch. Ernst joined the Party early after its formation and received membership number 4,476.

At the time, the Party leadership in the area around Halle and Merseburg was largely unorganized. The Ortsgruppe (local group) in the city of Halle, under its chairman Großclaus, reported directly to the central Party leadership in Munich. Walter Ernst was able to persuade other, smaller Party groups in the region to coalesce around him. With the support of the Sturmabteilung (SA) leader in Halle, Wolf-Heinrich Graf von Helldorff, Ernst was able to consolidate his position, and the two succeeded in excluding Großclaus from the Party leadership.

Ernst was elected Nazi State Association Leader (Landesverbandes-Fuhrer) for the newly-formed Gau Halle-Merseburg on 27 June 1925. He thus became, effectively, the first Gauleiter of the region. Also in 1925, Ernst founded a newspaper, the Mitteldeutscher Beobachter, to support the Party’s position on issues.

Still, the Gau remained factionalized and, on 25 July 1926, Ernst himself lost his leadership position and was expelled from the Party by decision of the Halle Ortsgruppe on 30 July. His successor as Gauleiter was Paul Hinkler.

== Later career and death ==
From October 1927 to November 1931, Ernst studied law at the University of Halle. He worked as a law clerk and reenrolled in the Nazi Party in 1932. He also joined the SA, and held the rank of SA-Sturmführer. Ernst passed his second state law examination in 1935. From 1936 to 1939, he was City Syndic (city counsel) in Quedlinburg. Then in 1939, he became Bürgermeister (mayor) of Schneidemühl (today, Piła). He remained in that position until June 1942, and then became Bürgermeister for Bromberg (today, Bydgoszcz).

As the Red Army approached his city, Ernst resisted the order that civilians should defend it to the last man. Judging further resistance pointless, he abandoned the city without a fight before its fall on 27 January 1945. He fled to Danzig where he was arrested, incarcerated at the Danzig-Matzkau prison camp and condemned to death for cowardice, together with the Bromberg Police President, von Salisch, and the Regierungspräsident (regional president) of the Bromberg district, Walther Kühn. On orders of Heinrich Himmler, then in charge of the area's defense as Commander-in-Chief of Army Group Vistula, von Salisch was executed immediately, while Ernst and Kühn were placed in a penal battalion and ordered to undertake especially dangerous missions. Though Kühn survived the war, Ernst was killed in action in defense of the greater Danzig area sometime in March 1945.

== Sources ==
- Höffkes, Karl (1986). Hitlers Politische Generale. Die Gauleiter des Dritten Reiches: ein biographisches Nachschlagewerk. Tübingen: Grabert-Verlag. ISBN 3-87847-163-7.
- Miller, Michael D.; Schulz, Andreas (2012). Gauleiter: The Regional Leaders of the Nazi Party and Their Deputies, 1925-1945. Vol. I (Herbert Albrecht - H. Wilhelm Hüttmann). R. James Bender Publishing. ISBN 978-1-932970-21-0.
