= Draw bench =

A draw bench is a machine used to do cold work on a metal, such as changing the shape of the metal without applying heat and applying only pressure.

== Wire drawind by hand ==
The process can be done by hand with a drawplate and draw tongs. Beeswax or oil is used as a lubricant.

== Machine construction ==
It consists of a chain drive, driven by a motor and a set of gears. The other end of the machine consists of a die mounted on a thick steel plate. The workpiece is inserted through the die and clamped on a trolley which then is hooked onto the chain for pulling across.

== Die ==
The die is usually made of tungsten carbide with a steel housing. The die can be made to any desired shape (round, square, rectangular, triangular, half round, L-shaped, oval etc.).
