= Mayor of Bydgoszcz =

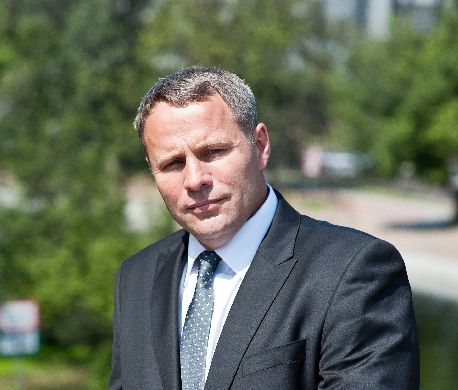
Current President of Bydgoszcz Rafał Bruski.

The mayor of Bydgoszcz (Polish: prezydent miasta Bydgoszczy) is the head of the executive of Bydgoszcz.

== Until 1920 ==
title: Nadburmistrz (German: Oberbürgmeister)
Name	Took office	Left office
Boie	1875	1879
Bachmann	1879	1891
Bräsicke (d. 1898)	1891	1898
Alfred Knobloch	23 February 1899	30 December 1909
Paul Mitzlaff; Chairman of City Council also	14 June 1910	23 September 1919
Hugo Wolff	23 September 1919	19 January 1920

== Second Polish Republic (1918–1939) ==
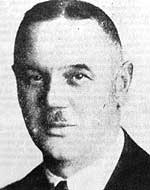
Jan Maciaszek – first Polish president

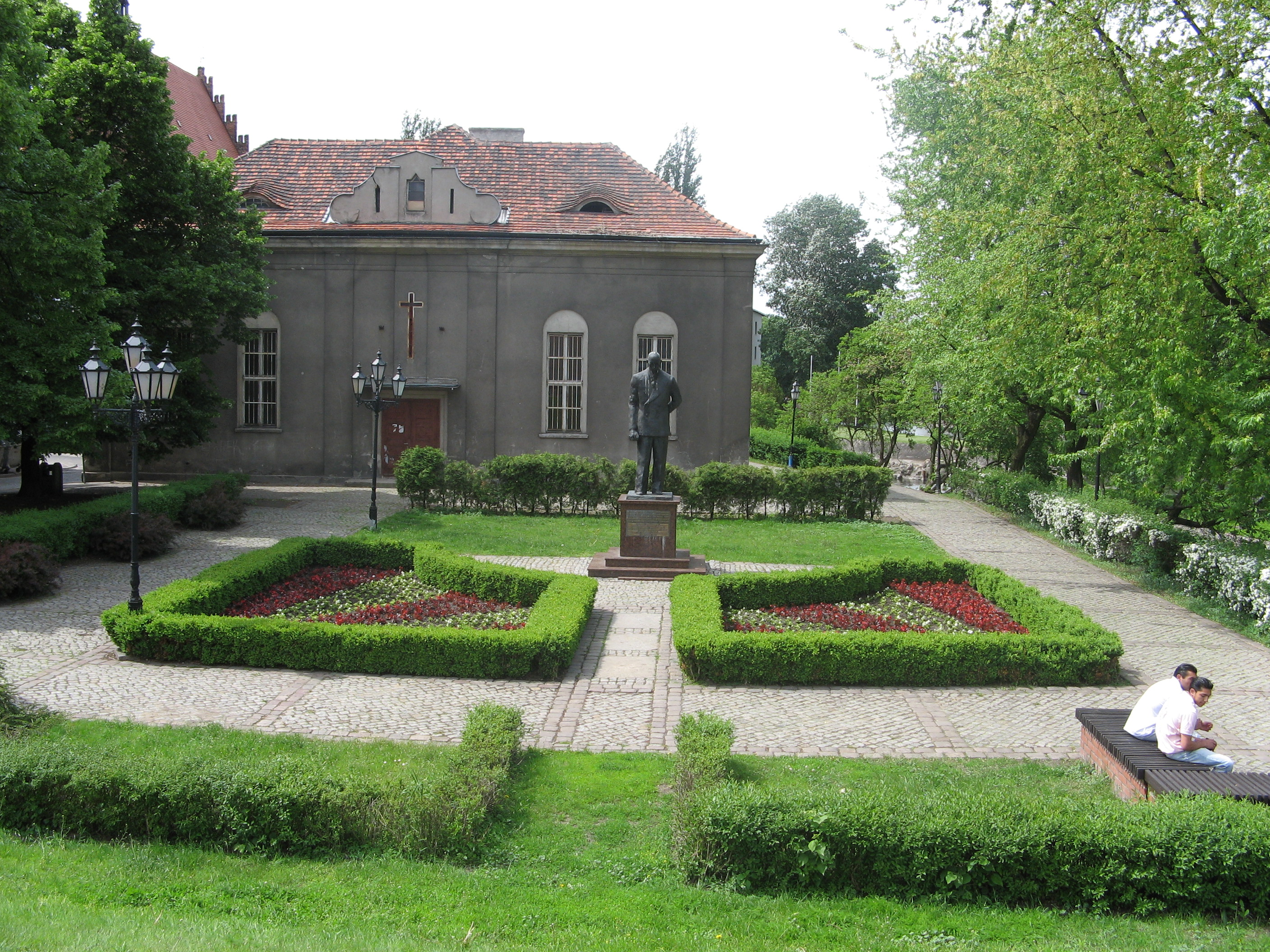
Leon Barciszewski Monument

title: Prezydent
Name	Took office	Left office
Jan Maciaszek; General Commissioner on Bydgoszcz (by Ministry of former Prussia province) (3 May 1876 – 10 January 1932)	14 January 1920	10 March 1920
Jan Maciaszek; Commissioner President (3 May 1876 – 10 January 1932)	11 March 1920	4 July 1921
Tadeusz Chmielarski; Vice-president, Acting president	5 July 1921	4 September 1921
Wincenty Łukowski; Commissioner President	5 September 1921	5 January 1922
Bernard Śliwiński (5 July 1883 – 18 December 1941)	4 May 1922	30 November 1930
Tadeusz Chmielarski; Vice-president, Acting president	1 December 1930	22 September 1932
Leon Barciszewski (10 May 1883 – 11 November 1939)	23 September 1932	3 September 1939

== General Government (1939–1944) ==
Name	Took office	Left office
None – German Army	3 September 1939	26 September 1939
Werner Kampe; City Commissioner (German: Stadtkommissar)	27 September 1939	26 October 1939
Werner Kampe; Nadburmistrz and Chief of City NSDAP (German: kreisleiter)	?	18 February 1941
Erich Temp; Nadburmistrz	19 February 1941	June 1942
Walther Ernst; Burmistrz	June 1942	January 1945
Roman Borowski	1945	1945
Witold Szukaszta	1945	1945

== People's Republic of Poland (1945–1989) ==
title: Przewodniczący Prezydium Miejskiej Rady Narodowej Bydgoszczy; English: Head of the Municipal Branch of the National Council
Name	Took office	Left office
Józef Twardzicki	1 September 1945	6 September 1949
Kazimierz Maludziński	15 September 1949	9 July 1971
Franciszek Lech	9 July 1971	11 June 1973
Wincenty Domisz	11 June 1973	31 January 1982
Andrzej Barkowski	5 February 1982	21 August 1985
Władysław Przybylski	6 September 1985	30 April 1990

== Republic of Poland (since 1990) ==
title: Prezydent Bydgoszczy; English: President of Bydgoszcz
Name	Took office	Left office
Krzysztof Chamra	12 June 1990	30 January 1991
Edwin Warczak	1 February 1991	15 July 1994
Kosma Złotowski	15 July 1994	19 July 1995
Henryk Sapalski	25 October 1995	3 November 1998
Roman Jasiakiewicz	3 November 1998	20 November 2002
Konstanty Dombrowicz	20 November 2002	14 December 2010
Rafał Bruski	14 December 2010	

== See also ==
- Bydgoszcz
- Timeline of Bydgoszcz
- Lists of mayors by country
