= Haupttreuhandstelle Ost =

Nazi German predatory state institution

The Haupttreuhandstelle Ost (HTO), or the Main Trustee Office for the East, created by Hermann Göring, was a Nazi German predatory state institution responsible for liquidating Polish and Jewish businesses in occupied Poland and selling them to German "settlers" from the East, for a symbolic fee during World War II. It was staffed by "a veritable stampede" of officials from the Deutsche and Dresdner banks.

The trusteeship was established on 1 November 1939. It was headquartered in Berlin, in the Office of the Four Year Plan, and headed by Max Winkler. Branches were immediately set up in Danzig, Poznań, Ciechanów, Katowice and Kraków. Hans Frank, the leader of the General Government, was offended by the circumvention of his authority, and therefore established a rivaling trusteeship two weeks later, on 15 November. Göring did not make an issue of the matter, and jurisdiction was split between the incorporated territories and the General Government.
