= Walther Oberhaidacher =

Austrian Nazi Party politician

Police President of Dresden
- In office 27 March 1944 – 30 April 1945

Police President of Bochum
- In office 4 August 1938 – 27 March 1944

Gauleiter of Styria
- In office 25 November 1928 – 4 August 1934
- Preceded by: Ferdinand Krügler

Deputy Gauleiter of Styria
- In office 10 May 1928 – 24 November 1928
- Preceded by: Position established
- Succeeded by: Fritz Knaus

Additional positions
- 1929–1933: Graz City Counselor
- 1936–1945: Reichstag Deputy

Personal details
- Born: 22 September 1896 Bozen, County of Tyrol, Austria-Hungary
- Died: 30 April 1945 (aged 48) Dresden, Saxony, Nazi Germany
- Party: Nazi Party
- Other political affiliations: Deutsche Nationalsozialistische Arbeiterpartei, (DNSAP)
- Education: Graz University of Technology
- Occupation: Mechanical engineer
- Civilian awards: Golden Party Badge

Military service
- Allegiance: Austria-Hungary; Nazi Germany
- Branch/service: Austro-Hungarian Army; Schutzstaffel
- Years of service: 1915-1918; 1938-1945
- Rank: Leutnant; Brigadeführer
- Unit: 2nd Kaiserjäger Regiment; 4th Kaiserjäger Regiment
- Battles/wars: World War I
- Military awards: War Merit Cross, 1st and 2nd class with Swords; Sudetenland Medal

Walther Philipp Anton Oberhaidacher (22 September 1896 – 30 April 1945) was an Austrian Nazi who was the Gauleiter of Styria and a Reichstag deputy in Nazi Germany. He was also an SS-Brigadeführer who served as the Police President in Bochum and Dresden.

== Early life ==
Oberhaidacher was born in Bozen (today, Bolzano), in the Tyrol region of Austria-Hungary. He attended Volksschule and Realschule there and obtained his Abitur in 1915. During the First World War, he enlisted as a one-year volunteer with the 2nd Kaiserjäger Regiment of the Austro-Hungarian Army in April 1915. He subsequently was deployed with the 4th Kaiserjäger Regiment, and the infantry regiments 102 and 14. He saw action on the Italian front for twenty-seven months, including in the Battles of the Isonzo. Advancing to the ranks of Fähnrich (July 1915) and Leutnant (January 1917) of reserves, he served as a machine gun platoon commander. After the end of the war, he studied mechanical engineering at the Technical University in Graz. He sought employment and worked as a factory technician and, from 1926 to 1933, was the technical operations manager in a bed spring factory.

== Austrian political career ==
On 1 April 1924, Oberhaidacher joined the Austrian Nazi Party (Deutsche Nationalsozialistische Arbeiterpartei, DNSAP) in Austria and held the offices of business manager and treasurer of the Ortsgruppe (local group) in Graz. After the majority of the Austrian Nazis accepted the leadership of Adolf Hitler, Oberhaidacher joined the Nazi Party on 10 September 1926 (membership number 50,478). As an early Party member, he would later be awarded the Golden Party Badge. From January to April 1928, he was the propaganda leader in Graz and, from 10 May 1928, Deputy Gauleiter and propaganda leader for Styria. On 25 November 1928, he advanced to the post of Gauleiter. He was also the editor of the Nazi newspaper Der Kampf (The Struggle). From 1929 to 1933, he was a city councilor in Graz.

Noted to possess good speaking and debating skills, Oberhaidacher was also considered by his superiors to have sound political judgement. During his tenure, Styria by 1930 had the largest per capita Party membership and the most solid finances of all the Austrian Gaue. Oberhaidacher was the Party's negotiator in 1933 and 1934 in talks with leaders of the Styrian Homeland Security (Steirischer Heimatschutz) that resulted in that organization being integrated into the Nazi Party. He was arrested by Austrian authorities on two occasions in early 1933. Following increased incidents of Nazi-sponsored violence, Austrian Chancellor Engelbert Dollfuß outlawed the Party on 19 June 1933, and Oberhaidacher fled across the German border and settled in Munich. After the failed Nazi-organized July Putsch against the Dollfuß government in 1934, the Party in Austria was driven further underground, and its Gau organizations were effectively dismantled.

== Career in Nazi Germany ==
Oberhaidacher left his Gauleiter position on 4 August 1934. At the 29 March 1936 parliamentary election, he was elected as a Reichstag deputy for electoral constituency 30, Chemnitz-Zwickau, a seat he would retain until his death. In mid-January 1938, he reported to the police administration in Düsseldorf for training. On 30 January 1938, he joined the Schutzstaffel (SS number 291,207) with the rank of SS-Oberführer and was later assigned to the Reich Security Main Office (RSHA). On 9 November 1938, he was promoted to SS-Brigadeführer. On 4 August 1938, he was made the Acting Police President of Bochum, an appointment that was made permanent on 19 September 1939. He was appointed to a five-year term as an honorary judge of the People's Court on 5 January 1939. On 21 November 1939, he was awarded the Sudetenland Medal and, on 2 June 1942, he was awarded the War Merit Cross, 1st class with Swords.

Oberhaidacher was transferred to become the police chief of Dresden on 27 March 1944. From October 1944, he was the acting and, as of 1 February 1945, the permanent Ordnungspolizei commander at the headquarters of the Higher SS and Police Leader "Elbe" in Dresden. In 1944, he was also authorized to wear the uniform of a Generalmajor of police. He died in the closing days of the Second World War.

== Sources ==
- Biography of Walther Oberhaidacher in the Westphalian History Internet Portal
- Graf, Wolfgang (2012). Österreichische SS-Generäle: Himmlers verlässliche Vasallen. Klagenfurt/Ljubljana/Wien: Hermagoras-Verlag. ISBN 978-3-87847-163-9.
- Höffkes, Karl (1986). Hitlers Politische Generale. Die Gauleiter des Dritten Reiches: ein biographisches Nachschlagewerk. Tübingen: Grabert-Verlag. ISBN 3-87847-163-7.
- Pauley, Bruce F. (1981). Hitler and the Forgotten Nazis: A History of Austrian National Socialism. The University of North Carolina Press. ISBN 978-0-807-84182-2.
- Schiffer Publishing Ltd., ed. (2000). SS Officers List: SS-Standartenführer to SS-Oberstgruppenführer (As of 30 January 1942). Schiffer Military History Publishing. ISBN 0-7643-1061-5.
