= Walter Klaunig =

Early German Nazi Party official (1893 – unknown)

Gauleiter of Gau Brandenburg (later renamed Gau Potsdam)
- In office 5 November 1925 – June 1926
- Preceded by: Position established
- Succeeded by: Position abolished

Personal details
- Born: 1893 German Empire
- Died: Unknown
- Party: Nazi Party
- Other political affiliations: National Socialist Freedom Movement
- Education: Dipl.-Ing.
- Profession: Engineer, Salesman

Walter Klaunig (1893 – unknown) was a German engineer and an early official of the Nazi Party. He was the first Gauleiter of Gau Brandenburg, serving only about seven months before being dismissed. He was expelled from the Party in 1928 but readmitted in 1932. Little is documented about his subsequent life.

== Life ==
Not much is known of Klaunig's early life except that he was educated as an engineer and employed as a salesman. On 7 December 1924, he unsuccessfully stood for election to the Landtag of Prussia, seeking to represent the electoral constituency of Potsdam I as a member of the National Socialist Freedom Movement. This was a front organization set up during the time that the Nazi Party was banned in the wake of the unsuccessful Beer Hall Putsch. When the ban on the Party was lifted in 1925, Klaunig joined it (membership number 20,237).

On 5 November 1925, he was named the first Gauleiter for Gau Brandenburg with its capital in Potsdam. In February 1926, the designation was changed to Gau Potsdam. However by June 1926, Klaunig was removed as Gauleiter, though the reasons are unclear. No replacement was named and, in October 1926, Gau Potsdam was merged with Gau Groß-Berlin and the expanded new jurisdiction (now named Gau Berlin-Brandenburg) was assigned to Joseph Goebbels.

Klaunig was expelled from the Party sometime in 1928 for unclear reasons, though he was readmitted in 1932. After that, he fades from history and nothing is known of his later life or even the date of his death.

== Sources ==
- Longerich, Peter (2015). Goebbels: A Biography. Vintage. ISBN 978-0-099-52369-7.
- Miller, Michael D.; Schulz, Andreas (2017). Gauleiter: The Regional Leaders of the Nazi Party and Their Deputies, 1925–1945. Vol. 2 (Georg Joel – Dr. Bernhard Rust). R. James Bender Publishing. ISBN 978-1-932-97032-6.
