= Gau Main Franconia =

Administrative division of Nazi Germany

- Gau of Nazi Germany
- 1929–1945
- Flag Coat of arms

- Map of Nazi Germany showing its administrative subdivisions (Gaue and Reichsgaue).
- Capital: Würzburg
- Population
  - 17 May 1939: 844,732
- Government
- Gauleiter
  - 1929–1945: Otto Hellmuth
- History
  - Establishment: 1 March 1929
  - Disestablishment: 8 May 1945
Preceded by	Succeeded by
Bavaria	Bavaria
- Today part of: Germany

The Gau Main Franconia (German: Gau Mainfranken), formed as Gau Lower Franconia (German: Gau Unterfranken) on 1 March 1929 and renamed Gau Main Franconia on 30 July 1935, was an administrative division of Nazi Germany in Lower Franconia, Bavaria, from 1933 to 1945. Before that, from 1929 to 1933, it was the regional subdivision of the Nazi Party in that area.

== History ==
The Nazi Gau (plural Gaue) system was originally established in a party conference on 22 May 1926, in order to improve administration of the party structure. From 1933 onward, after the Nazi seizure of power, the Gaue increasingly replaced the German states as administrative subdivisions in Germany.

At the head of each Gau stood a Gauleiter, a position which became increasingly more powerful, especially after the outbreak of the Second World War, with little interference from above. Local Gauleiters often held government positions as well as party ones and were in charge of, among other things, propaganda and surveillance and, from September 1944 onward, the Volkssturm and the defense of the Gau.

The position of Gauleiter in Main Franconia was held by Otto Hellmuth for the duration of the existence of the Gau, with Ludwig Pösl (1931–37) and Wilhelm Kühnreich (1937–45) as his deputies.
