= Battle of Würzburg (1945) =

Battle in World War II

- Part of the Western Allied invasion of Germany
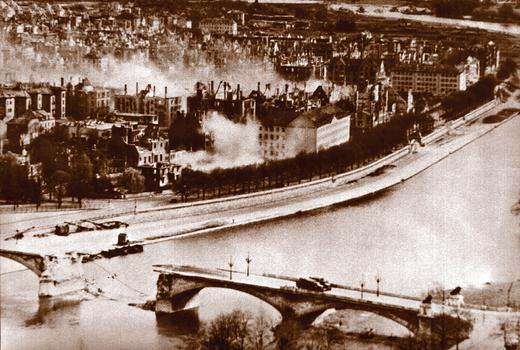
- The destroyed Ludwigsbrücke
Date	31 March — 6 April 1945
Location	Würzburg, Bavaria, Germany 49°47′36″N 9°55′46″E
Result	American victory

Combatants and Leaders
Germany	United States

Commanders and leaders
Richard Wolf	Harry J. Collins

Units involved
Unknown	42nd Infantry Division

Strength
est. 3,500	est. 5,000

Casualties and losses
est. 1,000 dead (including civilians)	est. 300 dead
- Location within Bavaria Battle of Würzburg (1945) (Germany) Battle of Würzburg (1945) (Europe)

The Battle of Würzburg (31 March—6 April 1945) which ended up with the capture Upper Franconia by 42nd Infantry Division ("Rainbow").

== Battle ==
The defense of Würzburg, under the leadership of Otto Hellmuth and military leadership of the Wehrmacht colonel Richard Wolf, represented the first serious resistance to the American division after crossing the Rhine due to Hitler's orders to put up fierce resistance. After Hettstadt to the northwest of Würzburg had fallen to American forces, the German forces were forced to fall back to the right bank of the Main River since reinforcements did not arrive as they were expecting.

US artillery pieces took positions on the heights of Nikolausberg and Katzenberg in order to bombard the city, while German artillery took position on the right bank of the Main River in Keesberg. On Monday at around 11:30 a.m., the Ludwigsbrücke was blown up, at around 4:45 p.m. the Alte Mainbrücke was blown up, and at around 5:15 p.m. the Luitpoldbrücke (now Friedensbrücke) was also blown up. This made all three of Würzburg's Main bridges impassable for American troops.

On the night of Tuesday some GIs in the Ludwigsbrücke area crossed the Main River with some light boats, without any significant resistance, and on the following day the bridgehead was erected and expanded there. Though the troop movements eventually came under fire from snipers posted in houses by Wolf. Downstream (north) of the Old Main Bridge where one of the pioneers built a pontoon bridge on April 3 to transport light vehicles and infantry to the right bank of the Main River.

The heaviest urban warfare took place on Wednesday and Thursday in the city center, which was in ruins due to Allied bombing raids over Würzburg. An attempted German counter-attack in the direction of the three main bridges failed due to the lack of armament and Würzburg fell to American forces.

On Friday, 6 April 1945, the last German units fighting in the outer districts fell and resistance ceased, marking the end of the battle.

== Literature ==
1. Kunze, Karl (1995). Kriegsende in Franken und der Kampf um Nürnberg im April 1945. Nuremberg.
2. Wagner, Ulrich. Die Eroberung Würzburgs im April 1945. Stuttgart. p. 294. ISBN 978-3-8062-1478-9.
