= Nazi Party =

Far-right political party in Germany (1920–1945)

National Socialist German Workers' Party Nationalsozialistische Deutsche Arbeiterpartei
- Abbreviation: NSDAP
- Chairman: Anton Drexler (24 February 1920 – 29 July 1921)
- Führer: Adolf Hitler (29 July 1921 – 30 April 1945)
- Party Minister: Martin Bormann (30 April 1945 – 2 May 1945)
- Founded: 24 February 1920; 106 years ago
- Banned: 10 October 1945; 81 years ago
- Preceded by: German Workers' Party
- Headquarters: Brown House, Munich, Germany
- Newspaper: Völkischer Beobachter
- Youth wing: Hitler Youth
- Armed wing: Sturmabteilung; Schutzstaffel
- Labour wing: German Labour Front
- Membership: Fewer than 60 (1920); 8.5 million (1945)
- Ideology: Nazism
- Political position: Far-right
- National affiliation: National Socialist Freedom Movement (1924): Anti-Young Plan campaign (1929) (Note: Officially called the "Reich Committee for the German People's Initiative against the Young Plan and the War Guilt Lie" (Reichsausschuß für die Deutsche Volksinitiative gegen den Young-Plan und die Kriegsschuldlüge)); Harzburg Front (1931)
- Colours: Black White Red (official, German Imperial colours); Brown (customary)
- Slogan: Deutschland erwache! ('Germany, awaken!') (unofficial)
- Anthem: "Horst-Wessel-Lied"

Party flag

The Nazi Party, (Note: English: /ˈnɑːtsi, ˈnætsi/ NA(H)T-see) officially the National Socialist German Workers' Party (German: Nationalsozialistische Deutsche Arbeiterpartei (Note: Pronounced [natsi̯oˈnaːlzotsi̯aˌlɪstɪʃə ˈdɔʏtʃə ˈʔaʁbaɪtɐpaʁˌtaɪ]) or NSDAP), was a far-right political party in Germany active between 1920 and 1945 that created and supported the ideology of Nazism. Its precursor, the German Workers' Party (Deutsche Arbeiterpartei; DAP), existed from 1919 to 1920. The Nazi Party emerged from the extremist German nationalist ("Völkisch nationalist"), racist, and populist Freikorps paramilitary culture, which fought against communist uprisings in post–World War I Germany. The party was created to draw workers away from communism and into völkisch nationalism. Hitler stated while on trial for his role in the Beer Hall Putsch in February 1924 that "I have resolved to be the destroyer of Marxism", a statement which he later applied to those opposed to the Nazi Party in 1926, claiming "They tried to paralyze the one party that would have been able to give opposition to this Red pest." Initially, Nazi political strategy used socialist rhetoric to gain the support of the lower middle class whilst maintaining other views; that was later downplayed to gain the support of business leaders. By the 1930s, the antisemitic and anti-Marxist themes of the party became even further emphasized. The party had little popular support until the Great Depression, when worsening living standards and widespread unemployment drove Germans into political extremism.

Central to Nazism were themes of racial segregation expressed in the idea of a "people's community" (Volksgemeinschaft). The party aimed to unite "racially desirable" Germans as national comrades while excluding those deemed to be either political dissidents, physically or intellectually inferior, or of a foreign race (Fremdvölkische). The Nazis sought to strengthen the Germanic people, the "Aryan master race", through racial purity and eugenics, broad social welfare programs, and a collective subordination of individual rights, which could be sacrificed for the good of the state on behalf of the people. To protect the supposed purity and strength of the Aryan race, the Nazis sought to disenfranchise, segregate, and eventually exterminate Jews, Slavs, Romani, the physically and mentally disabled, homosexuals, Jehovah's Witnesses, and political opponents. The persecution reached its climax when the party-controlled German state set in motion the Final Solution–an industrial system of genocide that carried out mass murders of around 6 million Jews and millions of other targeted victims in what has become known as the Holocaust.

Adolf Hitler, the party's leader since 1921, was appointed Chancellor of Germany by President Paul von Hindenburg on 30 January 1933, and quickly seized power afterwards. Hitler established a totalitarian regime known as the Third Reich and became dictator with absolute power. Following the military defeat of Germany in World War II, the party was declared illegal. The Allies attempted to purge German society of Nazi elements in a process known as denazification. Several top leaders were tried and found guilty of crimes against humanity in the Nuremberg trials, and executed. The use of symbols associated with the party is still outlawed in many European countries, including Germany and Austria.

== Name ==
The renaming of the German Workers' Party (DAP) to the National Socialist German Workers' Party (NSDAP) was partially driven by a desire to draw upon both left-wing and right-wing ideals, with "Socialist" and "Workers'" appealing to the left, and "National" and "German" appealing to the right. Nazi, the informal and originally derogatory term for a party member, abbreviates the party's name (Nationalsozialist [natsi̯oˈnaːlzotsi̯aˌlɪst]), and was coined in analogy with Sozi (pronounced [ˈzoːtsiː]), an abbreviation of Sozialdemokrat (member of the rival Social Democratic Party of Germany). (Note: or Sozialdemokrat (pronounced [zoˈtsi̯aːldemoˌkʁaːt], "social democrat")) Members of the party referred to themselves as Nationalsozialisten (National Socialists), but some did occasionally embrace the colloquial Nazi (such as Leopold von Mildenstein in his article series Ein Nazi fährt nach Palästina published in Der Angriff in 1934). The term Parteigenosse (party member) was commonly used among Nazis, with its corresponding feminine form Parteigenossin.

Concerning his party’s name, Hitler was interviewed in October 1923:

"Why," I asked Hitler, "do you call yourself a National Socialist, since your party program is the very antithesis of that commonly accredited to socialism?" "Socialism," he retorted, putting down his cup of tea, pugnaciously, "is the science of dealing with the common weal. Communism is not Socialism. Marxism is not Socialism. The Marxians have stolen the term and confused its meaning. I shall take Socialism away from the Socialists. Socialism is an ancient Aryan, Germanic institution […] We demand the fulfilment of the just claims of the productive classes by the state on the basis of race solidarity. To us state and race are one."

Regarding the use of the word ‘workers’ in the party name, Hitler was asked in 1934 “Inasmuch as you were forced by the Weimar Constitution to organize along party lines, you called your movement the National Socialist Workers' Party. In my opinion, you are thus giving the concept of the worker priority over the concept of the bourgeoisie.”, Hitler responded:

I chose the word "worker" because it was more natural and corresponded with every element of my being, and because I wanted to recapture this word for the national force. I did not and will not allow the concept of the worker to simply take on an international connotation and become an object of distrust to the bourgeoisie. In a certain sense, I had to "naturalize" the term worker and subject it once again to the control of the German language and the sovereign rights and obligations of the German Volk. Similarly, I will not tolerate that the correctly used and essentially understood concept of the "Bürger" [bourgeoisie] is spoiled. But I believe the "Bürger" is called upon to ensure this.

Before the rise of the party, "Nazi" had been used as a colloquial and derogatory word for a backward peasant, or an awkward and clumsy person. It derived from Ignaz, a shortened version of Ignatius, which was a common name in the Nazis' home region of Bavaria. Opponents seized on this, and the long-existing Sozi, to attach a dismissive nickname to the National Socialists.

In 1933, when Adolf Hitler assumed power in the German government, the usage of "Nazi" diminished in Germany, although Austrian anti-Nazis continued to use the term. The use of "Nazi Germany" and "Nazi regime" was popularised by anti-Nazis and German exiles abroad. Thereafter, the term spread into other languages and eventually was brought back to Germany after World War II. In English, the term is not considered slang and has such derivatives as Nazism and denazification.

== History ==
=== Origins and early years: 1918–1923 ===
The Nazi Party grew out of smaller political groups with a nationalist orientation that formed in the last years of World War I. In 1918, a league called the Freier Arbeiterausschuss für einen guten Frieden (Free Workers' Committee for a good Peace) was created in Bremen, Germany. On 7 March 1918, Anton Drexler, an avid German nationalist, formed a branch of this league in Munich. Drexler was a local locksmith who had been a member of the militarist Fatherland Party during World War I and was bitterly opposed to the armistice of November 1918 and the revolutionary upheavals that followed. Drexler followed the views of militant nationalists of the day, such as opposing the Treaty of Versailles, having antisemitic, anti-monarchist and anti-Marxist views, as well as believing in the superiority of Germans whom they claimed to be part of the Aryan "master race" (Herrenvolk). However, he also accused international capitalism of being a Jewish-dominated movement and denounced capitalists for war profiteering in World War I. Drexler saw the political violence and instability in Germany as the result of the Weimar Republic being out-of-touch with the masses, especially the lower classes. Drexler emphasised the need for a synthesis of völkisch nationalism with a form of economic socialism, in order to create a popular nationalist-oriented workers' movement that could challenge the rise of communism and internationalist politics. These were all well-known themes popular with various Weimar paramilitary groups such as the Freikorps.

Nazi Party badge emblem

Drexler's movement received attention and support from some influential figures. Supporter Dietrich Eckart, a well-to-do journalist, brought military figure Felix Graf von Bothmer, a prominent supporter of the concept of "national socialism", to address the movement. Later in 1918, Karl Harrer (a journalist and member of the Thule Society) convinced Drexler and several others to form the Politischer Arbeiter-Zirkel (Political Workers' Circle). The members met periodically for discussions with themes of nationalism and racism directed against Jewish people. In December 1918, Drexler decided that a new political party should be formed, based on the political principles that he endorsed, by combining his branch of the Workers' Committee for a good Peace with the Political Workers' Circle.

On 5 January 1919, Drexler created a new political party and proposed it should be named the "German Socialist Workers' Party", but Harrer objected to the term "socialist"; so the term was removed and the party was named the German Workers' Party (Deutsche Arbeiterpartei, DAP). To ease concerns among potential middle-class supporters, Drexler made clear that unlike Marxists the party supported the middle-class and that its socialist policy was meant to give social welfare to German citizens deemed part of the Aryan race. They became one of many völkisch movements that existed in Germany. Like other völkisch groups, the DAP advocated the belief that through profit-sharing instead of socialisation Germany should become a unified "people's community" (Volksgemeinschaft) rather than a society divided along class and party lines. This ideology was explicitly antisemitic. As early as 1920, the party was raising money by selling a tobacco called Anti-Semit.

From the outset, the DAP was opposed to non-nationalist political movements, especially on the left, including the Social Democratic Party of Germany (SPD) and the Communist Party of Germany (KPD). Members of the DAP saw themselves as fighting against "Bolshevism" and anyone considered a part of or aiding so-called "international Jewry". The DAP was also deeply opposed to the Treaty of Versailles. The DAP did not attempt to make itself public and meetings were kept in relative secrecy, with public speakers discussing what they thought of Germany's present state of affairs, or writing to like-minded societies in Northern Germany.

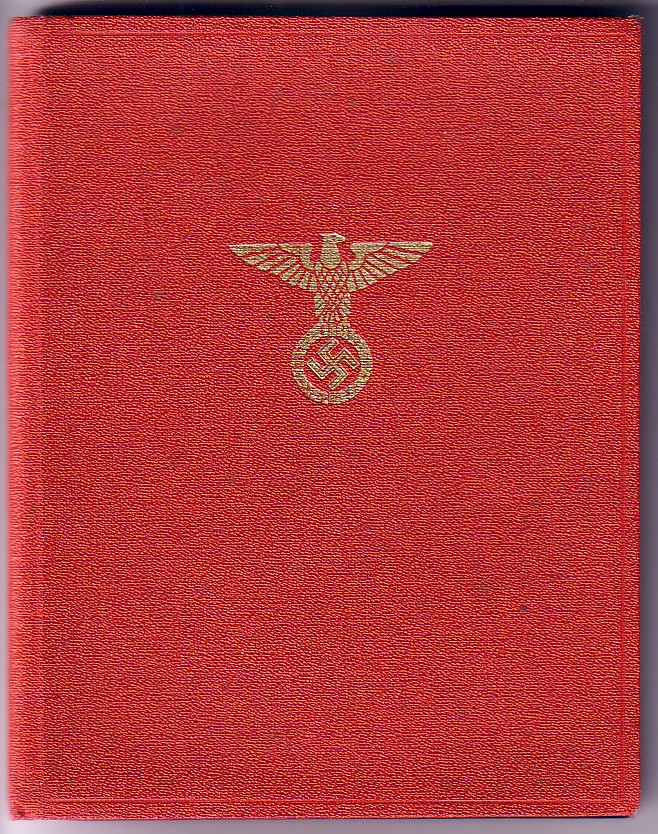
NSDAP membership book

The DAP was a comparatively small group with fewer than 60 members. Nevertheless, it attracted the attention of the German authorities, who were suspicious of any organisation that appeared to have subversive tendencies. In July 1919, while stationed in Munich, army Gefreiter Adolf Hitler was appointed a Verbindungsmann (intelligence agent) of an Aufklärungskommando (reconnaissance unit) of the Reichswehr (army) by Captain Mayr, the head of the Education and Propaganda Department (Dept Ib/P) in Bavaria. Hitler was assigned to influence other soldiers and to infiltrate the DAP. While Hitler was initially unimpressed by the meetings and found them disorganised, he enjoyed the discussion that took place. While attending a party meeting on 12 September 1919 at Munich's Sterneckerbräu, Hitler became involved in a heated argument with a visitor, Professor Baumann, who questioned the soundness of Gottfried Feder's arguments against capitalism; Baumann proposed that Bavaria should break away from Prussia and found a new South German nation with Austria. In vehemently attacking the man's arguments, Hitler made an impression on the other party members with his oratorical skills; according to Hitler, the "professor" left the hall acknowledging unequivocal defeat. Drexler encouraged him to join the DAP. On the orders of his army superiors, Hitler applied to join the party and within a week was accepted as party member 555 (the party began counting membership at 500 to give the impression they were a much larger party). Among the party's earlier members were Ernst Röhm of the Army's District Command VII; Dietrich Eckart, who has been called the spiritual father of National Socialism; then-Ludwig-Maximilians-Universität München student Rudolf Hess; Freikorps soldier Hans Frank; and Alfred Rosenberg, often credited as the 'philosopher' of the movement. All were later prominent in the Nazi regime.

Hitler later claimed to be the seventh party member. He was, in fact, the seventh executive member of the party's central committee and he would later wear the Golden Party Badge number one. Anton Drexler drafted a letter to Hitler in 1940—which was never sent—that contradicts Hitler's later claim:

No one knows better than you yourself, my Führer, that you were never the seventh member of the party, but at best the seventh member of the committee... And a few years ago I had to complain to a party office that your first proper membership card of the DAP, bearing the signatures of Schüssler and myself, was falsified, with the number 555 being erased and number 7 entered.

Although Hitler initially wanted to form his own party, he claimed to have been convinced to join the DAP because it was small and he could eventually become its leader. He consequently encouraged the organisation to become less of a debating society, which it had been previously, and more of an active political party. Normally, enlisted army personnel were not allowed to join political parties. In this case, Hitler had Captain Karl Mayr's permission to join the DAP. Further, Hitler was allowed to stay in the army and receive his weekly pay of 20 gold marks a week. Unlike many other members of the organisation, this continued employment provided him with enough money to dedicate himself more fully to the DAP.

Hitler's first DAP speech was held in the Hofbräukeller on 16 October 1919. He was the second speaker of the evening, and spoke to 111 people. Hitler later declared that this was when he realised he could really "make a good speech". At first, Hitler spoke only to relatively small groups, but his considerable oratory and propaganda skills were appreciated by the party leadership. With the support of Anton Drexler, Hitler became chief of propaganda for the party in early 1920. Hitler began to make the party more public, and organised its biggest meeting yet of 2,000 people on 24 February 1920 in the Staatliches Hofbräuhaus in München. Such was the significance of this particular move in publicity that Karl Harrer resigned from the party in disagreement. It was in this speech that Hitler enunciated the twenty-five points of the German Workers' Party manifesto that had been drawn up by Drexler, Feder and himself. Through these points he gave the organisation a much bolder stratagem with a clear foreign policy (abrogation of the Treaty of Versailles, a Greater Germany, Eastern expansion and exclusion of Jews from citizenship) and among his specific points were: confiscation of war profits, abolition of unearned incomes, the State to share profits of land and land for national needs to be taken away without compensation. In general, the manifesto was antisemitic, anti-capitalist, anti-democratic, anti-Marxist and anti-liberal. To increase its appeal to larger segments of the population, on the same day as Hitler's Hofbräuhaus speech on 24 February 1920, the DAP changed its name to the Nationalsozialistische Deutsche Arbeiterpartei ("National Socialist German Workers' Party", or Nazi Party). (Note: Some sources say the name change happened on 1 April 1920.) The name was intended to draw upon both left-wing and right-wing ideals, with "Socialist" and "Workers'" appealing to the left, and "National" and "German" appealing to the right. The word "Socialist" was added by the party's executive committee (at the suggestion of Rudolf Jung), over Hitler's initial objections, (Note: Hitler's original name suggested was the Social Revolutionary Party (German: Sozialrevolutionäre Partei).) in order to help appeal to left-wing workers.

In 1920, the Nazi Party officially announced that only persons of "pure Aryan descent [rein arischer Abkunft]" could become party members and if the person had a spouse, the spouse also had to be a "racially pure" Aryan. Party members could not be related either directly or indirectly to a so-called "non-Aryan". Even before it had become legally forbidden by the Nuremberg Laws in 1935, the Nazis banned sexual relations and marriages between party members and Jews. Party members found guilty of Rassenschande ("racial defilement") were persecuted heavily. Some members were even sentenced to death.

Hitler quickly became the party's most active orator, appearing in public as a speaker 31 times within the first year after his self-discovery. Crowds began to flock to hear his speeches. Hitler always spoke about the same subjects: the Treaty of Versailles and the Jewish question. This deliberate technique and effective publicising of the party contributed significantly to his early success, about which a contemporary poster wrote: "Since Herr Hitler is a brilliant speaker, we can hold out the prospect of an extremely exciting evening". Over the following months, the party continued to attract new members, while remaining too small to have any real significance in German politics. By the end of the year, party membership was recorded at 2,000, many of whom Hitler and Röhm had brought into the party personally, or for whom Hitler's oratory had been their reason for joining.

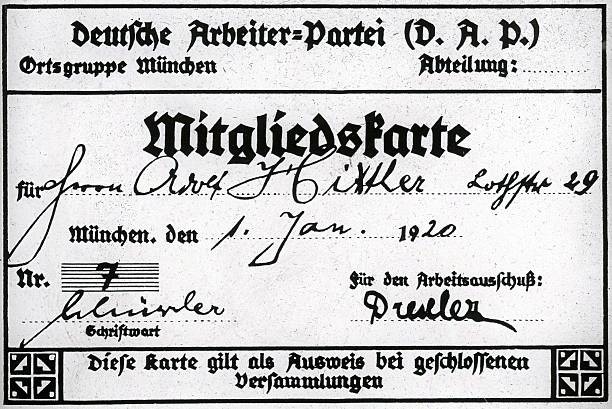
Hitler's membership card in the DAP (later NSDAP). The membership number (7) was altered from the original.

Hitler's talent as an orator and his ability to draw new members, combined with his characteristic ruthlessness, soon made him the dominant figure. However, while Hitler and Eckart were on a fundraising trip to Berlin in June 1921, a mutiny broke out within the party in Munich. Members of its executive committee wanted to merge with the rival German Socialist Party (DSP). Upon returning to Munich on 11 July, Hitler angrily tendered his resignation. The committee members realised that his resignation would mean the end of the party. Hitler announced he would rejoin on condition that he would replace Drexler as party chairman, and that the party headquarters would remain in Munich. The committee agreed, and he rejoined the party on 26 July as member 3,680. Hitler continued to face some opposition within the NSDAP, as his opponents had Hermann Esser expelled from the party and they printed 3,000 copies of a pamphlet attacking Hitler as a traitor to the party. In the following days, Hitler spoke to several packed houses and defended himself and Esser to thunderous applause.

Hitler's strategy proved successful; at a special party congress on 29 July 1921, he replaced Drexler as party chairman by a vote of 533 to 1. The committee was dissolved, and Hitler was granted nearly absolute powers in the party as its sole leader. He would hold the post for the remainder of his life. Hitler soon acquired the title Führer ("leader") and after a series of sharp internal conflicts it was accepted that the party would be governed by the Führerprinzip ("leader principle"). Under this principle, the party was a highly centralised entity that functioned strictly from the top down, with Hitler at the apex. Hitler saw the party as a revolutionary organisation, whose aim was the overthrow of the Weimar Republic, which he saw as controlled by the socialists, Jews and the "November criminals", a term invented to describe alleged elements of society who had 'betrayed the German soldiers' in 1918. The SA ("storm troopers", also known as "Brownshirts") were founded as a party militia in 1921 and began violent attacks on other parties.

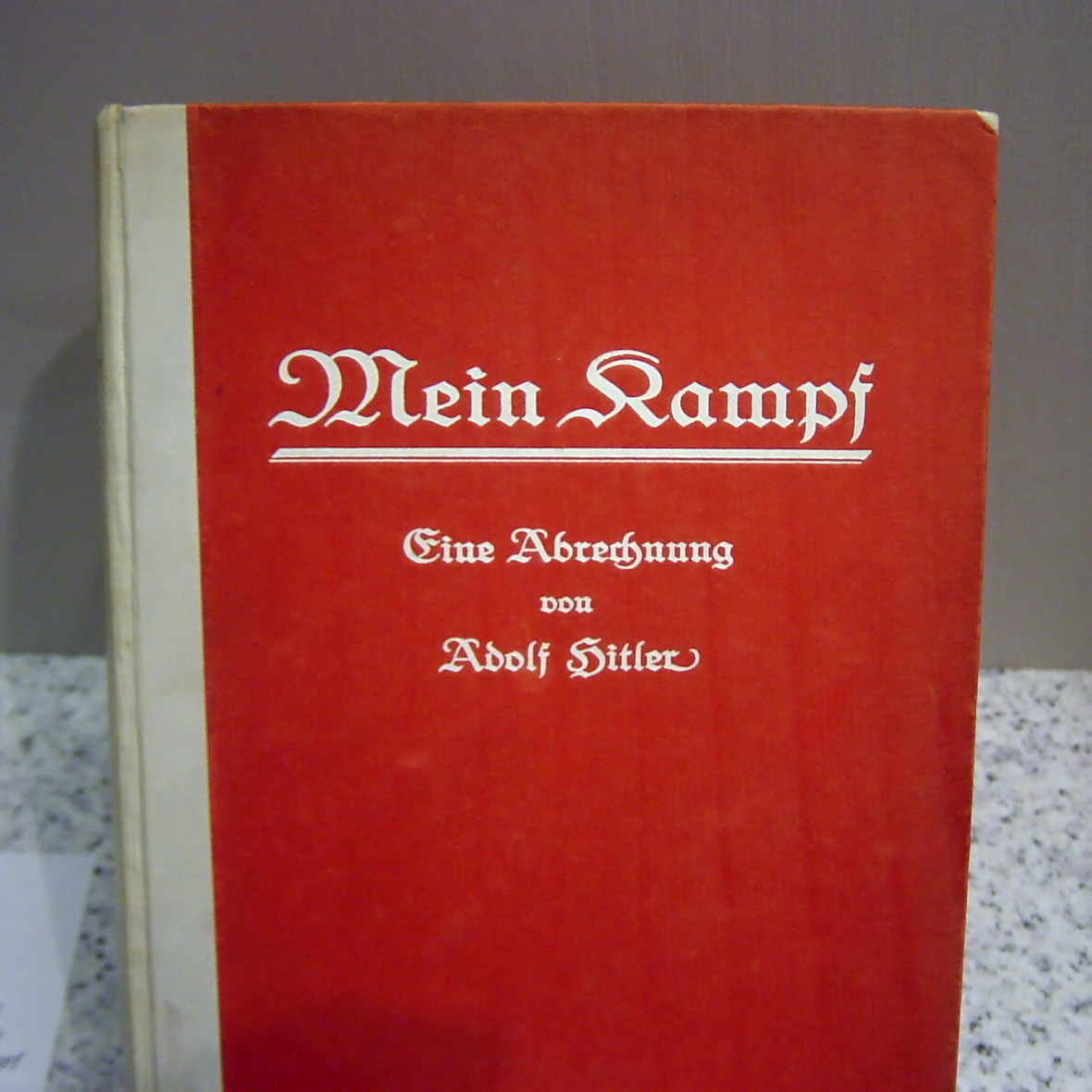
Mein Kampf in its first edition cover

For Hitler, the twin goals of the party were always German nationalist expansionism and antisemitism. These two goals were fused in his mind by his belief that Germany's external enemies—Britain, France and the Soviet Union—were controlled by the Jews and that Germany's future wars of national expansion would necessarily entail a war of annihilation against them. For Hitler and his principal lieutenants, national and racial issues were always dominant. This was symbolised by the adoption as the party emblem of the swastika. In German nationalist circles, the swastika was considered a symbol of an "Aryan race", and Hitler said concerning the swastika and concerns of its pagan origin: “How can you carry your heathenish symbol in the van of this struggle when the Christian Cross alone is called to lead it? To that I say: This symbol is not directed against the Christian Cross. On the contrary, it is the political manifestation of what the Christian Cross intends or must intend. For, in the last analysis, one cannot designate the struggle which, for example, the Center Party or the Bavarian People's Party conducts as the struggle of the Christian Cross.”

The Nazi Party grew significantly during 1921 and 1922, partly through Hitler's oratorical skills, partly through the SA's appeal to unemployed young men, and partly because there was a backlash against socialist and liberal politics in Bavaria as Germany's economic problems deepened and the weakness of the Weimar regime became apparent. The party recruited former World War I soldiers, to whom Hitler as a decorated frontline veteran could particularly appeal, as well as small businessmen and disaffected former members of rival parties. Nazi rallies were often held in beer halls, where downtrodden men could get free beer. The Hitler Youth was formed for the children of party members. The party also formed groups in other parts of Germany. Julius Streicher in Nuremberg was an early recruit and became editor of the racist magazine Der Stürmer. In December 1920, the Nazi Party had acquired a newspaper, the Völkischer Beobachter, of which its leading ideologist Alfred Rosenberg became editor. Others to join the party around this time were Heinrich Himmler and World War I flying ace Hermann Göring.

==== Adoption of Italian fascism: The Beer Hall Putsch ====
On 31 October 1922, a fascist party with similar policies and objectives came into power in Italy, the National Fascist Party, under the leadership of the charismatic Benito Mussolini. The Fascists, like the Nazis, promoted a national rebirth of their country, as they opposed communism and liberalism; appealed to the working-class; opposed the Treaty of Versailles; and advocated the territorial expansion of their country. Hitler was inspired by Mussolini and the Fascists, beginning to adopt elements of their program for the Nazi Party and himself. The Italian Fascists also used a straight-armed Roman salute and wore black-shirted uniforms; Hitler would later borrow their use of the straight-armed salute as a Nazi salute. The Nazis self-identified as Fascists; in November 1922 just a few days after the March on Rome Hermann Esser declared Hitler to be a “German Mussolini” while later that month Hitler demanded a national government for Germany based on the Fascist model. In August 1923 Hitler declared “With fanatic determination we Fascists must pursue our goal”. Kurt Lüdecke was sent to Rome to negotiate with Mussolini on behalf of the Nazi Party.

When the Fascists took control of Italy through their coup d'état called the "March on Rome", Hitler began planning his own coup less than a month later. In January 1923, France occupied the Ruhr industrial region as a result of Germany's failure to meet its reparations payments. This led to economic chaos, the resignation of Wilhelm Cuno's government and an attempt by the German Communist Party (KPD) to stage a revolution. The reaction to these events was an upsurge of nationalist sentiment. Nazi Party membership grew sharply to about 20,000, compared to the approximate 6,000 at the beginning of 1923. By November 1923, Hitler had decided that the time was right for an attempt to seize power in Munich, in the hope that the Reichswehr (the post-war German military) would mutiny against the Berlin government and join his revolt. In this, he was influenced by former General Erich Ludendorff, who had become a supporter—though not a member—of the Nazis.

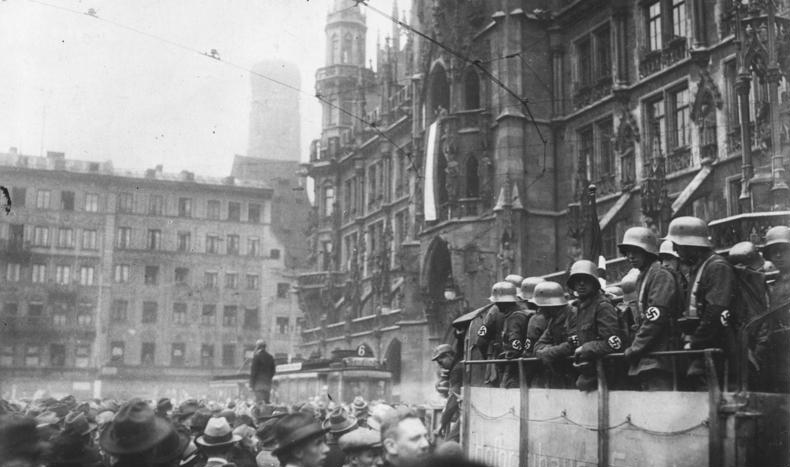
Nazis during the Beer Hall Putsch in Munich

On the night of 8 November, the Nazis used a patriotic rally in a Munich beer hall to launch an attempted putsch ("coup d'état"). This so-called Beer Hall Putsch attempt failed almost at once when the local Reichswehr commanders refused to support it. On the morning of 9 November, the Nazis staged a march of about 2,000 supporters through Munich in an attempt to rally support. The two groups exchanged fire, after which 15 putschists, four police officers, and a bystander lay dead. Hitler, Ludendorff and a number of others were arrested and were tried for treason in March 1924. Hitler and his associates were given very lenient prison sentences. While Hitler was in prison, he wrote his semi-autobiographical political manifesto Mein Kampf ("My Struggle").

The Nazi Party was banned on 9 November 1923; however, with the support of the nationalist Völkisch-Social Bloc (Völkisch-Sozialer Block), it continued to operate under the name "German Party" (Deutsche Partei or DP) from 1924 to 1925. The Nazis failed to remain unified in the DP, as in the north, the right-wing Volkish nationalist supporters of the Nazis moved to the new German Völkisch Freedom Party, leaving the north's left-wing Nazi members, such as Joseph Goebbels retaining support for the party.

=== Rise to power: 1925–1933 ===
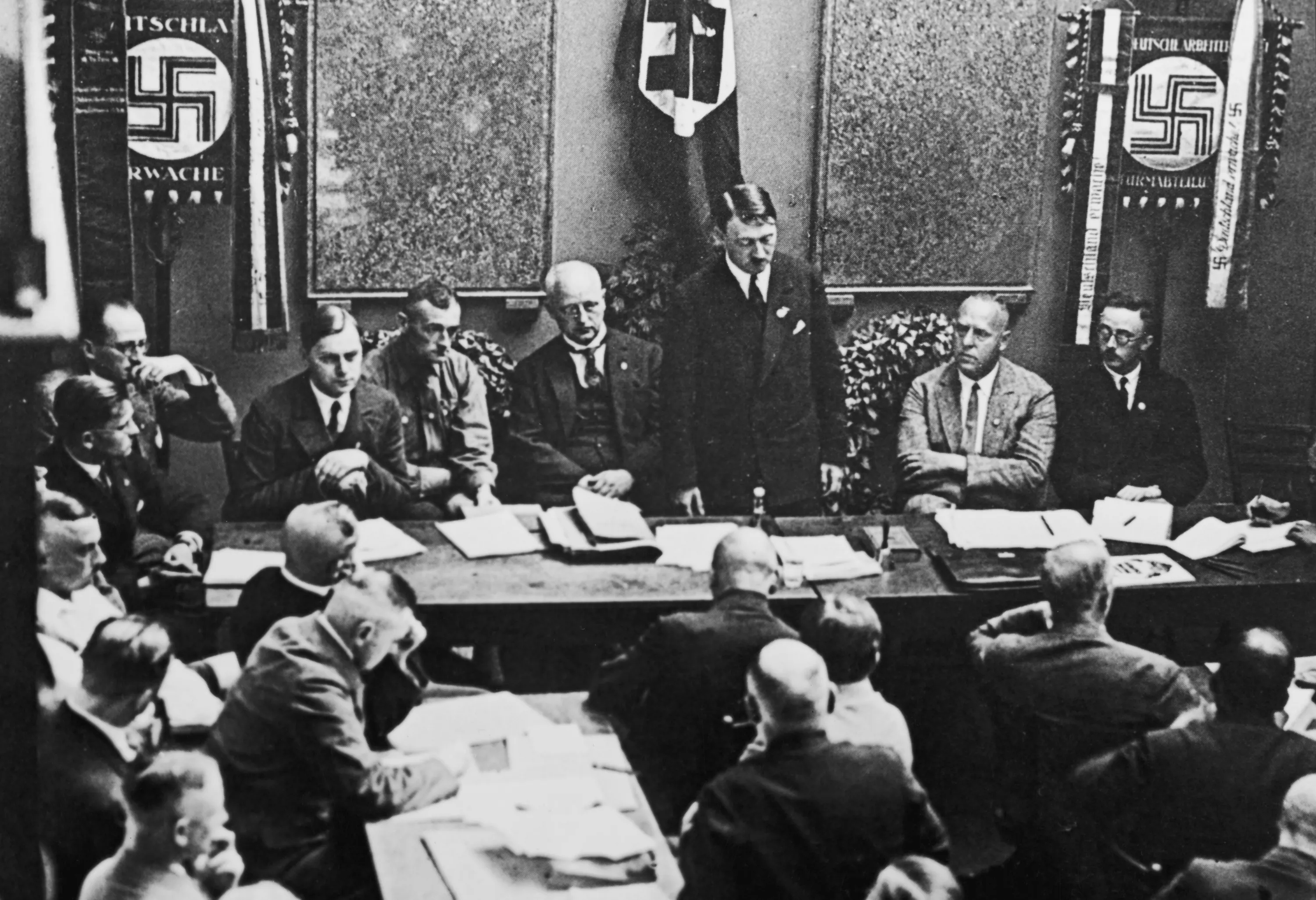
Adolf Hitler (standing) delivers a speech on the occasion of the refoundation of the NSDAP in February of 1925. Next to him from the perspective of the onlooker: On the right: Gregor Strasser and Heinrich Himmler. On the left: Franz Xaver Schwarz, Walter Buch and Alfred Rosenberg. Behind Hitler the Blutfahne (blood-flag), a central relique within the propaganda of the National-Socialists, can be seen attached to the wall.

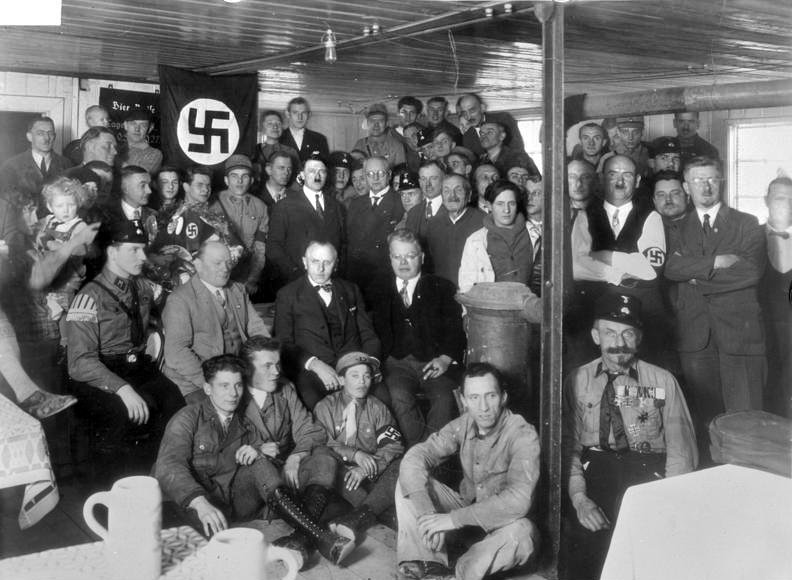
Hitler with Nazi Party members in 1930

Pardoned by the Bavarian Supreme Court, Hitler was released from prison on 20 December 1924, against the state prosecutor's objections. On 16 February 1925, Hitler convinced the Bavarian authorities to lift the ban on the NSDAP and the party was formally refounded on 26 February 1925, with Hitler as its undisputed leader. It was at this time Hitler began referring to himself as "der Führer". The new Nazi Party was no longer a paramilitary organisation and disavowed any intention of taking power by force. In any case, the economic and political situation had stabilised and the extremist upsurge of 1923 had faded, so there was no prospect of further revolutionary adventures. Instead, Hitler intended to alter the party's strategy to achieving power through what he called the "path of legality". The Nazi Party of 1925 was divided into the "Leadership Corps" (Korps der politischen Leiter) appointed by Hitler and the general membership (Parteimitglieder). The party and the SA were kept separate and the legal aspect of the party's work was emphasised. In a sign of this, the party began to admit women. The SA and the SS members (the latter founded in 1925 as Hitler's bodyguard, and known originally as the Schutzkommando) had to all be regular party members.

In the 1920s the Nazi Party expanded beyond its Bavarian base. At this time, it began surveying voters in order to determine what they were dissatisfied with in Germany, allowing Nazi propaganda to be altered accordingly. Catholic Bavaria maintained its nostalgia for a Catholic monarch; and Westphalia, along with working-class "Red Berlin", were always the Nazis' weakest areas electorally, even during the Third Reich itself. The areas of strongest Nazi support were in rural Protestant areas such as Schleswig-Holstein, Mecklenburg, Pomerania and East Prussia. Depressed working-class areas such as Thuringia also produced a strong Nazi vote, while the workers of the Ruhr and Hamburg largely remained loyal to the Social Democrats, the Communist Party of Germany or the Catholic Centre Party. Nuremberg remained a Nazi Party stronghold, and the first Nuremberg Rally was held there in 1927. These rallies soon became massive displays of Nazi paramilitary power and attracted many recruits. The Nazis' strongest appeal was to the lower middle-classes—farmers, public servants, teachers and small businessmen—who had suffered most from the inflation of the 1920s, so who feared Bolshevism more than anything else. The small business class was receptive to Hitler's antisemitism, since it blamed Jewish big business for its economic problems. University students, disappointed at being too young to have served in the War of 1914–1918 and attracted by the Nazis' radical rhetoric, also became a strong Nazi constituency. By 1929, the party had 130,000 members.

The party's nominal Deputy Leader was Rudolf Hess, but he had no real power in the party. By the early 1930s, the senior leaders of the party after Hitler were Heinrich Himmler, Joseph Goebbels and Hermann Göring. Beneath the Leadership Corps were the party's regional leaders, the Gauleiters, each of whom commanded the party in his Gau ("region"). Goebbels began his ascent through the party hierarchy as Gauleiter of Berlin-Brandenburg in 1926. Streicher was Gauleiter of Franconia, where he published his antisemitic newspaper Der Stürmer. Beneath the Gauleiter were lower-level officials, the Kreisleiter ("county leaders"), Zellenleiter ("cell leaders") and Blockleiter ("block leaders"). This was a strictly hierarchical structure in which orders flowed from the top and unquestioning loyalty was given to superiors. The SA alone escaped this hierarchy, remaining a self-administered formation answerable only to Hitler. Being composed largely of unemployed workers, many SA men took the Nazis' socialist rhetoric seriously. At this time, the Hitler salute (borrowed from the Italian fascists) and the greeting "Heil Hitler!" were adopted throughout the party.

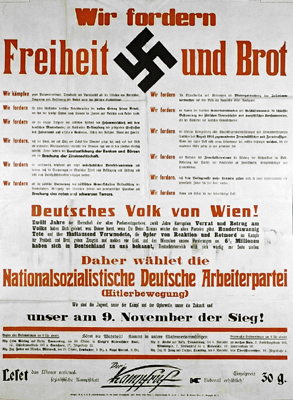
Nazi Party election poster used in Vienna in 1930 (translation: "We demand freedom and bread")

The Nazis contested elections to the national parliament (the Reichstag) and to the state legislature (the Landtage) from 1924, although at first with little success. The "National Socialist Freedom Movement" polled 3% of the vote in the December 1924 Reichstag elections and this fell to 2.6% in 1928. In state (Landtag) elections of 1926–27, the party polled between roughly 1.6% and 2.5% of the vote, producing comparably poor results. Despite these poor results and despite Germany's relative political stability and prosperity during the later 1920s, the Nazi Party continued to grow. This was partly because Hitler, who had no administrative ability, left the party organisation to the head of the secretariat, Philipp Bouhler, the party treasurer Franz Xaver Schwarz and business manager Max Amann. The party had a capable propaganda head in Gregor Strasser, who was promoted to national organizational leader in January 1928. These men gave the party efficient recruitment and organizational structures. The Nazi party also owed its growth to the gradual fading away of competitor nationalist groups, such as the German National People's Party (DNVP), which disintegrated during the party crises of the late 1920s and lost much of its constituency to the NSDAP. As Hitler became the recognised head of the German nationalists, other groups declined or were absorbed. According to Thomas Childers, in the late 1920s — seeing the party's failure to break into the mainstream after the 1928 election — Goebbels proposed shifting propaganda efforts away from major cities, where the party faced competition from other political movements, toward rural areas, where rallies would be more effective.

Despite these strengths, the Nazi Party might never have come to power had it not been for the Great Depression and its effects on Germany. By 1932, the German economy was beset with mass unemployment and widespread business failures. The Social Democrats and Communists were bitterly divided and unable to formulate an effective solution: this gave the Nazis their opportunity and Hitler's message, blaming the crisis on the Jewish financiers and the Bolsheviks, resonated with wide sections of the electorate. At the September 1930 Reichstag elections, the Nazis won 18% of the votes and became the second-largest party in the Reichstag after the Social Democrats. Hitler proved to be a highly effective campaigner, pioneering the use of radio and aircraft for this purpose. His dismissal of Otto Strasser and his appointment of Goebbels as the party's propaganda chief were major factors. While Strasser had used his position to promote his own leftish version of national socialism, Goebbels was completely loyal to Hitler, and worked only to improve Hitler's image.

The 1930 elections changed the German political landscape by weakening the traditional nationalist parties, the DNVP and the DVP, leaving the Nazis as the chief alternative to the discredited Social Democrats and the Zentrum, whose leader, Heinrich Brüning, headed a weak minority government. The inability of the democratic parties to form a united front, the self-imposed isolation of the Communists and the continued decline of the economy, all played into Hitler's hands. He now came to be seen as de facto leader of the opposition and donations poured into the Nazi Party's coffers. Some major business figures, such as Fritz Thyssen, were Nazi supporters and gave generously and some Wall Street figures were allegedly involved, but many other businessmen were suspicious of the extreme nationalist tendencies of the Nazis and preferred to support the traditional conservative parties instead.

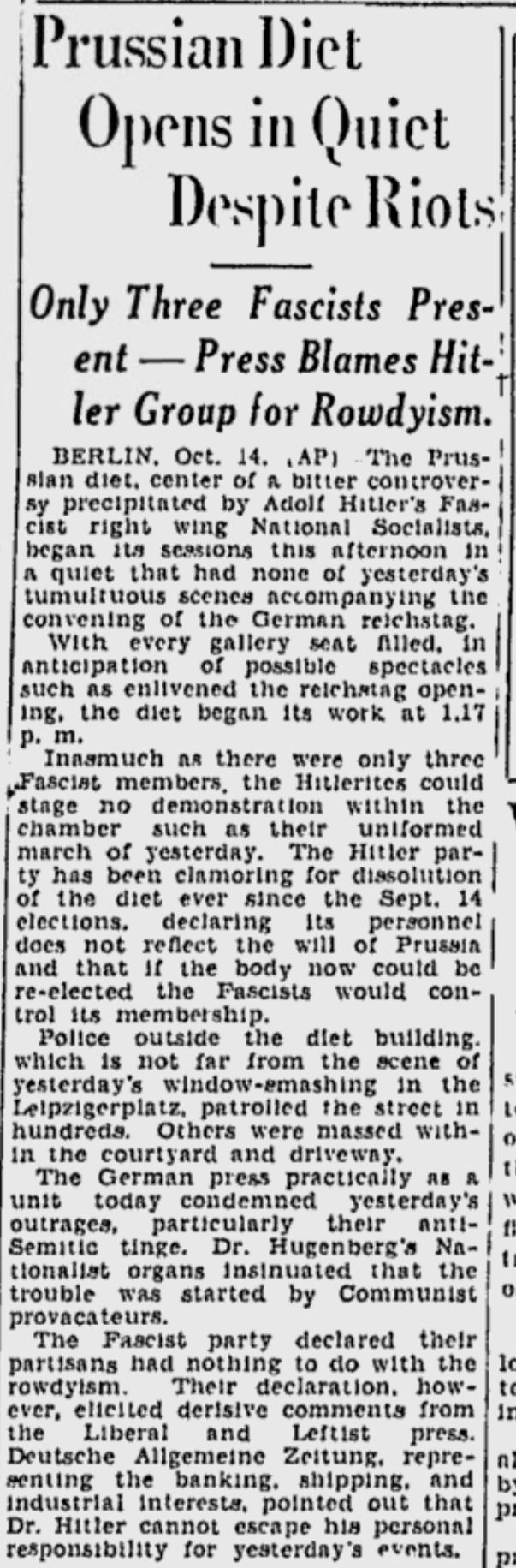
Article from “The Day” Newspaper reporting on recent rioting incidents concerning the Nazi Party, October 14 1930

In 1930, as the price for joining a coalition government of the Land (state) of Thuringia, the Nazi Party received the state ministries of the Interior and Education. On 23 January 1930, Wilhelm Frick was appointed to these ministries, becoming the first Nazi to hold a ministerial-level post at any level in Germany.

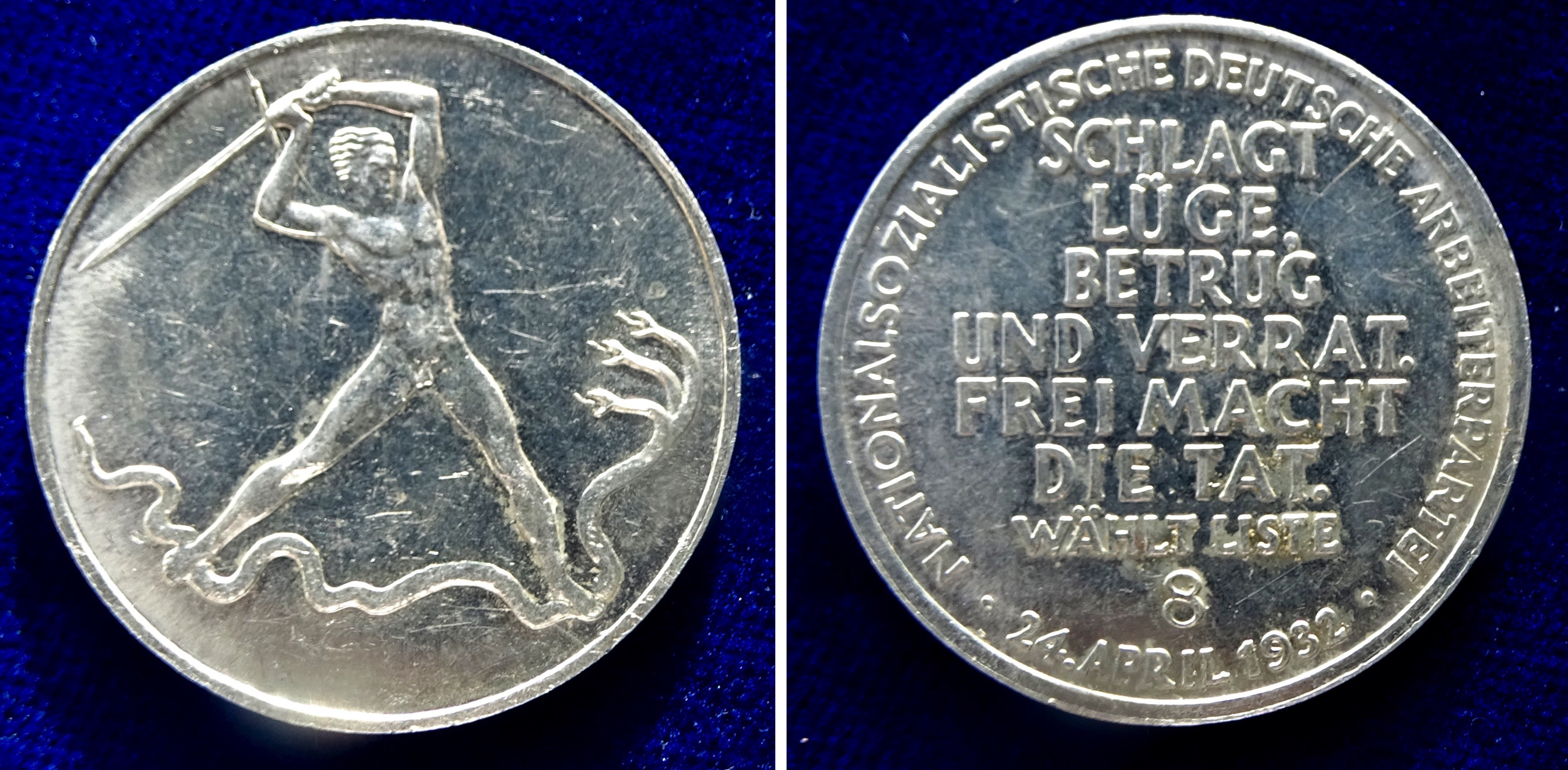
German NSDAP Donation Token 1932, Free State of Prussia elections

In 1931 the Nazi Party altered its strategy to engage in perpetual campaigning across the country, even outside of election time. During 1931 and into 1932, Germany's political crisis deepened. Hitler ran for president against the incumbent Paul von Hindenburg in March 1932, polling 30% in the first round and 37% in the second against Hindenburg's 49% and 53%. By now the SA had 400,000 members and its running street battles with the SPD and Communist paramilitaries (who also fought each other) reduced some German cities to combat zones. Paradoxically, although the Nazis were among the main instigators of this disorder, part of Hitler's appeal to a frightened and demoralised middle class was his promise to restore law and order. Overt antisemitism was played down in official Nazi rhetoric, but was never far from the surface. Germans voted for Hitler primarily because of his promises to revive the economy (by unspecified means), to restore German greatness and overturn the Treaty of Versailles and to save Germany from communism. On 24 April 1932, the Free State of Prussia elections to the Landtag resulted in 36% of the votes and 162 seats for the NSDAP.

On 20 July 1932, the Prussian government was ousted by a coup, the Preussenschlag; a few days later at the July 1932 Reichstag election the Nazis made another leap forward, polling 37% and becoming the largest party in parliament by a wide margin. Furthermore, the Nazis and the Communists between them won 52% of the vote and a majority of seats. Since both parties opposed the established political system and neither would join or support any ministry, this made the formation of a majority government impossible. The result was weak ministries governing by decree. Under Comintern directives, the Communists maintained their policy of treating the Social Democrats as the main enemy, calling them "social fascists", thereby splintering opposition to the Nazis. (Note: "Social democracy is objectively the moderate wing of fascism. ... These organisations (ie Fascism and social democracy) are not antipodes, they are twins." (J.V. Stalin: Concerning the International Situation (September 1924), in Works, Volume 6, 1953; p. 294.) This later led Otto Wille Kuusinen to conclude that "The aims of the fascists and the social-fascists are the same." (Report To the 10th Plenum of ECCI, in International Press Correspondence, Volume 9, no. 40, (20 August 1929), p. 848.)) Later, both the Social Democrats and the Communists accused each other of having facilitated Hitler's rise to power by their unwillingness to compromise.

Chancellor Franz von Papen called another Reichstag election in November, hoping to find a way out of this impasse. The electoral result was the same, with the Nazis and the Communists winning 50% of the vote between them and more than half the seats, rendering this Reichstag no more workable than its predecessor. However, support for the Nazis had fallen to 33.1%, suggesting that the Nazi surge had passed its peak—possibly because the worst of the Depression had passed, possibly because some middle-class voters had supported Hitler in July as a protest, but had now drawn back from the prospect of actually putting him into power. The Nazis interpreted the result as a warning that they must seize power before their moment passed. Had the other parties united, this could have been prevented, but their shortsightedness made a united front impossible. Papen, his successor Kurt von Schleicher and the nationalist press magnate Alfred Hugenberg spent December and January in political intrigues that eventually persuaded President Hindenburg that it was safe to appoint Hitler as Reich Chancellor, at the head of a cabinet including only a minority of Nazi ministers—which he did on 30 January 1933.

==== Ascension and consolidation ====
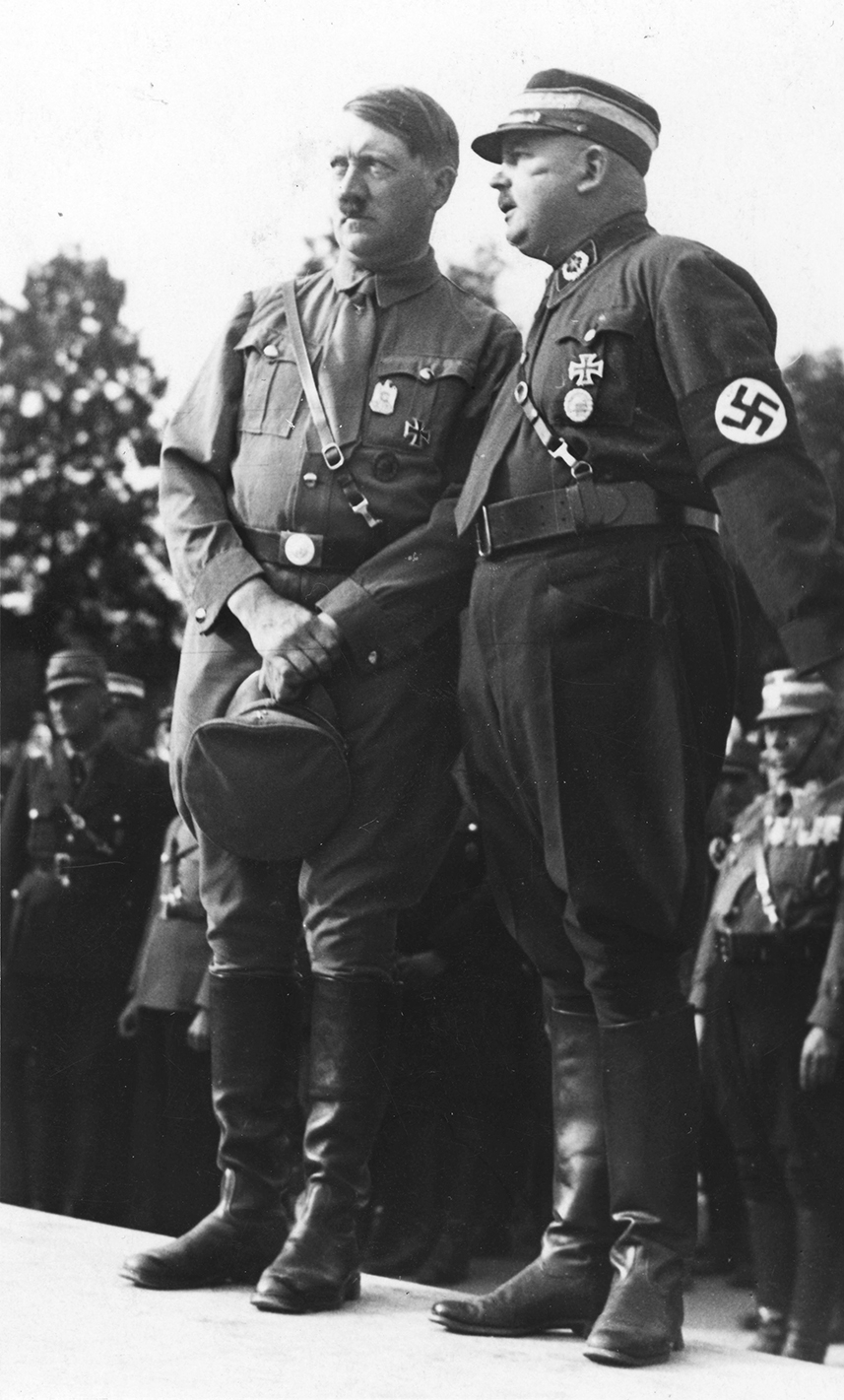
Reichsparteitag (Nuremberg Rally): Nazi Party leader Adolf Hitler and SA-leader Ernst Röhm, August 1933

In Mein Kampf, Hitler directly attacked both left-wing and right-wing politicians in Germany on foreign policy and causing the nation to be disarmed after 1918, although calling out the former in particular. (Note: Hitler stated: "Today our left-wing politicians in particular are constantly insisting that their craven-hearted and obsequious foreign policy necessarily results from the disarmament of Germany, whereas the truth is that this is the policy of traitors [...] But the politicians of the Right deserve exactly the same reproach. It was through their miserable cowardice that those ruffians of Jews who came into power in 1918 were able to rob the nation of its arms.") However, a majority of scholars identify Nazism in practice as being a far-right form of politics. In April 1921, Hitler gave a speech where he declared:

“There are only two possibilities in Germany; do not imagine that the people will forever go with the middle party, the party of compromises; one day it will turn to those who have most consistently foretold the coming ruin and have sought to dissociate themselves from it. And that party is either the Left: and then God help us! for it will lead us to complete destruction - to Bolshevism, or else it is a party of the Right which at the last, when the people is in utter despair, when it has lost all its spirit and has no longer any faith in anything, is determined for its part ruthlessly to seize the reins of power - that is the beginning of resistance of which I spoke a few minutes ago. Here, too, there can be no compromise - there are only two possibilities: either victory of the Aryan or annihilation of the Aryan and the victory of the Jew.”

When asked in an interview in 1934 whether the Nazis were "bourgeois right-wing" as alleged by their opponents, Hitler responded that Nazism was not exclusively for any class.

The German newspaper General-Anzeiger reported on a dispute in 1930 between the Nazi Party and the German National People's Party (DNVP), their representatives being Wilhelm Frick and Oskar Hergt respectively, concerning the seating arrangement in the Reichstag whilst Paul Löbe was serving as President of the Reichstag:

Who is furthest to the right? Berlin, September 23. In the Reichstag on Tuesday afternoon, President Löbe gathered representatives of the various parties to discuss the question of seating, which had become difficult due to the increase in the number of seats. At the end of the meeting, a dispute arose between the representatives of the German Nationals and the National Socialists over which of the two parties was the more explicitly right-wing party. Representative Hergt once again asserted his party's claim to the seat on the far-right wing of the House. Representative Dr. Frick protested against this demand. He believed that this question had been settled once and for all, namely in the sense that the National Socialists were the most right-wing party. The claim of the National Socialists was provisionally recognized in today's discussion, however subject to any agreement between the two parties or any other decision by the Council of Elders after the Reichstag has convened.

The votes that the Nazis received in the 1932 elections established the Nazi Party as the largest parliamentary faction of the Weimar Republic government. Hitler was appointed as Chancellor of Germany on 30 January 1933.

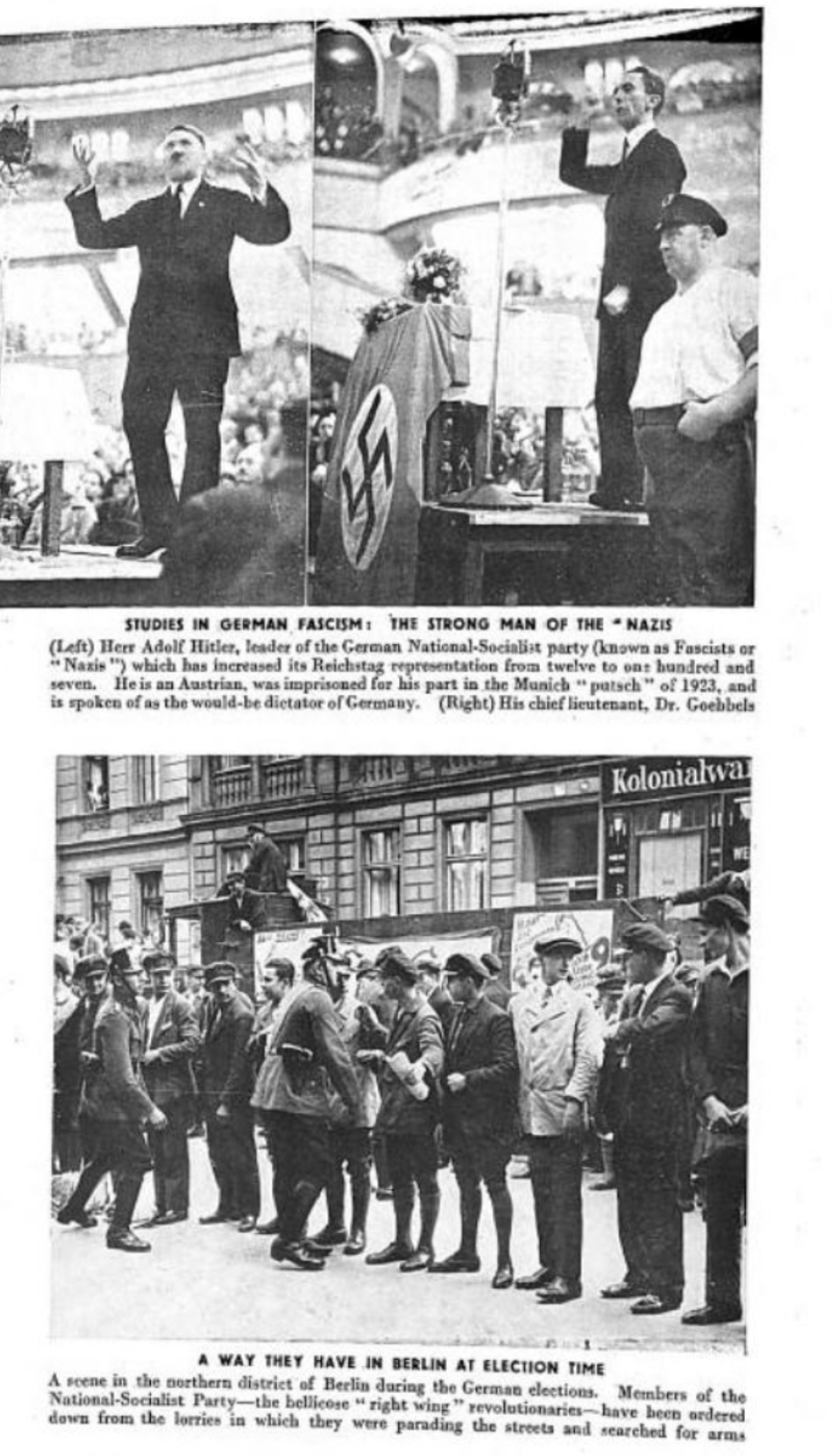
“The Graphic” report on the Nazi Party in Germany, September 20, 1930.

After Nazi Party’s electoral victories and Hitler becoming Chancellor, the German newspaper Bergische Wacht reported on foreign reactions:

From the English press: While the reports in the English newspapers go beyond mere factual accounts, the view is expressed that the victory of the right wing, or rather the National Socialists, is attributable to their captivating propaganda or, as some correspondents put it, to their masterful directing, which succeeded in bringing millions of people, who previously abstained from voting out of political indifference, to the polls. The liberal "News Chronicle" emphasizes that the members of the Centre Party and the Social Democrats remained loyal to their parties. While the paper places its hopes on the German Left, the "Daily Express" believes it can expect a modification of the Reich government's policies in order to build a greater Germany than the world has ever seen. Speculation that a new development is to be expected in foreign policy can be found in the conservative press. The Daily Telegraph draws attention to the newspaper article in which Foreign Minister Baron von Neurath declares that Germany's patience on the disarmament issue is exhausted and that German objections to security might be expressed more clearly in the near future. The paper's diplomatic correspondent expresses a similar expectation. The Berlin correspondent of The Times comments on the new auxiliary police force and speaks of a significant increase in Germany's armed forces.

The Reichstag fire on 27 February 1933 gave Hitler a pretext for suppressing his political opponents. The following day he persuaded the Reich's President Paul von Hindenburg to issue the Reichstag Fire Decree, which suspended most civil liberties. The NSDAP won the parliamentary election on 5 March 1933 with 44% of votes, but failed to win an absolute majority. After the election, hundreds of thousands of new members joined the party for opportunistic reasons, most of them civil servants and white-collar workers. They were nicknamed the "casualties of March" (German: Märzgefallenen) or "March violets" (German: Märzveilchen). To protect the party from too many non-ideological turncoats who were viewed by the so-called "old fighters" (alte Kämpfer) with some mistrust, the party issued a freeze on admissions that remained in force from May 1933 to 1937.

On 23 March, the parliament passed the Enabling Act of 1933, which gave the cabinet the right to enact laws without the consent of parliament. In effect, this gave Hitler dictatorial powers. Now possessing virtually absolute power, the Nazis established totalitarian control as they abolished labour unions and other political parties and imprisoned their political opponents, first at wilde Lager, improvised camps, then in concentration camps. Nazi Germany had been established, yet the Reichswehr remained impartial. Nazi power over Germany remained virtual, not absolute.

NSDAP federal election results (1924–1933)
Election	Votes			Seats		Notes
Election	No.	%	+/–	No.	+/–	Notes
May 1924 (as National Socialist Freedom Movement)	1,918,300	6.5 (No. 6)		32 / 472		Hitler in prison
December 1924 (as National Socialist Freedom Movement)	907,300	3.0 (No. 8)	▼3.5	14 / 493	▼18	Hitler released from prison
May 1928	810,100	2.6 (No. 9)	▼0.4	12 / 491	▼2	
September 1930	6,409,600	18.3 (No. 2)	▲15.7	107 / 577	▲95	After the financial crisis
July 1932	13,745,000	37.3 (No. 1)	▲19.0	230 / 608	▲123	After Hitler was candidate for presidency
November 1932	11,737,000	33.1 (No. 1)	▼4.2	196 / 584	▼34	
March 1933	17,277,180	43.9 (No. 1)	▲10.8	288 / 647	▲92	During Hitler's term as Chancellor of Germany

=== After taking power: intertwining of party and state ===
The Nazis embarked on a campaign of Gleichschaltung (coordination) to exert their control over all aspects of German government and society. During June and July 1933, all competing parties were either outlawed or dissolved themselves and subsequently the Law Against the Formation of Parties of 14 July 1933 legally established the Nazi Party's monopoly. On 1 December 1933, the Law to Secure the Unity of Party and State entered into force, which was the base for a progressive intertwining of party structures and state apparatus. By this law, the SA—actually a party division—was given quasi-governmental authority and their Stabschef became a cabinet minister without portfolio. By virtue of the 30 January 1934 Law on the Reconstruction of the Reich, the Länder (states) lost their sovereignty and were demoted to administrative divisions of the Reich government. Effectively, they lost most of their power to the Gaue that were originally just regional divisions of the party, but took over most competencies of the state administration in their respective sectors.

During the Röhm Purge of 30 June to 2 July 1934 (also known as the "Night of the Long Knives"), Hitler disempowered the SA's leadership—most of whom belonged to the Strasserist (national revolutionary) faction within the NSDAP—and ordered them killed. He accused them of having conspired to stage a coup d'état, but it is believed that this was only a pretence to justify the suppression of any intraparty opposition. The purge was executed by the SS, assisted by the Gestapo and Reichswehr army units. Aside from Strasserist Nazis, they also murdered anti-Nazi conservative figures like former chancellor von Schleicher. After this, the SA continued to exist but lost much of its importance, while the role of the SS grew significantly. Formerly only a sub-organisation of the SA, it was made into a separate organisation of the NSDAP in July 1934.

Upon the death of President Hindenburg on 2 August 1934, Hitler merged the offices of party leader, head of state and chief of government in one, taking the title of Führer und Reichskanzler by passage of the Law Concerning the Head of State of the German Reich. The Chancellery of the Führer, officially an organisation of the Nazi Party, took over the functions of the Office of the President (a government agency), blurring the distinction between structures of party and state even further. The SS increasingly exerted police functions, a development which was formally documented by the merger of the offices of Reichsführer-SS and Chief of the German Police on 17 June 1936, as the position was held by Heinrich Himmler who derived his authority directly from Hitler. The Sicherheitsdienst (SD, formally the "Security Service of the Reichsführer-SS") that had been created in 1931 as an intraparty intelligence became the de facto intelligence agency of Nazi Germany. It was put under the Reich Security Main Office (RSHA) in 1939, which then coordinated SD, Gestapo and criminal police, therefore functioning as a hybrid organisation of state and party structures.

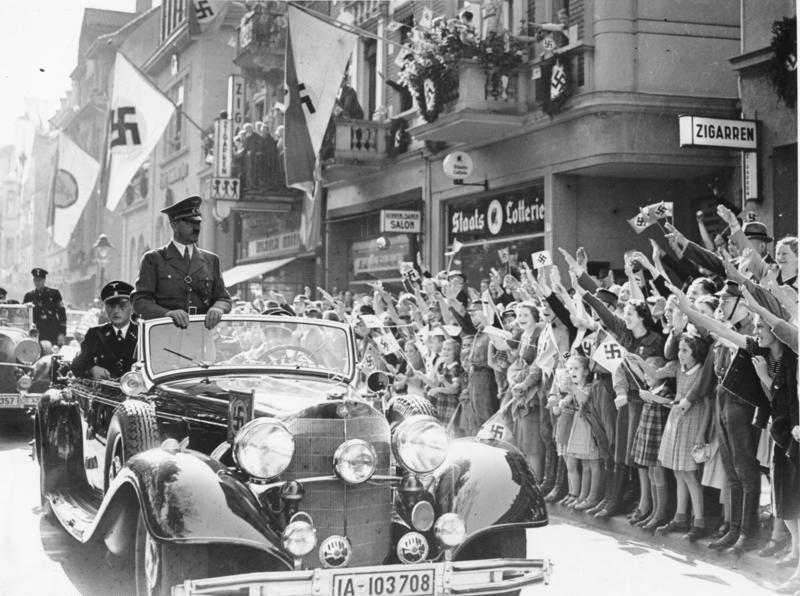
Adolf Hitler in Bonn in 1938

NSDAP election and referendum results in the Reichstag under Nazi Germany (1933–1938)
Election	Votes	%	Seats
November 1933	39,655,224	92.1	661 / 661
1936	44,462,458	98.8	741 / 741
1938	44,451,092	99.0	813 / 813

=== Defeat and abolition ===
Officially, Nazi Germany lasted only 12 years. The Instrument of Surrender was signed by representatives of the German High Command at Berlin, on 8 May 1945, when the war ended in Europe. The party was formally abolished on 10 October 1945 by the Allied Control Council, followed by the process of denazification along with trials of major war criminals before the International Military Tribunal (IMT) in Nuremberg. Part of the Potsdam Agreement called for the destruction of the Nazi Party alongside the requirement for the reconstruction of the German political life. In addition, the Control Council Law no. 2 Providing for the Termination and Liquidation of the Nazi Organization specified the abolition of 52 other Nazi affiliated and supervised organisations and outlawed their activities. The denazification was carried out in Germany and continued until the onset of the Cold War.

Between 1939 and 1945, the Nazi Party led regime, assisted by collaborationist governments and recruits from occupied countries, was responsible for the deaths of at least twenty million people, including 5.5 to 6 million Jews (representing two-thirds of the Jewish population of Europe), and between 200,000 and 1,500,000 Romani people. The estimated total number includes the killing of nearly two million non-Jewish Poles, over three million Soviet prisoners of war, communists, and other political opponents, homosexuals, the physically and mentally disabled.

== Political programme ==
The National Socialist Programme was a formulation of the policies of the party. It contained 25 points and is therefore also known as the "25-point plan" or "25-point programme". It was the official party programme, with minor changes, from its proclamation as such by Hitler in 1920, when the party was still the German Workers' Party, until its dissolution.

== Party composition ==
=== Command structure ===
==== Top leadership ====
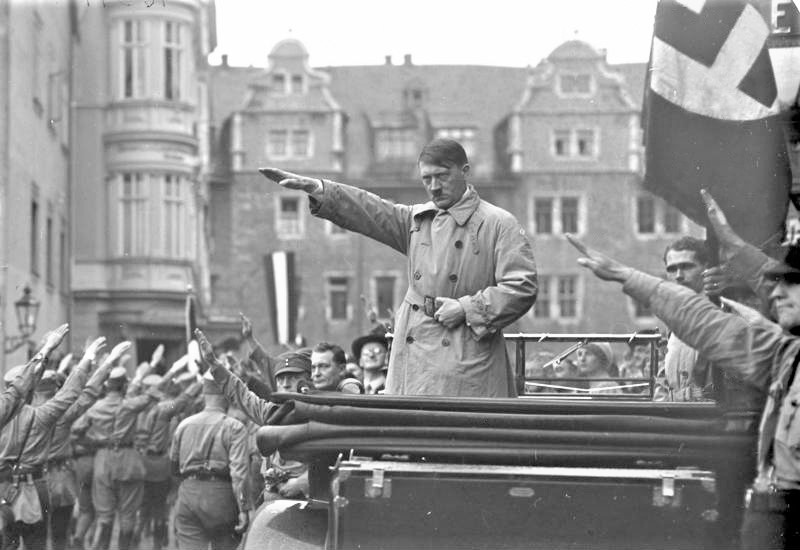
Adolf Hitler and Rudolf Hess in Weimar in 1930

At the top of the Nazi Party was the party chairman ("Der Führer"), who held absolute power and full command over the party. All other party offices were subordinate to his position and had to depend on his instructions. In 1934, Hitler founded a separate body for the chairman, Chancellery of the Führer, with its own sub-units.

Below the Führer's chancellery was first the "Staff of the Deputy Führer", headed by Rudolf Hess from 21 April 1933 to 10 May 1941; and then the "Party Chancellery" (Parteikanzlei), headed by Martin Bormann.

Following Hitler's suicide on 30 April 1945, Bormann would be named as Party Minister, which gave him the top position in the Nazi Party itself; unlike Hitler, however, Bormann would not have a leadership role over the government of Nazi Germany. Bormann, whose fate would remain unknown for several decades, would soon afterwards commit suicide as well on 2 May 1945 while trying to flee Berlin around the time Soviet Union forces captured the city. His remains were first identified in 1972, then again in 1998 through DNA testing.

==== Reichsleiter ====
Directly subjected to the Führer were the Reichsleiter ("Reich Leader(s)"—the singular and plural forms are identical in German), whose number was gradually increased to eighteen. They held power and influence comparable to the Reich Ministers' in Hitler's Cabinet. The eighteen Reichsleiter formed the "Reich Leadership of the Nazi Party" (Reichsleitung der NSDAP), which was established at the so-called Brown House in Munich. Unlike a Gauleiter, a Reichsleiter did not have individual geographic areas under their command, but were responsible for specific spheres of interest.

=== Nazi Party offices ===
The Nazi Party had a number of party offices dealing with various political and other matters. These included:

- Rassenpolitisches Amt der NSDAP (RPA): "NSDAP Office of Racial Policy"
- Außenpolitische Amt der NSDAP (APA): "NSDAP Office of Foreign Affairs"
- Kolonialpolitisches Amt der NSDAP (KPA): "NSDAP Office of Colonial Policy"
- Wehrpolitisches Amt der NSDAP (WPA): "NSDAP Office of Military Policy"
- Amt Rosenberg (ARo): "Rosenberg Office"

=== Paramilitary groups ===
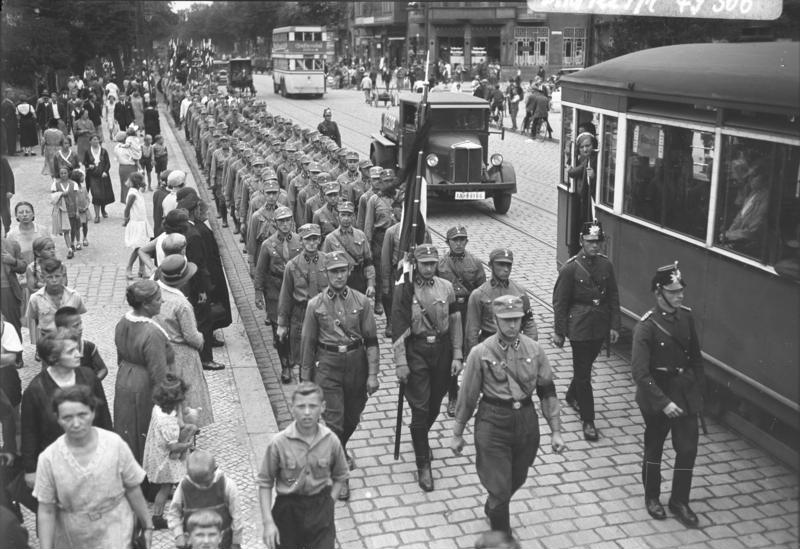
The SA in Berlin in 1932. The group had nearly two million members at the end of 1932.

In addition to the Nazi Party itself, several paramilitary groups existed that "supported" Nazi aims. All members of these paramilitary organisations were required to first become regular members of the Nazi Party before they could enlist in the group of their choice. An exception was the Waffen-SS, considered the military arm of both the SS and the Nazi Party, which allowed members to enlist during the Second World War without joining the Nazi Party. Foreign volunteers in the Waffen-SS were also not required to be members of the Nazi Party, although many joined local nationalist groups in their own countries with similar aims. Police officers, including members of the Gestapo, frequently held SS rank for administrative reasons (known as "rank parity") and were likewise not required to be members of the Nazi Party.

A vast system of Nazi Party paramilitary ranks developed for each of the various paramilitary groups. This was part of the process of Gleichschaltung with the paramilitary and auxiliary groups swallowing existing associations and federations after the Party was flooded by millions of membership applications.

The major Nazi Party paramilitary groups were as follows:

- Schutzstaffel (SS): "Protection Squadron" (both Allgemeine SS and Waffen-SS)
- Sturmabteilung (SA): "Storm Division"
- Nationalsozialistisches Fliegerkorps (NSFK): "National Socialist Flyers Corps"
- Nationalsozialistisches Kraftfahrerkorps (NSKK): "National Socialist Motor Corps"

The Hitler Youth was a paramilitary group divided into an adult leadership corps and a general membership open to boys aged fourteen to eighteen. The League of German Girls was the equivalent group for girls.

=== Affiliated organisations ===
Certain nominally independent organisations had their own legal representation and own property, but were supported by the Nazi Party. Many of these associated organisations were labour unions of various professions. Some were older organisations that were Nazified according to the Gleichschaltung policy after the 1933 takeover.

- Reich League of German Officials (union of civil servants, predecessor to German Civil Service Federation)
- German Labour Front (DAF)
- National Socialist German Doctors' League
- National Socialist League for the Maintenance of the Law (NSRB, 1936–1945, earlier National Socialist German Lawyers' League)
- National Socialist War Victim's Care (NSKOV)
- National Socialist Teachers League (NSLB)
- National Socialist People's Welfare (NSV)
- Reich Labour Service (RAD)
- German Faith Movement
- German Colonial League (RKB)
- German Red Cross
- Kyffhäuser League
- Technical Emergency Relief (TENO)
- Reich's Union of Large Families
- Reichsluftschutzbund (RLB)
- Reichskolonialbund (RKB)
- Bund Deutscher Osten (BDO)
- German American Bund

The employees of large businesses with international operations such as Deutsche Bank, Dresdner Bank, and Commerzbank were mostly party members. All German businesses abroad were also required to have their own Nazi Party Ausland-Organization liaison men, which enabled the party leadership to obtain updated and excellent intelligence on the actions of the global corporate elites.

== Regional administration ==
Administrative units of the Nazi Party in 1944

For the purpose of centralisation in the Gleichschaltung process, a rigidly hierarchal structure was established in the Nazi Party, which it later carried through in the whole of Germany in order to consolidate total power under the person of Hitler (Führerstaat). It was regionally sub-divided into a number of Gaue (singular: Gau) headed by a Gauleiter, who received their orders directly from Hitler. The name (originally a term for sub-regions of the Holy Roman Empire headed by a Gaugraf) for these new provincial structures was deliberately chosen because of its mediaeval connotations. The term is approximately equivalent to the English shire.

While the Nazis maintained the nominal existence of state and regional governments in Germany itself, this policy was not extended to territories acquired after 1937. Even in German-speaking areas such as Austria, state and regional governments were formally disbanded as opposed to just being dis-empowered.

After the Anschluss a new type of administrative unit was introduced called a Reichsgau. In these territories the Gauleiters also held the position of Reichsstatthalter (Reich Governor) thereby formally combining the spheres of both party and state offices. The establishment of this type of district was subsequently carried out for any further territorial annexations of Germany both before and during World War II. Even the former territories of Prussia were never formally re-integrated into what was then Germany's largest state after being re-taken in the 1939 Polish campaign.

The Gaue and Reichsgaue (state or province) were further sub-divided into Kreise (counties) headed by a Kreisleiter, which were in turn sub-divided into Zellen (cells) and Blöcke (blocks), headed by a Zellenleiter and Blockleiter respectively.

A reorganisation of the Gaue was enacted on 1 October 1928. The given numbers were the official ordering numbers. The statistics are from 1941, for which the Gau organisation of that moment in time forms the basis. Their size and populations are not exact; for instance, according to the official party statistics the Gau Kurmark/Mark Brandenburg was the largest in the German Reich. By 1941, there were 42 territorial Gaue for Greater Germany. (Note: The 43rd Gau known as the Auslandsorganisation was non-territorial.) Of these, 10 were designated as Reichsgaue: 7 of them for Austria, one for the Sudetenland (annexed from Czechoslovakia) and two for the areas annexed from Poland and the Free City of Danzig after the joint invasion of Poland by Nazi Germany and the Soviet Union in 1939 at the onset of World War II. Getting the leadership of the individual Gaue to co-operate with one another proved difficult at times since there was constant administrative and financial jockeying for control going on between them.

The first table below describes the organizational structure for the Gaue that existed before their dissolution in 1945. Information on former Gaue (that were either renamed, or dissolved by being divided or merged with other Gaue) is provided in the second table.

=== Nazi Party Gaue ===
Nr.	Gau	Headquarters	Area (km^{2})	Inhabitants (1941)	Gauleiter
01	Baden-Alsace	Strasbourg	23,350	2,502,023	Robert Heinrich Wagner from 22 March 1941
02	Bayreuth, renaming of Gau Bayerische Ostmark 2 June 1942	Bayreuth	29,600	2,370,658	Hans Schemm (1933–1935); Fritz Wächtler (1935–1945); Ludwig Ruckdeschel from 19 April 1945
03	Berlin	Berlin	884	4,338,756	Joseph Goebbels from 1 October 1928
04	Danzig-Westpreußen	Danzig	26,057	2,287,394	Albert Forster from 10 October 1939
05	Düsseldorf	Düsseldorf	2,672	2,261,909	Friedrich Karl Florian from 1 August 1930
06	Essen	Essen	2,825	1,921,326	Josef Terboven from 1 August 1928
07	Franken, renaming of Gau Mittelfranken 21 April 1933	Nuremberg	7,618	1,077,216	Julius Streicher (1929–1940); Hans Zimmermann (1940–1942); Karl Holz from 19 March 1942
08	Halle-Merseburg	Halle an der Saale	10,202	1,578,292	Walter Ernst (1925–1926); Paul Hinkler (1926–1931); Rudolf Jordan (1931–1937); Joachim Albrecht Eggeling from 20 April 1937
09	Hamburg	Hamburg	747	1,711,877	Josef Klant (1925–1926); Albert Krebs (1926–1928); Hinrich Lohse (1928–1929); Karl Kaufmann from 15 April 1929
10	Hessen-Nassau	Frankfurt	15,030	3,117,266	Jakob Sprenger from 1 January 1933
11	Kärnten	Klagenfurt	11,554	449,713	Hans Mazenauer (1926–1927); Hugo Herzog (1927–1933); Hans vom Kothen (1933); Hubert Klausner (1933–1936); Peter Feistritzer (1936–1938); Hubert Klausner (1938–1939); Franz Kutschera (1939–1941); Friedrich Rainer from 27 November 1941
12	Köln-Aachen	Köln	8,162	2,432,095	Joseph Grohé from 1 June 1931
13	Kurhessen, renaming of Gau Hessen-Nord 1934	Kassel	9,200	971,887	Walter Schultz (1925–1928); Karl Weinrich (1928–1943); Karl Gerland from 6 November 1943
14	Magdeburg-Anhalt, renaming of Gau Anhalt-Provinz Sachsen Nord 1 October 1928	Dessau	13,910	1,820,416	Gustav Hermann Schmischke (1926–1927); Wilhelm Friedrich Loeper (1927–1935) with a short replacement by Paul Hofmann from August to December 1932; Joachim Albrecht Eggeling (1935–1937); Rudolf Jordan from 20 April 1937
15	Mainfranken, renaming of Gau Unterfranken 30 July 1935	Würzburg	8,432	840,663	Otto Hellmuth from 1 October 1928
16	Mark Brandenburg, renaming of Gau Kurmark 1 January 1939	Berlin	38,278	3,007,933	Wilhelm Kube (1933–1936); Emil Stürtz from 7 August 1936
17	Mecklenburg, renaming of Gau Mecklenburg-Lübeck 1 April 1937	Schwerin	15,722	900,427	Friedrich Hildebrandt from 1925 with a short replacement by Herbert Albrecht (July 1930 – January 1931)
18	Moselland	Koblenz	11,876	1,367,354	Gustav Simon from 24 January 1941
19	München-Oberbayern	Munich	16,411	1,938,447	Adolf Wagner (1930–1944); Paul Giesler from 12 April 1944
20	Niederdonau, renaming of Gau Niederösterreich 21 May 1938	Nominal capital: Krems, District Headquarters: Vienna	23,502	1,697,676	Leopold Eder (1926–1927); Josef Leopold (1927–1938); Hugo Jury from 21 May 1938
21	Niederschlesien	Breslau	26,985	3,286,539	Karl Hanke from 27 January 1941
22	Oberdonau, renaming of Gau Oberösterreich 22 May 1938	Linz	14,216	1,034,871	Alfred Proksch (1926–1927); Andreas Bolek (1927–1934); Rudolf Lengauer (1934–1935); Oscar Hinterleitner (1935); August Eigruber from 22 May 1938
23	Oberschlesien	Kattowitz	20,636	4,341,084	Fritz Bracht from 27 January 1941
24	Ost-Hannover, renaming of Gau Lüneburg-Stade 1 October 1928	Buchholz, after 1 April 1937 Lüneburg	18,006	1,060,509	Otto Telschow from 27 March 1925
25	Ostpreußen	Königsberg	52,731	3,336,777	Wilhelm Stich (1925–1926); Bruno Gustav Scherwitz (1926–1927); Hans Albert Hohnfeldt (1927–1928); Erich Koch from 1 October 1928
26	Pommern	Stettin	38,409	2,393,844	Theodor Vahlen (1925–1927); Walther von Corswant (1927–1931); Wilhelm Karpenstein (1931–1934); Franz Schwede-Coburg from 21 July 1934
27	Sachsen	Dresden	14,995	5,231,739	Martin Mutschmann from 27 March 1925
28	Salzburg	Salzburg	7,153	257,226	Karl Scharizer (1932–1934); Anton Wintersteiger (1934–1938); Friedrich Rainer (1938–1941); Gustav Adolf Scheel from 27 November 1941
29	Schleswig-Holstein	Kiel	15,687	1,589,267	Hinrich Lohse from 27 March 1925
30	Schwaben	Augsburg	10,231	946,212	Karl Wahl from 1 October 1928
31	Steiermark	Graz	17,384	1,116,407	Walther Oberhaidacher (1928–1934); Georg Bilgeri (1934–1935); Sepp Helfrich (1936–1938); Siegfried Uiberreither from 25 May 1938
32	Sudetenland (also known as Sudetengau)	Reichenberg	22,608	2,943,187	Konrad Henlein from 1 October 1938
33	Südhannover-Braunschweig	Hannover	14,553	2,136,961	Bernhard Rust (1928–1940); Hartmann Lauterbacher from 8 December 1940
34	Thüringen	Weimar	15,763	2,446,182	Artur Dinter (1925–1927); Fritz Sauckel from 30 September 1927
35	Tirol-Vorarlberg	Innsbruck	13,126	486,400	Franz Hofer from 25 May 1938
36	Wartheland (also known as Warthegau), renaming of Gau Posen (29 January 1940)	Posen	43,905	4,693,722	Arthur Karl Greiser from 21 October 1939
37	Weser-Ems	Oldenburg	15,044	1,839,302	Carl Röver (1928–1942); Paul Wegener from 26 May 1942
38	Westfalen-Nord	Münster	14,559	2,822,603	Alfred Meyer from 31 January 1931
39	Westfalen-Süd	Bochum	7,656	2,678,026	Josef Wagner (1931–1941); Paul Giesler (1941–1943); Albert Hoffmann from 26 January 1943
40	Westmark	Saarbrücken	14,713	1,892,240	Josef Bürckel (1940–1944); Willi Stöhr from 29 September 1944
41	Wien	Vienna	1,216	1,929,976	Walter Rentmeister (1926–1928); Eugen Werkowitsch (1928–1929); Robert Derda (1929); Alfred Frauenfeld (1930–1933); Leopold Tavs (1937–1938); Odilo Globocnik (1938–1939); Josef Bürckel (1939–1940); Baldur von Schirach from 8 August 1940
42	Württemberg-Hohenzollern	Stuttgart	20,657	2,974,373	Eugen Munder (1925–1928); Wilhelm Murr from 1 February 1928
43	Auslandsorganisation (also known as NSDAP/AO)	Berlin			Hans Nieland (1932–1933); Ernst Wilhelm Bohle from 17 February 1934

Later Gaue:

- Flanders, existed from 15 December 1944 (Gauleiter in German exile: Jef van de Wiele)
- Wallonia, existed from 8 December 1944 (Gauleiter in German exile: Léon Degrelle)

=== Gaue dissolved before 1945 ===
The numbering is not based on any official former ranking, but merely listed alphabetically. Gaue that were simply renamed without territorial changes bear the designation RN in the column "later became." Gaue that were divided into more than one Gau bear the designation D in the column "later became." Gaue that were merged with other Gaue (or occupied territory) bear the designation M in the column "together with."

Nr.	Gau	in existence	later became	together with	Gauleiter
01	Anhalt	1925–1926	Anhalt-Provinz Sachsen Nord (1 September 1926)	Magdeburg & Elbe-Havel M	from 17 July 1925 to 1 September 1926 Gustav Hermann Schmischke
02	Anhalt-Provinz Sachsen Nord	1926–1928	Magdeburg-Anhalt (1 October 1928) RN		see above table
03	Baden	1925–1941	Baden-Elsaß (22 March 1941)	Alsace M	from 25 March 1925 to 22 March 1941 Robert Heinrich Wagner
04	Bayerische Ostmark	1933–1942	Bayreuth (2 June 1942) RN		see above table
05	Berlin-Brandenburg	1926–1928	Berlin & Brandenburg (II) (1 October 1928) D		from 26 October 1926 to 1 October 1928 Joseph Goebbels
06	Brandenburg (I)	1925–1926	Potsdam (February 1926) RN		from 5 November 1925 to February 1926 Walter Klaunig
07	Brandenburg (II)	1928–1933	Kurmark (6 March 1933)	Ostmark M	from 1 October 1928 to 1930 Emil Holtz, then from 18 October 1930 to 16 March 1933 Ernst Schlange
08	Burgenland	1935–1938	Niederdonau & Steiermark (1 October 1938) D		from May 1935 to 1 October 1938 Tobias Portschy
09	Danzig	1926–1939	Danzig-Westpreußen (10 October 1939)	Westpreußen M	from 11 March 1926 to 20 June 1928 Hans Albert Hohnfeldt, then from 20 August 1928 to 1 March 1929 Walter Maass, then from 1 March 1929 to 30 September 1930 Erich Koch, then from 15 October 1930 to 10 October 1939 Albert Forster
10	Elbe-Havel	1925–1926	Anhalt-Provinz Sachsen Nord (1 September 1926)	Anhalt & Magdeburg M	from 25 November 1925 to 1 September 1926 Alois Bachschmid
11	Göttingen	1925	Hannover-Süd (December 1925) RN		from 27 March 1925 to December 1925 Ludolf Haase
12	Groß-Berlin	1925–1926	Berlin-Brandenburg (26 October 1926)	Potsdam M	from 27 March 1925 to 20 June 1926 Ernst Schlange, then from 20 June 1926 to 26 October 1926 Erich Schmiedicke
13	Groß-München ("Traditionsgau")	1929–1930	München-Oberbayern (15 November 1930)	Oberbayern M	from 1 November 1929 to 15 November 1930 Adolf Wagner
14	Hannover-Braunschweig	1925	Hannover-Nord (December 1925) RN		from 22 March 1925 to December 1925 Bernhard Rust
15	Hannover-Nord	1925–1928	Süd-Hannover-Braunschweig & Weser Ems (1 October 1928) D		from December 1925 to 30 September 1928 Bernhard Rust
16	Hannover-Süd	1925–1928	Süd-Hannover-Braunschweig (1 October 1928)	Hannover-Nord M	from December 1925 to 30 September 1928 Ludolf Haase
17	Harzgau	1925–1926	Magdeburg (April 1926) RN		from August 1925 to April 1926 Ludwig Viereck
18	Hessen-Darmstadt	1927–1933	Hessen-Nassau (1 January 1933)	Hessen-Nassau-Süd M	from 1 March 1927 to 9 January 1931 Friedrich Ringshausen, then Peter Gemeinder to 30 August 1931, then Karl Lenz to 15 December 1932
19	Hessen-Nassau-Nord	1925–1934	Kurhessen (1934) RN		see above table
20	Hessen-Nassau-Süd	1925–1932	Hessen-Nassau (1 January 1933)	Hessen-Darmstadt M	from 1 April 1925 to 22 September 1926 Anton Haselmayer, then from 1 October 1926 to 1 April 1927 Karl Linder, then from 1 April 1927 to 1 January 1933 Jakob Sprenger with a short replacement by Karl Linder (August 1932 – December 1932)
21	Koblenz-Trier	1931–1941	Moselland (24 January 1941)	Luxembourg M	from 1 June 1931 to 24 January 1941 Gustav Simon
22	Köln	1925	Rhineland-Süd (27 March 1925) RN		from 22 February 1925 to 27 March 1925 Heinrich Haake
23	Kurmark	1933–1939	Mark Brandenburg (1 January 1939) RN		see above table
24	Lüneburg-Stade	1925–1928	Ost-Hannover (1 October 1928) RN		see above table
25	Magdeburg	1926	Anhalt-Provinz Sachsen Nord (1 September 1926)	Anhalt & Elbe-Havel M	from April 1926 to 1 September 1926 Ludwig Viereck
26	Mecklenburg-Lübeck	1925– 1937	Mecklenburg (1 April 1937) RN		see above table
27	Mittelfranken	1929–1933	Franken (21 April 1933) RN		see above table
28	Mittelfranken-West	1928–1929	Mittelfranken (1 March 1929)	Nürnburg-Fürth-Erlangen M	from 1 October 1928 to 1 March 1929 Wilhelm Grimm
29	Niederbayern (I)	1925–1926	Niederbayern-Oberpfalz (I) (December 1926)	Oberpfalz (I) M	from February 1925 to December 1926 Gregor Strasser
30	Niederbayern (II)	1928–1932	Niederbayern-Oberpfalz (II) (1 April 1932)	Oberpfalz (II) M	from 1 October 1928 to 1 March 1929 Gregor Strasser, then from 1 March 1929 to 1 April 1932 Otto Erbersdobler, then from 1 April 1932 to 17 August 1932 Franz Maierhofer
31	Niederbayern-Oberpfalz (I)	1926–1928	Oberpfalz (II) & Niederbayern (II) (1 October 1928) D		from December 1926 to 1 October 1928 Gregor Strasser
32	Niederbayern-Oberpfalz (II)	1932–1933	Bayerische Ostmark (19 January 1933)	Oberfranken M	from 17 August 1932 to 13 January 1933 Franz Maierhofer
33	Niederösterreich	1926–1938	Niederdonau (21 May 1938) RN		see above table
34	Nordbayern	1925–1928	Mittelfranken-West, Nürnburg-Fürth, Oberfranken & Unterfranken (1 October 1928) D		from 2 April 1925 to 1 October 1928 Julius Streicher
35	Nürnburg-Fürth-Erlangen	1925–1929	Mittelfranken (1 March 1929)	Mittelfranken-West M	from 2 April 1925 to 1 March 1929 Julius Streicher
36	Oberbayern	1928–1930	München-Oberbayern (15 November 1930)	Groß-München M	from 1 October 1928 to 1 November 1930 Fritz Reinhardt
37	Oberbayern-Schwaben	1926–1928	Oberbayern & Schwaben (1 October 1928) D		from 16 September 1926 to May 1927 Hermann Esser, then from 1 June 1928 to 1 October 1928 Fritz Reinhardt
38	Oberfranken	1929–1933	Bayerische Ostmark (19 January 1933)	Niederbayern-Oberpfalz (II) M	from 1 March 1929 to 19 January 1933 Hans Schemm
39	Oberösterreich	1926–1938	Oberdonau (22 May 1938) RN		see above table
40	Oberpfalz (I)	1925–1926	Niederbayern-Oberpfalz (I) (December 1926)	Niederbayern (I) M	unknown
41	Oberpfalz (II)	1928–1932	Niederbayern-Oberpfalz (II) (17 August 1932)	Niederbayern (II) M	from 1 October 1928 to 1 November 1929 Adolf Wagner, then from 1 November 1929 to June 1930 Franz Maierhofer, then from June 1930 to November 1930 Edmund Heines, then from 15 November 1930 to 17 August 1932 Franz Maierhofer
42	Ostmark	1928–1933	Kurmark (6 March 1933)	Brandenburg (II) M	from 2 January 1928 to 6 March 1933 Wilhelm Kube
43	Ostsachsen	1925–1926	Sachsen ( 16 May 1926)	Sachsen M	from 22 May 1925 to 16 May 1926 Anton Goss
44	Pfalz-Saar	1935–1936	Saarpfalz (13 January 1936) RN		from 1 March 1935 to 13 January 1936 Josef Bürckel
45	Posen	1939–1940	Wartheland (29 January 1940) RN		see above table
46	Potsdam	1926	Berlin-Brandenburg (26 October 1926)	Groß-Berlin M	from February to June 1926 Walter Klaunig
47	Rheinland	1926–1931	Köln-Aachen & Koblenz-Trier (1 June 1931) D		from July 1926 to 1 June 1931 Robert Ley
48	Rheinland-Nord	1925–1926	Ruhr (7 March 1926)	Westfalen (I) M	from March 1925 to July 1925 Axel Ripke, then from July 1925 to 7 March 1926 Karl Kaufmann
49	Rheinland-Süd	1925–1926	Rhineland (July 1926) RN		27 March 1925 to 1 June 1925 Heinrich Haake, then from July 1925 to July 1926 Robert Ley
50	Rheinpfalz	1925–1935	Pfalz-Saar (1 March 1935)	Saar M	from February 1925 to 13 March 1926 Friedrich Wambsganss, then from February 1926 to 1 March 1935 Josef Bürckel
51	Rhein-Ruhr	1926	Ruhr (July 1926) RN		from 7 March 1926 to 20 June 1926 Karl Kaufmann
52	Ruhr ("Großgau Ruhr")	1926–1928	Düsseldorf, Essen & Westfalen (II) (1 October 1928) D		from 20 June 1926 to 1 October 1928 Karl Kaufmann
53	Saar	1926–1935	Pfalz-Saar (1 March 1935)	Rheinpfalz M	from 30 May 1926 to 8 December 1926 Walter Jung, then from 8 December 1926 to 21 April 1929 Jakob Jung, then from 21 April 1929 to 30 July 1929 Gustav Staebe (acting), then from 30 July 1929 to 1 September 1931 Adolf Ehrecke, then from 15 September 1931 to 6 May 1933 Karl Brück, then from 6 May 1933 to 1 March 1935 Josef Bürckel
54	Saarpfalz	1936–1940	Westmark (7 December 1940)	Lorraine M	from 13 January 1936 to 7 December 1940 Josef Bürckel
55	Schlesien	1935–1941	Niederschlesien & Oberschlesien (27 January 1941) D		from 15 March 1925 to 4 December 1934 Helmuth Brückner, then from 12 December 1934 to 9 January 1941 Josef Wagner
56	Tirol	1932–1938	Tirol-Vorarlberg (22 May 1938)	Vorarlberg M	from 1 November 1932 to July 1934 Franz Hofer, then from 28 July 1934 to 1 February 1935 Friedrich Plattner, then from 15 August 1935 to 11 March 1938 Edmund Christoph
57	Unterfranken	1928–1935	Mainfranken (30 July 1935) RN		see above table
58	Vorarlberg	1932–1938	Tirol-Vorarlberg (22 May 1938)	Tirol M	from 12 March 1938 to 22 May 1938 Anton Plankensteiner
59	Westfalen (I)	1925–1926	Ruhr (7 March 1926)	Rheinland-Nord M	from 27 March 1925 to 7 March 1926 Franz Pfeffer von Salomon
60	Westfalen (II)	1928–1931	Westfalen-Nord & Westfalen-Süd (1 January 1931) D		from 1 October 1928 to 1 January 1931 Josef Wagner
61	Westgau	1928–1932	Salzburg, Tirol & Vorarlberg (1 July 1932) D		from 1 October 1928 to 1931 Heinrich Suske, then from 1931 to 1 July 1932 Rudolf Riedel

=== Associated organisations abroad ===
==== Gaue in Switzerland ====
The irregular Swiss branch of the Nazi Party also established a number of Party Gaue in that country, most of them named after their regional capitals. These included Gau Basel-Solothurn, Gau Schaffhausen, Gau Luzern, Gau Bern and Gau Zürich. The Gau Ostschweiz (East Switzerland) combined the territories of three cantons: St. Gallen, Thurgau and Appenzell.

== Membership ==
=== General membership ===
The general membership of the Nazi Party mainly consisted of the urban and rural lower middle classes. 7% belonged to the upper class, another 7% were peasants, 35% were industrial workers and 51% were what can be described as middle class. In early 1933, just before Hitler's appointment to the chancellorship, the party showed an under-representation of "workers", who made up 30% of the membership but 46% of German society. Conversely, white-collar employees (19% of members and 12% of Germans), the self-employed (20% of members and 10% of Germans) and civil servants (15% of members and 5% of the German population) had joined in proportions greater than their share of the general population. These members were affiliated with local branches of the party, of which there were 1,378 throughout the country in 1928. In 1932, the number had risen to 11,845, reflecting the party's growth in this period.

When it came to power in 1933, the Nazi Party had over 2 million members. In 1939, the membership total rose to 5.3 million with 81% being male and 19% being female. It continued to attract many more and by 1945 the party reached its peak of 8 million with 63% being male and 37% being female (about 10% of the German population of 80 million).

=== Military membership ===
Nazi members with military ambitions were encouraged to join the Waffen-SS, but a great number enlisted in the Wehrmacht and even more were drafted for service after World War II began. Early regulations required that all Wehrmacht members be non-political and any Nazi member joining in the 1930s was required to resign from the Nazi Party.

However, this regulation was soon waived and full Nazi Party members served in the Wehrmacht in particular after the outbreak of World War II. The Wehrmacht Reserves also saw a high number of senior Nazis enlisting, with Reinhard Heydrich and Fritz Todt joining the Luftwaffe, as well as Karl Hanke who served in the army.

The British historian Richard J. Evans wrote that junior officers in the army were inclined to be especially zealous National Socialists with a third of them having joined the Nazi Party by 1941. Reinforcing the work of the junior leaders were the National Socialist Leadership Guidance Officers, which were created with the purpose of indoctrinating the troops for the "war of extermination" against Soviet Russia. Among higher-ranking officers, 29% were NSDAP members by 1941.

=== Student membership ===
In 1926, the party formed a special division to engage the student population, known as the National Socialist German Students' League (NSDStB). A group for university lecturers, the National Socialist German University Lecturers' League (NSDDB), also existed until July 1944.

=== Women membership ===
The National Socialist Women's League was the women's organization of the party and by 1938 it had approximately 2 million members.

=== Membership outside Germany ===
Party members who lived outside Germany were pooled into the Auslands-Organisation (NSDAP/AO, "Foreign Organization"). The organisation was limited only to so-called "Imperial Germans" (citizens of the German Empire); and "Ethnic Germans" (Volksdeutsche), who did not hold German citizenship were not permitted to join.

Under Beneš decree No. 16/1945 Coll., in case of citizens of Czechoslovakia membership of the Nazi Party was punishable by between five and twenty years of imprisonment.

==== Deutsche Gemeinschaft ====
Deutsche Gemeinschaft was a branch of the Nazi Party founded in 1919, created for Germans with Volksdeutsche status. It is not to be confused with the post-war right-wing Deutsche Gemeinschaft, which was founded in 1949.

Notable members included:

- Oswald Menghin (Vienna)
- Hermann Neubacher who was responsible for invading Yugoslavia.
- Rudolf Much (Vienna)
- Arthur Seyß-Inquart (Vienna)

==== List of wings ====
- Sturmabteilung
- Schutzstaffel
- Motor Corps
- Flyers Corps
- National Socialist League of the Reich for Physical Exercise
- NSDAP/AO (overseas wing)
- National Socialist German Students' Union
- Women's League
- Labour wings:
  - NSBO (1928–35)
  - DAF (1933–45)

== Party symbols ==
- Nazi flags: The Nazi Party used a right-facing swastika as their symbol and the red and black colours were said to represent Blut und Boden ("blood and soil"). Another definition of the flag describes the colours as representing the ideology of National Socialism, the swastika representing the Aryan race and the Aryan nationalist agenda of the movement; white representing Aryan racial purity; and red representing the socialist agenda of the movement. Black, white and red were in fact the colours of the old North German Confederation flag (invented by Otto von Bismarck, based on the Prussian colours black and white and the red used by northern German states). In 1871, with the foundation of the German Reich the flag of the North German Confederation became the German Reichsflagge ("Reich flag"). Black, white and red became the colours of the nationalists through the following history (for example World War I and the Weimar Republic).

The Parteiflagge design, with the centred swastika disc, served as the party flag from 1920. Between 1933 (when the Nazi Party came to power) and 1935, it was used as the National flag (Nationalflagge) and Merchant flag (Handelsflagge), but interchangeably with the black-white-red horizontal tricolour. In 1935, the black-white-red horizontal tricolour was scrapped (again) and the flag with the off-centre swastika and disc was instituted as the national flag, and remained as such until 1945. The flag with the centred disk continued to be used after 1935, but exclusively as the Parteiflagge, the flag of the party.

- German eagle: The Nazi Party used the traditional German eagle, standing atop a swastika inside a wreath of oak leaves. It is also known as the "Iron Eagle". When the eagle is looking to its left shoulder, it symbolises the Nazi Party and was called the Parteiadler. In contrast, when the eagle is looking to its right shoulder, it symbolises the country (Reich) and was therefore called the Reichsadler. After the Nazi Party came to national power in Germany, they replaced the traditional version of the German eagle with the modified party symbol throughout the country and all its institutions.

== Ranks and rank insignia ==
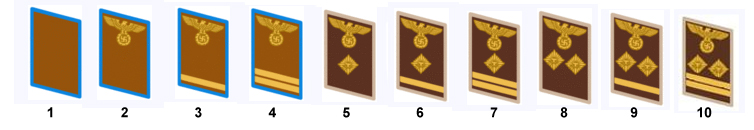
1: Anwärter (not party member), 2: Anwärter, 3: Helfer, 4: Oberhelfer, 5: Arbeitsleiter, 6: Oberarbeitsleiter, 7: Hauptarbeitsleiter, 8: Bereitschaftsleiter, 9: Oberbereitschaftsleiter, 10: Hauptbereitschaftsleiter

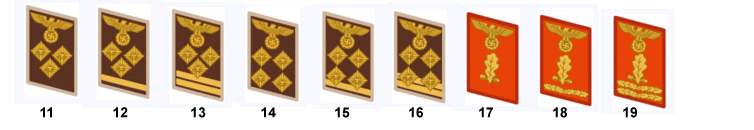
11: Einsatzleiter, 12: Obereinsatzleiter, 13: Haupteinsatzleiter, 14: Gemeinschaftsleiter, 15: Obergemeinschaftsleiter, 16: Hauptgemeinschaftsleiter, 17: Abschnittsleiter, 18: Oberabschnittsleiter, 19: Hauptabschnittsleiter

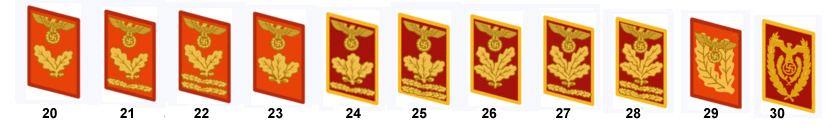
20: Bereichsleiter, 21: Oberbereichsleiter, 22: Hauptbereichsleiter, 23: Dienstleiter, 24: Oberdienstleiter, 25: Hauptdienstleiter, 26: Befehlsleiter, 27: Oberbefehlsleiter, 28: Hauptbefehlsleiter, 29: Gauleiter, 30: Reichsleiter

== Slogans and songs ==
- Slogans: "Sieg Heil!"; "Heil Hitler"
- Anthem: Horst-Wessel-Lied

== Election results ==
=== German Reichstag ===
Election year	Votes	%	Seats won	+/–	Notes
1928	810,127	2.6	12 / 491	▲12	
1930	6,379,672	18.3	107 / 577	▲95	
July 1932	13,745,680	37.3	230 / 608	▲123	
November 1932	11,737,021	33.1	196 / 584	▼34	Last free and fair election.
March 1933	17,277,180	43.9	288 / 647	▲92	Semi-free yet questionable election. Last multi-party contested election.
November 1933	39,655,224	92.1	661 / 661	▲373	Sole legal party.
1936	44,462,458	98.8	741 / 741	▲80	Sole legal party.
1938	44,451,092	99.0	813 / 813	▲72	Sole legal party.

=== Presidential election ===
Election year	Candidate	First round			Second round		
Election year	Candidate	Votes	%	Place	Votes	%	Place
1925	endorsed Ludendorff (1.1%)				endorsed Hindenburg (48.3%)		
1932	Adolf Hitler	11,339,446	30.1	2nd	13,418,547	36.8	2nd

=== Volkstag of Danzig ===
Election year	Votes	%	Seats won	+/–
1927	1,483	0.8	1 / 72	▲1
1930	32,457	16.4	12 / 72	▲11
1933	107,331	50.1	38 / 72	▲26
1935	139,423	59.3	43 / 72	▲5

== See also ==
- Business collaboration with Nazi Germany
- Collaboration with Nazi Germany and Fascist Italy
- Glossary of Nazi Germany
- List of books about Nazi Germany
- List of companies involved in the Holocaust
- List of Nazi Party leaders and officials
- Mass suicides in 1945 Nazi Germany
- Neo-Nazism
- Political parties whose policies involve antisemitism
- Socialist Reich Party
- Volkssturm
