= Franz Maierhofer =

German Nazi Party official (1897–1943)

Gauleiter of Lower Bavaria-Upper Palatinate
- In office 17 August 1932 – 13 January 1933
- Preceded by: Position created
- Succeeded by: Position abolished
- Gauleiter of Lower Bavaria
- In office 1 April 1932 – 17 August 1932
- Preceded by: Otto Erbersdobler
- Succeeded by: Position abolished

Gauleiter of Upper Palatinate
- In office 15 November 1930 – 17 August 1932
- Preceded by: Edmund Heines
- Succeeded by: Position abolished

Deputy Gauleiter of Upper Palatinate
- In office 1929 – 15 November 1930

Personal details
- Born: 21 December 1897 Rosenheim, Kingdom of Bavaria, German Empire
- Died: 22 August 1943 (aged 45) Kharkov, Soviet Union
- Cause of death: Killed in action
- Party: Nazi Party
- Occupation: Teacher
- Civilian awards: Golden Party Badge

Military service
- Allegiance: German Empire; Nazi Germany
- Branch/service: Royal Bavarian Army; German Army
- Years of service: 1914–1920; 1937–1943
- Rank: Leutnant; Major
- Unit: 11th Royal Bavarian Infantry Regiment; 10th Royal Bavarian Infantry Regiment; Infantry Regiment 50
- Commands: 2nd Battalion, Grenadier Regiment 315
- Battles/wars: World War I World War II • Fourth Battle of Kharkov †
- Military awards: German Cross in gold Clasp to the Iron Cross, 1st and 2nd class Iron Cross, 1st and 2nd class Bavarian Military Merit Order, 4th class with swords

Franz Maierhofer (21 December 1897 – 22 August 1943) was a German school teacher who became the Gauleiter of the Nazi Party for the Upper Palatinate and Lower Bavaria. He was also a member of the Schutzstaffel (SS) and the Wehrmacht. He was killed in action on the eastern front in World War II.

== Early years ==
The tenth child of a locomotive operator, Maierhofer grew up in Regensburg and attended the local Volksschule and preparatory school. At the outbreak of World War I in 1914, he enlisted as a one-year volunteer with the 11th Royal Bavarian Infantry Regiment. He attended officer training classes and was promoted to Leutnant in August 1916. Fighting on the western front with the 10th Royal Bavarian Infantry Regiment as a deputy company commander, he was wounded and taken prisoner by the French in April 1917. He was awarded the Iron Cross, first and second class and the Bavarian Military Merit Order, 4th class with swords.

After the end of the war, he was returned to Germany in April 1920, and was discharged from the service with a 20 percent disability. He resumed his education, training as an elementary school teacher in Amberg from 1920 to 1922. He passed his teaching examinations in December 1922. In 1923, he became an assistant teacher and, in 1925, he was employed as a teacher. In 1930, he took up a teaching position in Auerbach in the Upper Palatinate (Oberpfalz). He was dismissed from public school service on 1 November 1932 due to his political activities.

== Nazi career ==
On 16 April 1927, Maierhofer joined the Nazi Party (membership number 59,524). As an early Party member, he was considered an Alte Kämpfer and was later awarded the Golden Party Badge. He served as Bezirksleiter (district leader) in Auerbach from 1927, and was a member of the Sturmabteilung (SA) from April 1927 to November 1929. In 1929, he was named Deputy Gauleiter of the Upper Palatinate, and when Gauleiter Adolf Wagner was transferred to Greater Munich in November, Maierhofer administered the Gau until June 1930 when Edmund Heines came in as acting Gauleiter. When Heines left to take up a staff position in the SA high command, Maierhofer was named Gauleiter of the Upper Palatinate on 15 November 1930. In September 1930, he was elected to the Reichstag from electoral constituency 25 (Lower Bavaria–Upper Palatinate) but served only one term until the next election in July 1932. In April 1931, he became the editor of a Nazi daily newspaper Schaffendes Volk (Working People).

On the resignation of Otto Erbersdobler of the neighboring Gau of Lower Bavaria (Niederbayern) on 1 April 1932, Maierhofer was assigned the leadership of that jurisdiction in addition to his own. On 17 August, the Gaue of Upper Palatinate and Lower Bavaria were formally merged and Maierhofer became Gauleiter of the newly named Gau Lower Bavaria-Upper Palatinate (Niederbayern-Oberpfalz). However just several months later, the SA leadership of the Gau filed a complaint alleging that Maierhofer had not properly allocated money due to the SA. He was relieved of his office on 13 January 1933. On 19 January, his Gau was merged with Upper Franconia into Gau Bavarian-East March (Bayerische Ostmark) under the leadership of Hans Schemm, the Upper Franconian Gauleiter.

In November 1933, Maierhofer joined the Schutzstaffel (SS) and held several staff positions between 1935 and 1937, including on the staff of the Reichsführer-SS. On 20 April 1936, he attained the rank of SS-Obersturmbannführer and, in April 1938, he was assigned to the SS-Oberabschnitt "Süd" in Munich. In October 1937, he secured a position with the Bavarian state government as an advisor in the Ministry of Education and Culture under Adolf Wagner. He unsuccessfully sought to obtain a seat in the Reichstag at the elections of March 1936 and April 1938.

== Military service and death in World War II ==
In May 1937, Maierhofer reentered military service as a Leutnant of reserves. At the outbreak of World War II in September 1939, he served on active duty with Infantry Regiment 50 of the 3rd Infantry Division. After June 1941, he saw action on the eastern front and earned the Clasp to the Iron Cross, 1st and 2nd class. He advanced to the rank of Hauptmann in July 1942 and was awarded the German Cross in Gold. He became a battalion commander in Grenadier Regiment 315 of the 167th Infantry Division, and was promoted to Major on 1 February 1943. Maierhofer was killed in action at the Fourth Battle of Kharkov on 22 August 1943.

== Sources ==
- Höffkes, Karl (1986). Hitlers Politische Generale. Die Gauleiter des Dritten Reiches: ein biographisches Nachschlagewerk. Tübingen: Grabert-Verlag. ISBN 3-87847-163-7.
- Franz Maierhofer biography in the Reicgstag Members Database
- Miller, Michael D.; Schulz, Andreas (2017). Gauleiter: The Regional Leaders of the Nazi Party and Their Deputies, 1925-1945. Vol. II (Georg Joel – Dr. Bernhard Rust). R. James Bender Publishing. ISBN 978-1-932970-32-6.
