= Otto Erbersdobler =

Nazi Party official (1895–1981)

Gauleiter of Lower Bavaria
- In office 1 March 1929 – 1 April 1932
- Preceded by: Gregor Strasser
- Succeeded by: Franz Maierhofer
- Deputy Gauleiter of Lower Bavaria-Upper Palatinate
- In office 17 August 1932 – 19 January 1933
- Preceded by: Position created
- Succeeded by: Position abolished

President, Lower Bavarian Chamber of Industry and Trade
- In office 20 June 1933 – 31 March 1943

Kreisleiter of Kreis Landshut-Vilsbiburg
- In office 6 March 1942 – 8 May 1945

Personal details
- Born: 30 April 1895 Fürstenzell, Kingdom of Bavaria, German Empire
- Died: 25 October 1981 (aged 86) Fürstenzell, Bavaria, West Germany
- Party: Nazi Party
- Other political affiliations: Völkisch-Social Bloc

Military service
- Allegiance: German Empire
- Branch/service: Imperial German Army
- Years of service: 1915–1918
- Rank: Vizefeldwebel
- Battles/wars: World War I
- Awards: Iron Cross; Bavarian Military Merit Cross

Otto Erbersdobler (30 April 1895 – 25 October 1981) was a Nazi Party (NSDAP) official who served as the Gauleiter of Lower Bavaria from 1929 to 1932.

== Early years ==
Erbersdobler was born in Fürstenzell, the son of an estate owner and founder/owner of a granite and brick works. He attended Volksschule in Fürstenzell and Realschule in Passau. He then worked as an apprentice in brick works, granite works and agriculture in his parents' and other companies.

From May 1915 to December 1918, Erbersdobler took part in World War I as a member of the Bavarian 15th Infantry Regiment. During the war he was awarded the Iron Cross, first and second class, and the Bavarian Military Merit Cross. He was discharged from military service as a Vizefeldwebel in the Reserves. After the war, he again worked in the field and then as an office manager in his parents' brick and stone quarry. Erbersdobler joined the Nazi Party in October 1923, shortly before the party was banned as a result of the Beer Hall Putsch. He then served as an Ortsgruppenleiter (Local Group Leader) in his hometown for the Völkisch-Social Bloc, a Nazi front organization active during the ban.

== Nazi career ==
Erbersdobler rejoined the NSDAP on 27 February 1925 (membership number 14,607), just as soon as the party was again legalized. He became an Ortsgruppenleiter in Fürstenzell and briefly in Bayreuth. In 1927, he advanced to Kreisleiter (County Leader) and, in 1928, to Bezirksleiter (District Leader). In 1929, he was elected to the Bezirkstag (District Assembly) in Passau. On 1 March 1929, Erbersdobler succeeded Gregor Strasser as Gauleiter for the Gau of Lower Bavaria. Also in 1929, he was appointed a Reichsredner (national speaker) and was engaged in propaganda work.

On 1 April 1932, Erbersdobler was replaced as Gauleiter of Lower Bavaria by the Gauleiter of the Upper Palatinate, Franz Maierhofer. When the two jurisdictions formally merged into Gau Lower Bavaria-Upper Palatinate on 17 August 1932, Erbersdobler served as Deputy Gauleiter under Maierhofer until 19 January 1933. In July 1932, Erbersdobler was elected to the Reichstag from electoral constituency 25 (Lower Bavaria–Upper Palatinate). After the temporary loss of his seat in the November 1932 election, Erbersdobler returned to parliament in the March 1933 election and subsequently served for the entire duration of Nazi rule until May 1945.

From 20 June 1933 to 31 March 1943, Erbersdobler was President of the Passau Chamber of Industry and Trade. He also served as Deputy President of the District Council of Lower Bavaria-Upper Palatinate. In addition, he also held several positions in the Gau Bavarian Eastern March in Bayreuth, including Deputy Economic Advisor, Gau Training Administrator for the German Labour Front (DAF), and Gau Department Head for Local Politics. On 6 March 1942, he was appointed Gauinspekteur, as well as Kreisleiter of Kreis Landshut-Vilsbiburg for the duration of the war.

Erbersdobler also served in the Sturmabteilung (SA), attaining the rank of SA-Sturmhauptführer. Around 1935, he worked as an ideological advisor in an SA Brigade. In December 1935, Erbersdobler switched from the SA to the National Socialist Motor Corps (NSKK), where he served as the Liaison Leader for Ideological Indoctrination in the Motorbrigade of Gau Bavarian Eastern March. He was promoted to NSKK-Standartenführer on 20 April 1943.

Little is known about Erbersdobler's life after the end of the war. He died in Fürstenzell in 1981.

== Sources ==
- Höffkes, Karl (1986). Hitlers Politische Generale. Die Gauleiter des Dritten Reiches: ein biographisches Nachschlagewerk. Tübingen: Grabert-Verlag. ISBN 3-87847-163-7.
- Miller, Michael D.; Schulz, Andreas (2012). Gauleiter: The Regional Leaders of the Nazi Party and Their Deputies, 1925-1945. Vol. I (Herbert Albrecht - H. Wilhelm Hüttmann). R. James Bender Publishing. ISBN 978-1-932970-21-0.
