= Otto Hellmuth =

German politician and Nazi Party official (1896–1968)

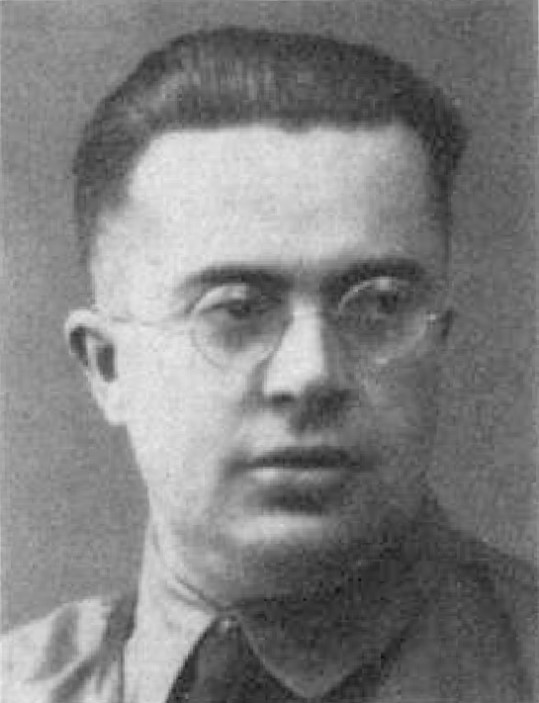
- Otto Hellmuth

Gauleiter of Gau Mainfranken
- In office 1 October 1928 – 8 May 1945
- Appointed by: Adolf Hitler
- Deputy: Wilhelm Kühnreich
- Preceded by: Position created
- Succeeded by: Position abolished

Regierungsprasident of Lower Franconia
- In office 1 July 1934 – 8 May 1945

Personal details
- Born: 22 July 1896 Markt Einersheim, Bavaria, German Empire
- Died: 20 April 1968 (aged 71) Reutlingen, West Germany
- Party: Nazi Party
- Education: University of Würzburg.
- Profession: Dentist

Otto Hellmuth (22 July 1896 – 20 April 1968) was a member of the Nazi Party and the Gauleiter in Lower Franconia (Unterfranken) from 1928 to 1945.

== Early life ==
Born at Markt Einersheim, Hellmuth attended Volksschule and Realschule between 1902 and 1914. On the outbreak of World War I, he entered service as a Kriegsfreiwilliger (war volunteer) in the Bavarian Army, assigned successively to Infantry Regiment 9, Reserve Infantry Regiment 4 and Landwehr Infantry Regiment 8. He was wounded in action four times. He returned to Germany in October 1918 after being severely gassed. Hellmuth then studied dentistry at the University of Freiburg and the University of Würzburg. Between 1919 and 1922, he was active in distributing leaflets for the Deutschvölkischer Schutz- und Trutzbund, the largest and most active antisemitic organization in Germany. He received his doctorate in 1922 and began practice as a dentist.

== Nazi Party career ==
Hellmuth joined the Nazi Party in 1922 before it was outlawed and re-joined in December 1925. He served as an Ortsgruppenleiter in Würzburg and joined the municipal council in Marktbreit. On 20 May 1928, Hellmuth was elected to the Bavarian Landtag. On 1 October 1928, Hellmuth was appointed Gauleiter of Lower Franconia (Gau Unterfranken). His home and office were in Würzburg the capital. Three weeks before the first nationwide anti-Jewish boycott began in 1933, Hellmuth had already forced the closing of Jewish-owned stores and offices in Würzburg. In April 1929, he organized mass meetings to protest the death of a four-year-old child and alleged in an article in Der Stürmer that the child had been killed by Jews in a ritual murder. These accusations were dismissed after a police investigation.

After the Nazi seizure of power, Hellmuth was elected to the Reichstag on 12 November 1933 from electoral constituency 26, Franconia, and retained this seat until the fall of the Nazi regime. On 1 July 1934, he became Regierungspräsident (Government President) of Unterfranken, thus uniting under his control the highest party and governmental offices in his jurisdiction. He had the Gau renamed Mainfranken on 30 July 1935. On 1 June 1938, the name of the government region was also changed to Mainfranken. After World War II, the region's original name was reinstated. In September 1935, Hellmuth was made a member of the Academy for German Law. Unlike almost all other Gauleiters, Hellmuth did not belong to the SA or the SS. However, on 9 November 1939, he was made an Obergruppenführer in the National Socialist Motor Corps (Nationalsozialistisches Kraftfahrerkorps or NSKK). On 16 November 1942, he was appointed the Reich Defense Commissioner for his Gau.

In 1936 he acquired the house of a Jewish pharmacist as his private residence by compelling the city to purchase it far below its market value. He lived here in great luxury with a large household staff. When the Gaufrauenschaftsleiterin of Mainfranken paid Passau a formal visit, with a delegation of activists, Margarethe Schneider-Reichel presented them with a painting of Hellmuth. Over most of his term, Hellmuth was not an impressive personality. Joseph Goebbels saw him as "a most retiring unassuming Gauleiter in whom one had not too much confidence." However, Hellmuth defended his Gau vigorously for a while in the spring of 1945, as Goebbels noted in his diary on 2 April.

== Aktion T4 complicity ==
During a visit to the Werneck sanatorium and nursing home on 23 September 1940, Hellmuth demanded its immediate evacuation and confiscation. From 3 October to 6 October 1940, a total of 760 patients were removed from the sanatorium, around half of whom were transferred to various euthanasia centers of Aktion T4, where they were murdered. On 24 October 1940, the Werneck sanatorium and nursing home was occupied by "Volksdeutsche".

== Post-war ==
Hellmuth and his family fled Würzburg on 2 April 1945, two days before it fell to US forces. He fled to the Tyrol region of Austria where he was briefly detained by US troops in May. Escaping, he hid out as a farmworker in the Kassel area and then resumed the practice of dentistry under an assumed name. Discovered, he was arrested in May 1947 and accused of complicity in the murders of Allied aircraft pilots. He was tried at Dachau and sentenced to death. This sentence was later commuted to life imprisonment, then further reduced to 20 years. He was released from Landsberg Prison in June 1955, settled in Kassel, and resumed his dental practice.

Hellmuth killed himself on 20 April 1968 in Reutlingen.
