= 1936 German parliamentary election and referendum =

- 29 March 1936

All 741 seats in the Reichstag 371 seats needed for a majority
- Registered: 45,455,217 (▲0.6%)
- Turnout: 99.0% (▲3.7pp)
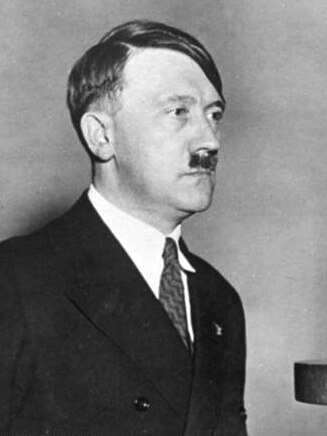
	Majority party
Leader	Adolf Hitler
Party	NSDAP
Last election	92.1%, 661 seats
Seats won	741
Seat change	▲80
Popular vote	44,462,458
Percentage	98.8%
Swing	▲6.7 pp
Government before election
Hitler cabinet
NSDAP
Government after election
Hitler cabinet
NSDAP

Parliamentary elections were held in Germany on 29 March 1936. They took the form of a single-question referendum, asking voters whether they approved of the military occupation of the Rhineland and a single party list for the new Reichstag composed exclusively of Nazis and 19 nominally independent "guests" of the party. The election was effectively rigged, with no political opponents of Hitler allowed to participate with a claimed turnout of 99% and 98.8% voting in favour. In a publicity stunt, a number of voters were packed aboard the airships Graf Zeppelin and Hindenburg, which flew above the Rhineland as those aboard cast their ballots. Despite the electoral irregularities, historian Ian Kershaw writes that the vote nonetheless accurately reflected widespread popular support for Hitler following the remilitarization of the Rhineland.

This was the first German election held after enactment of the 1935 Nuremberg Laws, which had removed citizenship rights (including the right to vote) from Jews and other ethnic minorities. In the previous elections and referendums under Nazi rule, Jews, Poles and other ethnic minorities had been allowed to vote without much interference, and even tacitly encouraged to vote against the Nazis (especially in districts that were known to have large populations of ethnic minorities). On 7 March 1936, Jews and Romani lost their right to vote.

This also was the first election since the Saar was incorporated into Germany on 1 March 1935, following the Saar plebiscite of 13 January 1935. The new territory was merged with electoral constituency 27, Palatinate, which was now renamed Palatinate–Saar.

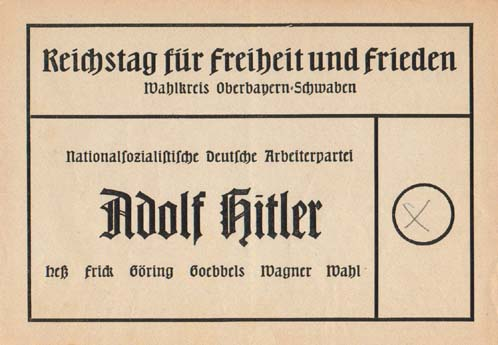
Electoral slip from the constituency of Upper Bavaria–Swabia, Hitler's home constituency, with seven prearranged candidates. (Note: Hitler, Rudolf Hess, Wilhelm Frick, Hermann Göring, Joseph Goebbels, Adolf Wagner, Karl Wahl.) Voters only had to accept or dismiss this option, as no other lists were available.

== Results ==
Party	Votes	%	Seats
Nazi Party and guests	44,462,458	98.80	741
Against	540,244	1.20	–
Invalid/blank votes	540,244	1.20	–
Total votes	45,002,702	100	741
Registered voters/turnout	45,455,217	99.00	–
Source: Nohlen & Stöver

== Aftermath ==
The new Reichstag convened for formulary procedures on 30 January 1937 to re-elect its Presidium and Hermann Göring as President of the Reichstag. It convened again to renew the Enabling Act of 1933 for additional four years.

The subsequent election in 1938 was held both in Germany and Austria, alongside a referendum that ratified the annexation of Austria to the German Reich.

== See also ==
- Guests of the Nazi Party Faction in the Reichstag
- List of Reichstag deputies in the Third Reich (3rd electoral term)
