= Nahe Valley Railway =

Railway line in Germany

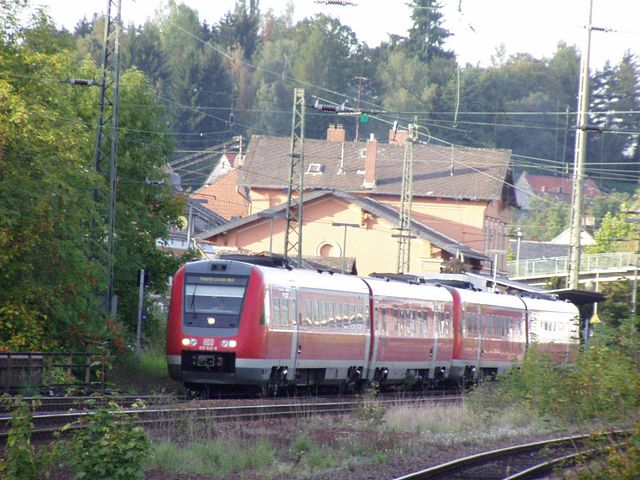
- Coupled Class 612s leave Ottweiler towards Saarbrücken

Overview
- Native name: Nahetalbahn
- Line number: 3511
- Locale: Rhineland-Palatinate and Saarland, Germany
- Termini: Bingen (Rhein) Hbf; Saarbrücken Hbf

Service
- Route number: 672 (Bingen–Bad Kreuznach); 680 (Bad-Kreuznach–Saarbrücken)

Technical
- Line length: 141.8 km (88.1 mi)
- Number of tracks: 2 (throughout)
- Track gauge: 1,435 mm (4 ft 8 1/2 in) standard gauge
- Electrification: 15 kV/16.7 Hz AC overhead catenary
- Operating speed: 160 km/h (99 mph) (max)

The Nahe Valley Railway (German: Nahetalbahn) is a two-track, partially electrified main line railway in the German states of Rhineland-Palatinate and Saarland, which runs for almost 100 kilometres along the Nahe. It was built by the Rhine-Nahe Railway Company and connects Bingen am Rhein on the Left Rhine line with Saarbrücken. It was opened between 1858 and 1860 and is one of the oldest railways in Germany. The section south of Bad Kreuznach is part of the regionally important transport corridor between the two major cities of Mainz and Saarbrücken.

== History ==
=== First initiatives and the opening of the Neunkirchen–Saarbrücken section ===
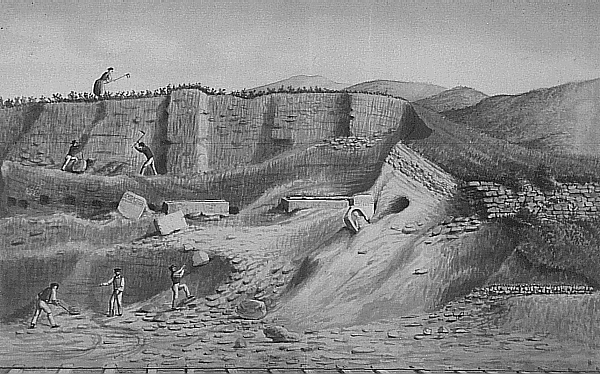
Construction of the Nahe Valley Railway

As early as 1839, there were plans to build a railway connection between the Saar and the Middle Rhine, which could not be realised due to high construction costs.

The first section between Neunkirchen and Saarbrücken was built as continuation of the Palatine Ludwig Railway (Pfälzische Ludwigsbahn, Ludwigshafen–Bexbach), which was completed in 1849 and had already been extended to Neunkirchen in 1850. The main railway was used to transport coal from the Saar district to the Rhine. The Palatine administration originally considered that St. Ingbert, which was in Bavaria, would be at the western end of the line, but this changed under pressure from Prussia. It wanted a connection in the long-term to Saarbrücken that ran only through its own territory and considered the Ludwig Railway should connect with it. For this reason, the line was built to Bexbach, from where it was later extended via Neunkirchen and the Sulzbach valley to Saarbrücken. Prussia also wanted the coal mines in the Holzhauertal and Landsweiler-Reden to be connected to the railway.

The management of the projected line in Prussia was the responsibility of the Royal Saarbrücken Railway (Königlich-Saarbrücker-Eisenbahn), which was also responsible for the Forbach Railway (Forbacher Bahn) from Bexbach via Neunkirchen and Saarbrücken to Forbach in France. The line between Neunkirchen and Saarbrücken was opened in 1852.

=== Formation of the Bingerbrück–Neunkirchen section ===
In 1856 construction of the line was undertaken by the private Rhine-Nahe Railway Company (Rhein-Nahe Eisenbahn-Gesellschaft, RNE) set up for this purpose. It would connect the Nahe Valley and the surrounding area with the Left Rhine line of the Rhenish Railway Company (Rheinischen Eisenbahn-Gesellschaft, RHE) and the Hessian Ludwig Railway (Hessische Ludwigsbahn) in Bingerbrück and would stimulate economic development and open up the market for Saar coal by connecting the Saarland railways with the Middle Rhine Valley. It was proposed that the line be privately financed with a government guarantee of a return of four percent. The Prussian government took control of the project on 18 June 1856 and issued the concession for the railway’s construction and operation to the company on 4 September 1856. The Prussian government required the line to follow the course of the Nahe.

In two places, however, the territory of two other countries had to be crossed: the Herrschaft of Meisenheim, which still belonged to the landgraviate of Hesse-Homburg, and the Principality of Birkenfeld, which was part of the Grand Duchy of Oldenburg. Prussia argued about the route of the line, especially with Oldenburg. While Oldenburg would have liked to see the line pass through the city of Birkenfeld, Prussia insisted on a route through the Nahe valley. At the same time, an initiative from the neighbouring region of the Palatinate for another variant, which would have had the planned route leave the Nahe valley at Staudernheim and run to Altenglan through the Glan and then via Kusel either through St. Wendel or alternatively along the Oster valley. For tactical reasons, Prussia remained open-minded about these efforts, which led to Oldenburg giving way and accepting the route along the Nahe within its territory. After a contract was let for the construction of the line, construction of the 120 km-long single-track line began in 1857.

=== Construction of the line ===
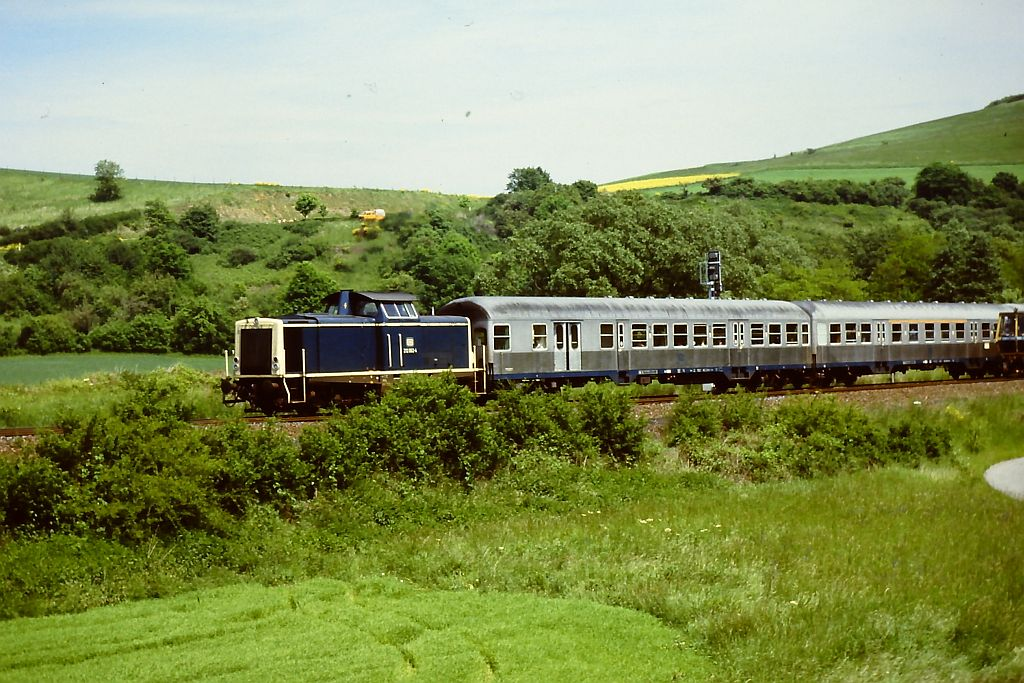
DB local service hauled by diesel locomotive BR 212 062-4 near Staudernheim in 1986

The first 16 km section from Bingerbrück (now Bingen Hauptbahnhof) to Bad Kreuznach went into operation on 15 July 1858. This was followed by the sections to Oberstein on 15 December 1859 and to Neunkirchen (Saar) via Birkenfeld (now Neubrücke) and St. Wendel on 26 May 1860, with a total length of 52 or 53 km. The 21.2 km section to Saarbrücken was completed on 16 November 1852.

Even before the construction the line was finished, the Royal Railway Administration at Saarbrücken (Königliche Eisenbahn-Direction zu Saarbrücken) took over its management and operation. The railway was considered a regional lifeline that would promote industrialisation in this agricultural area of the upper Blies Valley and the Nahe Valley, which was affected by high unemployment, rural exodus and emigration.

The line connected to Bingerbrück on the Rhine and the Hessian Ludwig Railway (Hessische Ludwigsbahn) to Mainz on 17 October 1859 and down the Rhine to the Left Rhine Railway (Linke Rheinstrecke) of the Rhenish Railway Company (Rheinische Eisenbahn-Gesellschaft, RhE) on 15 December 1859. This was followed by a connection with the Hessian Ludwig Railway to Mainz on 15 December 1859. At the beginning of November 1861, this was followed by the opening of the Bingerbrück–Rüdesheim train ferry, connecting to the Nassau Rhine Railway, opened in 1856 by the Wiesbaden Railway Company (Wiesbadener Eisenbahngesellschaft), which was nationalised in 1861 as the Nassau State Railway (Nassauische Staatsbahn).

=== Further development ===
The 121 km-long line of the Rhine-Nahe Railway Company was called by Arthur von Mayer the most expensive line in Germany; this was the result of its very difficult construction, which included a large number of tunnels, bridges, embankments and cuttings. The construction cost more than one million thalers per Prussian mile (7,532.5 metres), then a record sum.

At first, there was a sharp competition with the Palatine Ludwig Railway, since both lines primarily served the transport of Saar coal. In addition, Prussia endeavoured to influence the traffic flows from the north-western Palatinate to the Nahe. For this reason, for example, Heimbach station was built along with a road to the Palatinate town of Kusel. The RNE expressly pointed out that this station was specifically built for this town. The station lost its importance, however, as early as 1868, when the Landstuhl–Kusel railway, which branched off the Ludwig Railway was opened.

The revenue of the company after the start of operations was well short of expectations. Since the passenger traffic met the expectations of the builders only to the spas of Kreuznach and Münster, neither dividends nor interest on debt could be paid. As a result, the Prussian government was obliged to step in to meet its annual interest rate guarantee. This also meant that the government was unable to sell the line to the Rhenish Railway after the War of 1866.

For strategic reasons, a line to Kreuznach was built from Gau Algesheim in 1902, which required a new station to be built. From then on the old Kreuznach station served only as a freight yard.

The Birkenfeld station was five kilometres from the capital of the Principality of Birkenfeld. Therefore, the town and Degussa GmbH funded the construction of a railway from the town of Birkenfeld to Neubrücke. The original Birkenfeld was renamed Neubrücke station. The RNE took over the management of the Birkenfeld Railway and opened it on 5 October 1880.

As the line formed part of a route to the French border, it was soon duplicated. The line was connected to the Hindenburg Bridge, which was built between Rüdesheim am Rhein and Bingen-Kempten for strategic reasons. The bridge was built between 1913 and 1915 and destroyed in 1945. It connected a junction in Münster-Sarmsheim on the Nahe Valley Railway with the Right Rhine line. Because of the great military importance of the line, the RNE was acquired by the Prussian government with effect of 1 April 1881 and the company was dissolved. It became part of the Royal Railway Administration at Cologne, left Rhine (Königlichen Eisenbahndirektion Köln, linksrheinisch) of the Prussian state railways from 1 July 1883.

Between 1965 and 1979, the so-called Munzinger-Express also operated between Staudernheim and Bad Kreuznach.

=== Operator ===
Until the timetable change on 14 December 2014, the passenger services were operated by DB Regio Südwest. Regentalbahn’s subsidiary vlexx GmbH now operates passenger services on the Nahe Valley Railway from Saarbrücken towards Mainz and Frankfurt. It uses diesel multiple units of the LINT 81 and 54 classes. Passenger services on the Bad Kreuznach to Bingen section are still operated by DB Regio Südwest.

=== Connection over the Rhine ===
A line ran from Laubenheim over the Hindenburg Bridge for thirty years (1915–1945), carrying traffic across the Rhine to Rüdesheim and Geisenheim. The old railway embankments are still visible.

=== New tunnel construction ===
Coal was mined near the original Bildstock Tunnel (481 m) and a pillar of coal had to be left in place to support the foundations of the tunnel. The former Saargruben (later Saarbergwerke AG; today: DSK) mining company wanted to remove this to extend its mine. In 1955, therefore, the new Bildstock Tunnel (341 m) was built with an improved 600 m radius, bypassing the former tunnel.

=== Accidents ===
On 16 January 1918, the embankment between Kirn and Hochstetten (Nahe) was washed away during a storm by the Nahe and subsided. This caused the derailment of train 243, with troops on leave, causing the locomotive, van and three carriages to plunge into the river. 38 people were killed and 25 wounded.

== Recent developments ==
The Nahe Valley Railway is one of the main axes of rail passenger traffic in Rhineland-Palatinate and Saarland. During the last major rebuilding of the rail superstructure in 2004/2005, heavier rails (UIC 60 profile) were installed on concrete sleepers to allow the operation of tilting trains. The stations in Rhineland-Palatinate, formerly consistently in dilapidated condition, are gradually being rebuilt (like Neubrücke (Nahe), Kirn, Monzingen, Bad Sobernheim and from 2011, after years of dispute with Deutsche Bahn, also Bad Kreuznach). The rehabilitation of the tunnels on the line has now begun with the upgrade, relining and partial renewal of the tunnels at Heimbach and related slope safety measures.

In the Saarland, all stations, except Neunkirchen, have been equipped with electronic ticket machines.

For a while an upgrade of the line was considered for the northern branch of the Paris–Ostfrankreich–Südwestdeutschland (Paris–Eastern France–Southwest Germany) high-speed line. It was later decided to upgrade the Mannheim–Saarbrücken railway, because the costs for the electrification on the tunnel on the Nahe Valley Railway, which would have been required, were too high.

=== Rhineland Palatinate integrated timetable for 2015 ===
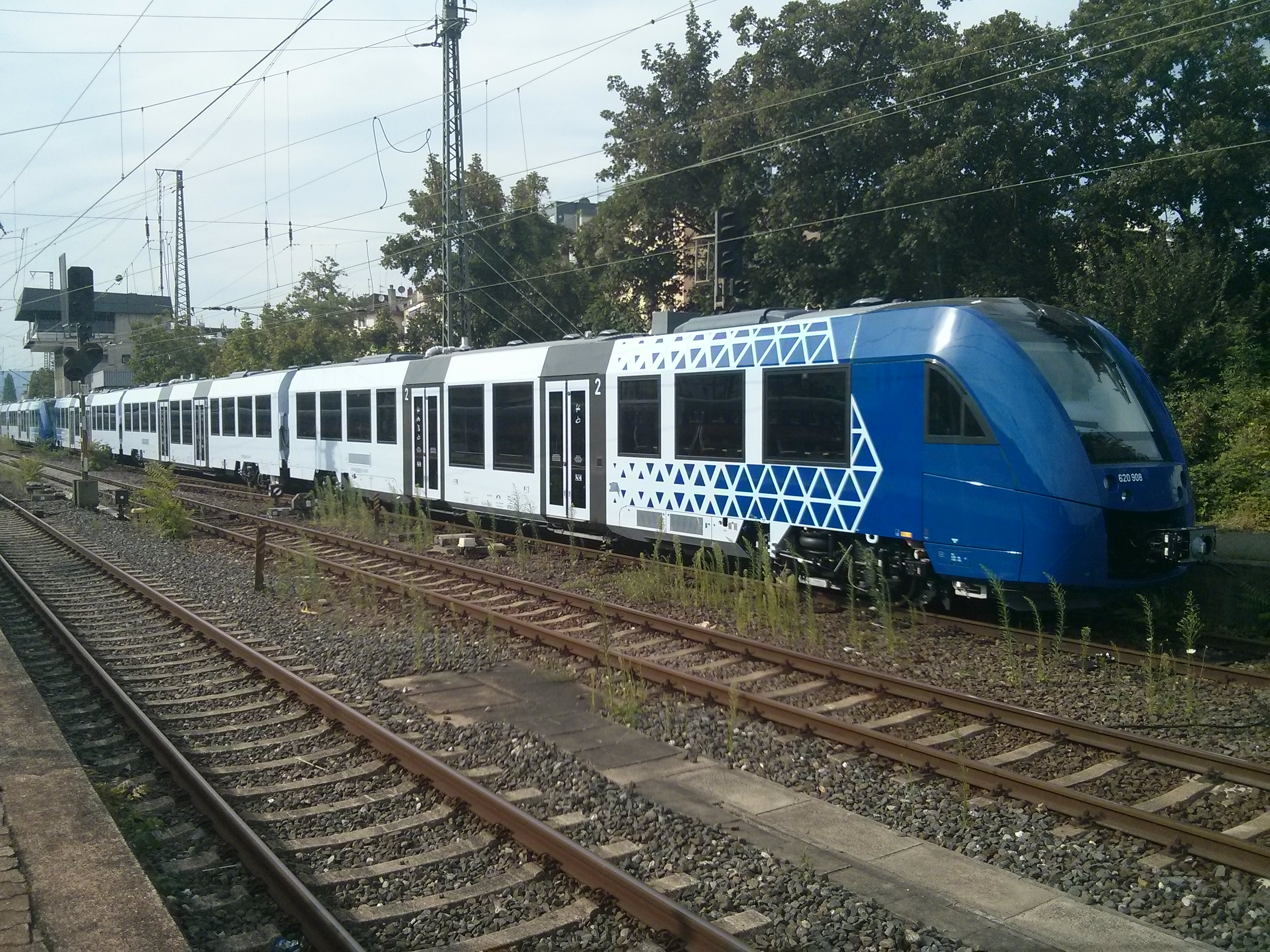
Class LINT 81 diesel multiple unit of vlexx GmbH in Mainz

With the introduction of the concept of the Rheinland-Pfalz-Takt 2015 (Rhineland Palatinate clock-face timetable) in the middle of 2008, services on the Nahe Valley Railway were improved. With the electrification of the line from Türkismühle to Neubrücke (Nahe) the Saarbrücken–Türkismühle Regionalbahn service was extended to Neubrücke. In addition, the Regionalbahn station of Hoppstädten (Nahe) is now only served by a bus conveying passengers to/from Neubrücke. This measure has already been implemented for the 2014/2015 timetable change. The electrification works meant that section the section between St. Wendel and Neubrücke (Nahe) had to be closed from 28 July 2014 to 4. September 2014. A rail replacement bus service was operated.

Heimbach, Nohen and Kronweiler are now served by a regular Regionalbahn service from Baumholder to Idar-Oberstein, extending to Kirn in the peak as part of the reactivation of passenger services on the nine kilometer-long branch line from Heimbach to Baumholder. The stations of Heimbach (Ort) and Ruschberg on the branch line are also served again. The infrastructure operator of the branch line is RP Eisenbahn.

The following stations on the Nahe Valley Railway are planned or under consideration (this does not include Baumholder, Heimbach Ort and Ruschberg, which are on the branch line):

- Idar-Oberstein Gewerbepark
- Idar-Oberstein Globus
- Bad Sobernheim Schulzentrum
- Niederhausen
- Bad Kreuznach Rheingrafenstraße
- Bad Kreuznach Michelin
- Planig and
- Mainz Schott AG

The Nahe-Express from Frankfurt am Main to Saarbrücken would possibly be split or coupled every hour in Bad Münster am Stein. The other portion of the train would run to/from Kaiserslautern.

== Route ==
Between Bad Kreuznach and Türkismühle the route runs primarily on the north side of the Nahe. The line crosses the Nahe twice in the four km section between Bad Kreuznach and Bad Münster and eleven times between Bad Münster and Idar-Oberstein. It runs along the Blies between St. Wendel and Neunkirchen (Saar) Hbf.

The Nahe Valley Railway runs largely parallel to federal highway 41 and their paths cross several times. The first crossing takes place north of Bad Kreuznach. The railway and highway run parallel from Bad Sobernheim through the Nahe valley, until the road leaves the valley in the Idar-Oberstein district of Enzweiler. The railway and road also run parallel on a second, much shorter section between Neubrücke (Nahe) and Nohfelden.

South of Namborn the railway line crosses the road again and the two run parallel with the course of the Blies between St. Wendel and Ottweiler. West of Neunkirchen, highway 41 crosses the line one last time. The line crosses the A 8 and A 623 autobahns on its way to Saarbrücken Hauptbahnhof.

== Track upgrading ==
The section between Türkismühle (line-kilometre 89.0) and Saarbrücken Hauptbahnhof has been electrified since 1969 and the Saarbrücken–Neunkirchen line via Fischbach-Camphausen (Fischbach Valley Railway) has been operated electrically since 1965.

Because work was carried out from 2007 to 2013 on sections of tunnel to enlarge the internal radius of the tunnels from four to five metres, operations between Neubrücke and Idar-Oberstein ran over a single track for several months.

In the summer of 2012, the section of the line between Neunkirchen and Saarbrücken was closed to allow renewal of the track and repair work on the Bildstock Tunnel. Regional-Express and freight trains were diverted via the Fischbach Valley Railway and the remaining passenger services were replaced by buses for the duration of the work.

The section between Türkismühle and Neubrücke (Nahe) was electrified in the summer of 2014, requiring it to be closed for six weeks.

== Operations ==
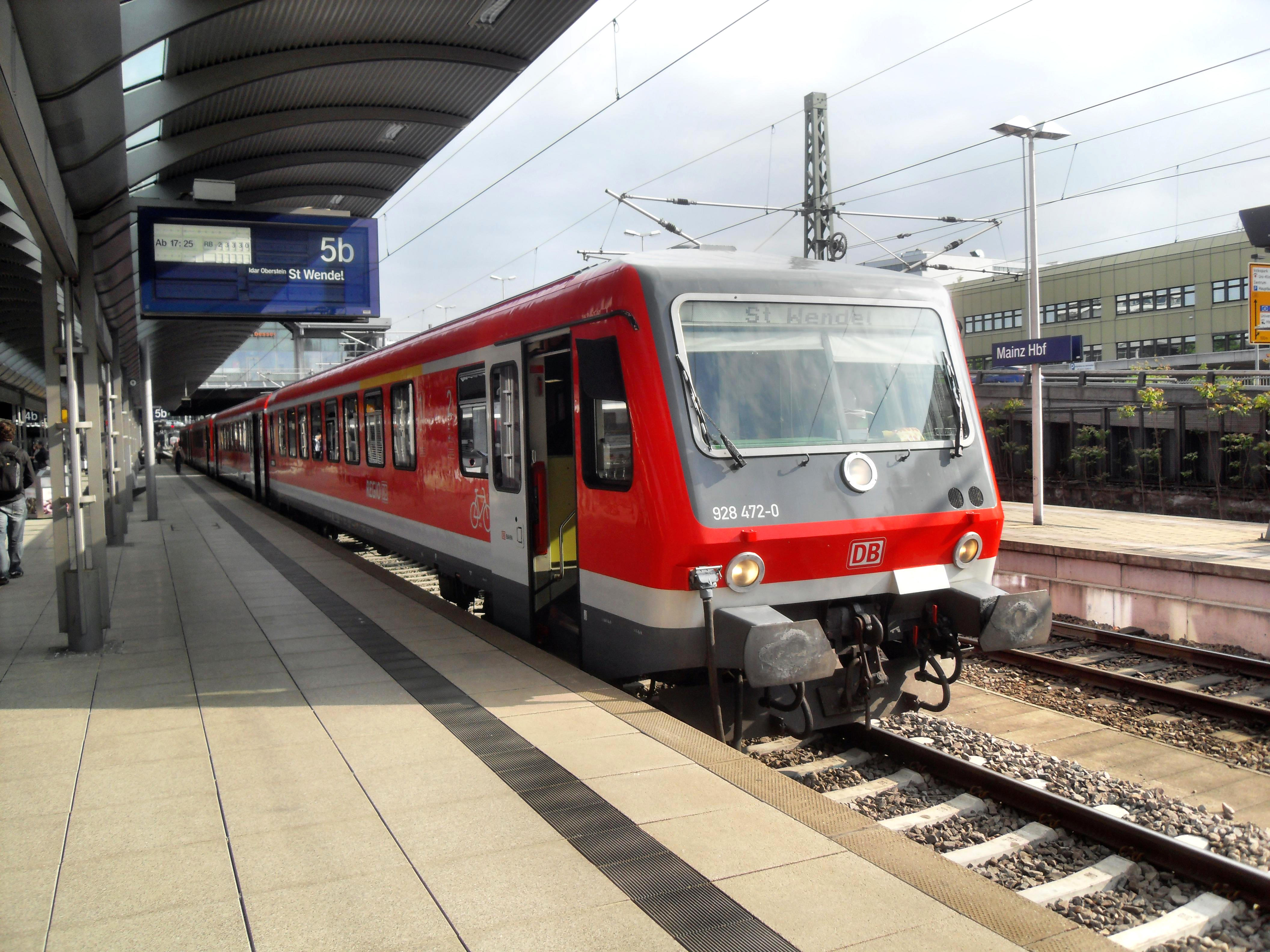
Regionalbahn service operated with class 628 DMU in Mainz Hauptbahnhof on its way to St. Wendel

The Saarbrücken–Türkismühle section has long had a dense service. After the line was electrified, services were mainly operated with Silberling carriages hauled by class 140 and 141 electric locomotives. North of Türkismühle class VT 95 (795) and VT 98 (798) railbuses were often used.

Express trains running between Saarbrücken, Idar-Oberstein, Bad Kreuznach, Bingen, Mainz and Frankfurt am Main were also mostly formed of Silberling carriages hauled by class 01 steam locomotives and later by class V200 and 218 diesel locomotives.

Already in 1960 there were long-distance trains between Paris Gare de l'Est and Frankfurt, which stopped only at Saarbrücken, Neunkirchen, St Wendel, Neubrücke, Heimbach, Idar-Oberstein, Kirn, Bad Sobernheim, Bad Münster, Bad Kreuznach, Bingerbrück and Mainz.

In 1985 the line was upgraded. The D 258/59 express from Paris Est to Frankfurt operated over the Alsenz Valley Railway between Kaiserslautern and Bad Kreuznach, using French carriages and was hauled from Saarbrücken to Frankfurt by class 218 diesel locomotives. This was followed in 1988 by a pair of D-trains (expresses) on the Saarbrücken–Frankfurt–Kassel–Göttingen route, which also ran over the Nahe Valley Railway. In 1990 these long distance services were discontinued.

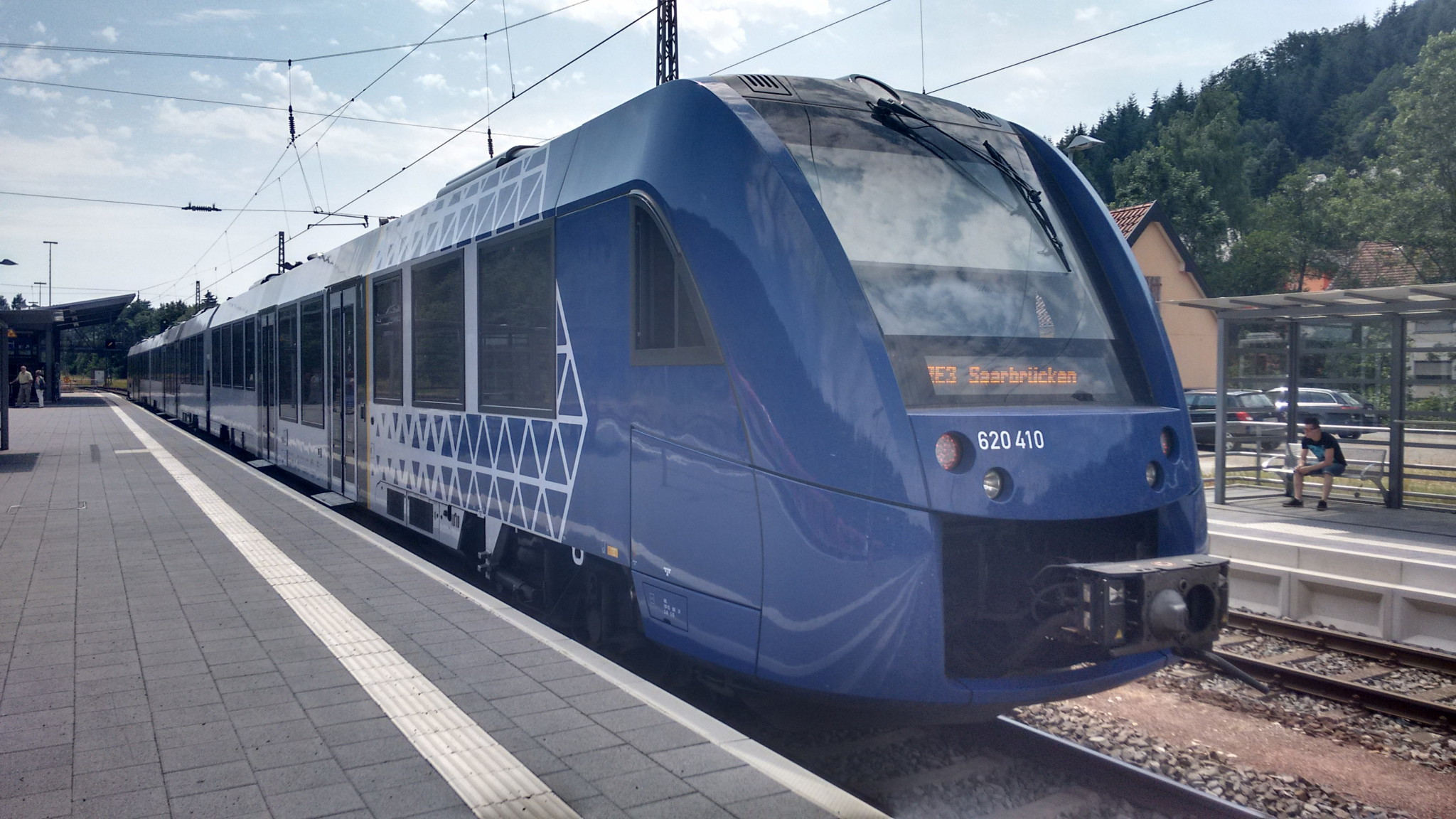
vlexx 620-410 (LINT 81) running as RE 3 service from Frankfurt to Saarbrücken in Türkismühle

Today, there is an hourly service on the Saarbrücken–Mainz route, run as the Rhine-Nahe-Express (RE3) Regional-Express service. Every second train runs to and from Frankfurt and stops at the Frankfurt Airport Regional station. Until 2014, tilting systems of class 612 were operated, but since the change of operators in December 2014, vlexx has operated LINT 54 and 81 diesel multiple units without tilt technology, although the journey times on the line have only increased slightly.

Regionalbahn line RB 73 services on the Türkismühle–Saarbrücken section are operated with class 425 and 426 electric multiple units. On the Heimbach–Mainz section, the vlexx RB 33 and RB 34 services are operated with LINT 54 and 81 diesel multiple units.

== Operating points ==
=== Bingen (Rhein) Hauptbahnhof ===
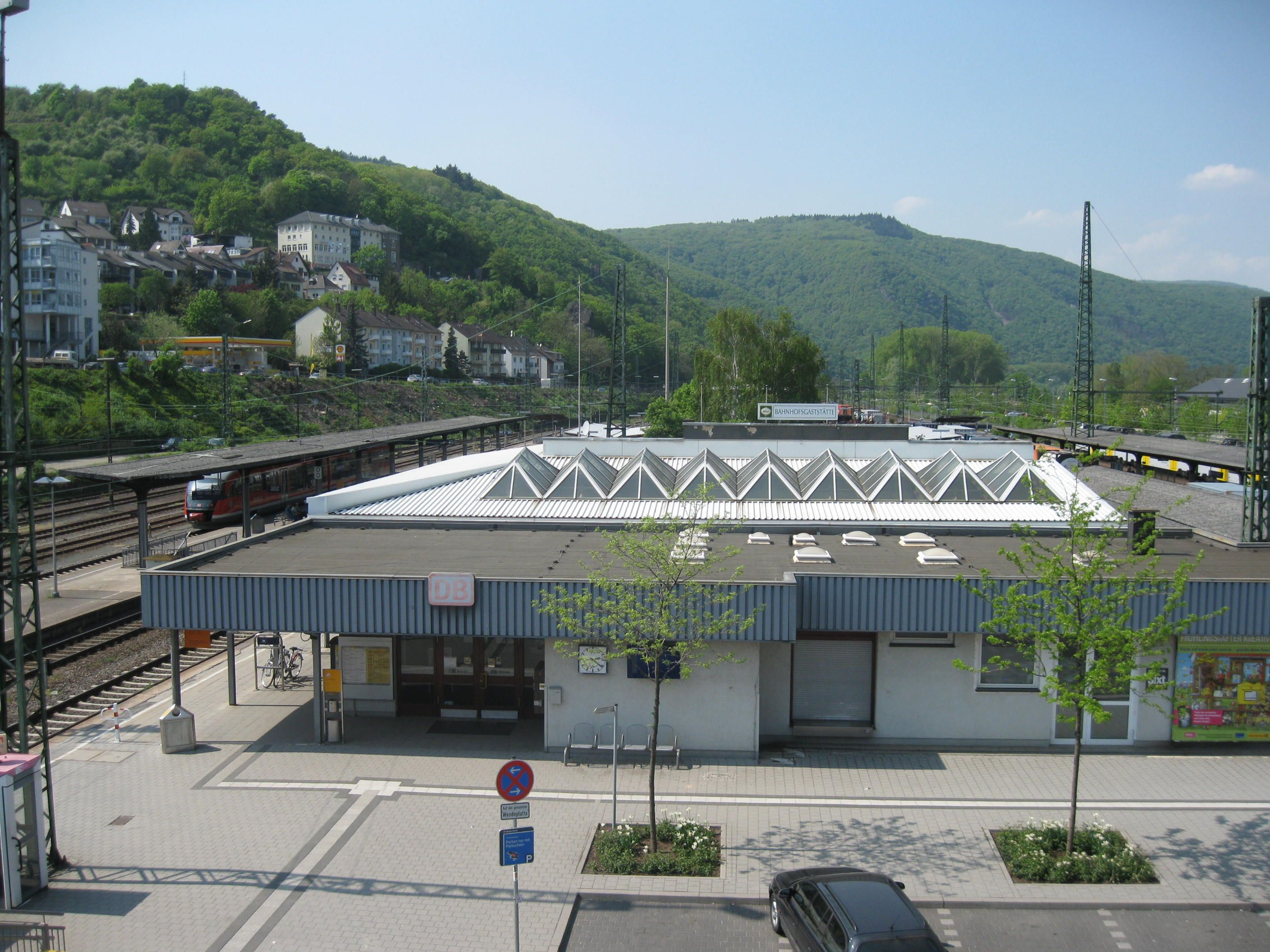
Bingen (Rhein) Hbf

Binger Hauptbahnhof is located in the suburb of Bingerbrück, which until 1969 was an independent municipality. For this reason it was called Bingerbrück station. Because it has been incorporated into Bingen am Rhein, it was given its present name in 1993 as the most important station in the city.

=== Münster-Sarmsheim ===
The halt (Haltepunkt) of Münster-Sarmsheim is located on the north-eastern edge of Münster-Sarmsheim.

=== Langenlonsheim ===
Langenlonsheim station is located in the north of Langenlonsheim. From 1889 to 1984, the Trans-Hunsrück Railway (Hunsrückquerbahn) ran from it via Simmern to Hermeskeil, but it is now only used by freight as far as Stromberg (Hunsrück).

=== Bretzenheim (Nahe) ===
The halt of Bretzenheim (Nahe) is located on the southern outskirts of Bretzenheim.

=== Bad Kreuznach freight yard ===
At the time of the opening, this was the terminus of the Nahe line. With its extension to Oberstein it became a through station. With the establishment of the Gau Algesheim–Bad Kreuznach railway, it lost passenger services, but remained as a freight yard.

=== Bad Kreuznach ===
Bad Kreuznach station is located in the centre of Bad Kreuznach.

=== Bad Münster am Stein ===
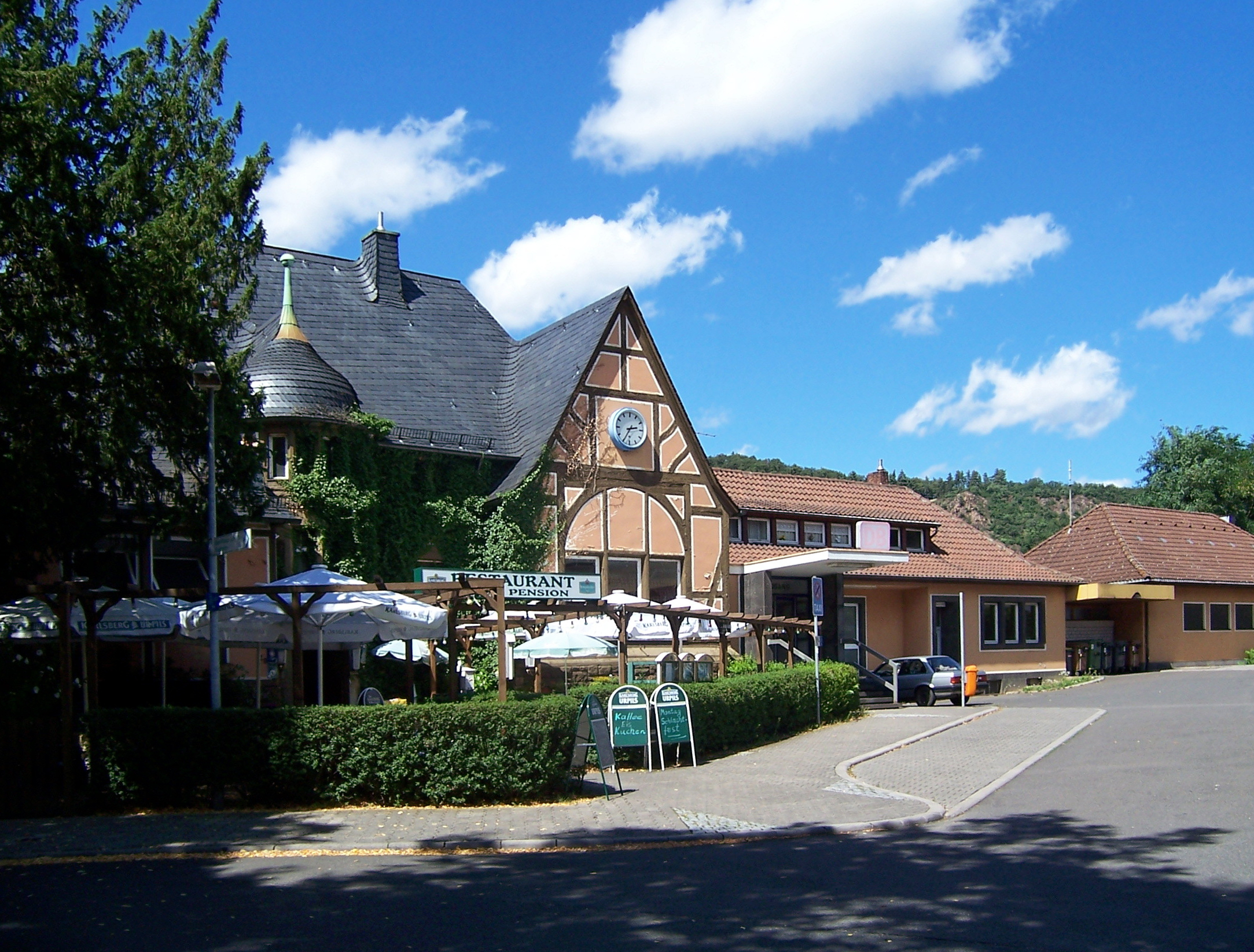
Bad Münster am Stein station

Bad Münster am Stein station was originally a through station, but with the opening of the Kreuznach–Oberstein section, it became a junction station. It was connected to the Glan Valley Railway (Glantalbahn), which was built for strategic reasons in 1904. As a result, it became the junction of three double-track lines. It was bombed in the Second World War because of its importance as a strategic railway junction.

Its entrance building is a monument-protected Jugendstil building, which includes a partly half-timbered building. It was completed around 1910 during the construction of the strategic railway. Its architecture reflects the fact that Bad Münster is a health resort. The Odernheim–Bad Münster section of the Glan Valley Railway was closed in 1961 and only the section of track to the nearby branch to the Niederhausen power station continued to be served, but this was closed in 1992. Freight operations at the station ended at the end of the 1980s.

=== Norheim ===
The halt of Norheim is located in the centre of Norheim.

=== Staudernheim ===
Staudernheim station was opened with the Kreuznach–Oberstein section originally as a through station. In addition, it was the only station in Hesse-Homburg. After the connection of the lower Glan Valley Railway to Staudernheim station it was extended in 1897. With the opening of the strategic railway to Bad Münster, the section between Odernheim and Staudernheim became essentially a connecting curve. It regained importance after the closure of the Odernheim–Bad Münster section in 1961, but it was finally closed in 1996.

=== Bad Sobernheim ===
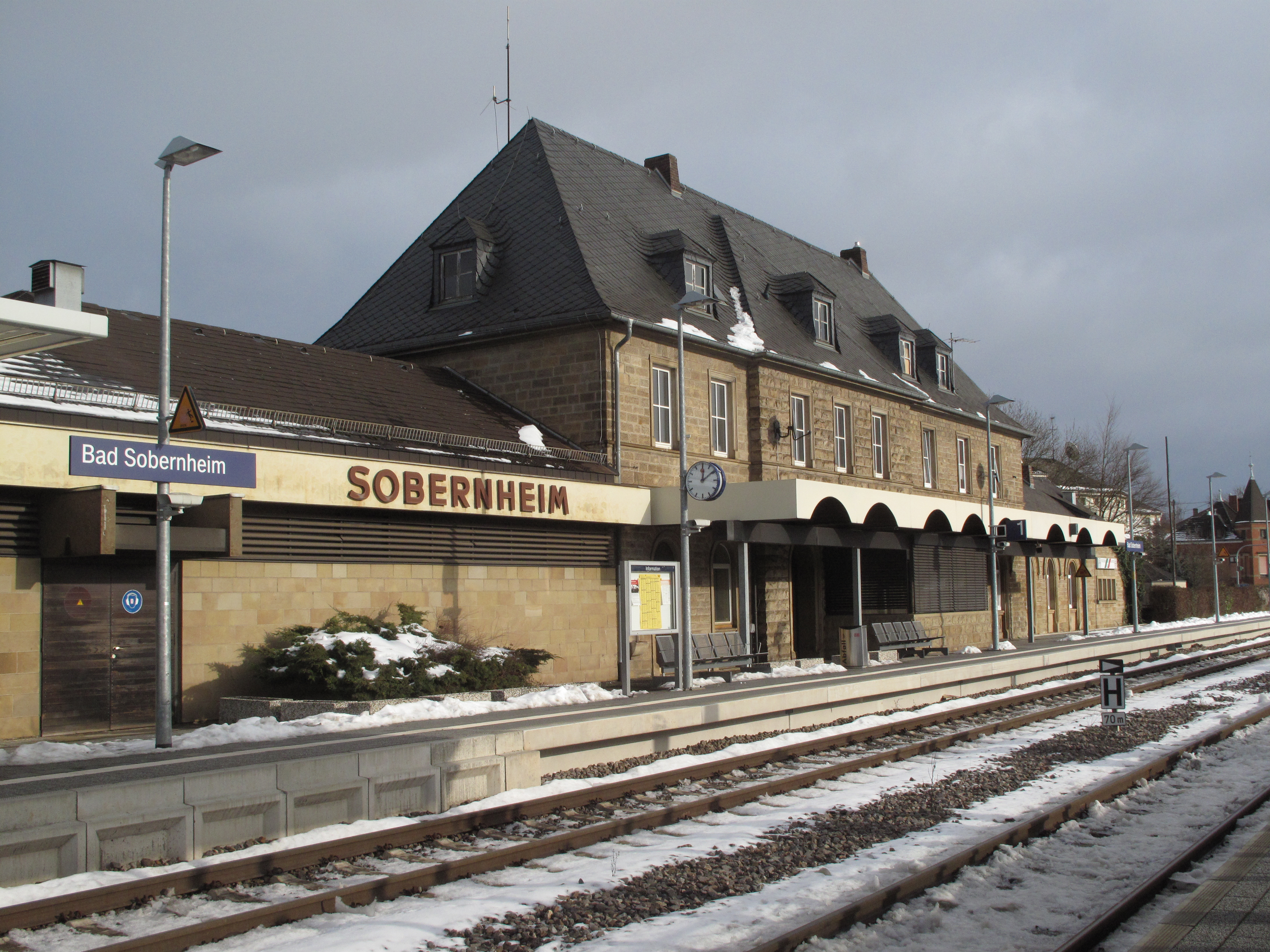
Bad Sobernheim station

Bad Sobernheim station is located in the south of the town of Bad Sobernheim not far from its centre. Until 1995, it was called Sobernheim and it only received its current name when the town received its prefix of Bad (bath).

=== Monzingen ===
The halt of Monzingen is located on the southern outskirts of Monzingen.

=== Martinstein ===
The halt of Martinstein is located on the southern outskirts of Martinstein.

=== Hochstetten (Nahe) ===
The halt of Hochstetten (Nahe) is located on the southeast edge of Hochstetten.

=== Kirn ===
Kirn station is located on the southern outskirts of Kirn.

=== Kirnsulzbach ===
The halt of Kirnsulzbach is located in the south of Kirn-Sulzbach.

=== Fischbach-Weierbach ===
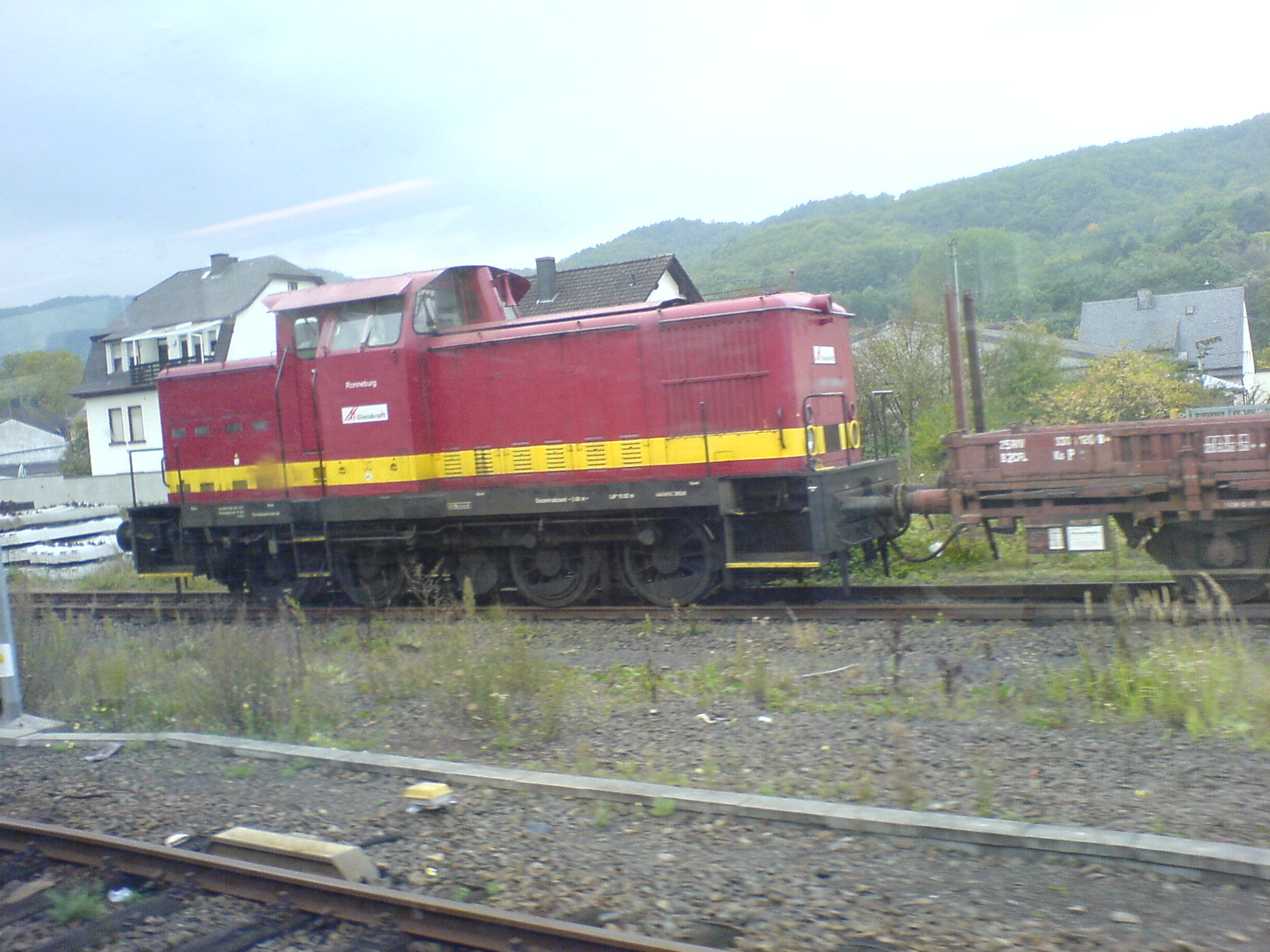
Fischbach-Weierbach station

The halt of Fischbach-Weierbach is located in the southeast of Fischbach; Weierbach is further south-west.

=== Idar-Oberstein ===
Originally Idar-Oberstein station was called only Oberstein. It was commissioned in December 1859 as the terminus of the section opened from Kreuznach. Already half a year later it became a through station when the line was extended to Neunkirchen. It is located in the south of the town of Idar-Oberstein.

=== Kronweiler ===
The halt of Kronweiler is located in the centre of Kronweiler.

=== Nohen ===
The halt of Nohen is located in the centre of Nohen.

=== Heimbach (Nahe) ===
Heimbach (Nahe) station is located about three kilometres west of the municipality of Heimbach, which despite its name lies outside the Nahe valley. It is in the territory of Hoppstädten-Weiersbach. The railway to Baumholder was reactivated from the timetable change on 14 December 2014.

=== Hoppstädten (Nahe) ===
The halt of Hoppstädten (Nahe) is located to the east of Hoppstädten. Since the timetable change on 14 December 2014, only a few Regionalbahn services stop at this station. Hoppstadt is now connected to the railway network mainly by a bus to Neubrucke.

=== Neubrücke (Nahe) ===
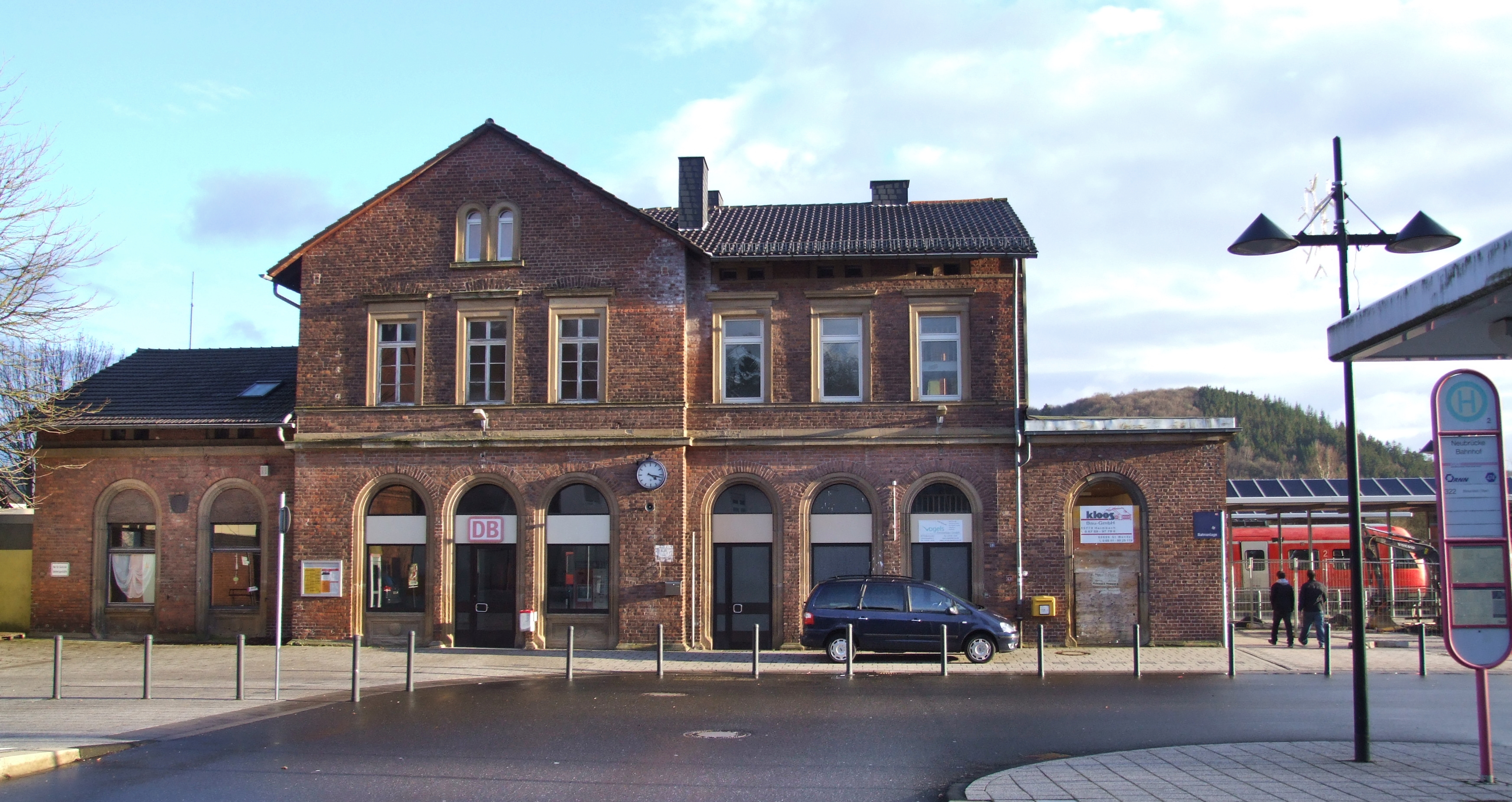
Neubrücke (Nahe) station

Neubrücke (Nahe) station is located in the southeast of Neubrücke in the municipality of Hoppstädten-Weiersbach. The now dismantled Birkenfeld Railway (Birkenfelder Eisenbahn) branched from the station; the line connected Birkenfeld to the rail network. With the electrification of the Nahe line to Neubrücke, it has serves as the terminus of RB 73 services from Saarbrücken since the timetable change on 14 December 2014.

=== Nohfelden ===
The halt of Nohfelden is located at the western edge of Nohfelden/Nahe.

=== Türkismühle ===
Türkismühle station is located on the northeastern edge of Türkismühle, a town in the municipality of Nohfelden. It was put in operations in 1860 with the opening of the section between Oberstein and Neunkirchen. It became the terminus of the Hochwald Railway (Hochwaldbahn) from Trier when it was opened in 1889. The Türkismühle–Kusel railway was opened in 1936. Both branches have now lost their passenger traffic. As a result of the electrification of the Nahe railway to Neubrücke (Nahe), the station has not been the terminus of the RB 73 from Saarbrücken since the timetable change on 14 December 2014.

=== Walhausen (Saar) ===
The halt of Walhausen (Saar) is located on the southern outskirts of Walhausen (Saar), a village in the municipality of Nohfelden.

=== Namborn ===
The halt of Namborn is located on the northeastern outskirts of Namborn.

=== Hofeld ===
The halt of Hofeld is located in the centre of Hofeld, a village in the municipality of Namborn.

=== Baltersweiler ===
The halt of Baltersweiler is located on the south-eastern outskirts of Baltersweiler, a village in the municipality of Namborn.

=== St. Wendel ===
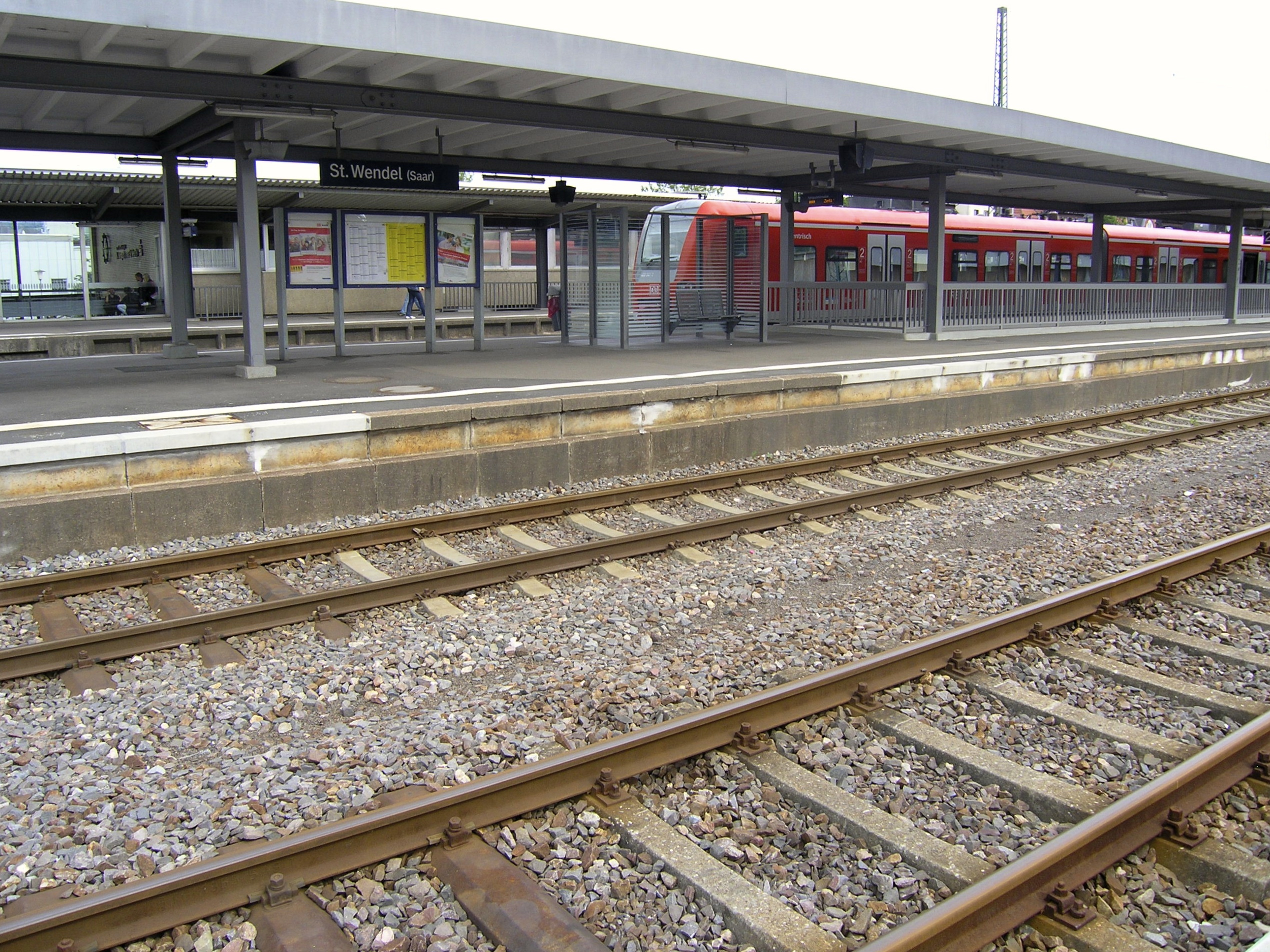
Class 425/426 in St. Wendel station

St. Wendel station is located in the centre of the town of St. Wendel. The now dismantled St. Wendel–Tholey railway branched from it.

=== Oberlinxweiler ===
The halt of Oberlinxweiler is located on the eastern edge of Oberlinxweiler, a village in the municipality of St. Wendel.

=== Niederlinxweiler ===
The halt of Niederlinxweiler is located close to the centre of Niederlinxweiler, a village in the municipality of St. Wendel.

=== Ottweiler (Saar) ===
Ottweiler (Saar) station was put into operation in 1860 with the opening of the section between Oberstein and Neunkirchen. It was not until 77 years later that the Oster Valley Railway (Ostertalbahn) opened to Niederkirchen, making it a junction station. It was extended a year later to Schwarzerden and is now operated as a heritage railway. The entrance building was rebuilt and an island platform was built for the opening of the branch line. In addition, it received a pedestrian underpass.

=== Wiebelskirchen ===
The halt of Wiebelskirchen is located in the west of Wiebelskirchen, a village in the municipality of Neunkirchen, right at the end of the tunnel. It used to be a block post.

=== Neunkirchen (Saar) Hauptbahnhof ===
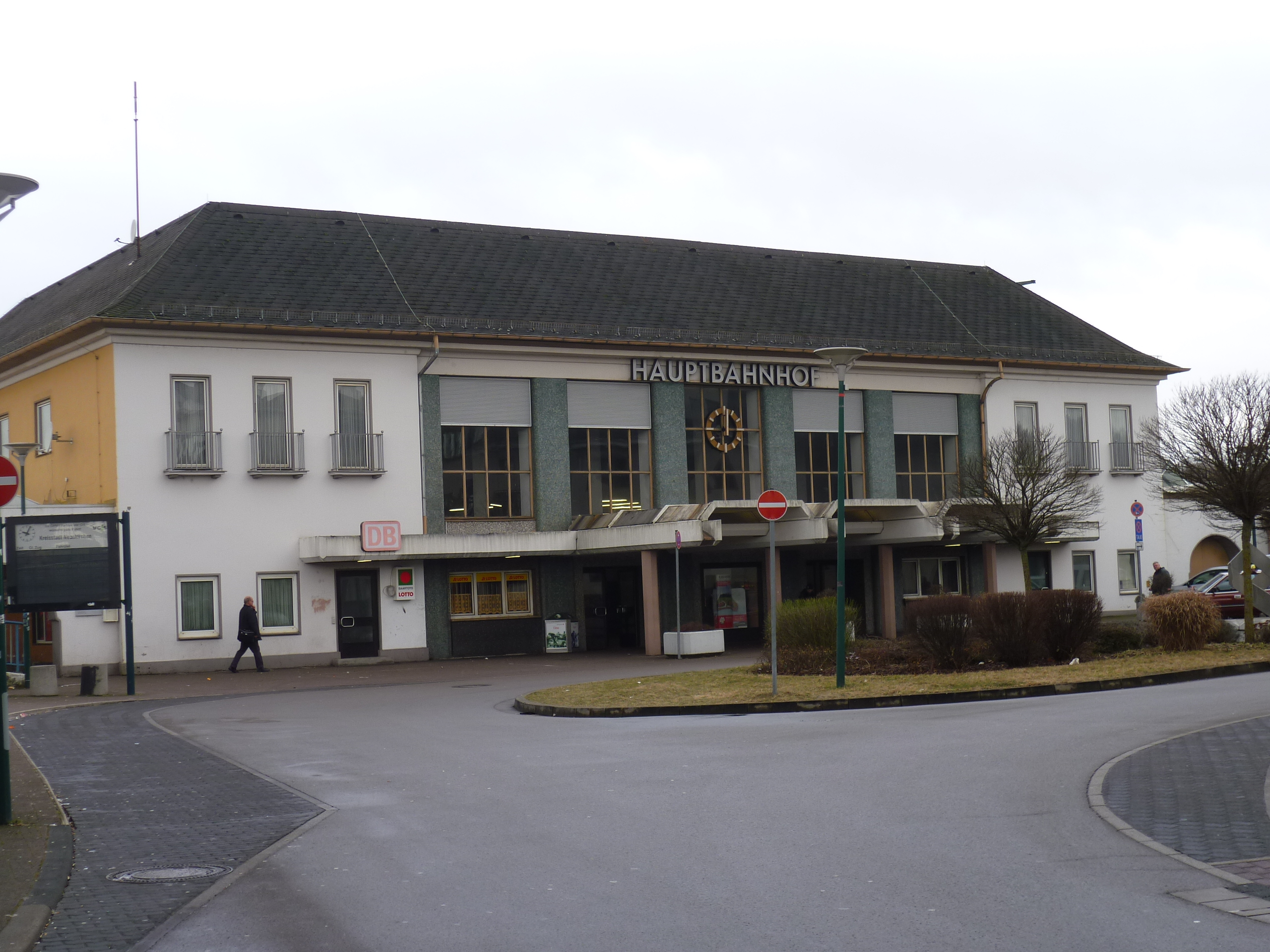
Neunkirchen (Saar) Hauptbahnhof

Neunkirchen Hauptbahnhof is located on the northern outskirts of Neunkirchen. It was opened in 1850 and is now a Keilbahnhof (wedge station). It is also the terminus of the Fischbach Valley Railway (Fischbachtalbahn)—which runs from here parallel with the Nahe Valley Railway to the terminus of both lines at Saarbrücken, at a distance of about two kilometres—and the Homburg–Neunkirchen railway. The platforms of the Nahe Valley Railway are numbered 1 to 3 and the platforms of the line towards Homburg/Wemmetsweiler are numbered 25 to 27. The former platforms 4 and 7 were on the Fischbach Valley Railway and the Nahe Valley Railway. Trains from/to Schiffweiler now initially run over the Nahe Valley Railway. The Neunkirchen–Neunkirchen-Heinitz railway, formerly connected from the collieries of Dechen and Heinitz. The station is also a distribution point for freight transport and freight tracks extend along all the lines. While the station used to be mainly used for coal and steel trains, it now mainly serves for train marshalling. There are also eight connecting tracks to the rolling mill of Saarstahl AG (Saar Steel).

The station has a central signal box of the Sp Dr S60 class, which was built in 1965. Apart from Neunkirchen station, it controls the stations on the Sulzbach line (Dudweiler, Sulzbach, Friedrichsthal, Landsweiler-Reden) as well as Bexbach station on the line to Homburg and its long-distance signals.

The station is currently barrier-free and equipped with lifts, but it is still in a poor condition. There are toilets and free parking.

=== Landsweiler-Reden ===
Landsweiler-Reden station is located on the southern outskirts of Landsweiler-Reden, a village in the municipality of Schiffweiler. In the past, the station was just called Reden. It is located opposite the now closed Reden colliery. The line ran here as three tracks to Neunkirchen to the (now partly disused) west side of Neunkirchen Hauptbahnhof (Schlawerie), with separate passenger tracks (the existing tracks) and a track from the two mines of Itzenplitz and Reden (only the railway embankment now exists). In addition, there was a line to the Itzenplitz colliery in the neighbouring town of Heiligenwald. The station was in a poor condition until 2016, when it was fundamentally renovated in the spring of 2016. There is a signal box of class Sp Dr S60 in the station building, which is normally remotely-controlled from Neunkirchen station.

=== Bildstock ===
The halt of Bildstock is located on the northwestern outskirts of Bildstock, directly in front of Bildstock tunnel. Previously, it had two signal boxes.

=== Friedrichsthal Mitte ===
The barrier-free halt of Friedrichsthal Mitte, which is close to the centre of Friedrichsthal, was opened in 2004. It is located on the other side of the Bildstock tunnel.

=== Friedrichsthal (Saar) ===
Friedrichsthal (Saar) station is located in the southwest of Friedrichsthal. The station building is in poor condition.

=== Sulzbach (Saar) Altenwald ===
The halt of Sulzbach (Saar) Altenwald is located at the level of the Sulzbach suburb of Altenwald.

=== Sulzbach (Saar) ===
Sulzbach (Saar) station is located in the centre of Sulzbach (Saar). It used to be a connecting track to the Grube Altenwald (colliery), in addition there were several sidings and a small freight yard. Today the extensive facilities are largely dismantled, but there are still seven tracks. In the station building is the signal box for Sulzbach and Friedrichsthal, which is remotely-controlled from Neunkirchen.

=== Dudweiler ===
Dudweiler station is located in the centre of the Saarbrück district of Dudweiler. It used to be a connecting track to Grube Dudweiler (colliery). The only parts of the building that are still used are the pedestrian underpass to the platform and the signal box; it is badly run-down. The signal box is remote controlled from Neunkirchen. Because freight train branch off at the station to the Saarbrücken marshalling yard, the line from Dudweiler-Jägersfreude section has three tracks.

=== Jägersfreude ===
The halt of Jägersfreude is located in the centre of the Saarbrücker district of Jägersfreude. Until the end of the millennium, Jägerfreude was also a railway junction, which was controlled from the signal box in Saarbrücken Hbf. The freight trains between Dudweiler and Saarbrücken could use three railway tracks, because the parallel (single-track) freight bypass line bypassed it to reach the Saarbrücken marshalling yard. Today, the four sets of points and block signals, which controlled the junction have been dismantled. At the same time, the first sets of points are at the level of the platform at the Saarbrücken marshalling yard. The junction was abandoned as the signal box of Saarbrücken Hbf was converted and control transferred to Karlsruhe.

=== Saarbrücken Hauptbahnhof ===
Saarbrücker Hauptbahnhof has existed since 1852 and was initially called St. Johann-Saarbrücken. It is now the most important station in Saarland. In addition, it is the terminus of several other railway lines such as the Fischbach Valley Railway, the Rémilly–Saarbrücken railway, the Saar Railway, the Mannheim–Saarbrücken railway and the Saarbrücken–Sarreguemines railway. The trains of the Saarbahn from Sarreguemines to Lebach stop in front of the station.

== Sources ==
=== References ===
- Brumm, R. (1987). Die Rhein-Nahe-Bahn. Bingerbrück bis Neunkirchen [The Rhine-Nahe railway. Bingerbrück to Neunkirchen] (in German). Bad Kreuznach: Edition Nahetal. ISBN 3-926421-00-2.
- Deutsche Reichsbahn, ed. (1935). Handbuch der deutschen Eisenbahnstrecken [Handbook of German Railways] (in German). Berlin. ISBN 3-921426-29-4(Reprint: Dumjahn, Mainz, 1984)
- Emich, Hans-Joachim; Becker, Rolf (1996). Die Eisenbahnen an Glan und Lauter [The railways on the Glan and the Lauter] (in German). Waldmohr: self-published. p. 55. ISBN 978-3980491907.
- Engbarth, Fritz (2009). 150 Jahre Eisenbahnen zwischen Bad Kreuznach und Idar-Oberstein - die attraktive Regionalschnellverkehrslinie entlang der Nahe hat Geburtstag [150 years of railways between Bad Kreuznach and Idar-Oberstein - the attractive regional express line along the Nahe has a birthday] (PDF) (in German). Archived from the original (PDF) on 2019-06-03.
- Eisenbahnatlas Deutschland (German railway atlas). Schweers + Wall. 2009. ISBN 978-3-89494-139-0.
- Sturm, Heinz (2005). Die pfälzischen Eisenbahnen [The Palatine Railways] (in German). Ludwigshafen am Rhein: pro MESSAGE. ISBN 3-934845-26-6.
- Weltner, Martin (2008). Bahn-Katastrophen. Folgenschwere Zugunfälle und ihre Ursachen (in German). Munich. p. 14. ISBN 978-3-7654-7096-7.
