= Jung (surname) =

Here are some notable people with the surname Jung:

- Ali Yavar Jung (1906–1976), Indian diplomat
- Anuja Jung (born 1971), Indian air pistol sport shooter
- Mohammad Anwar Jung Talukdar (died 1986), Bangladeshi politician
- André Jung (musician) (born 1961), Brazilian drummer and journalist
- Andrea Jung (born 1958), Canadian-American executive
- Andreas Jung (born 1973), German politician
- Arastu Yar Jung (1858–1940), Indian surgeon
- Bahadur Yar Jung (1905–1944), Indian politician
- Bertel Jung (1872–1946), Finnish architect and urban planner
- Brandon Jung (born 1986), Canadian water polo player
- C. G. Jung (1875–1961), Swiss psychiatrist and founder of analytical psychology
- Christian Jung (born 1956), German geneticist and plant breeder
- Christian Jung (born 1977), German politician
- Cläre Jung (1892–1981), German journalist and political activist
- Douglas Jung (1924–2002), Canadian politician
- Edgar Julius Jung (1894–1934), German lawyer
- Emma Jung (1882–1955), Swiss psychoanalyst and author
- Franz Jung (1889–1963), German writer
- Franz Josef Jung (born 1949), German politician
- Franz Jung (bishop), (born 1966) German Roman Catholic bishop
- George Jung (1942–2021), American drug trafficker and smuggler
- Hans Otto Jung (1920–2009), German viticulturist, jazz musician and patron of music
- Heinrich Jung (1876–1953), German mathematician
- Helge Jung (1886–1978), Swedish Army officer
- Ingmar Jung (born 1978), German politician
- Jace Jung (born 2000), American baseball player
- Jacob Jung (1857–1931), American politician and businessman
- Jakob Jung (1895–unknown), German Nazi Party official
- Johann Heinrich Jung (1740–1817), German author
- Joseph Jung (born 1955), Swiss historian and publicist
- Josh Jung (born 1998), American baseball player
- Julio Jung (born 1942), Chilean television and film actor
- Karl Gustav Jung (1795–1864), German-Swiss medical doctor, political activist, professor of Medicine
- Kurt Jung (1925–1989), German politician
- Magnus Jung (born 1971), German politician
- Margarete Jung (1898–1979), German communist, and anti Nazism activist
- Michael E. Jung (born 1947), American academic
- Nathan Jung (1946–2021), American actor and stuntman
- Paul Lejeune-Jung (1882–1944), German economist, politician and resistance fighter
- Rudolf Jung (1882–1945), agitator of German-Czech National Socialism and member of the German Nazi Party
- Samaresh Jung (born 1970), Indian sport shooter
- Sanam Jung (born 1988), Pakistani actress, model and television host
- Sandro Jung (born 1976), literary scholar
- Sina-Valeska Jung (born 1979), German actress
- Theo Jung (1906–1996), American photographer
- Talukdar Mohammad Towhid Jung Murad (born 1971), Bangladeshi politician
- Vanessa Jung (born 1980), German actress
- Walter Jung (Gauleiter) (1895–unknown), German Nazi Party official

== See also ==
- Young (disambiguation)
- Zheng (surname), written as 鄭 in traditional Chinese script or as 郑 in simplified Chinese script
- "Junge", a 2007 song by German rock band Die Ärzte
