= Saarbrücken Railway =

Railway in Germany

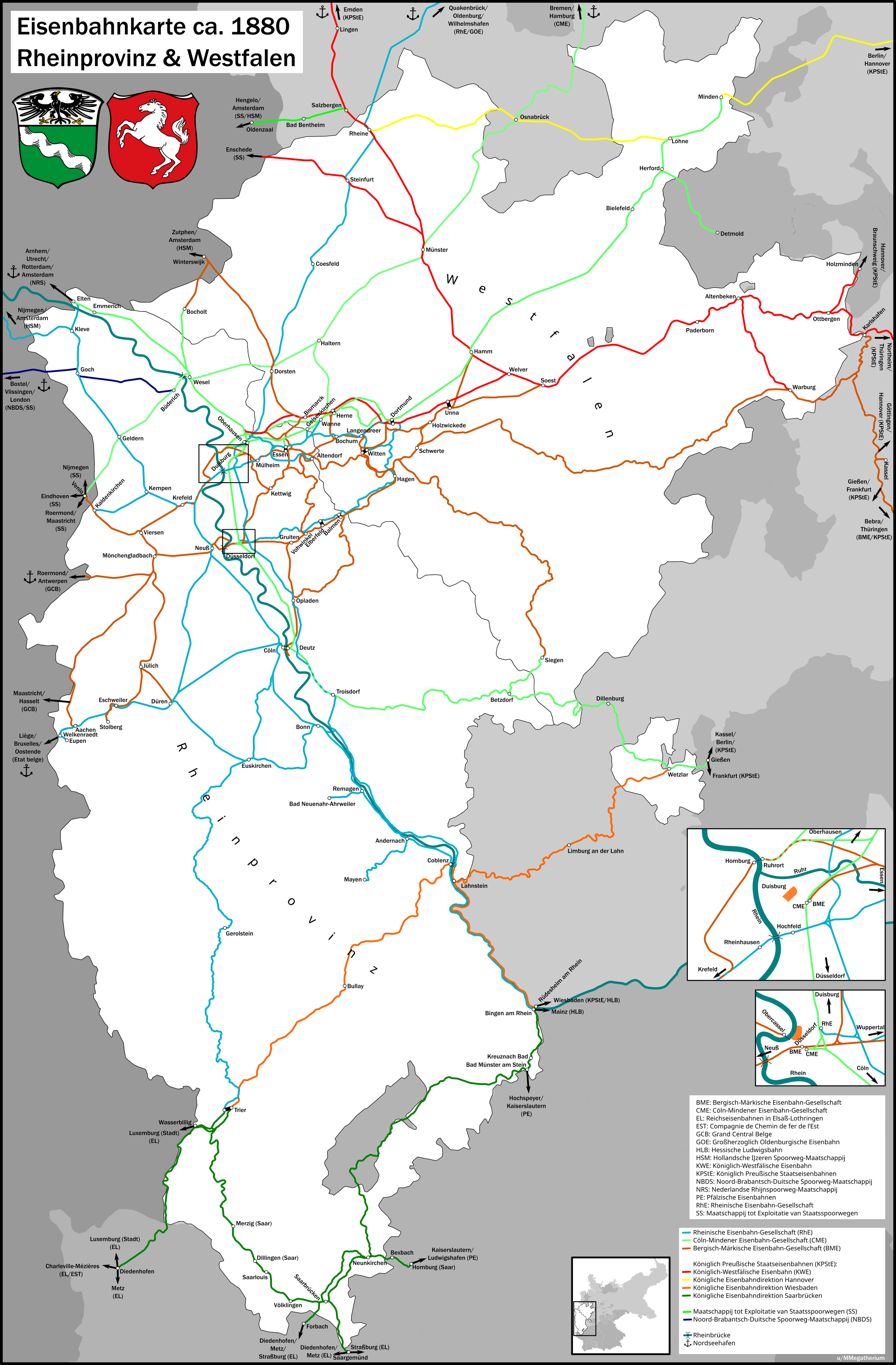
Railway map of the Saarbrücker Eisenbahn in the Rhine Province and Westfalen (ca. 1880)

The Saarbrücken Railway (German: Saarbrücker Eisenbahn) was a division of the Prussian state railways that was responsible for the construction of the first railways in the Saarland. The Royal Administration of the Saarbrücken Railway (Königliche Direction der Saarbrücker Eisenbahn) was established on 22 May 1852 with the goal of managing and operating the soon to be opened state railway line from the (then) border with Bavaria near Bexbach via Neunkirchen and St. Johann-Saarbrücken to the French border at Forbach. It replaced the Royal Commission for the construction of the Saarbrücken Railway (Königlichen Kommission für den Bau der Saarbrücker Eisenbahn), which had been created at the end of 1847 by the Prussian government with responsibility for the planning and construction of this line.

On 1 July 1859, it was renamed as the Royal Railway Administration at Saarbrücken (Königliche Eisenbahn-Direction zu Saarbrücken). At the same time it took over the management of the private Rhine-Nahe Railway Company (Rhein-Nahe Eisenbahn-Gesellschaft). In the following years the rail network of the Saarbrücken Railway grew to a total length of 365 km when it became part of the Railway Administration in Frankfurt am Main (Eisenbahn-Direction in Frankfurt am Main) on 1 July 1880. Shortly later, on 1 April 1881, these lines became part of the Royal Railway Administration (left Rhine) in Cologne (Königlichen Eisenbahn-Direction (linksrheinisch) in Köln).

== Development of the rail network ==
The Palatine Ludwig Railway Company (Pfälzische Ludwigsbahn-Gesellschaft) opened its main line from Homburg to the Prussian border on 25 August 1849. On 20 October 1850 the Saarbrücken Railway extended the line to Neunkirchen. Two years later, on 16 November 1852, passenger trains ran on the line, known as the Forbach Railway, via Sulzbach, Dudweiler and St. Johann-Saarbrücken to reach the French border at Forbach. Freight trains operated on this line from 1 December 1852.

The next line built was the Saar line down the Saar valley from Saarbrücken to Trier. It was opened on 16 December 1858 to Merzig and on 26 May 1860 to Trier West on the left bank of the Moselle. On 29 August 1861 the Trier western line was opened from a junction at Konz to the Luxembourg border at Wasserbillig. Upstream a line was opened on 1 June 1870 to Sarreguemines in Lorraine, which was occupied by German troops at the time during the Franco-Prussian War.

In 1878/79 several line were opened just before the Saar lines' inclusion of the Railway Administration of Frankfurt:

- on 15 May 1878, the Upper Mosel line from Ehrang via Trier to Perl,
- on 15 May 1879, the Moselle line from Koblenz via Cochem to Trier
- on 15 October 1879, the Fischbach Valley Railway from Saarbrücken via Quierschied to Neunkirchen and a link via Scheidt to the former terminus of the Palatine Ludwig Railway at St. Ingbert.
