= Ehrecke =

Ehrecke is a surname. Notable people with the surname include:

- Adolf Ehrecke (1900–1980), German schoolteacher and Nazi Party official
- Rachel Ehrecke (born 1999), American rugby player
