= Walter Jung (Gauleiter) =

German Nazi Party official and newspaper editor (1895–unknown)

Gauleiter of the Saar
- In office 30 May 1926 – 8 December 1926
- Preceded by: Position created
- Succeeded by: Jakob Jung

Personal details
- Born: 8 August 1895 Dudweiler, Rhine Province, Kingdom of Prussia, German Empire
- Died: Unknown
- Party: Nazi Party
- Occupation: Smelting plant official

Walter Jung (8 August 1895 – unknown) was a German who became an early Nazi Party official and newspaper editor. He was the first (unofficial) Gauleiter in the Saar when it was being administered by France and the United Kingdom under a League of Nations mandate. Tried for defamation in 1929, he was expelled from the Party for distancing himself from antisemitic statements in an attempt to avoid punishment, and for criticism of the Party leadership.

== Biography ==
Walter Jung was born in Dudweiler (today, a borough of Saarbrücken) and worked as a smelting plant official there. He lived in his hometown of Dudweiler until 1928 and then moved to Saarbrücken.

On 30 May 1926, at a time when the Nazi Party was still outlawed in the Saar Territory, Jung became the Party's unofficial Gauleiter there and also worked as the editor of the local Nazi weekly Der Saardeutsche. When the ban on the Party was lifted, he officially enrolled as a member of the Saarbrücken Ortsgruppe (local group) on 28 November 1926 (membership number 47,851). However, he was replaced as Gauleiter by Jakob Jung on 8 December 1926. He then became the press officer for Gau Saar from that time until 1928.

In addition to his Party post, Jung continued his involvement in propaganda, working as an editor and freelance contributor to the Völkischer Beobachter, the largest Party newspaper. In June 1928, he also was named editor-in-chief of the new Nazi weekly, Saardeutsche Volksstimme (Saar German People's Voice), but was removed from this post the following year.

On 1 October 1929, Jung was expelled from the Party. This resulted from his statement during a court proceeding against him for defamation on 7 June 1929 in Saarlouis, in which he distanced himself from antisemitic statements attributed to him against Felix Hanau (a Jewish businessman), in an attempt to avoid punishment. Another reason for his expulsion was his criticism of the Party leadership, which he accused of cronyism. He submitted a request for reinstatement to the Party on 2 April 1931, but it subsequently was denied. Little is known about his later life.

== Sources ==
- Gerhard, Paul (1987). Die NSDAP des Saargebietes, 1920-1935: Der Verspätete Aufstieg der NSDAP In der Katholisch-proletarischen Provinz. Saarbrücken: Saarbrücker Druckerei und Verlag (SDV). ISBN 3-925036-11-3.
- Miller, Michael D.; Schulz, Andreas (2017). Gauleiter: The Regional Leaders of the Nazi Party and Their Deputies, 1925–1945. Vol. 2 (Georg Joel – Dr. Bernhard Rust). R. James Bender Publishing. ISBN 978-1-932-97032-6.
