= Karl Brück =

German Nazi Party Gauleiter (1895–1964)

Deputy Kreisleiter, Saarbrücken District
- In office 17 September 1941 – 8 May 1945

Gauleiter of the Saar
- In office 15 September 1931 – 6 May 1933
- Preceded by: Adolf Ehrecke
- Succeeded by: Josef Bürckel

Deputy Gauleiter of the Saar
- In office September 1927 – 15 September 1931

Additional positions
- 1933–1936: Reichstag Deputy

Personal details
- Born: 12 May 1895 Saarbrücken, Rhine Province, Kingdom of Prussia, German Empire
- Died: 8 June 1964 (aged 69) Saarbrücken, Saarland, West Germany
- Party: Nazi Party
- Other political affiliations: Deutschvölkischer Schutz- und Trutzbund
- Occupation: Moldmaker

Military service
- Allegiance: German Empire
- Branch/service: Imperial German Army
- Years of service: 1914–1916
- Rank: Gefreiter
- Battles/wars: World War I
- Awards: Wound Badge

Karl Brück (12 May 1895 – 8 June 1964) was a German Nazi Party official who served as the Party Gauleiter of the Saar between 1931 and 1933 when it was being administered by France and the United Kingdom under a League of Nations mandate. He then worked in various Party positions at the national and regional levels, lastly as the Deputy Kreisleiter (county leader) of the Saarbrücken district from September 1941 until Germany's surrender in May 1945. In 1948, he was sentenced to three years imprisonment by a denazification court.

== Early life ==
Brück, the son of a railway clerk, was born in Saarbrücken and attended Volksschule in Kleinblittersdorf until 1905. He completed a four-year apprenticeship in sand casting and was then employed for five years by various companies as a journeyman molder. From 1912 to 1914, he also was the leader of a 600 member pathfinders corps in Saarbrücken. Very shortly after the outbreak of the First World War, Brück entered military service with the Imperial German Army on 2 August 1914 as a one-year volunteer. From 25 September 1914 to 29 January 1915, he fought on the western front and, from 2 February 1915, on the eastern front with the rank of Gefreiter until he was seriously wounded in the autumn of 1915. He then spent a year recuperating in hospitals and was awarded the Wound Badge.

Discharged from the service, Brück attended a mechanical engineering school in Cologne from 3 October 1916 until December when he legally was required to return to work in support of the war effort, taking a clerical job. From 1920 to 1922, he was a member of the Deutschvölkischer Schutz- und Trutzbund, the largest and most influential antisemitic organization in the Weimar Republic, and served on its board of directors.

== Nazi Party career ==
In February 1922, Brück joined the Nazi Party and became a co-founder and 2nd chairman of the Party's Ortsgruppe (local group) in Saarbrücken. As an early Party member, he was an Alter Kampfer (old fighter) and later was awarded the Golden Party Badge. After the Party was reestablished, following the period of its outlawing in the wake of the Beer Hall Putsch, Brück founded a separate Saar branch of the Party (NSDAP der Saargebiet) in 1926, but then rejoined the national Party on 2 February 1927 (membership number 55,979).

In September 1927, Brück was appointed Ortsgruppenleiter (local group leader) in Saarbrücken and Deputy Gauleiter of Gau Saar, the first holder of this post. On 15 September 1931, he was promoted to Gauleiter, succeeding Adolf Ehrecke. On 13 March 1932, he was elected to what would be the last Landesrat (regional council) in the Saar, as one of two Nazi members of that 30 member advisory body. On 31 January 1933, Adolf Hitler named Josef Bürckel the Beauftragter (representative) of the Nazi Party in the Saar Territory, who then began to take de facto direct control over Party affairs. Brück was marginalized and left the Gauleiter post on 6 May 1933.

On 1 June, Brück became the leader of a department in the Party's Organization Office at Party headquarters in Munich. On 12 November 1933, he was elected to the Reichstag from electoral constituency 21 (Koblenz–Trier). In 1934, he became an organizational director of the united "German Front", an alliance of Saar political parties founded to advocate for unification with Germany in the upcoming plebescite of January 1935. Following the Saar's unification with Germany in March 1935, Brück was made the director of the Social Department of the Mining Administration of the Saar. In January 1936, he left his position in Party headquarters and, on 29 March 1936, he unsuccessfully sought reelection to the Reichstag. From 17 September 1941 until the fall of the Nazi regime in May 1945, he served as Deputy Kreisleiter (county leader) of the Saarbrücken district.

== Post-war life ==
Brück was interned by Allied forces from 1945 to 1948. He subsequently was found guilty in denazification proceedings by a German court in 1948 and sentenced to three years imprisonment. Little is known about details of his later life.

== Sources ==
- Gerhard, Paul (1987). Die NSDAP des Saargebietes, 1920-1935: Der Verspätete Aufstieg der NSDAP In der Katholisch-proletarischen Provinz. Saarbrücken: Saarbrücker Druckerei und Verlag (SDV). ISBN 3-925036-11-3.
- Höffkes, Karl (1986). Hitlers Politische Generale. Die Gauleiter des Dritten Reiches: ein biographisches Nachschlagewerk. Tübingen: Grabert-Verlag. p.36, ISBN 3-87847-163-7.
- Miller, Michael D.; Schulz, Andreas (2012). Gauleiter: The Regional Leaders of the Nazi Party and Their Deputies, 1925–1945. Vol. 1 (Herbert Albrecht – H. Wilhelm Hüttmann). R. James Bender Publishing. ISBN 978-1-932-97021-0.
