= Heimbach (Nahe)–Baumholder railway =

Railway line in Germany

Coordinates: 49.6198°N 7.2735°E

Overview
- Line number: 3200
- Locale: Rhineland-Palatinate

Service
- Route number: 680; 271a (old)

Technical
- Line length: 9 km (5.6 mi)
- Number of tracks: 1
- Track gauge: 1,435 mm (4 ft 8 1/2 in) standard gauge
- Minimum radius: 300 m (980 ft)
- Operating speed: 50 km/h (31.1 mph) (maximum)
- Maximum incline: 1.9%

The Heimbach (Nahe)–Baumholder Railway was opened in 1912. It was formerly used exclusively for freight and military transport, but passenger services were reactivated in February 2015. It links to the Nahe Valley Railway west of Heimbach (Nahe).

== History ==
Approval was given in 1897 to build a short railway from Heimbach to Baumholder. Preparation for the railway began in 1902. In 1908 Prussia passed an act to allow the railway to be built. The railway was open on December 15, 1912. A military training area was built in Baumholder between 1937 and 1938. As a result of this, the line experienced more activity and the number of tracks at the Baumholder station was increased.

The passenger service on the line was stopped on May 31, 1981. After that, this stretch was served by passenger bus, most recently as bus route 322 of the Rhein-Nahe-Nahverkehrsverbund (RNN). There is no public transit service on the weekend. One exception to this was Rheinland-Pfalz Day in 2007. On this occasion there was service from June 29, 2007 to July 1, 2007, the first time since 1981 that there had been rail services on this stretch.

The railway's infrastructure was acquired by the Baumholder Municipality from DB Netz in 2006. Both the sale price of 310,000 Euro and the investment of about 1.5 Million Euro were taken on by the Rhineland-Palatinate government. The yearly operational deficit of 100,000 Euro has been covered by the main users of the line, the US Army and the Bundeswehr with a ratio of 80 to 20. Since December 10, 2006, Rheinland-Pfalz has used DB Schenker Rail for maintenance of the line.

== Reactivation of services ==
The rail authority Rheinland-Pfalz Süd (ZSPNV Süd) decided in its meeting on December 10, 2008 to reactivate the line for passenger service in December 2014. The program is being operated under the Dieselnetzes Südwest and involves hourly service between Baumholder and Kirn. Stops are made in the towns of Heimbach and Ruschberg. Since 23 February 2015, the Regionalbahn RB 34 service has operated between Baumholder and Idar-Oberstein daily every hour; at peak times services are extended to Kirn.

== Locomotives ==
At the beginning of the lines operation, the Prussian Locomotives T9, G8, and G10 were used. Later the Reichsbahn Class 50 and Class 52 were used and for passenger service the Class 38 (Prussian P8) and Class 23 were used. After that DB railbuses Class 795 and Class 798 were used for passenger traffic. After 1975 the military trains used the Diesel Locomotives Class 218 and BR 211/212. Today the DB Class 232 and Class 290 are used.
