= Bexbach station =

Railway station in Bexbach, Germany

Bexbach
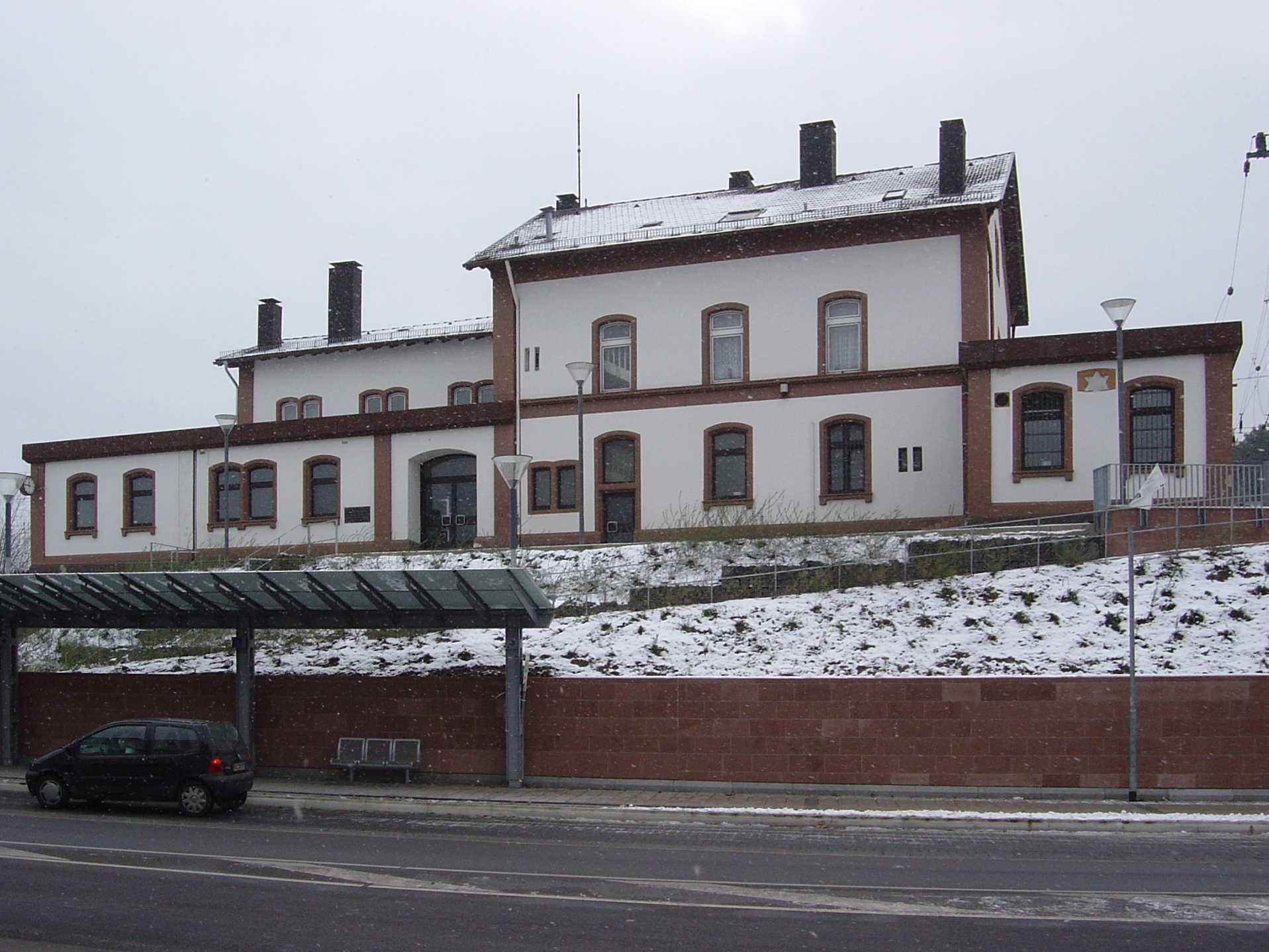
- Bexbach station from the street

General information
- Location: Bahnhofstr. 39, Bexbach, Saarland; Germany
- Coordinates: 49°20′44″N 7°15′15″E
- Lines: Homburg–Neunkirchen (km 7.5) (KBS 683)
- Platforms: 2

Construction
- Accessible: Yes

Other information
- Station code: 609
- DS100 code: SBX
- IBNR: 8000941
- Category: 6
- Fare zone: SaarVV: 511
- Website: www.bahnhof.de

History
- Opened: 1849
Location

Bexbach station is a station in the German state of Saarland. It was opened in 1849 and is the oldest preserved station building in the state, although it has extended in 1872 and 1896. When it was built, Bexbach was in the Circle of the Rhine (Rheinkreis) of the Kingdom of Bavaria. It was put into operation together with Homburg Hauptbahnhof and the Palatine Ludwig Railway (Pfälzische Ludwigsbahn). Homburg station, which was destroyed during the Second World War, received a new entrance building at the beginning of the 1950s, but Bexbach station was preserved. When it was built, it was a border station between Bavaria and Prussia and also the terminus of the historic Palatine Ludwig Railway. Today, it is a through station on the Homburg–Neunkirchen railway. The building and its surrounding area have been given heritage protection.

== History ==
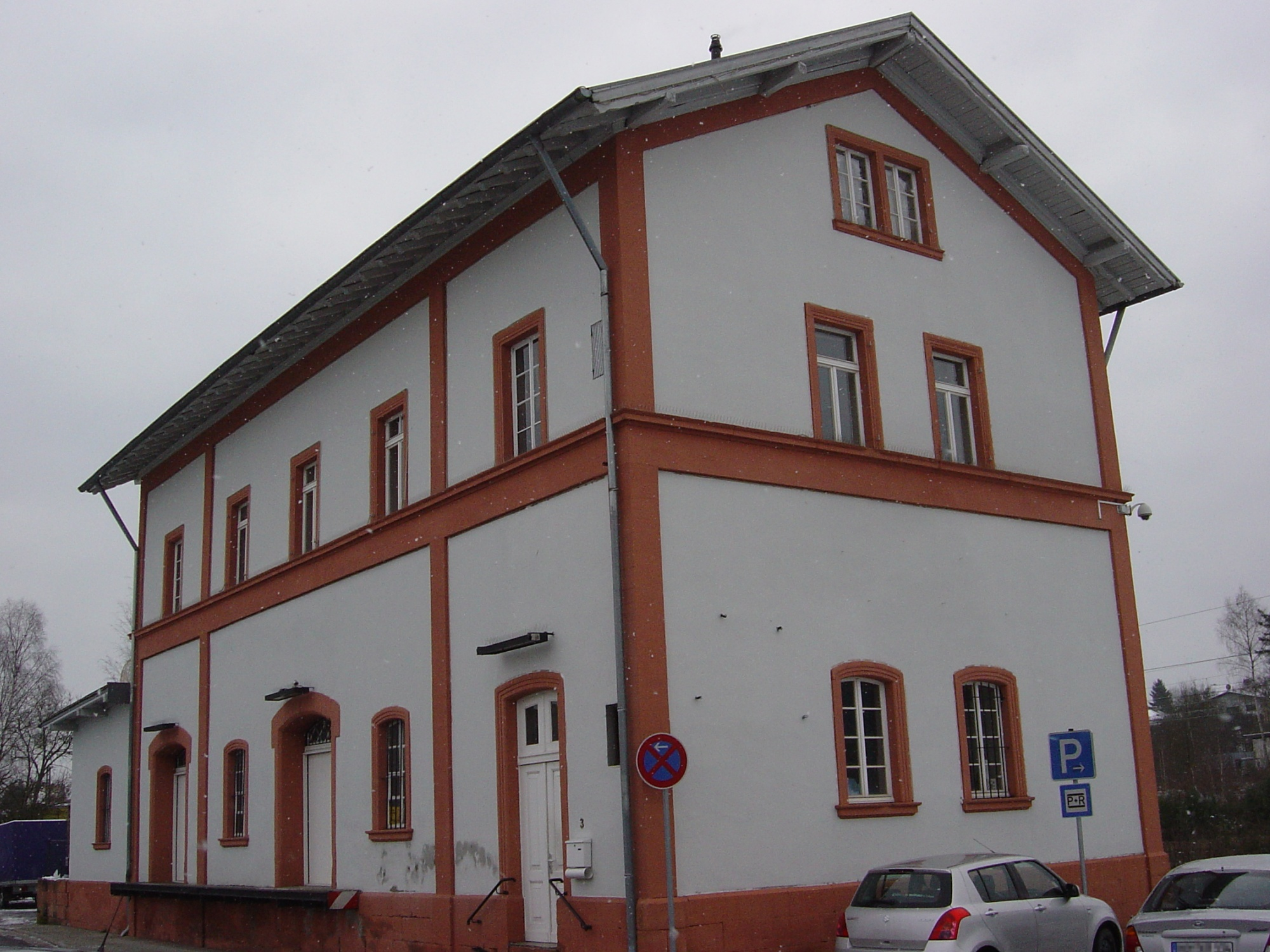
Station goods shed

Land purchases for the railway line and Bexbach station began in 1845. A single-track line was completed to Bexbach in the summer of 1848 and one year later it was extended to the border at Wellesweiler. A year later, the line was connected to the Heinitz colliery on Prussian territory. The most important reason for the construction of the entire line was the transport of coal from the mines located on Bavarian territory in Bexbach, St. Ingbert and (later) also Frankenholz.

For many years coal was transported from the mines to Bexbach station in horse carts and later from Frankenholz by ropeway conveyor. With the closure of the Bexbach and Frankenholz pits in 1959, freight traffic at the Bexbach station drastically declined. Today there are two through tracks, three shunting tracks and a siding with a total of 13 sets of points. The goods shed was built in 1872/73.

In addition, Bexbach station was of great strategic importance as it was the area of the Franco-Prussian War of 1870-71. At the north end of the station, a 500-metre-long loading ramp was built in 1870, which was able to unload more than 50 troop trains a day in the First World War. An equally long loading dock was built in Limbach bei Homburg (Saar) on the Rohrbach–Homburg (Saar) railway and in Blieskastel-Lautzkirchen on the Landau–Rohrbach railway. The line was electrified in 1966.

In the course of the Second World War, work started in 1939 on building a strategic railway from Waldmohr-Jägersburg station on the Glan Valley Railway (Glantalbahn) to Bexbach, bypassing Homburg. This work was abandoned in May 1940.

== Entrance building ==
Originally the two-storey entrance building was built as a simple rectangular building in the Rundbogenstil ("round arch style") similar to those of Kaiserslautern (1848) and Frankenthal (1853). The original plans of the ground plan are no longer available, but recent plans suggest that a central corridor from the "house platform" must have existed from the establishments of the station forecourt. There were ticket office and other offices on the right (east) side. On the left side, a narrow corridor led to the baggage handling and the waiting rooms. The larger of the two was for the 1st and 2nd classes and included a restaurant. At the end of the corridor was the waiting room for the 3rd and 4th classes, which also included a restaurant. The latter room was a separate extension and was accessible through two doors from the street side and the platform. Later in the history of the building all the waiting rooms were removed and replaced by a large hall. The cast iron canopy of the house platform was built around the turn of the century, but it was removed at the latest in the early 1980s during one of the many modifications of the station.

Further renovations took place in the early 1960s and 1977 and the character of the building has largely been destroyed, similar to other Saarland station buildings such as in Luisenthal, Bous, Rohrbach, Lebach and many others. Today, the station building is no longer accessible for public transport operations.

== Current condition ==
There are only minimal service facilities at the station and the station is not adapted for accessibility. In the second half of 2011, the platform was equipped with a dynamic platform display.
