= Gustav Staebe =

German Nazi Party official and propagandist (1906–1983)

Acting Gauleiter of the Saar
- In office 21 April 1929 – 30 July 1929
- Preceded by: Jakob Jung
- Succeeded by: Adolf Ehrecke

Press Chief of the Reich Youth Leadership
- In office 1 January 1934 – 22 November 1934

Regional Administrator, Reich Association of the German Press
- In office 1937 – 8 May 1945

Personal details
- Born: 22 August 1906 Hindenburg (today, Zabrze), Province of Silesia, Kingdom of Prussia, German Empire
- Died: 27 September 1983 (aged 77) Bad Segeberg, Schleswig-Holstein, West Germany
- Party: Nazi Party
- Other political affiliations: Deutschvölkischer Schutz- und Trutzbund
- Occupation: Newspaper editor
- Civilian awards: Golden Party Badge

Military service
- Allegiance: Nazi Germany
- Branch/service: Schutzstaffel; German Army
- Years of service: 1933–1945; 1941–1943
- Rank: SS-Obersturmbannfuhrer; Unteroffizier
- Battles/wars: World War II
- Military awards: War Merit Cross, 1st and 2nd class

Gustav Louis Erich Staebe (22 August 1906 – 27 September 1983) was a German Nazi Party official, and SS-Obersturmbannführer. A skilled propagandist, he was a Party orator and the editor-in-chief of several major Nazi-era newspapers.

== Early life ==
Staebe was born in Hindenburg in Upper Silesia (today, Zabrze, Poland) the son of a police inspector. He attended a Gymnasium in Elbing (today, Elbląg) and then a military cadet academy in Wahlstatt (today, Legnickie Pole). In 1919, at the age of 12, he was arrested for posting antisemitic leaflets. In the same year he joined the Deutschvölkischer Schutz- und Trutzbund, the largest and most influential antisemitic organization in Germany. After attending art school, he underwent a two-year apprenticeship, followed by three years working at a wholesale iron business.

== Nazi Party official ==
In April 1923, Staebe joined the Nazi Party for the first time. The party was temporarily banned following the failed Beer Hall Putsch of November 1923 but, after the ban was lifted, Staebe rejoined it on 9 May 1926 (membership number 36,247). As an early Party member, he would later be awarded the Golden Party Badge. He also joined the Party's paramilitary organization, the Sturmabteilung (SA), at this time. Also, from 1923 to 1926, he was a member of the Young German Order, another large paramilitary association. Soon after, he became a full-time functionary of the Party. From 1926 to 1927, Staebe served as the first Party Kreisleiter (county leader) in the Brunswick Land area, also acting as a Parteiredner (Party speaker). In 1927, he then became Ortsgruppenleiter (local group leader) of Rathenow in Brandenburg. From November 1927 to April 1929, he was the Party Bezirksleiter (district leader) first in Barnim and then in Brunswick Land. On 21 April 1929, following the resignation of Jakob Jung as the Gauleiter of the Saar, Staebe was named Acting Gauleiter, remaining in this post through 30 July when the permanent replacement, Adolf Ehrecke, was named. In August, he took up the post of Bezirksleiter in Rhein-Lahn-Kreis.

== Propaganda functionary ==
When leading the Party in the Saar, Staebe had also served as the editor-in-chief of the Saardeutscher Volksstimme (Saar German Peoples' Voice). Later in 1929, he founded the first Nazi farmers' newspaper Freiheit und Scholl, which was distributed as a supplement to the Nassauer Beobachter (Nassau Observer). From here on, Staebe focused his activities on the areas of press and propaganda. Having served as a Reichsredner (national speaker) for the Party since 1928, he delivered speeches agitating against the Jews and the Weimar Republic, which he attacked as the "moneybag republic", accusing its leaders of leading "a gluttonous gourmet life."

In 1930 Staebe became Gau propaganda leader in Gau Hesse-Nassau Süd, and also served as the Gau's first agricultural specialist. From April 1931 through September 1932, he was the press chief for the Party's Agricultural Policy Department headed by Walther Darré in the Reichsleitung (National Leadership) in Munich. During this same period, he was the editor-in-chief of the National-Sozialistische-Landpost (National Socialist Country Post), a weekly agricultural newspaper he founded. Staebe authored special guidelines for rural propaganda in June 1931, stressing that the peasantry should be provided with "positive ideas about the National Socialist movement" and its policies. He suggested in July 1931 establishing a special cadre of Bauernredner (peasant speakers), since the Party at that time lacked orators specifically trained in agricultural issues of interest to the peasantry.

From 1932 to June 1933, Staebe was a member of the editorial board of the Völkischer Beobachter, the Nazi Party's largest daily newspaper, overseeing the agricultural and political departments. In 1933, he worked for a time as editor-in-chief of the Bremer Nationalsozialist Zeitung (Bremen National Socialist Journal). In addition, he was appointed radio Pressechef (press chief) of the German Western Broadcasting Group. In January 1934, Staebe became the Hitler Youth Regional Leader in Gau Rheinpfalz. He also was named by Reichsjugendführer Baldur von Schirach as Press Chief of the Reich Youth Leadership, holding this position through November 1934. During 1934, Staebe was featured in the press campaign orchestrated by Reichsminister of Propaganda Joseph Goebbels against monarchists, reactionaries and conservative opponents of the regime, as well as those that were labelled "carpers, critics and killjoys." In a nationwide radio broadcast on 24 May 1934, Staebe defined reactionaries as "everybody who is not a convinced National Socialist and is no longer young," asserting that "the future of the new Germany lies only in its youth." From January 1935 to 1937, he was Editor-in-Chief of the Mainzer Anzeiger (Mainz Gazette). This was followed by the same position for the Frankfurter Volksblatt, (Frankfurt People's Sheet) a paper founded by Jakob Sprenger, the Gauleiter of Gau Hesse-Nassau. Staebe retained this position through the end of the Nazi regime in May 1945. He concurrently sat on the State Farmers' Council in Hesse-Nassau and was the regional leader for the Reich Association of the German Press from 1937 to May 1945.

== SS and military service ==
On 1 July 1933, Staebe joined the SS (membership number 36,140). He was assigned to the SD Main Office, (which in 1939 would become part of the Reich Security Main Office) and served from July through December 1933 as the SD leader in the Bremen area. He attained the rank of SS-Obersturmbannführer on 30 January 1939. In March 1936 and April 1938, he was unsuccessfully proposed for election to the Reichstag. In 1941, Staebe was called up for military service with the German Army as a Sonderführer with the rank of Unteroffizier. He became the editor-in-chief of a frontline newspaper, and was discharged from the service on 22 March 1943. During the war, he was awarded the War Merit Cross, 1st and 2nd class.

== Postwar life ==
At the end of the war in Europe in May 1945, Staebe was arrested by U.S. Army forces near Gelnhausen and interned in a camp in Darmstadt. He underwent denazification proceedings and received a lenient sentence. He resumed a career in journalism as an editor for the Segeberger Zeitung (Segeberg Journal).

== Sources ==
- Höffkes, Karl (1986). Hitlers Politische Generale. Die Gauleiter des Dritten Reiches: ein biographisches Nachschlagewerk. Tübingen: Grabert-Verlag. ISBN 3-87847-163-7.
- Miller, Michael D.; Schulz, Andreas (2021). Gauleiter: The Regional Leaders of the Nazi Party and Their Deputies, 1925–1945. Vol. 3 (Fritz Sauckel - Hans Zimmermann). Fonthill Media. ISBN 978-1-781-55826-3.
- Pridham, Geoffrey (1973). Hitler's Rise to Power: The Nazi Movement in Bavaria, 1923-1933. New York: Harper & Row. ISBN 978-0-061-36116-6.
