= Arastu Yar Jung =

Indian doctor (1858–1940)

- Born: 10 June 1858
- Died: 25 March 1940 (age 81); Hyderabad State, [lBritish India
- Known for: First Surgeon to Asaf Jah VI
- Scientific career
- Fields: Physician
- Workplaces: Osmania General Hospital

Nawab Arastu Yar Jung (10 June 1858 – 25 March 1940) (Arabic: نواب أرسطو يار جنگ) was a Hyderabadi surgeon.

He became well known during late Nizam period of Hyderabad, during the early 20th century, for being chief physician and advisor to the Nizam of the time, Mahbub Ali Khan, Asaf Jah VI.

== Bibliography ==
- Proceedings of the annual conference

By Alabama Home Economics Association, Association of Assistant Librarians. Scottish Division, Conference, Irish Accounting and Finance Association Published by University of Ulster, 1986 page 271

- History of Hyderabad District, 1879-1950 A.D., Yugabda 4981-5052

By Mukkamala Radhakrishna Sarma, Krishna Damodar Abhyankar, S. G. Moghe Published by Bharatiya Itihasa Sankalana Samiti, 1987 Item notes: v. 2 Original from the University of Michigan Digitized 3 September 2008.

Dr. Arastu Yar Jung: A short biography of the royal physician to the Nizams with the history of medical advances in Hyderabad Deccan during his lifetime. (b. 1858 - d. 1940) by Dr. Naveed Hussain (Author), Tasneem Ebrahim Hussain (Editor), Aamir N Hussain (Editor) Publisher : Independently published (July 29, 2019); Language : English ISBN 978-1-0793-5063-0
