= Rémilly–Saarbrücken railway =

Railway line in France and Germany

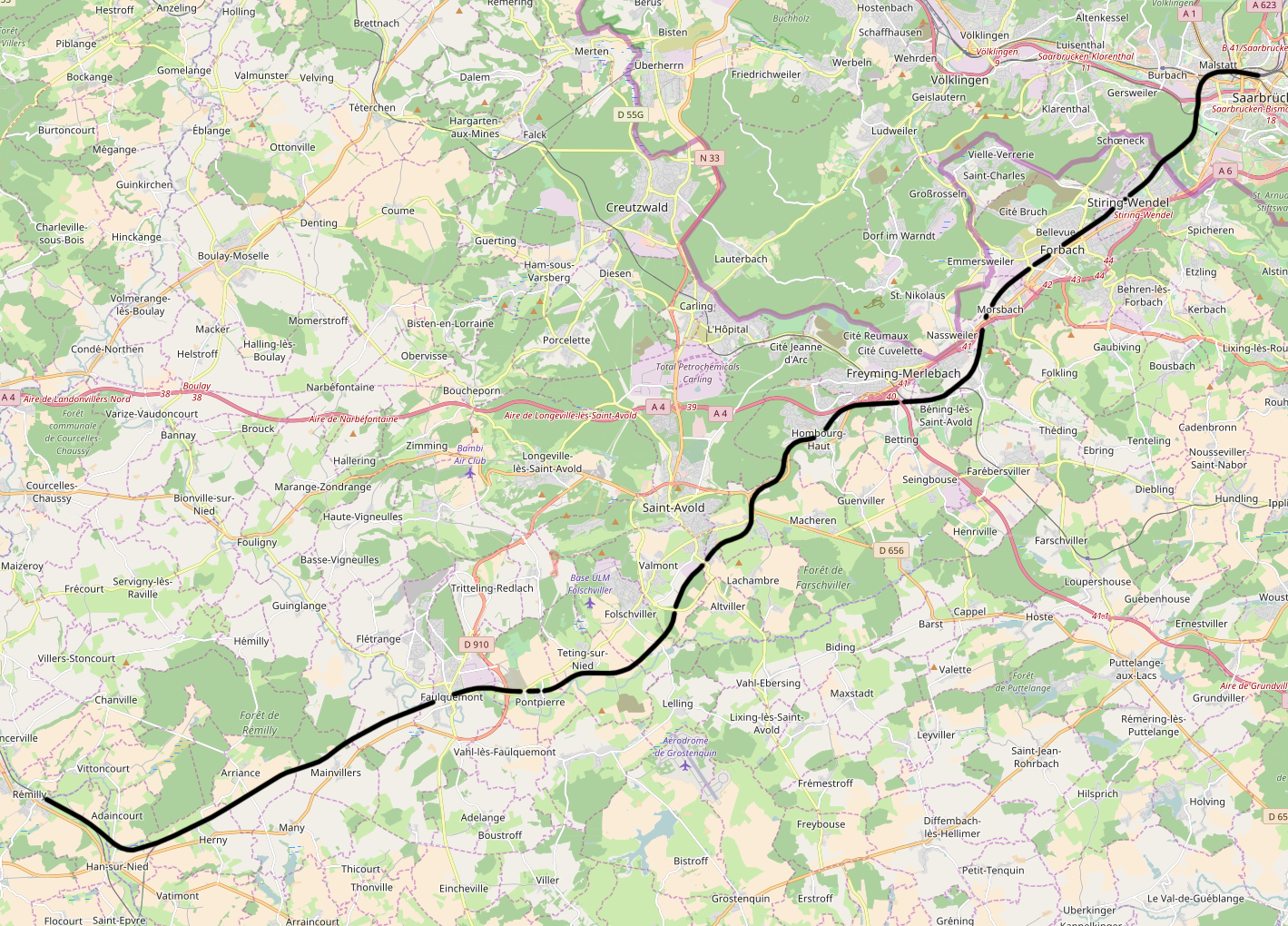

Overview
- Status: Operational
- Owner: RFF / Deutsche Bahn
- Locale: France (Grand Est); Germany (Saarland)
- Termini: Gare de Rémilly; Saarbrücken Hauptbahnhof

Service
- System: SNCF / Deutsche Bahn
- Operator(s): SNCF / Deutsche Bahn

History
- Opened: 1851-1852

Technical
- Line length: 55 km (34 mi)
- Number of tracks: Double track
- Track gauge: 1,435 mm (4 ft 8 1/2 in) standard gauge
- Electrification: 25 kV 50 Hz

The railway from Rémilly to Saarbrücken is a French and German 55-kilometre long railway line, that connects the French Grand Est region to the German city Saarbrücken. The railway was opened between 1851 and 1852. It is part of the international railway connection between Paris and Frankfurt am Main.

== Route ==
The line branches off the Metz–Réding railway at Rémilly, and leaves it in a northeasterly direction. It crosses the industrial area around Saint-Avold and Forbach. It passes the German border, crosses the river Saar and joins the line from Trier to Saarbrücken after about 55 km.

=== Main stations ===
The main stations on the Rémilly–Saarbrücken railway are:

- Gare de Rémilly
- Gare de Forbach
- Saarbrücken Hauptbahnhof

== Services ==
The Rémilly–Saarbrücken railway is used by the following passenger services:

- Intercity-Express from Paris to Frankfurt am Main
- TER Grand Est regional services
