= Adolf Ehrecke =

German schoolteacher and Nazi Party official (1900–1980)

Gauleiter of the Saar
- In office 30 July 1929 – 1 September 1931
- Preceded by: Gustav Staebe
- Succeeded by: Karl Brück

Personal details
- Born: 14 January 1900 Ochsenfurt, Kingdom of Bavaria, German Empire
- Died: 12 April 1980 (aged 80) Inzell, Bavaria, West Germany
- Party: Nazi Party
- Occupation: Schoolteacher

Adolf Ehrecke (14 January 1900 – 12 April 1980) was a German schoolteacher and Nazi Party official who served as the Gauleiter in the Saar from 1929 to 1931 when it was being administered by France and the United Kingdom under a League of Nations mandate. Removed from the educational service and expelled from the Saar for antisemitic propaganda activities, he moved to Kiel where he resumed his career as an educator. During the Second World War, he served as an educational official in the occupied Netherlands. Little is documented about his post-war life.

== Life ==
Adolf Ehrecke was born at Ochsenfurt in Bavaria and attended the Naval Technical School for Administration and Economics. He became a member of the Nazi Party Ortsgruppe (local group) in Nuremberg on 1 April 1925 (membership number 458). His early entry into the Party would later entitle him to be awarded the Golden Party Badge. He joined the Sturmabteilung (SA), the Party's paramilitary organization, in 1926. He advanced in the Party organization, being named an Ortsgruppenleiter in 1929. Also in 1929, he was appointed a Studienassessor (probationary teacher in the civil service) but, later that year, the Governing Commission of the Saar suspended him from this teaching position for political agitation.

Ehrecke was appointed to the post of Gauleiter in the Saar by Adolf Hitler on 31 July 1929, succeeding the acting Gauleiter, Gustav Staebe. At that year's Nuremberg rally (1-4 August 1929), Hitler charged Ehrecke with reorganizing and reinvigorating the Party organization in the Saar region. Over the following two years, under Ehrecke's leadership, the local group grew and became more active than under his predecessors. On 1 June 1930, he became an early member of the National Socialist Teachers League (membership number 252). However, on 31 March 1931, due to his involvement in antisemitic propaganda, he was officially expelled from the educational service by the Saar's Governing Commission. This was followed on 20 June 1931 by denial of a residence permit and his expulsion from the Saar territory by the Governing Commission. On 1 September 1931, at his own request, Ehrecke formally stepped down from his Gauleiter position and was succeeded by Karl Brück.

Moving to Kiel in Germany, he obtained a teaching position and was employed from 1931 through 1944 as an educator there and in Görlitz, where he also became a member of the Stadtschulrat (city school board). From 1944 to 1945, he was an official of the School Supervision Service for Elementary and Middle Schools in the occupied Netherlands, under Reichskommissar Artur Seyss-Inquart. Little is known of his postwar life, and he died in Inzell in 1980.

== Sources ==
- Gerhard, Paul (1987). Die NSDAP des Saargebietes, 1920-1935: Der Verspätete Aufstieg der NSDAP In der Katholisch-proletarischen Provinz. Saarbrücken: Saarbrücker Druckerei und Verlag (SDV). ISBN 3-925036-11-3.
- Höffkes, Karl (1986). Hitlers Politische Generale. Die Gauleiter des Dritten Reiches: ein biographisches Nachschlagewerk. Tübingen: Grabert-Verlag. ISBN 3-87847-163-7.
- Miller, Michael D.; Schulz, Andreas (2012). Gauleiter: The Regional Leaders of the Nazi Party and Their Deputies, 1925–1945. Vol. 1 (Herbert Albrecht – H. Wilhelm Hüttmann). R. James Bender Publishing. ISBN 978-1-932-97021-0.
