= Homburg–Neunkirchen railway =

Railway line in Germany

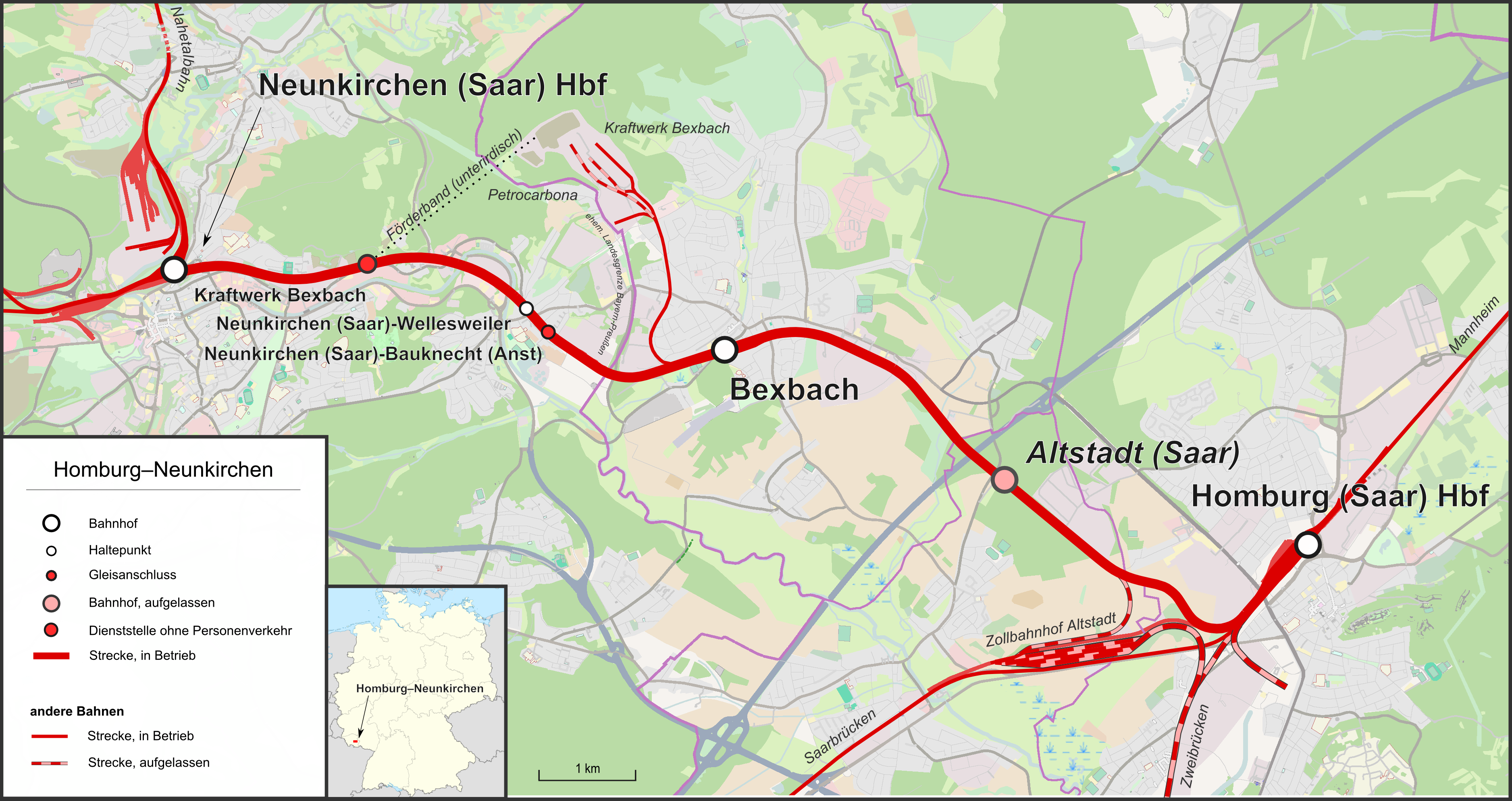

Overview
- Line number: 3282 Homburg–Neunkirchen; 3275 Bexbach–Bexbach power station; 3286 Neunkirchen–Bexbach power station
- Locale: Saarland, Germany

Service
- Route number: 683

Technical
- Line length: 13.6 km (8.5 mi)
- Track gauge: 1,435 mm (4 ft 8 1/2 in) standard gauge
- Electrification: 15 kV/16.7 Hz AC Overhead catenary

The Homburg–Neunkirchen railway is a two-track, electrified railway main line in the German state of Saarland. It connects Homburg on the Mannheim–Saarbrücken railway (historically called the Pfälzische Ludwigsbahn— Palatine Ludwig Railway) and Neunkirchen on the Nahe Valley Railway (Nahetalbahn).

Historically, the Homburg–Bexbach section was in Bavaria and was built as part of the Palatine Ludwig Railway. The Wellesweiler– Neunkirchen section was built as part of the Neunkirchen–Neunkirchen-Heinitz railway, which served collieries in an area that was then part of Prussia.

== Route ==
The Palatine Ludwig Railway divides into two branches in Homburg Hauptbahnhof. Originally, the route ran to Bexbach, where it connected to the Prussian colliery branch line to Neunkirchen, which was later connected to the Nahe Valley Railway.

The modern route of the Palatine Ludwig Railway was built in 1866/7 from Homburg to St. Ingbert and extended to Saarbrücken in 1879.

== History ==
On 10 January 1838, a provisional company was formed to build the line from Rheinschanze (renamed Ludwigshafen in 1865) to Bexbach. On 30 March of that year, the company was formally established as the Bayerische Eisenbahngesellschaft der Pfalz-Rheinschanz-Bexbacher Bahn (Bavarian Railway Company of the Palatine-Rheinschanz–Bexbach Railway). In May 1844, the company was finally renamed as the Palatine Ludwig Railway Company.

From the end of March 1845, the construction of the line was directed by Paul Camille von Denis, at that time one of the leading pioneers of Germany's railways. It served primarily as a means for transporting Saar coal from the Bexbach area for the Bavarian government to the port and trading centre of Rheinschanze. The line was named after the Bavarian King Ludwig I. In addition, it was agreed to connect Rheinschanze to the Bavarian Rhine district, by means of a branch from the line at Schifferstadt to Speyer.

The section from Homburg to Bexbach, which was located on Bavarian territory, opened on 6 June 1849. Bexbach station is the oldest, still existing station in the Saarland.

The Prussian section of the line from Neunkirchen to Wellesweiler was put into operation on 20 October 1850.

In July 1856, the line was duplicated over its entire length between Ludwigshafen and Neunkirchen.

After the First World War the Saar came under the administration of the League of Nations. So in 1920, this line came under the administration of the Saar Railway (Saareisenbahn). With the inclusion of the Saar region in Germany in 1935, the line was taken over by Deutsche Reichsbahn.

=== Developments after the Second World War (1945) ===
After the Second World War, the line returned to its own administration, this time called the Railways of the Saarland (Eisenbahnen des Saarlandes, EdS). The EdS was incorporated in Deutsche Bundesbahn in 1957 with the inclusion of the Saarland in the Federal Republic of Germany.
