= Jakob Jung =

German Nazi Party official (1895–unknown)

Bürgermeister of Gersweiler
- In office March 1935 – Unknown

Gauleiter of the Saar
- In office 8 December 1926 – 21 April 1929
- Preceded by: Walter Jung
- Succeeded by: Gustav Staebe

Personal details
- Born: 27 October 1895 Rückweiler, Rhenish Palatinate, Bavaria, German Empire
- Died: Unknown
- Party: Nazi Party
- Occupation: Municipal administrator
- Awards: Golden Party Badge; Nazi Party Long Service Award, in bronze and silver

Jakob Jung (27 October 1895 – unknown) was a German Nazi Party official who served in its early days as the Gauleiter of the Saar between 1926 and 1929, when it was being administered by France and the United Kingdom under a League of Nations mandate. After the Nazi seizure of power and the subsequent return of the Saar to Germany in March 1935, Jung was appointed the Bürgermeister of Gersweiler (today, a district of Saarbrücken).

== Life ==
Jakob Jung was born in Rückweiler in the Birkenfeld district of the Rhenish Palatinate and later lived in Sankt Arnual (today, part of Saarbrücken). He worked as an administrative assistant in the mayoral office in Brebach (today, also part of Saarbrücken).

On 30 May 1926, Jung assumed the role of Ortsgruppenleiter (local group leader) for the Nazi Party in Saarbrücken. On 29 November 1926, he formally was approved for membership in the Party (membership number 47,862). This was followed, on 8 December 1926, by his appointment as the first official Ortsgruppenleiter of Saarbrücken, as well as the Gauleiter for the entire Saar region. He succeeded Walter Jung, who had unofficially headed the Party in the Saar region up to that point, and he was confirmed in these posts on 1 January 1927 by Adolf Hitler.

On 13 March 1927, Jung co-founded an Ortsgruppe in Überherrn. On 21 April 1929, he resigned his posts in an internal policy dispute within the Saar branch of the Party over the question of opposition to the occupation authorities. He was opposed by his Party comrade and rival Otto Fried, who favored a harder line and accused Jung of cowardice.

Jung remained a Party member and, as an Alter Kampfer (old fighter), was later awarded the Golden Party Badge and the Nazi Party Long Service Award in bronze and in silver. After the Saar was returned to Germany on 1 March 1935 as a result of the Saar referendum, Jung was appointed Bürgermeister (mayor) of Gersweiler (today, a district of Saarbrücken). Nothing further is known of his subsequent life.

== Sources ==
- Gerhard, Paul (1987). Die NSDAP des Saargebietes, 1920-1935: Der Verspätete Aufstieg der NSDAP in der Katholisch-proletarischen Provinz. Saarbrücken: Saarbrücker Druckerei und Verlag (SDV). ISBN 3-925036-11-3.
- Höffkes, Karl (1986). Hitlers Politische Generale. Die Gauleiter des Dritten Reiches: ein biographisches Nachschlagewerk. Tübingen: Grabert-Verlag. ISBN 3-87847-163-7.
- Miller, Michael D.; Schulz, Andreas (2017). Gauleiter: The Regional Leaders of the Nazi Party and Their Deputies, 1925–1945. Vol. 2 (Georg Joel – Dr. Bernhard Rust). R. James Bender Publishing. ISBN 978-1-932-97032-6.
