= Rémilly, Moselle =

Rémilly
- Commune
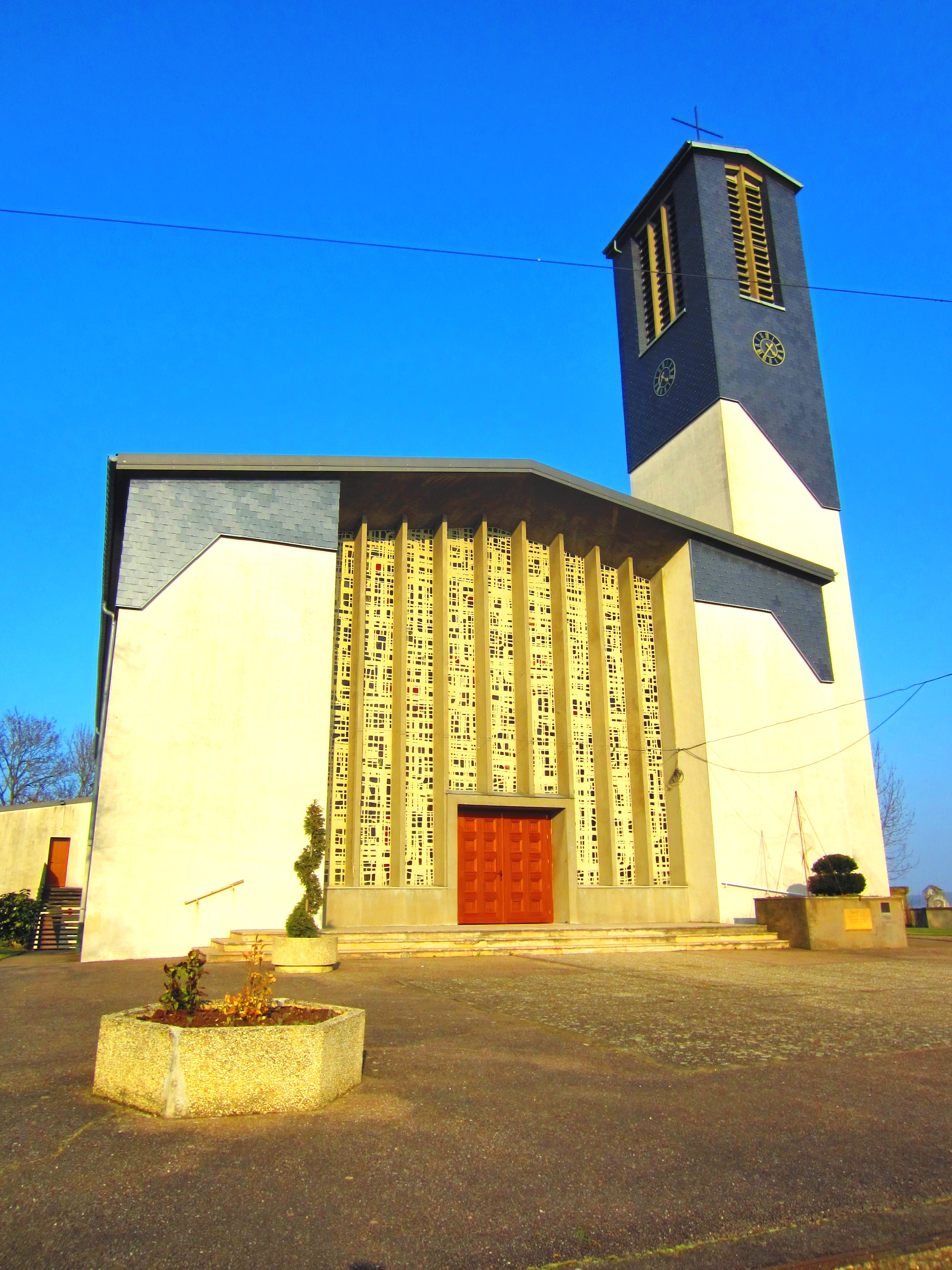
- The church in Rémilly

- Coat of arms
- Location of Rémilly
- Location within France Location within Grand Est
- Coordinates: 49°00′51″N 6°23′37″E
- Country: France
- Region: Grand Est
- Department: Moselle
- Arrondissement: Metz
- Canton: Faulquemont
- Intercommunality: CC Sud Messin

Government
  - Mayor (2024–2026): Philippe Ostrogorski
- Area^{1}: 18.94 km^{2} (7.31 sq mi)
- Highest elevation: 312 m (1,024 ft)
- Lowest elevation: 220 m (720 ft)
- Population (2023): 2,070
  - Density: 109/km^{2} (283/sq mi)
- Time zone: UTC+01:00 (CET)
  - Summer (DST): UTC+02:00 (CEST)
- INSEE/Postal code: 57572 /57580
- ^{1} French Land Register data, which excludes lakes, ponds, glaciers > 1 km^{2} (0.386 sq mi or 247 acres) and river estuaries.

Rémilly (French pronunciation: [ʁemiji]; German: Remelach) is a commune in the Moselle department in Grand Est in north-eastern France.

== Population ==
Historical population
Year	Pop.	±% p.a.
1968	1,423	—
1975	1,556	+1.28%
1982	1,666	+0.98%
1990	1,779	+0.82%
1999	1,813	+0.21%
2007	2,029	+1.42%
2012	2,146	+1.13%
2017	2,016	−1.24%
2023	2,070	+0.44%
Source: INSEE

== See also ==
- Communes of the Moselle department
