= Dudweiler =

- Stadtteil of Saarbrücken
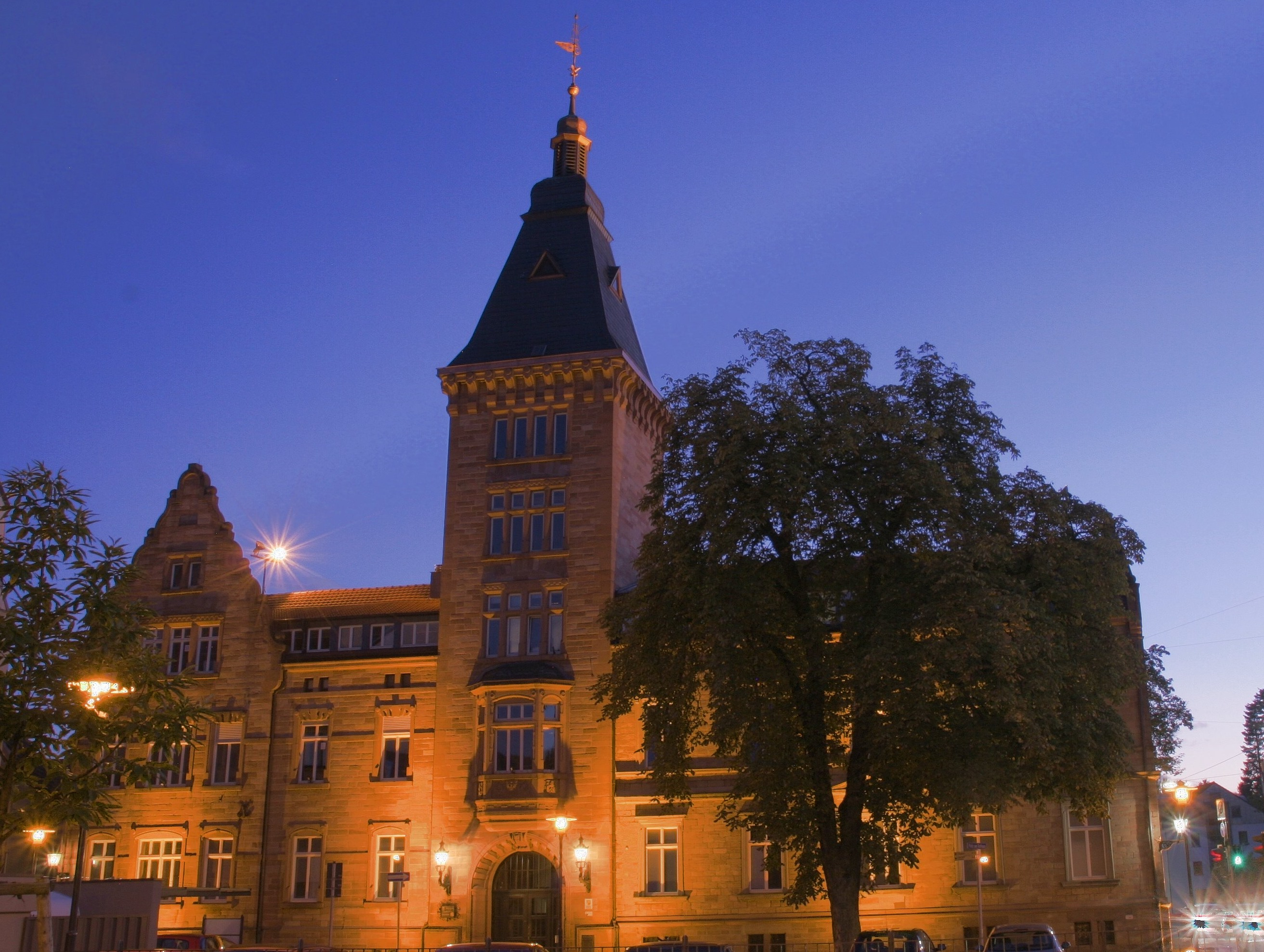
- Town hall

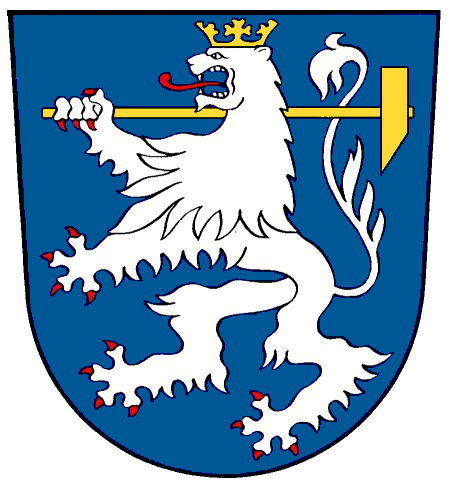
- Coat of arms
- Interactive map of Dudweiler
- Location within Germany Location within Saarland
- Coordinates: 49°16′37″N 7°01′52″E
- Country: Germany
- State: Saarland
- District: Saarbrücken
- Town: Saarbrücken

Population (2020)
  - Total: 19,335
- Time zone: UTC+01:00 (CET)
  - Summer (DST): UTC+02:00 (CEST)
- Postal codes: 66125
- Dialling codes: 06897
- Vehicle registration: SB

Dudweiler (German: [ˈdʊtvaɪlɐ]) is a borough of Saarbrücken, on the Sulzbach creek. In 977, Dudweiler was first mentioned in official documents of German Emperor Otto II as the location of a chapel (Duodonisvillare).

Dudweiler received town privileges on 12 September 1962. In 1974 it was incorporated into the city of Saarbrücken.

Since then, Dudweiler has also been the name of one of the four city districts (Stadtbezirke) of Saarbrücken. The district of Dudweiler comprises four city boroughs (Stadtteile): Dudweiler, Herrensohr, Jägersfreude (both were boroughs of Dudweiler before 1974), and Scheidt (a municipality in the amt of Brebach before 1974).

The coal mining industry played an important role for the growth of Dudweiler until 1968 when the last mine was closed. Today Dudweiler is characterised by its proximity to the Saarland University campus.

Historical population
Year	Pop.	±% p.a.
1542	about 150	—
1905	16,320	—
1974	29,094	+0.84%
2009	19,662	−1.11%
2020	19,335	−0.15%

== Sister cities ==
- Duttweiler, a borough of Neustadt an der Weinstraße, Germany
- Saint-Avold, France
