= European theatre of World War II =

Theatre of military operations during World War II

- Part of World War II
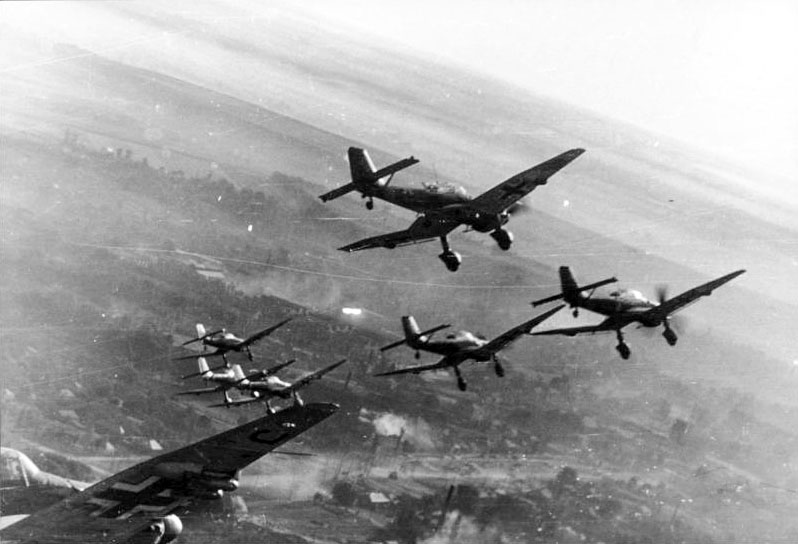
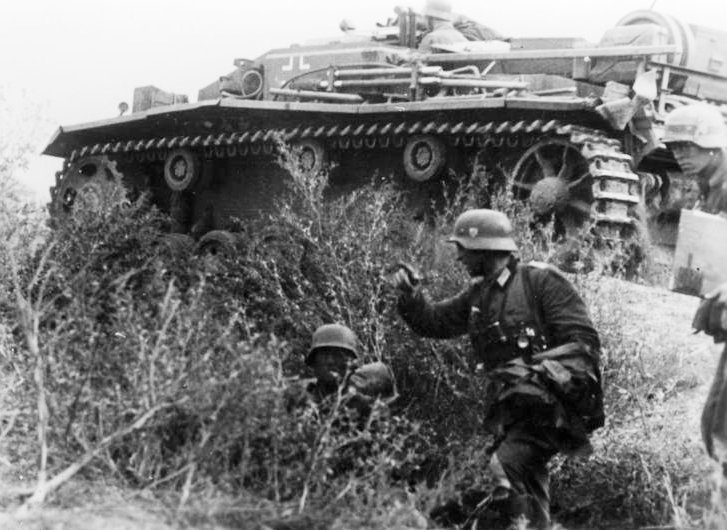
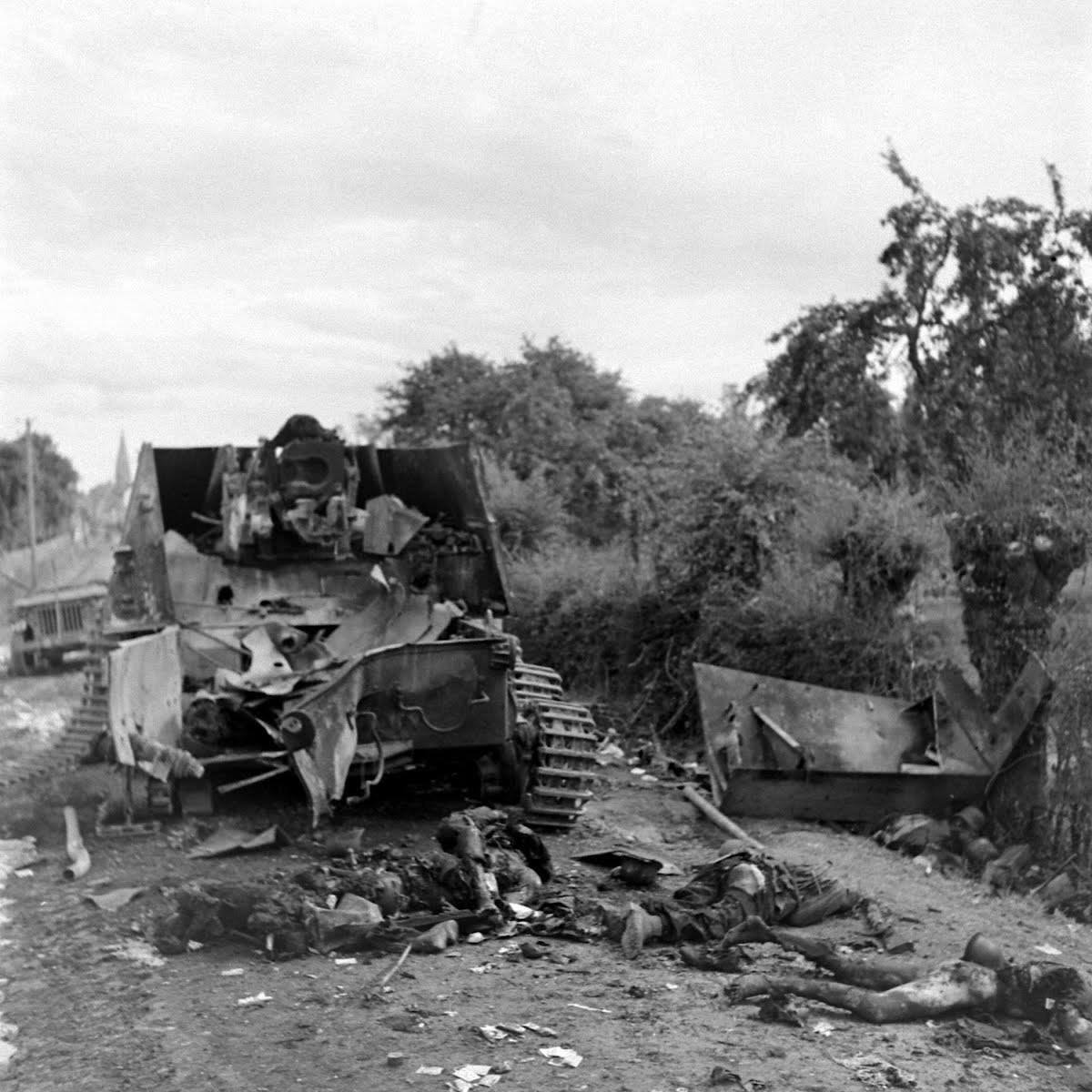
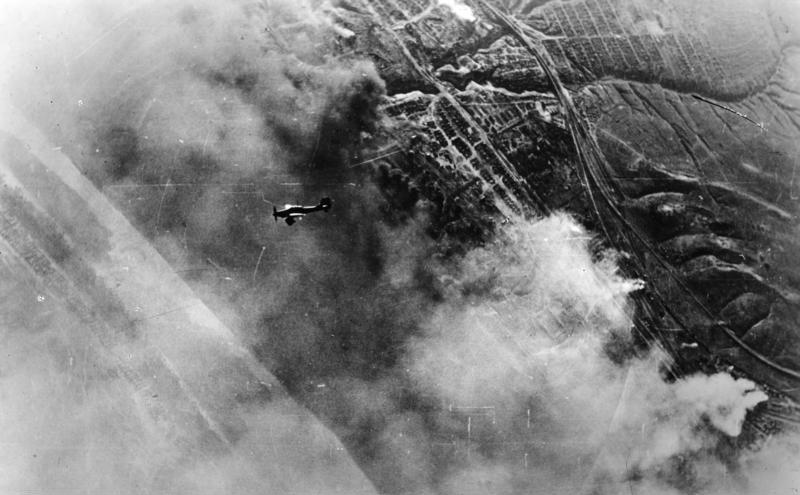
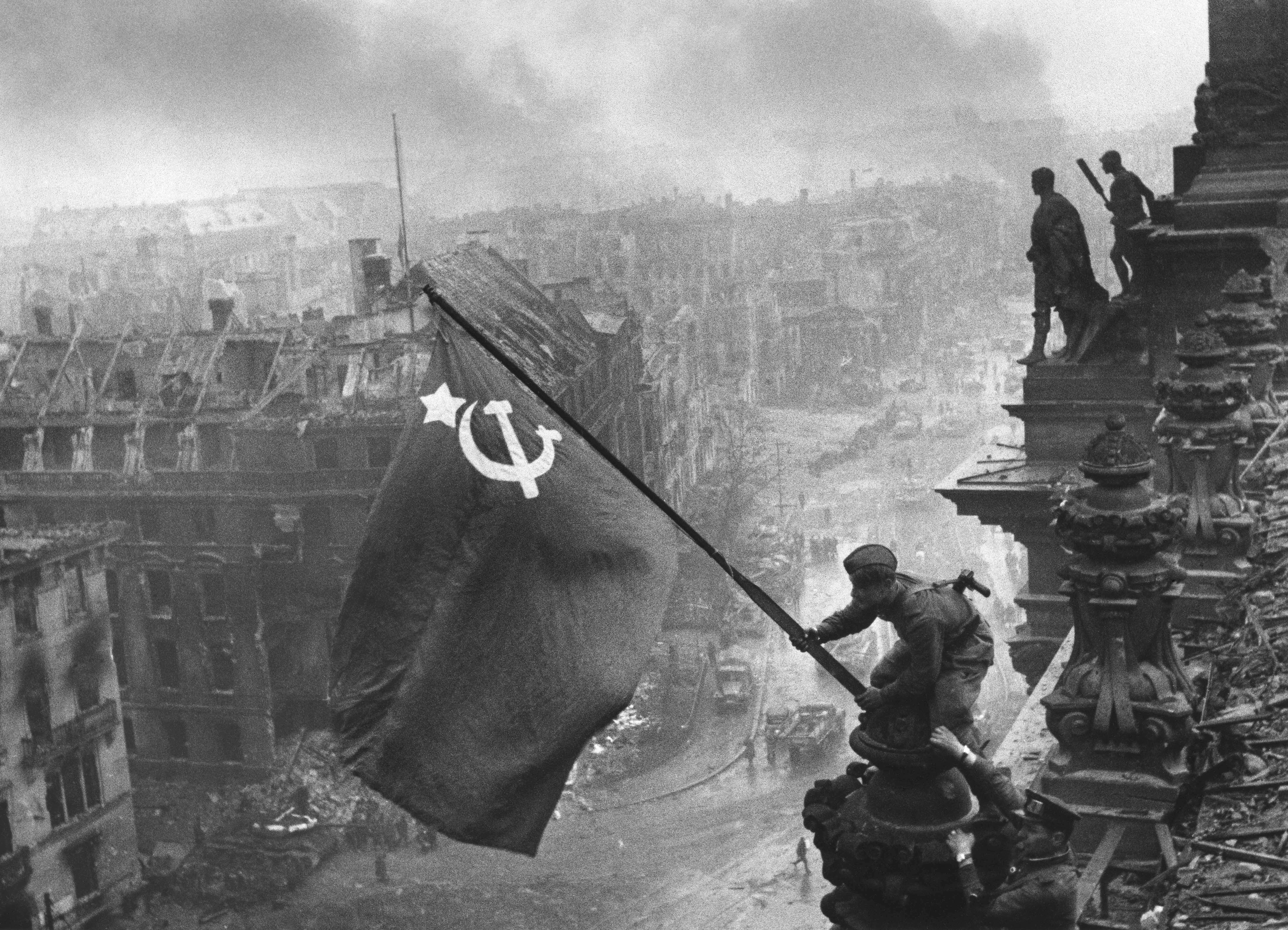
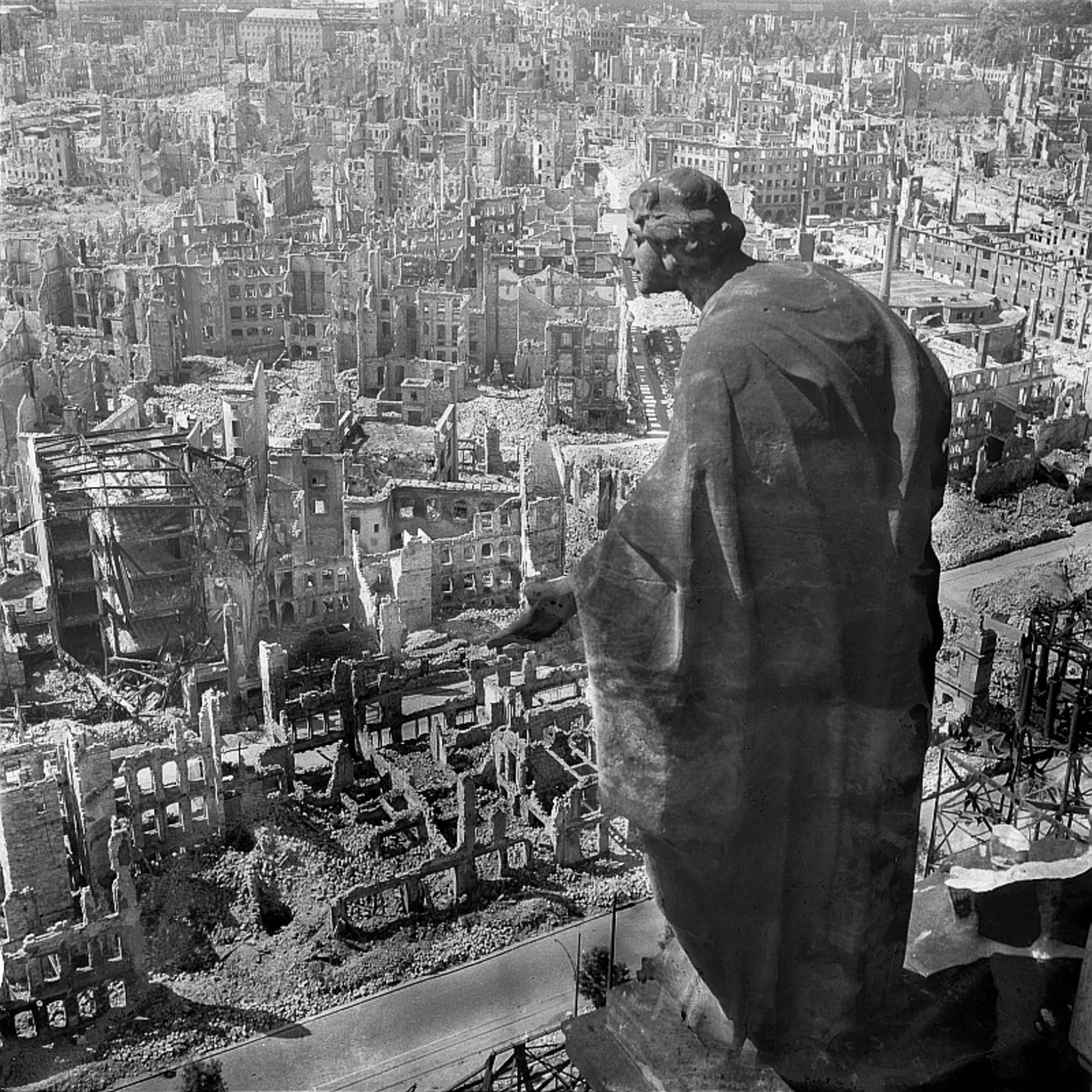
- From left to right, top to bottom: German Stuka dive bombers on the Eastern Front, 1943; German soldiers take position near a Sturmgeschütz III on the Eastern Front, 1942; Destroyed German Hummel and crew in the Falaise pocket during the Normandy campaign, 1944; Stuka flying over Stalingrad, 1942; Soviet soldier raising a flag over the Reichstag after the Battle of Berlin, 1945; Destruction after Allied bombing of Dresden, 1945
Date	1 September 1939 – 25 May 1945 (5 years, 8 months, 3 weeks and 3 days)
Location	Europe and adjoining regions
Result	Allied victory

Belligerents
Allies: Soviet Union (Note: From 1941 (Operation Barbarossa)); United States (Note: From 1941 (German declaration of war on the United States)); United Kingdom; France (Note: FTR until 1940.; Free France 1940-1944.; PGFR from 1944.); (and others)	Axis: Germany (Note: until 15 May 1945); Italy (Note: Until the Armistice of Cassibile, 8 September 1943); Romania (Note: Until 23 August 1944.); Hungary (Note: Kingdom of Hungary until 1944; German occupation of Hungary in 1944; GONU from 1944.); Bulgaria (Note: Until 9 September 1944); (and others)

Commanders and leaders
(Soviet Union) Joseph Stalin; (Soviet Union) Georgy Zhukov; (United States) Franklin D. Roosevelt #; (United States) Harry S. Truman; (United Kingdom) Neville Chamberlain; (United Kingdom) Winston Churchill; (French Third Republic) Édouard Daladier; (Provisional Government of the French Republic) Charles de Gaulle	(Nazi Germany) Adolf Hitler ‡‡; (Nazi Germany) Karl Dönitz; (Kingdom of Italy) Benito Mussolini (executed); (Kingdom of Romania) Ion Antonescu (executed); (Kingdom of Hungary (1920–1946)) Miklós Horthy; (Kingdom of Hungary (1920–1946)) Ferenc Szálasi (executed); (Tsardom of Bulgaria (1908–1946)) Boris III #

Strength
44,150,000+ total	(Nazi Germany) 18,000,000+ total (Fascist Italy) 2,560,000 total

Casualties and losses
Killed: 9,007,590–10,338,576; Captured: 5,778,680 (Note: Ellis: Norwegian: 2,000 killed or missing with no information provided on those wounded or captured; Dutch: 2,890 killed or missing, 6,900 wounded, with no information provided on those captured; Belgian: 7,500 killed or missing, 15,850 wounded, and 200,000 captured; French: 120,000 killed or missing, 250,000 wounded, and 1,450,000 taken prisoner; British: 11,010 killed or missing, 14,070 wounded (only those who were evacuated have been counted), and 41,340 taken prisoner.) (Note: Ellis's numbers: American: 109,820 killed or missing, 356,660 wounded, and 56,630 captured; British: 30,280 killed or missing, 96,670 wounded, 14,700 captured; Canadian: 10,740 killed or missing, 30,910 wounded, 2,250 captured; French: 12,590 killed or missing, 49,510 wounded, 4,730 captured; Polish: 1,160 killed or missing, 3,840 wounded, 370 captured. Thus according to Ellis' information, the Western Allies incurred 783,860 casualties.; US Army Air Forces breakdown: According to a post-war US Army study using war records, the army and army air forces of the United States suffered 586,628 casualties in western Europe, including 116,991 killed in action and 381,350 wounded, of whom 16,264 later died of their wounds.; Total US casualties come to 133,255 killed, 365,086 wounded, 73,759 captured, and 14,528 missing, 2,000 of whom were later declared dead.)	Killed: 5,406,110–5,798,110 (Note: 43,110 Germans killed or missing, 111,640 wounded, no information is provided on any who were captured. Italian losses amounted to 1,250 killed or missing, 4,780 wounded, and no information is provided on any who were captured.); Captured: 8,709,840 (Note: Total German casualties between September 1939 to 31 December 1944, on the Western Front for both the army, Waffen SS, and foreign volunteers amounts to 128,030 killed, 399,860 wounded. 7,614,790 were held in POW camps by early June 1945 (including 3,404,950 who were disarmed following the surrender of Germany). See also: Disarmed Enemy Forces)
- 19,650,000–25,650,000 civilians killed (Note: All totals listed only include direct deaths due to military activity and crimes against humanity, including the Holocaust. Germany: 910,000. 410,000 in Allied strategic bombing, 300,000 in the Holocaust not including Austrian civilian deaths or deaths from the Nazi T4 program. Counting the Aktion T4 program adds 200,000+ deaths to the total. France: 390,000. Includes 77,000 French Jews in the Holocaust. Netherlands: 187,300. Includes 100,000 Dutch Jews in the Holocaust. Belgium: 76,000. Includes 27,000 Belgian Jews in the Holocaust. United Kingdom: 67,200. Mostly died in German bombing. Norway: 8,200. Includes 800 Norwegian Jews in the Holocaust. Denmark: 6,000. Luxembourg: 5,000. Includes 2,000 Luxembourgish Jews.)

The European theatre of World War II, lasting from September 1939 to May 1945, was one of two main theatres of combat during World War II, the other being the Pacific War. The combat in Europe resulted in at least 39 million deaths, and a dramatic change in the balance of power on the continent. The Allied powers, including (for most of the war) the United Kingdom, United States, Soviet Union, and France, fought the Axis powers, including the fascist states of Nazi Germany and Italy, on multiple fronts: Western, Eastern, Scandinavian, and Mediterranean. Germany, meanwhile, enacted the Holocaust, a genocide of six million Jews, within its vast occupied territories across Europe.

In 1938, German dictator Adolf Hitler had his country annex Austria and part of Czechoslovakia; this was motivated in part by the Nazi Party's racist ideology, which held that Germany needed to gain "living space" for its so-called "Aryan race" to survive. The country was supported by Italy, led by dictator Benito Mussolini. World War II began with Germany's invasion of Poland on 1 September 1939. Poland's allies, France and the U.K., declared war on Germany days later, but were unwilling to engage in active combat. The Soviet Union, led by Joseph Stalin, soon invaded eastern Poland, having signed a non-aggression pact with Germany. Poland was subsequently partitioned into Soviet and German occupied territories.

In 1940, Germany invaded Norway, Denmark, France, the Netherlands, Belgium, and Luxembourg, and Italy invaded Greece. Germany also began the Battle of Britain and the Blitz, two aerial bombardments of the U.K. The British prime minister was Winston Churchill. In 1941, Germany invaded Yugoslavia and Greece, and began invading the Soviet Union, which brought the Soviets into the Allied war effort. Later that year, Germany declared war on the U.S., who also joined the Allies. The U.S. president was Franklin D. Roosevelt. In 1942 and 1943, the Soviets halted the German invasion of their country at the Battle of Stalingrad, while the Allies bombed German industrial facilities. In 1943, the Allied powers began invading Italy, leading to the end of Mussolini's regime. Germans and Italians loyal to the Axis continued fighting the Allies.

In 1944, the Allies liberated Rome, then began invading German-occupied Western Europe, starting with Normandy in northern France. Meanwhile, the Soviets launched a massive counteroffensive in Eastern Europe. Both campaigns were successful. The concentration camps used in the Holocaust were liberated, and the Soviets surrounded the German capital Berlin. In April 1945, Mussolini was hanged, Roosevelt died of poor health and was succeeded by Harry S. Truman, and Hitler died by suicide in response to the encirclement of Berlin. Germany unconditionally surrendered on 8 May (Note: All German forces were to cease operations on 23:01 hours Central European time on 8 May 1945, which was already 9 May in Moscow and other parts of the USSR; therefore 9 May was considered to be the end of the war in the Soviet Union and still is in its successor states)—now celebrated as 'Victory in Europe Day'—although fighting continued in other parts of Europe until 25 May. On 5 June, Germany signed the Berlin Declaration, proclaiming its unconditional surrender to the Allies.

The Allies then turned their attention to finishing the Pacific War against the Axis power of Japan. After World War II ended, the Allies occupied much of Europe. They restored countries' pre-war governments, or established new ones, and funded much of Europe's economic recovery. German military leaders were prosecuted in the Nuremberg trials. Western Europe became a bloc of capitalist governments, while Eastern Europe became communist, marking the beginning of the Cold War among the former Allied nations.

== Background ==
=== Axis powers ===
Germany was defeated in World War I, and the 1919 Treaty of Versailles placed punitive conditions on the country after finding Germany and the other Central Powers guilty for starting the war. These punishments included the loss of Alsace-Lorraine, the temporary loss of the Saarland, military limitations, and reparation payments to the Allied powers. The Rhineland region of Germany was also made a demilitarised zone. Germany would also join the League of Nations, an international governmental body devoted to peacekeeping. Historians are divided on whether or not the treaty was harsh or actually "very restrained" compared to other peace treaties at the time. Many Germans back then blamed their country's post-war economic collapse on the treaty's conditions and these resentments contributed to the political instability, which made it possible for Adolf Hitler and his Nazi Party to come to power. This was worsened by the worldwide Great Depression, which began in 1929.

Hitler became the chancellor and fuhrer of Germany in 1933. In February 1933, the German Reichstag building caught on fire in an arson attack, giving Hitler the opportunity to blame the fire on his political opponents, especially communists. In response, the government passed the Decree of the Reich President for the Protection of the People and State, which "abolished freedom of speech, assembly, privacy and the press; legalized phone tapping and interception of correspondence; and suspended the autonomy of federated states, like Bavaria". Communist politicians were arrested, leaving the Nazi Party free to do what they wanted. Hitler made Germany an absolute dictatorship, and he withdrew from the League of Nations. In 1934, during the Night of the Long Knives, Hitler ordered the purge of leaders within the Nazi Party's Sturmabteilung (SA) paramilitary organisation, believing them to have gotten too powerful.

From 1919 to 1921, Italian fascist Benito Mussolini grew a base of supporters who wanted him to deal with Italy's political and economic crises, which involved civil conflict over the growth of socialism in the country. Many of Mussolini's supporters became known as blackshirts, who would form a paramilitary that terrorised the Italian countryside in a campaign against socialism. In 1922, during a controversial general strike by a weakened trade unionist movement, Mussolini and his followers seized power in Rome and installed him as the Prime Minister of Italy to run the country alongside the pre-existing monarchy of King Victor Emmanuel III. Similar to Germany, Mussolini turned the country into a one-party fascist state which outlawed free speech, the free press, trade unions, and targeted socialists, Catholics, and liberals with a network of secret police and spies. Italy became sympathetic to Nazi Germany in the 1930s.

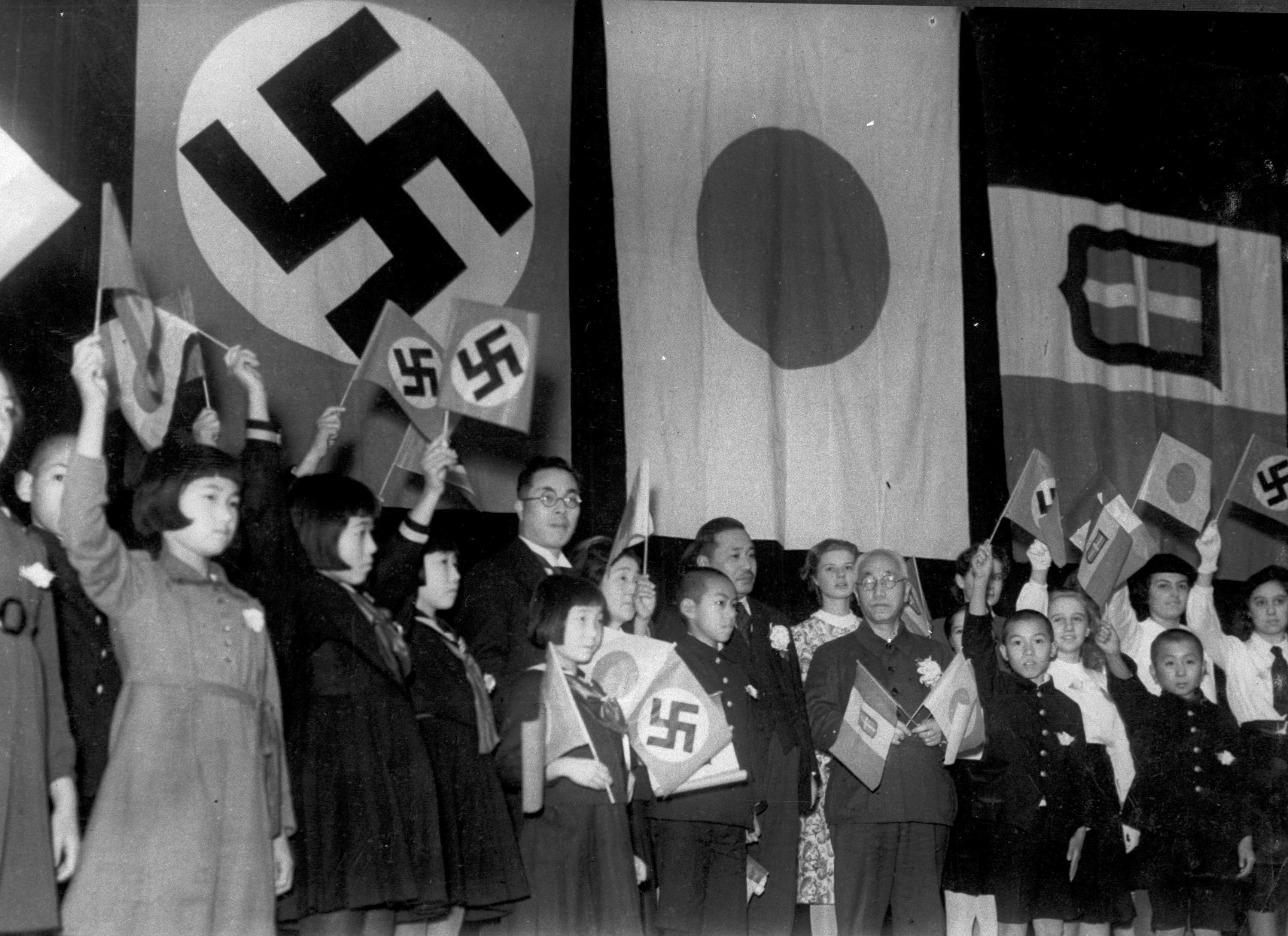
A celebration at the 1940 Tokyo signing of the Tripartite Act defence agreement between Nazi Germany, Imperial Japan, and Fascist Italy; their flags are present

Italy, Germany, and Imperial Japan — led by Emperor Hirohito and Prime Minister Hideki Tojo — increasingly allied with each other, and during World War II they would be known as the Axis powers. Italy and Japan needed allies, as Italy was involved in the Second Italo-Ethiopian War (the Italian invasion of the Ethiopian Empire) from 1935 to 1937, and Japan started the Second Sino-Japanese War (Japan's expanded invasion of the Republic of China) in 1937, the latter of which was subsumed by World War II and ended in 1945.

In 1936, Italy and Germany made a pact of mutual assurance, the Rome-Berlin Axis agreement. Also that year, Japan and Germany signed the Anti-Comintern Pact to counter the perceived threat of communism from the Soviet Union led by Joseph Stalin; Italy joined the pact in 1937. Italy and Germany signed the Pact of Steel in 1939, formalising the Rome-Berlin axis. Other smaller powers joined the Axis throughout World War II. The Axis' main opponents would be the Allies, a name reused from the Allies who were the main opponent of the Central Powers in World War I.

=== Nazi social policies ===
Under the Nazi Party, Germany developed a hierarchy which considered the pseudoscientific "Aryan race" — white ethnic Germans or those closest genetically to them – as the most superior race, and Jews and Slavs at or near the bottom. A major part of Nazi Germany's racial policy was the concept of lebensraum, or "living space": increasing the amount of land in Europe where members of the Aryan race could live. The United States Holocaust Memorial Museum writes:

The Nazis also adopted the social Darwinist take on Darwinian evolutionary theory regarding the "survival of the fittest." For the Nazis, survival of a race depended upon its ability to reproduce and multiply, its accumulation of land to support and feed that expanding population, and its vigilance in maintaining the purity of its gene pool, thus preserving the unique "racial" characteristics with which "nature" had equipped it for success in the struggle to survive. Since each "race" sought to expand, and since the space on the earth was finite, the struggle for survival resulted "naturally" in violent conquest and military confrontation. Hence, war—even constant war—was a part of nature, a part of the human condition.

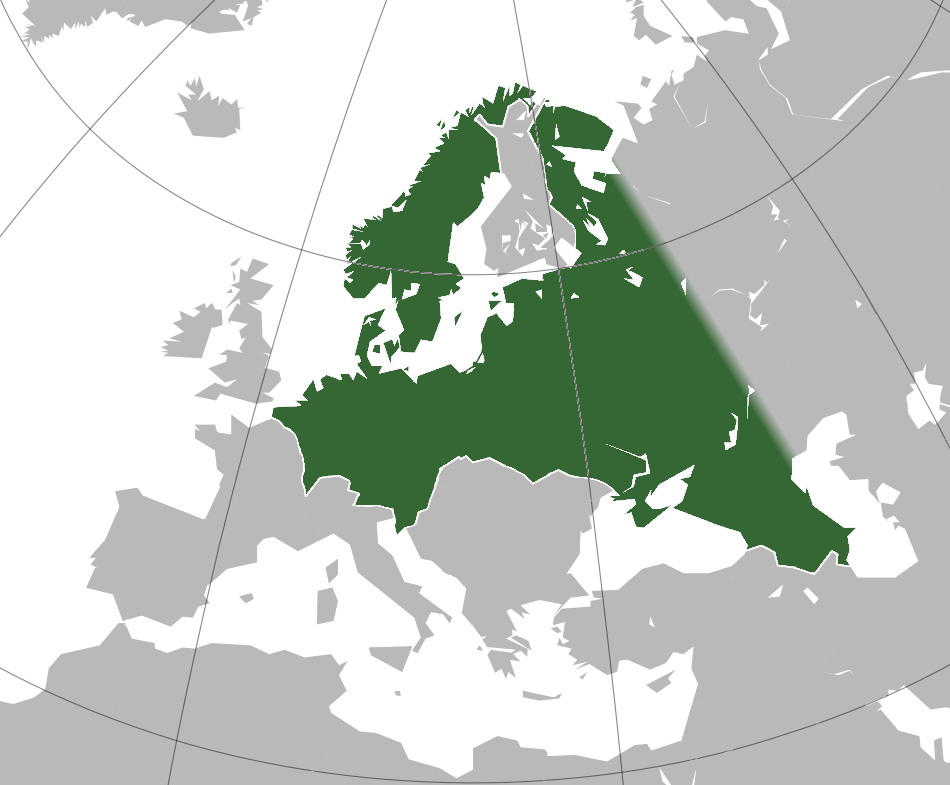
The boundaries of the "Greater Germanic Reich" that the Nazi Party planned to be occupied by the "Aryan race", who were alleged to require "living space" (lebensraum) in Europe beyond Germany's borders

This formed a key motivation of Germany's expansion in Europe in the mid-to-late 1930s. In 1934, Germany signed a non-aggression pact with Poland, but this would not last as Poland was considered a part of the lebensraum; Nazi mythology considered eastern Europe to be lost German land. In 1933, Germany began building concentration camps to hold their political enemies and those they considered "degenerates", such as people on the lower end of their racial hierarchy, the Nazi Party's political enemies (like socialists, social democrats, and communists), Poles, Romani people, Jehovah's Witnesses, Freemasons, disabled people, and LGBTQ people. They were brought from many places across lower continental Europe to the camps using the extensive railway network which crossed the continent. The mass killing of the camps' prisoners, which started as soon as they were built, expanded in 1941, which is usually when the start date of the Holocaust is given. (Note: There is debate as to whether "Holocaust victims" should just refer to the 6 million Jews who were killed, or those 6 million plus the millions of other people who were killed as a part of the same process.) In 1938, during the Kristallnacht pogroms, 30,000 Jews were sent to concentration camps.

In 1938, German chemists Otto Hahn and Fritz Strassman discovered nuclear fission, or the release of large amounts of energy when an atom's nucleus splits into smaller nuclei. German scientists of the Uranverein (uranium club) then began a project to develop the atomic bomb, a bomb using nuclear fission that could destroy entire cities. This was supposed to be secret, but scientists fleeing Nazi Germany to avoid persecution made word of the program in other Western countries. In 1939, United States President Franklin D. Roosevelt was warned of the program by one of these fleeing scientists, Albert Einstein.

==== German expansion and the partition of Czechoslovakia ====
The UK and France responded to Germany's aggressive expansion through appeasement, "maintain[ing] peace in Europe by making limited concessions to German demands", which was seen as reasonable by the British and French populaces because the Treaty of Versailles was thought of as indeed too restrictive, and they did not want to go to war with Germany. In 1935, Germany revoked the Treaty of Versailles' limitations on its military, and remilitizared the Rhineland in 1936. On 13 March 1938, Germany annexed Austria in the Anschluss.

Hitler then threatened to go to war with Czechoslovakia, and in response, on 30 September 1938, Hitler, Mussolini, UK prime minister Neville Chamberlain, and French premier Edouard Daladier signed the Munich Agreement, which gave Germany the Sudetenland, a Czech region near its border with Germany which had long been ethnically German. Chamberlain returned to England and proclaimed that the UK had achieved "Peace for our time". At the same time, Hungary annexed a part of southern Slovakia and Poland annexed the Tešin District of Czech Silesia. On 15 March 1939, Germany occupied the remaining western half of Czechoslovakia, the Czech provinces of Bohemia and Moravia. Later that month, part of Slovakia became the independent fascist and Catholic state of the Slovak Republic under dictator and Catholic priest Jozef Tiso. The republic was controlled by the Slovak People's Party, who made the country a client state of Germany and allowed Germany to occupy it. At the same time, the eastern part of Slovakia, the Subcarpathian Rus, was annexed by Hungary. The latter two annexations formally ended the country of Czechoslovakia, which had existed since 1918.

By early 1939, Hitler had plans of invading Poland, despite Poland having assurances from the UK and France that those countries would intervene if Poland was attacked. Germany revoked its non-aggression pact with Poland on 28 April. To ensure Germany would not face resistance from the Soviet Union during an invasion, the two countries signed an agreement to neutrality named the Molotov–Ribbentrop Pact after secret negotiations from 23 to 24 August. Hitler gave the orders to invade on 26 August, certain that the UK and the Soviet Union would not retaliate. However, on the 25th, the UK and Poland publicly signed a formal treaty of military assurance, causing Hitler to delay the war for a few days. On 31 August, he gave the order to invade the next day.

== Beginning of the war in Europe (1939–1940) ==
=== Invasion of Poland (1939) ===
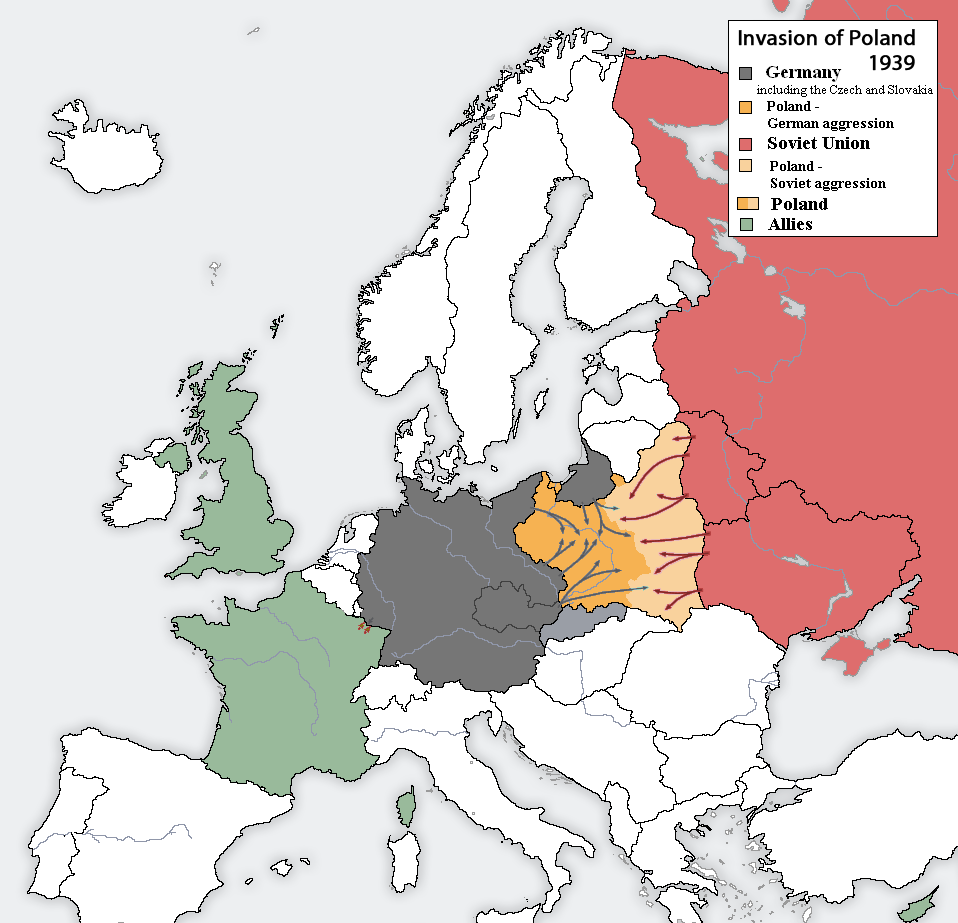
Europe at the beginning of World War II in September 1939, showing the September and October movements of Nazi Germany and the Soviet Union during the invasion of Poland

On 1 September 1939, Germany invaded Poland, falsely claiming that Poland was trying to encircle and partition Germany and that ethnic Germans were being persecuted there. Germany had staged an attack on one of their own radio stations the previous night and blamed it on the Poles. 1.5 million soldiers of the German military, the Wehrmacht, took part in the invasion, and had overwhelming military superiority to Poland's 1 million soldiers. The invasion was led by generals Fedor von Bock, Franz Halder, Georg von Küchler, Gerd von Rundstedt, Günther von Kluge, Johannes Blaskowitz, Walther von Brauchitsch, Walther von Reichenau, and Wilhelm List. Poland fought on a large front, both on the German border and with their flanks in the German territory of East Prussia in the north and German-occupied Slovakia in the south. Poland did not move their troops eastward to more defensive positions because their western half had their most vital industrial regions.

The Wehrmacht used "Blitzkrieg attacks", surprise attacks with "massive, concentrated forces of fast-moving [armoured] units supported by overwhelming air power". Their air force, the Luftwaffe, specifically operated as support for the Army. They quickly destroyed vital Polish infrastructure including the railways, essentially taking out the Polish Air Force before it could be used. In 1939, they surpassed the three current Allied powers in their individual numbers of infantry and armoured divisions (the Wehrmacht's armoured divisions are also known as panzer divisions). (Note: Poland had 30 infantry divisions, 12 cavalry brigades and one armoured brigrade (as well as 30 reserve infantry divisions which could not be mobilised in time); Germany had 100 infantry divisions and six armoured divisions; France had 90 infantry divisions; and the UK had ten infantry divisions.) Germany also had more machine guns, mortars, antitank guns, and howitzers per division than the Allies, while having about an equal number of tanks and military aircraft to the three of them combined.

New types of military technology invented in the interwar years included radar, the dive bomber, and the aircraft carrier. The Allied countries, motivated by their victory in World War I, had generally not worked to produce significant amounts of newer weapons and military equipment afterwards, feeling confident in what they already had, while Germany did the opposite since remilitarising in 1935. Poland did not have "tanks, armoured personnel carriers, and antitank and antiaircraft guns", and believed horsed cavalry could take on German mechanised forces. The UK and France did make up for Poland's lack of air strength; Poland only had fighters and bombers, and the other Allies had those plus aircraft meant for either reconnaissance, coastal defence, or naval aviation. The UK had ready the newer Hurricane fighter and was producing the Spitfire, which began combat in 1940. France's military aircraft, however, were outdated, and they were trying to buy newer models from the United States. The UK did not have any armoured divisions, and France's tanks were spread thin across its infantry divisions. The Allies in 1939 were "together superior in industrial resources, population, and military manpower", but German weapons, equipment, training and logistics made the Wehrmacht the most powerful army in the world. Britannica writes:

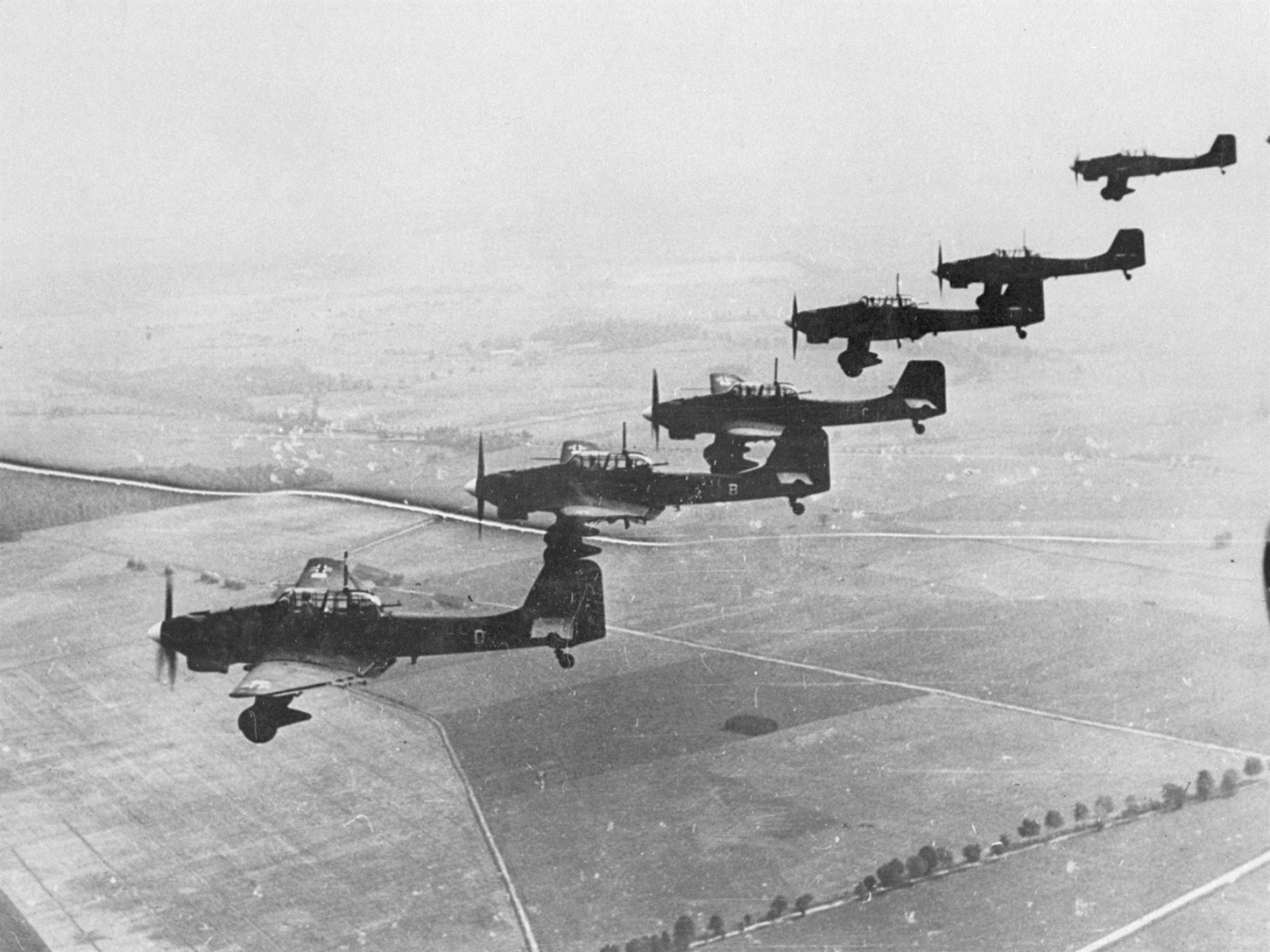
The Luftwaffe's Stuka bombers during the invasion of Poland

In accordance with the doctrines of General Heinz Guderian, the German tanks were used in massed formations in conjunction with motorized artillery to punch holes in the enemy line and to isolate segments of the enemy, which were then surrounded and captured by motorized German infantry divisions while the tanks ranged forward to repeat the process: deep drives into enemy territory by panzer divisions were thus followed by mechanized infantry and foot soldiers. These tactics were supported by dive bombers that attacked and disrupted the enemy's supply and communications lines and spread panic and confusion in its rear, thus further paralyzing its defensive capabilities.

The only form of combat in which Germany had inferior capability was at sea, so they did not attack the Allies' navies with massed fleets, but instead through "the individual operation of German pocket battleships and commerce raiders".

France and the UK declared war on Germany on 3 September, but they did not actually engage in warfare with Germany during the invasion of Poland. Meanwhile, the Battle of the Atlantic began over control of sea routes in the Atlantic Ocean. On 17 September, the Soviets invaded Poland, and the Poles now fought on two fronts. The next day, Polish government officials escaped into Romania, and for the next ten days, the Polish garrison in the capitol of Warsaw held on as Germans bombed the city massively, killing many civilians. On the 28th, Poland surrendered, and the next day, Germany and Soviet Union partitioned the county between them in accordance with a secret provision of the Molotov-Ribbentrop Pact. The provision originally stated the western third of Poland would be given to the Germans, and the eastern two-thirds to the Soviets, while Lithuania would be put in the German sphere of influence; now, the two countries agreed to let Lithuania fall under the Soviet sphere of influence if more of Poland was given to Germany.

The last Polish unit surrendered on 6 October. The invasion ended with 14,000 Germans dead or missing and 66,000 to 70,000 Poles dead. 700,000 Poles were taken prisoner and 80,000 escaped into neutral countries. From October 1939 to March 1940, the European theatre was in a phase known as the Phoney War, when no major land operations were made by the Allied powers.

=== Winter War and Soviet occupation of the Baltics (1939–1940) ===
As early as August 1935, the Soviets' Leningrad commissar Andrei Zhdanov had started making observations of their border with Finland. Based on these observations, the Soviets began building railway spur tracks leading west toward Finnish wilderness, in particular toward Kuusamo, Suomussalmi, Kuhmo, and Lieksa. The tracks were meant for a future invasion of Finland; they could have served no other purpose than to transport troops and material, since little trade passed through these regions.

Finland and the Baltic states – Lithuania, Latvia, and Estonia — were allocated to the Soviet sphere of influence in the Molotov-Ribbentrop Pact. On 10 October 1939, the Soviets demanded the Baltic states to allow Soviet garrisons to be stationed within them. The countries felt threatened, resentfully agreeing to sign pacts of mutual assurance allowing the soldiers in. The beginning of World War II escalated tensions between Finland and the Soviet Union. The Soviets thought the Axis would use Finland as a base to attack them, and the Finns thought the Soviets were trying to expand into Finnish territory. The Soviets then forwarded demands to Finland that were similar to the demands sent to the Baltic states; the Finns also had to destroy their defensive Mannerheim Line along the Karelian Isthmus near the border with the Soviet Union. Finland rejected these demands, instead mobilising their army and unsuccessfully attempting to gain Allied support.

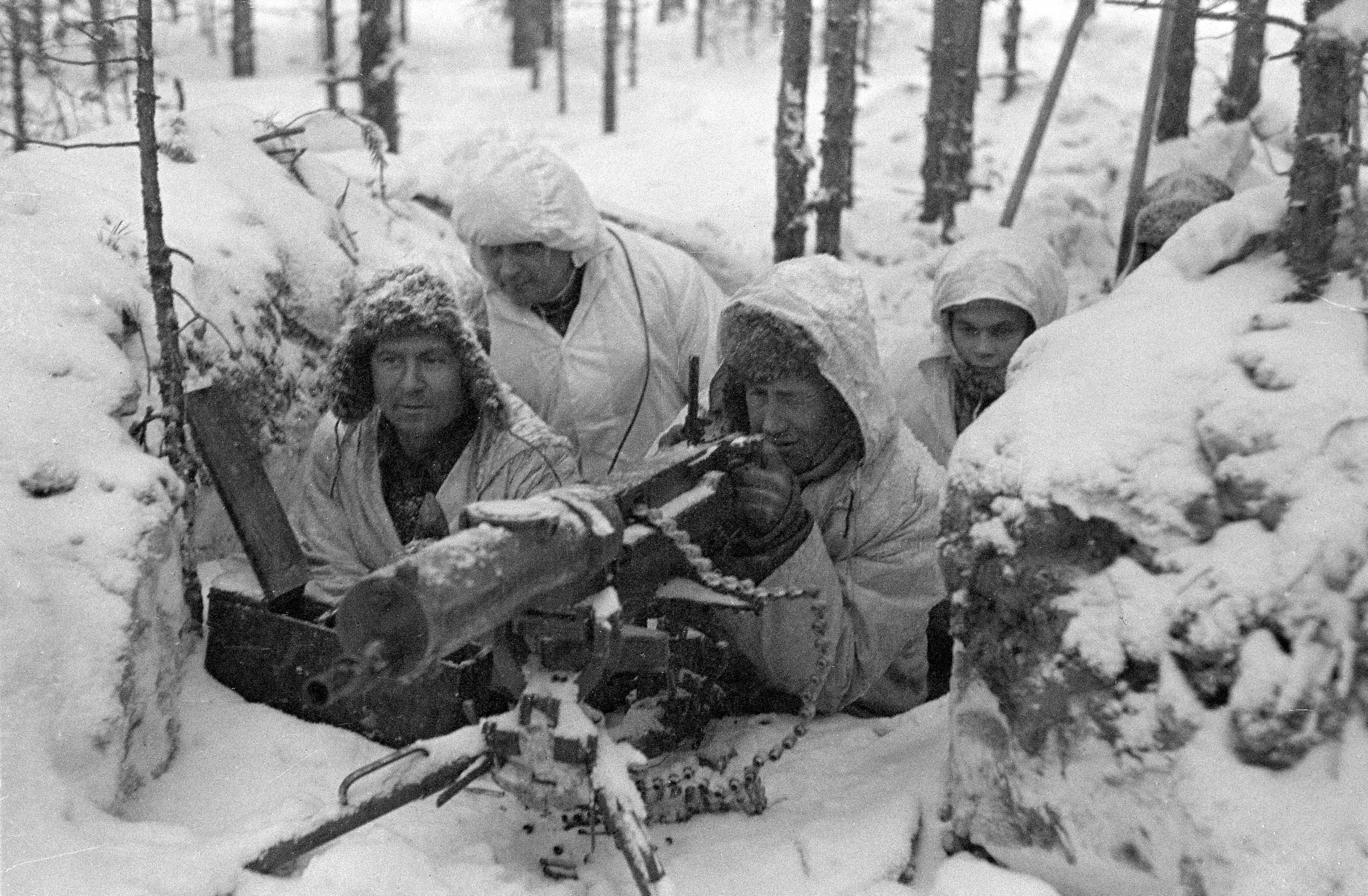
Finnish soldiers during the Winter War

On 30 November 1939, the Soviet Union invaded Finland, justifying it with a staged incident at the countries' border. Thus began the Winter War, with the Soviet objective being the conquest of Finland and the installation of a communist puppet government in Helsinki. At the start of the war, the Soviets suffered severe losses and made little progress. The Finns made use of the Molotov cocktail, a type of makeshift grenade, naming it after Soviet Foreign Minister Vyacheslav Molotov who was blamed for the war. The Finns, who had little outside help, became worn down in a war of attrition.

The Soviets reduced their strategic objectives in late January 1940 and put an end to the puppet Finnish communist government, and informed the legitimate Finnish government that they were willing to negotiate peace. After the Soviets reorganised and adopted different tactics, they renewed their offensive in February and breached the Mannerheim Line. On 6 March, Finland asked for peace terms, and on the 12th, the two countries signed the Moscow Peace Treaty, in which the Finns ceded 9% of their territory to the Soviet Union, and the Hanko Peninsula was leased to the Soviets for 30 years. The war ended the following day.

In June 1940, Joseph Stalin sent another set of ultimatums to the Baltic states, demanding the allowance of an unlimited number of Soviet troops into their countries and to form governments under Soviet terms. All three countries were occupied by within a few months and the Soviet Union quickly began the process of Sovietization, the enforcing of communist-led people's assemblies ("soviets") which would be the new governmental bodies. The new Baltic soviets voted for their countries to become republics of the Soviet Union; the Soviet Union formally accepted these additions in August 1940.

=== Scandinavian fronts (April–June 1940) ===
On 9 April 1940, in Operation Weserübung, Germany invaded Denmark and Norway as essentially a preventative measure to stop the UK and France from occupying Norway, as well as to protect German industry; Britain previously had set up naval blockades between Norway and Germany which cut off the import of iron from northern Sweden that was being shipped out of the Norwegian port of Narvik. The invasion was led by General of the Infantry Nikolaus von Falkenhorst. Germany notified the UK and France of the invasion in a memorandum claiming that the Allies were trying to use Scandinavia as a base from which to attack Germany from the north, and that Scandinavia needed to be protected from Allied "aggression". In the opening battle of the invasion, the Battle of Drøbak Sound, the Norwegians won and the German advance was slowed down.

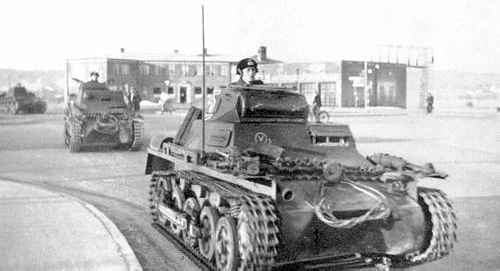
German Pz.Kpfw. I tanks in Aabenraa, Denmark on 9 April 1940

Norwegian resistance quickly faltered, however, and Norwegian government heads fled for the countryside. Vidkun Quisling, of the Nasjonal Samling fascist party, proclaimed a new government on the evening of 9 April 1940, and he became the Prime Minister of Norway under Germany's administration during the war. Norway's army agreed to cooperate with Germany, and began attacking the Allies. The UK tried to defend Norway with ground, air, and sea presence, but it was difficult. On 27 April, the British ground soldiers began to retreat. On 28 May, the British recaptured Narvik, but the Axis took it again on 9 June. The invasion was over by 10 June 1940. The British occupied the Faroe Islands in response to Germany's gains.

Sweden was able to remain neutral.

=== Positions of Spain and Portugal ===
In 1936, insurgents led by fascist Francisco Franco went to war with the democratically elected Spanish government in the Spanish Civil War. Hitler sided with Franco, giving aid to the insurgents. In 1939, Franco won the war, becoming the dictator of Spain. Before that, though, in early 1939, many Spaniards crossed the border into France, where they were given a choice by the French government whether to return to Spain (and be punished by Franco), or join the French military; during World War II, many Spanish soldiers fought for the Third French Republic (the French government before Germany invaded) and later for the French resistance against the Nazis. Spain claimed neutrality during World War II, but collaborated with the Axis. They gave Germany raw materials to use in weapons production. 10,000 to 15,000 Spaniards that were previously refugees in France were deported to Germany, where about 60% were killed by the Nazis. Portugal claimed neutrality as well, but they allowed the British to access Portuguese bases in the Azores.

== Axis expansion (1940–1941) ==
=== German invasion of Western Europe (1940) ===
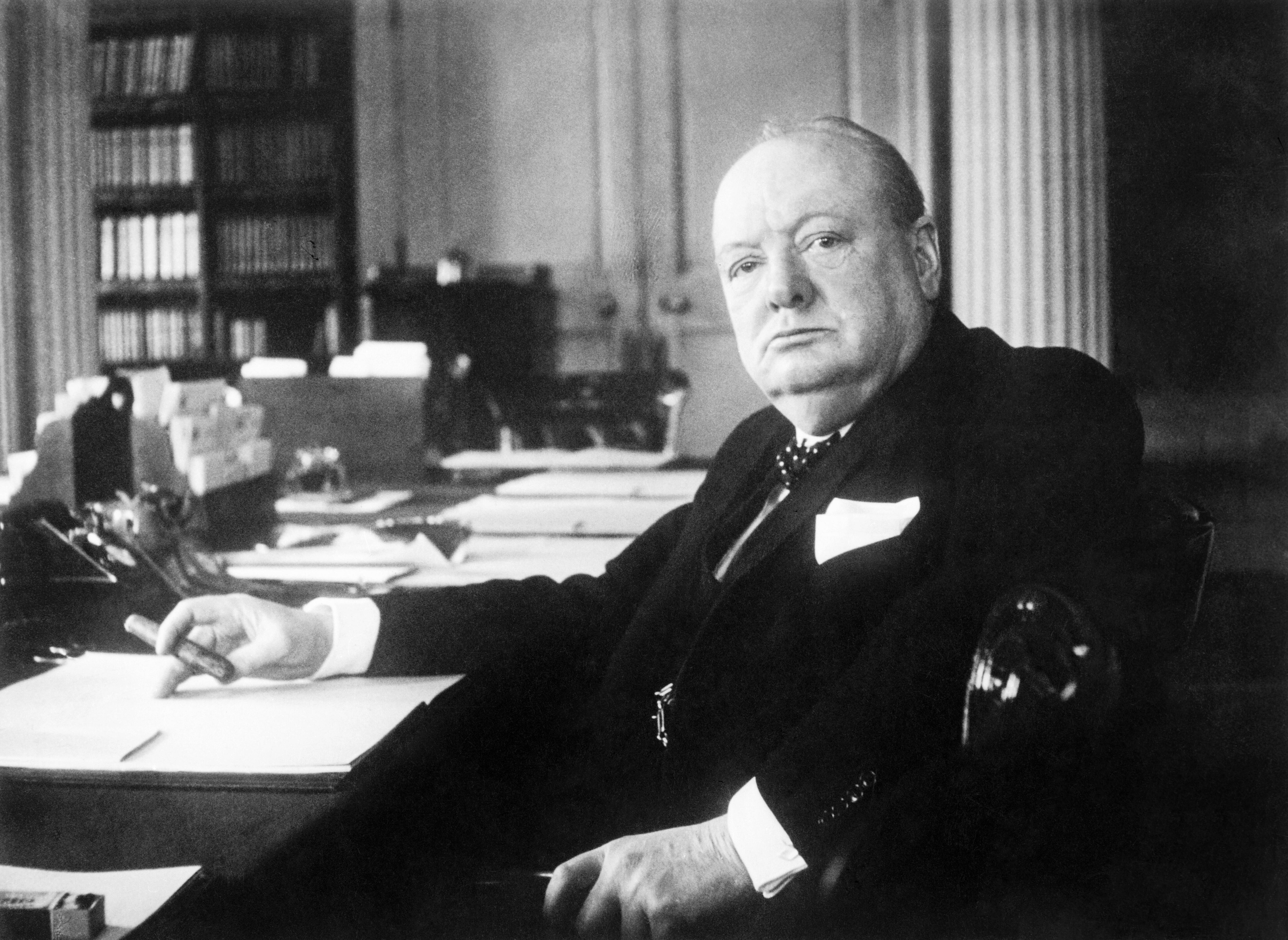
Winston Churchill at his desk while leading as UK prime minister, taken c. 1940–1945

On 10 May 1940, Germany began an invasion of France and the Low Countries (the Netherlands, Belgium, and Luxembourg). Three German commanders, Willhelm von Leeb, Fedor von Bock, and Gerd von Rundstedt took control of an army each and invaded France through the northern end of its German border, and also by crossing into France through the Low Countries, the latter movement resembling the Schlieffen Plan from World War I.

On the 10th, the Germans first entered the Netherlands and Belgium, and Neville Chamberlain resigned, making Winston Churchill the prime minister of the United Kingdom. Chamberlain had been criticised for the failure of the Norwegian campaign, and Churchill had become the Labour Party's choice for leading the nation – even if they disliked his anti-socialist beliefs – because of his willingness to fight Germany. A coalition government was formed, led by a war cabinet of Churchill, Chamberlain, the conservative Lord Halifax, and the Labour members Clement Attlee and Arthur Greenwood. Churchill also became the Minister of Defence. On 12 May, the Dutch Queen Wilhelmina fled with her ministers to England, where she established the Dutch government-in-exile. The next day, the Germans crossed the Meuse river, entering France.

=== British invasion of Iceland (1940) ===
Winston Churchill, meanwhile, tried to convince Iceland to join the Allies, but they wanted to stay neutral. Ultimately, the UK decided to invade, as the country was strategically important as a base to control the North Atlantic. The invasion began on 10 May 1940. The government disliked the violation of their sovereignty, but capitulated to the UK, who occupied the country. The UK promised to compensate the Icelandic population and leave at the end of the war. Canadian troops arrived in Iceland in June 1940 and the Americans arrived a year later; foreign troops continued staying in Iceland after the war, as the country became a NATO member.

=== Fall of France (1940) ===
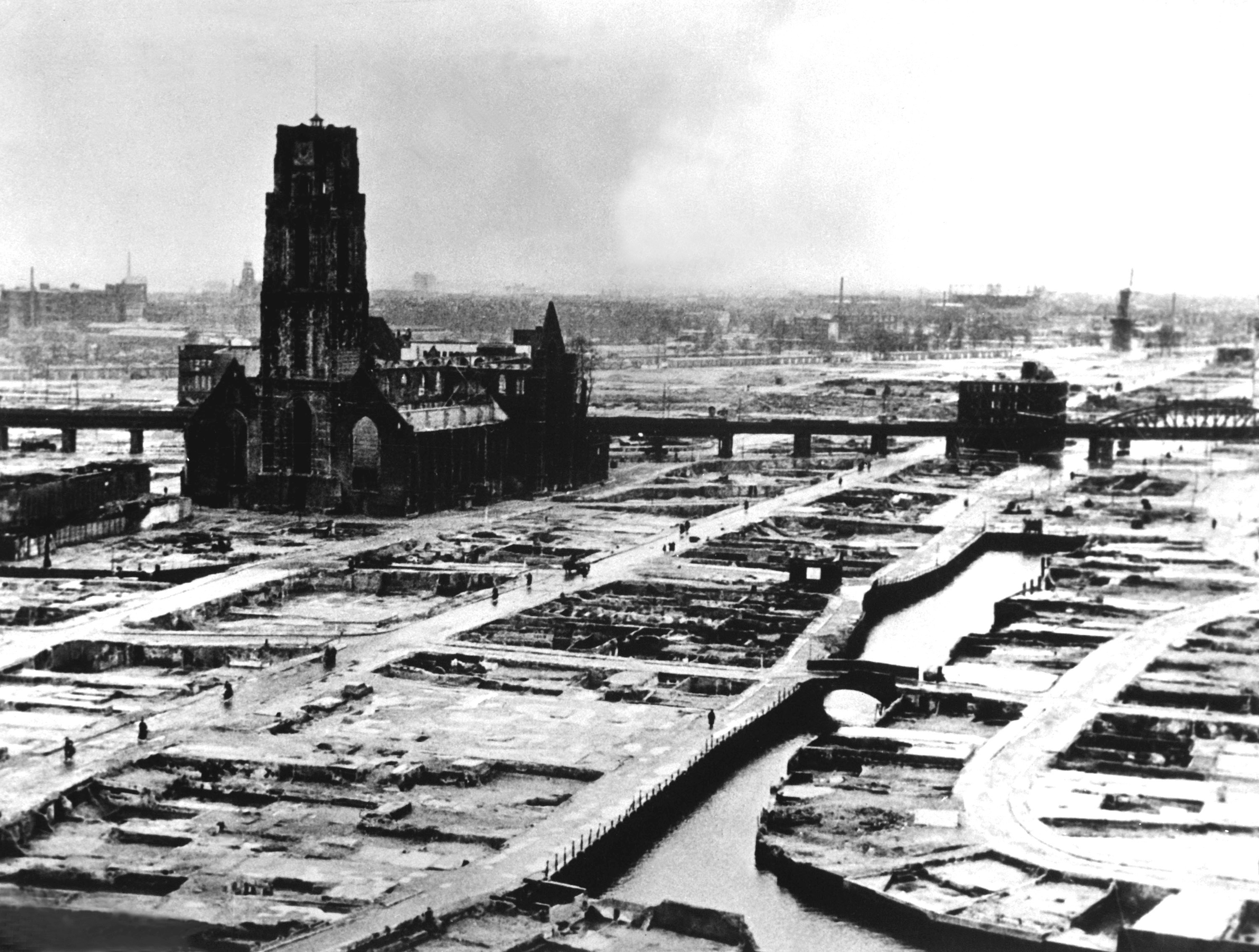
The center of the Dutch city of Rotterdam after its bombing during the German invasion of the Netherlands in 1940

On 14 May 1940, Dutch Commander-in-Chief Henri Winkelman surrendered his forces east of the Scheldt river, essentially all of the Netherlands. On the 15th, French general Maurice Gamelin reported to French premier Paul Reynard that the Germans might take Paris within days. Reynard then replaced Gamelin with retired general Maxime Weygand, who was in Syria. Weygand arrived from Syria on the 19th, leaving the French high command without a top general for days while the Germans pushed towards Paris. Weygand arrived and replaced 12 generals, notably employing general Charles de Gaulle. The Germans broke through the French line on the 15th and marched swiftly into undefended land. They reached the English Channel by the 20th, and days later, moved north towards Calais and Dunkirk. The Belgians became encircled in Flanders. On the 24th, the Germans almost reached Dunkirk, but Hitler ordered them back, giving the British Expeditionary Forces and other Allies in Dunkirk some time to evacuate to England. They moved quickly, and the situation worsened on the 27th, when Leopold III, the king of Belgium, surrendered his army. The Allies successfully evacuated by 4 June, saving 198,000 British men and 140,000 French men. At this point, the French front had been pushed back to the Somme and Aisne rivers. French numbers and morale weakened, and many retreated westward across France. On 9 June, the Germans crossed the Seine.

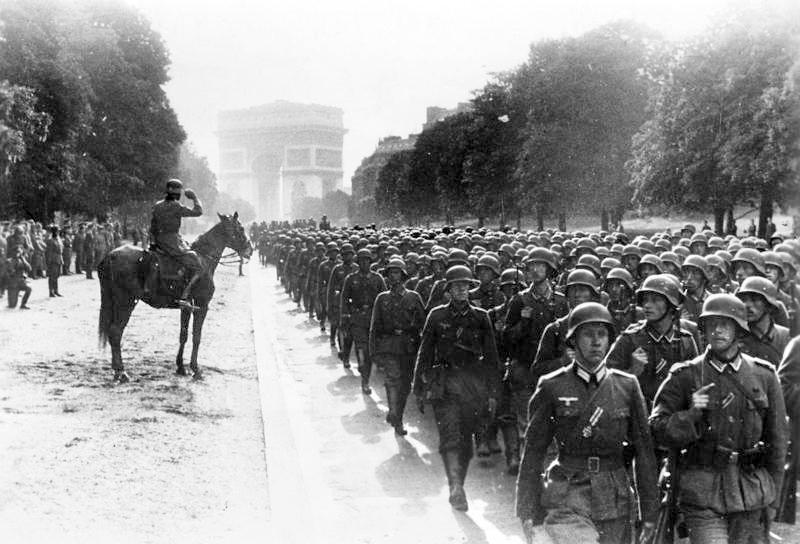
German troops in Paris after the Fall of France, 14 June 1940

On 10 June 1940, Italy declared war on France and the United Kingdom. They began attacking France on the 20th, but it made little effect. Reynaud had fled Paris to Tours, and he and his ministers were told by Weygand on the 12th that the French battle had been lost. Meanwhile, French Major General Victor Fortune surrendered his 10,000 men of the British Expeditionary Forces' 51st Highland Division who were being exhausted at Saint-Valéry-en-Caux. On the 14th, the French military evacuated Paris and the Germans entered the city. Reynaud again moved the government, this time to Bordeaux. The next day, Verdun fell, and on the 16th, Reynaud resigned, being succeeded by Philippe Petain. On the 17th, Petain asked the Germans for an armistice. On 18 June 1940, de Gaulle asked the French people, in a speech from London, to resistance against the Germans. The terms were dictated with Hitler on the 21st, and on the 25th, war between France and Germany/Italy was officially over. On 22 June, France was divided into two sections under the Franco-German Armistice; one was occupied by the German military and the other, Vichy France, had some autonomy.

The Chasselay massacre occurred in France in June 1940.

=== Battle of Britain and the Blitz (1940) ===
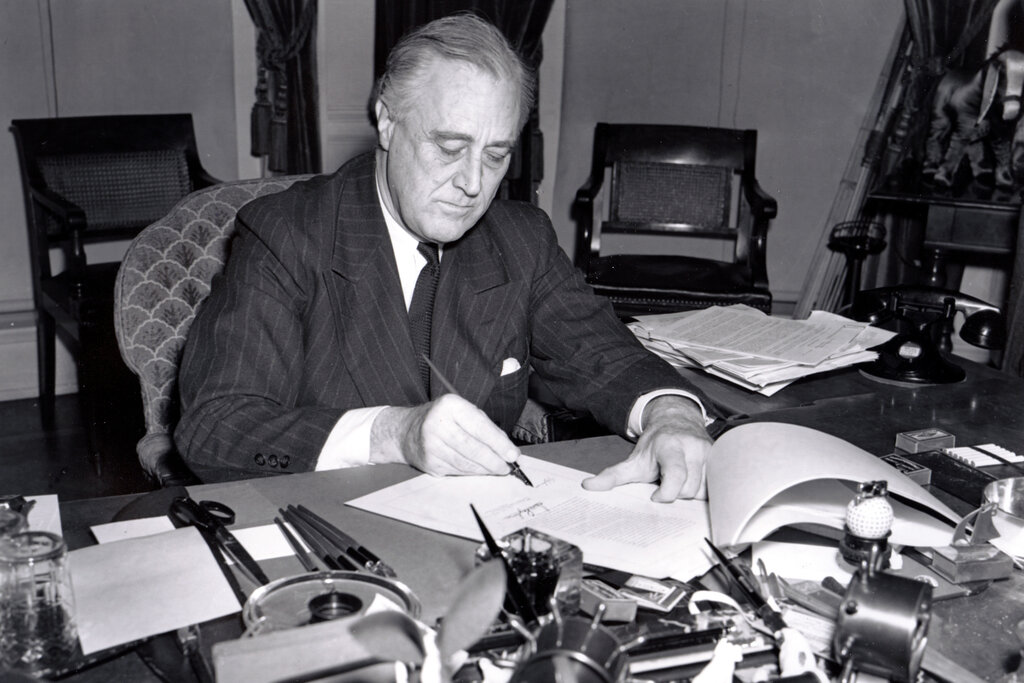
U.S. president Franklin D. Roosevelt signs the Lend-Lease Act in 1941

Starting in June 1940, in the Battle of Britain, the German Luftwaffe air branch launched air assaults on the United Kingdom in preparation to launch an amphibious invasion of Britain codenamed Operation Sea Lion. The British Royal Air Force (RAF) successfully defended Britain, and that phase of bombing ended in September 1940. On 7 September, the Luftwaffe started an aerial bombing campaign on Britain known as the Blitz, which instead destroyed strategic targets to hurt the British war effort.

During the Battle of Britain, the UK asked the U.S. for help, but the American public was divided over the need to get involved in the war. In the November 1940 U.S. presidential election, the incumbent President Franklin D. Roosevelt was elected to his third term in office. America was becoming more certain of the need to send aid to the UK; for example, Roosevelt's main opponent in the election, Wendell Willkie of the Republican Party, differed from his party's previous sentiment by agreeing to give aid. In December 1940, president-elect Roosevelt gave a speech in which he explained his "Arsenal of democracy" approach to the war and justifying providing the UK with aid. In March 1941, the U.S. Congress passed the Lend-Lease Act, which allowed the U.S. to send large amounts of aid: it ranged from "tanks, aircraft, ships, weapons and road building supplies to clothing, chemicals and food." The program soon expanding to giving aid to the Soviet Union, China, and allied France.

The Greek counteroffensive from 13 November 1940 to 7 April 1941

=== Italian invasion of Greece (1940–1941) ===
On 28 October 1940, Italy began invading Greece. This surprised the Greeks, as well as Hitler, who did not want Axis troops to be taken away from the North African campaign. Mussolini was convinced that Italy would quickly win, but they were pushed back into Albania after a week. The Italians then spent the next three months in Albania defending against the Greeks. At the Battle of Taranto, the British navy destroyed almost half of the Italian fleet. In March 1941, the British sent 58,000 Commonwealth troops to help Greece, despite their intense combat in North Africa.

=== The Holocaust begins (1940–1941) ===
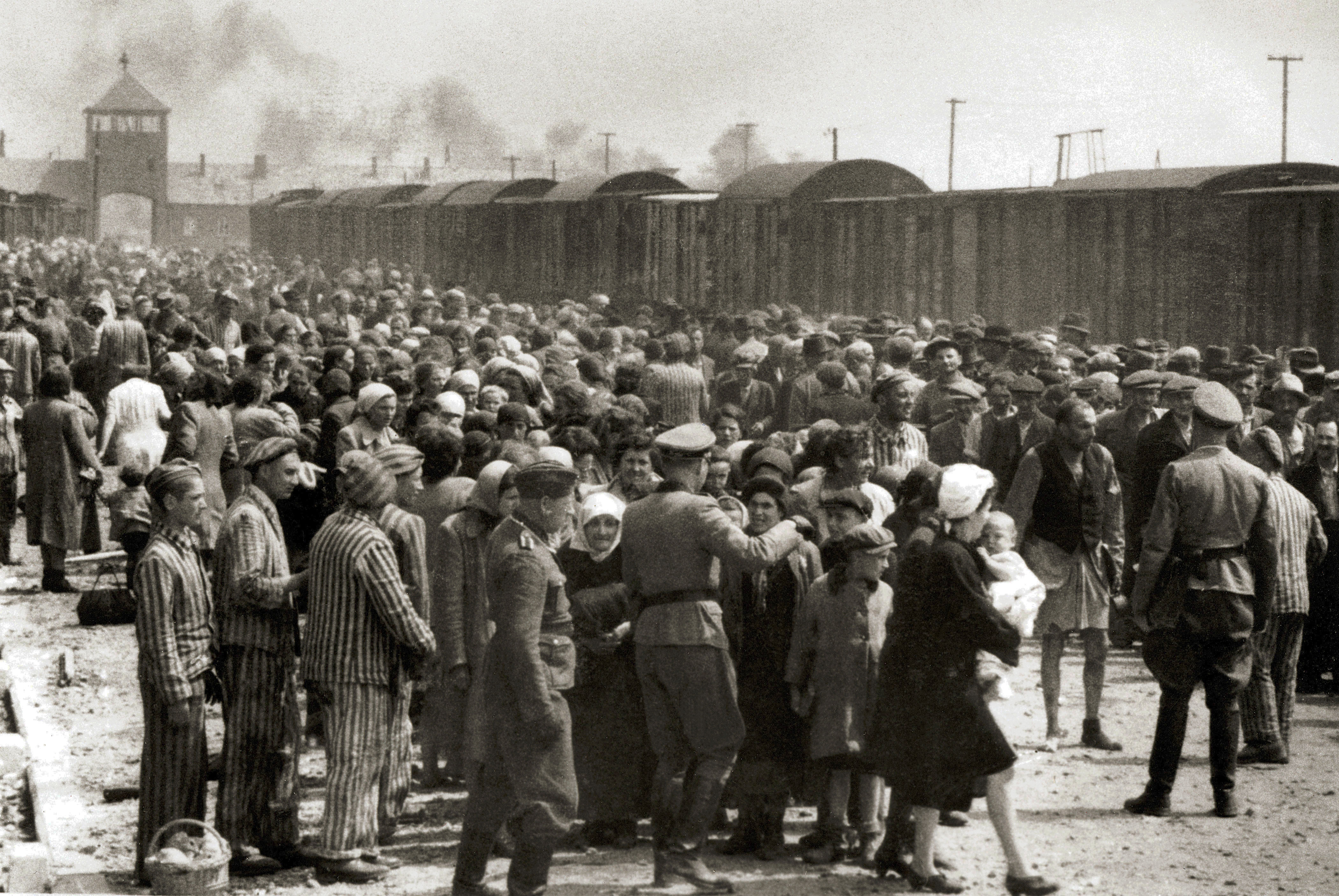
Hungarian Jews being selected to either work or die in the gas chambers at the Auschwitz-Birkenau concentration camp, 19 May 1944

From 20 to 24 November 1940, Hungary, Romania, and Slovakia joined the Axis powers under the Tripartite Pact. In 1941, Hitler and other Nazi Party leaders including Heinrich Himmler and Reinhard Heydrich agree on a program of mass extermination of Jews throughout occupied Europe, beginning the Holocaust; this was referred to as the "Final Solution" to the "Jewish question", or the debate over what should happen to the Jews living on the continent. On 1 March 1941, Himmler ordered the construction of the Auschwitz-Birkenau concentration camp. At the same time, Bulgaria joined the Tripartite Pact, and two days later, Germany began sealing off a Jewish ghetto in Krakow, Poland. Aside from concentration camps, the Final Solution was also enacted with Einsatzgruppen, mobile killing units. Croatia joined the Tripartite Pact on 15 June.

=== German invasion of Yugoslavia and Greece (1941) ===
On 6 April 1941, Germany, aided by Bulgarian and Hungarian forces, started invading Yugoslavia and Greece. This was to help the Italian invasion of Greece, overthrow the pro-Allied Yugoslavia government, secure the German flank during the planned invasion of Russia, protect German oil in Romania from Allied air attacks, and create a base to attack British communication lines with the east. Major Yugoslavian cities, including Belgrade, were bombed. On 17 April, Yugoslavia capitulated, as Germany moved into northern Greece. Greek cities were subject to Blitzkrieg attacks; despite intense resistance, Athens fell on 27 April. 2,500 Germans were killed. 11,000 Allied men were captured, and 45,000 evacuated to the island of Crete.

On 20 May 1941, Germany began an invasion of Crete. They launched paratrooper assaults on multiple Cretan cities, overwhelming the Allies, who evacuated the island. Germany fought off guerrilla resistance in Yugoslavia and Greece for the rest of the war. In late 1941, the Brits started aiding the Chetnik guerrillas, led by Dragoljub Mihailovic. Eventually, the Chetniks fought in a civil war against another group of guerrillas, the Partisans, led by Josip "Tito" Broz. The Chetniks collaborated with the Allies, and in 1943, the British switched their alliance to the Partisans. In Greece, the communist ELAS fought a civil war with the republican EDES. They fought until a peace deal was made by the Allies.

== Greatest extent of Axis power (1941–1943) ==
=== Eastern Front (June–July 1941) ===
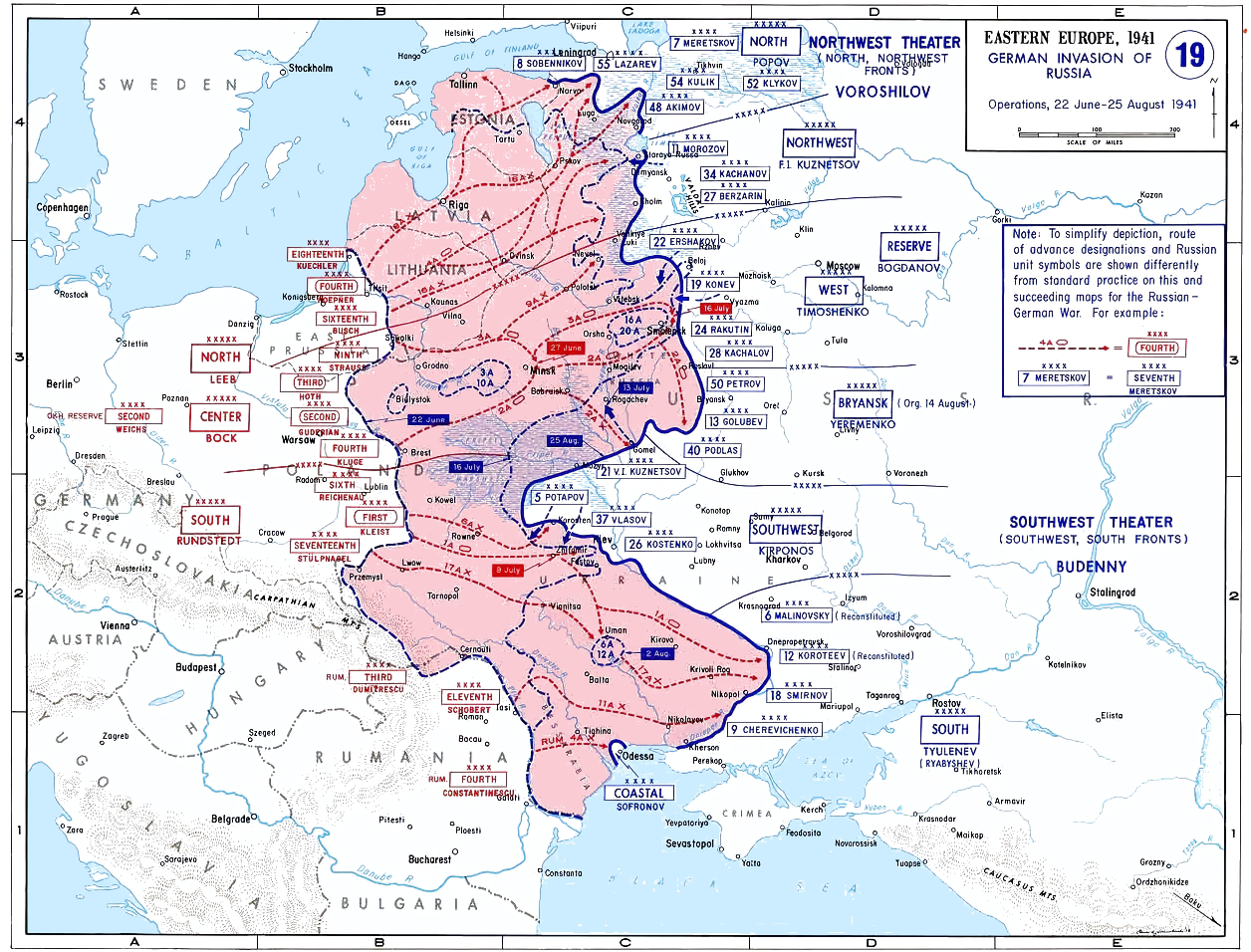
German advances in Operation Barbarossa, from 22 June to 25 August 1941

On 22 June 1941, Germany launched the invasion of the Soviet Union, code-named Operation Barbarossa. It had originally been planned for May, but Hitler used his troops to invade Yugoslavia and Greece, which was a more pressing matter. The campaigns in southern Europe were quick, but June would end up being a less ideal date for Barbarossa, as it was closer to the brutal Russian winter. Hitler and the Nazi High Command were convinced that by October, Germany would have taken the entirety of European Russia and the Soviet regime would collapse after losing support domestically. 3 million German soldiers were involved in Barbarossa, the largest invasion force in history. The northern end of the invasion was led by Wilhelm von Leeb; the center by Fedor von Bock, Heinz Guderian, and Hermann Hoth; and the south by Gerd von Rundstedt and Paul Ludwig von Kleist.

The Soviets were taken by surprise, and had trouble creating an opposing force in time. By 27 June 1941, the Germans had reached Minsk. The local Soviets were encircled; 300,000 became prisoners, while others escaped to the east. Guderian crossed the Dnieper river on 10 July, and on the 16th, his troops entered Smolensk, taking 200,000 prisoners. Meanwhile, the Soviets used a scorched earth policy, burning many parts of western Russia. The western manufacturing industries were moved eastward. At the same time, series of storms had turned the roads to Russia into mud, and the German tanks moved slowly. However, by mid-July, the Germans had moved 640 kilometres east from their starting positions, and were 320 kilometres to Moscow. At the end of July, the Germans broke through the Soviet front in Kiev. 520,000 Soviets were encircled and captured.

=== Eastern Front (September–December 1941) ===
Operation Reinhard, named after Reinhard Heydrich, began in the autumn of 1941. It was the plan to kill the two million Jews living in occupied Poland. For this purpose, Germany constructed three extermination camps, Bełżec, Sobibór, and Treblinka, and the Reich Security Main Office led by Heydrich deported Polish Jews to these locations. By the end of the war, around 1.5 million Jews were killed in the three camps. German police and the Schutzstaffel (SS) also led a number of killing missions. Operation Reinhard was directed by SS general Odilo Globocnik from autumn 1941 until summer 1943. It had overlap with Aktion T4, or Germany's program of euthanising disabled people with carbon monoxide gas.

As the Soviet Union was in a weakened position, in 1941, Finland used the opportunity to start the Continuation War, an attempt to take back the lands that they had lost during the Winter War. It would be fought until 1944. On 8 September 1941, Germany and Finland began the Siege of Leningrad, which also continued until 1944. In October 1941, at Vyazma, 600,000 of them were encircled and captured.

On 19 September 1941, the Germans entered the city of Kiev in Ukraine. Some of them were killed in explosions from mines left by retreating Soviet soldiers, and the Germans used this as a pretext to take revenge on the local Jews, whom the explosions were blamed on. From the 29th to the 30th, in the Babi Yar massacre, approximately 33,771 of Kiev's Jews were massacred. They had been summoned to a ravine near the city, where they were made to undress and enter the ravine before being shot.

In October 1941, the Siege of Sevastopol started when Germany and Romania tried to take Sevastopol from the Soviets. Soviet resistance prolonged the siege, but the Axis took the city in July 1942. In the First Battle of Kharkov from 20 to 24 October, the German Sixth Army successfully took the city of Kharkov where the Soviets had been producing their T-34 tanks. After the city's capture, the Germans discovered the tanks' production had been moved out of the city prior to the battle.

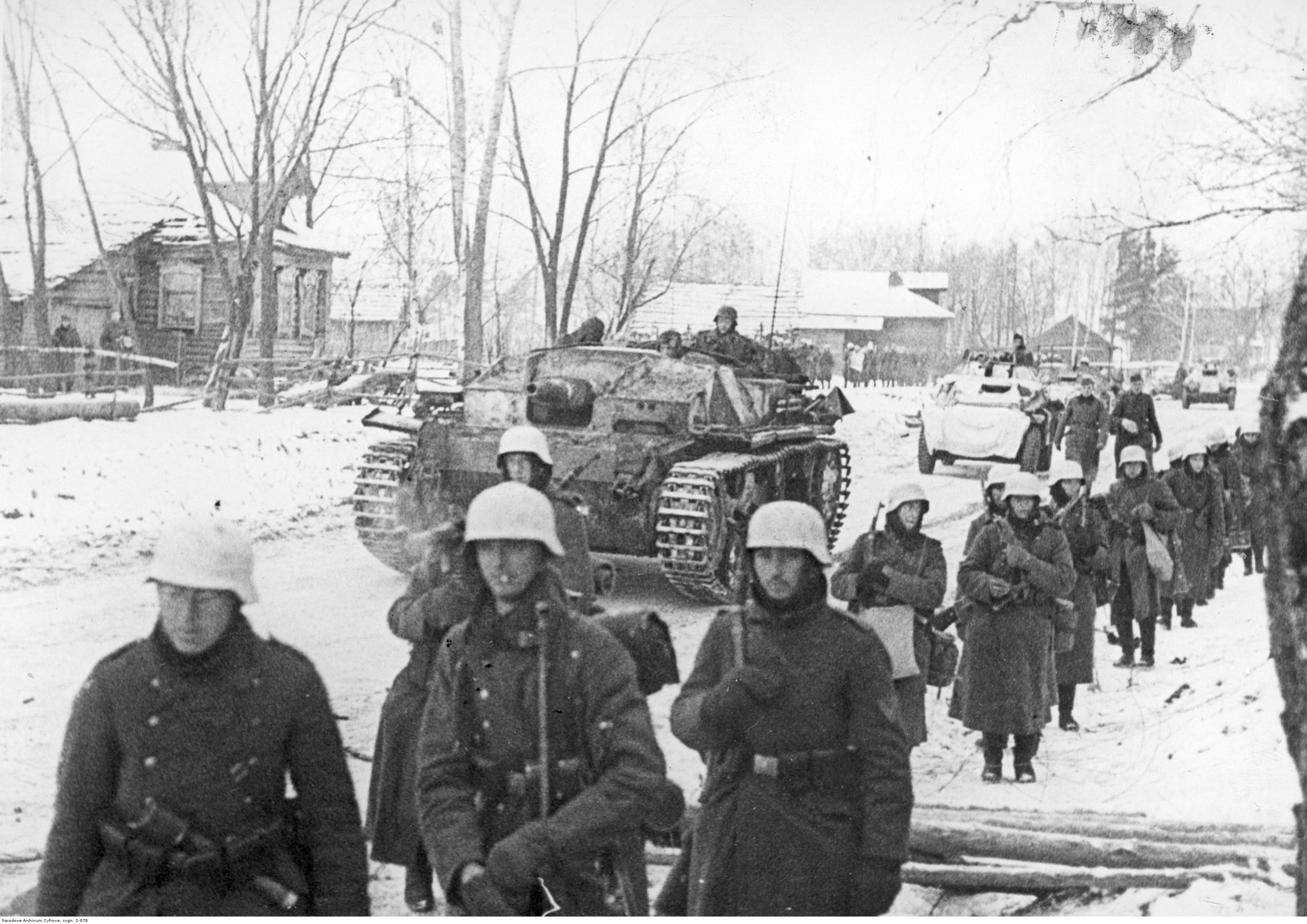
German mechanised forces move through a hamlet towards Moscow in the Battle of Moscow, December 1941.

As winter approached, the Germans in the Soviet Union were beaten down by cold weather; many got frostbite and had their military equipment freeze. Meanwhile, new waves of Soviets came to defend the front. On 22 November 1941, the Germans reached Rostov-na-Donu, an important location to continue the Caucasus campaign, but the Soviets launched a counteroffensive and took back the city on the 28th. On 2 December, some Germans had reached the suburbs of Moscow, but this is the closest they got to the center of the city. On 6 December, Soviet commander Georgy Zhukov started a large counteroffensive at Moscow which confirmed Barbarossa's failure.

=== America joins the war (1941) ===
Imperial Japan declared war on the United States by attacking the American military base at Pearl Harbor in Hawaii on 7 December. The next day, the Japanese ambassador Hiroshi Oshima went to German Foreign Minister Joachim von Ribbentrop, asking him to finally have Germany declare war on the United States. von Ribbentrop believed that the Americans entering the war would overwhelm the German war effort, but Hitler did not think so. On 11 December, Germany declared war on the United States, and the next day, Hitler defended the decision in a speech to the Reichstag. He claimed that Roosevelt's New Deal policies were the actual cause of World War II.

=== Operation Archery (1941) ===
On 27 December 1941, the British Army, Royal Navy, and the RAF launched Operation Archery, an attack on the Axis in the town of Måløy on Vaagso Island, Norway. The objective was to "sink, burn and destroy any enemy shipping found in the convoy assembly anchorage, and to put out of action the garrison (kill or capture) and the German installations in the port including the fish factories." Two British Commando units attacked, one to attack the German garrison in the town and the other to stop the German guns at the nearby Maaloy Island. The Army was supported by the British cruiser HMS Kenya and RAF aircraft taking off from Scotland and the Shetlands. The British sunk eight German ships and 120 Germans were killed before the British quickly retreated. The tactics of the operation would be used the Allies during the later Normandy landings.

=== Western Front (February–May 1942) ===
The route taken by the German ships in the Channel Dash

On 12 February 1942, in Operation Cerberus or the Channel Dash, three of the Kriegsmarine's biggest ships (Gneisenau, Prinz Eugen, and Scharnhorst) attempted to move from Brest, France — a vital German naval port — to the German coast in the North Sea through the English Channel's slim Dover Strait, despite the presence of the Royal Navy and RAF Coastal Command there. Once at Germany, they were supposed to be used for defending Norway. As part of the pre-existing Operation Fuller, launched in 1941 to defend the channel, the British responded with naval and air power; the Luftwaffe defended the Germans. The British destroyed some German aircraft, but the Royal Navy and RAF faced heavy losses and were unable to prevent the ships from reaching their destination. The ships' later use was limited, however. (Note: Scharnhorst had to undergo repairs until 1943, and was sunk by the British in December 1943 during the Battle of the North Cape; Gneisenau was badly damaged, never again being used as a warship, and was intentionally sank near Goteshafen by the Germans to prevent advancing Soviet ships in 1945; and Prinz Eugen defended Norway, lasting until the end of war – she was then used in the U.S.' post-war Bikini Atoll nuclear tests before sinking from a leak in 1946.)

On 28 March 1942, in Operation Chariot or the St Nazaire Raid, the Royal Navy attacked the German dry dock at St Nazaire in occupied France. The dock served as one of the bases of operation for German U-boats, and was defended by 6,000 soldiers. If it was destroyed, then the powerful German battleship Tirpitz — which had been defending Norway – could not be repaired at St Nazaire during potential future involvement in the Battle of the Atlantic, instead having to take trips to two other docks, during which the British could attack her easier. Operation Chariot used 611 British soldiers, first destroying the gate to the dock with the destroyer HMS Campbeltown, then attacking the ships. The British faced heavy losses, with 169 of them killed and 200 taken prisoner, but they greatly hurt the German navy, forcing Germany to divert troops from elsewhere to defend their Atlantic operations.

On the night of 30–31 May 1942, the RAF Bomber Command performed Operation Millennium. 1,047 bombers - the command's first raid involving more than 1,000 bombers – led by the Commander-in-Chief of the Bomber Command, Arthur Harris, launched a raid on Cologne, Germany. This used 2 1/2 times more pilots than any previous night raid, and was important for publicity and psychological warfare. Harris gathered large amounts of spare aircraft, and had some of them used by those who were still in pilot training. The raid was a success, starting more than 2,500 fires, destroying around 13,000 buildings, and killing less than 500 people. 41 RAF aircraft were lost. The operation's tactics were implemented by the Bomber Command for future use during the war. 135,000 to 150,000 of the city's previous population of around 700,000 fled.

=== German and American atomic bomb programs (1942–1945) ===
In summer 1942, the U.S. began the Manhattan Project, or their top-secret atomic bomb program in response to Germany's own program. The Manhattan Project was led by physicist J. Robert Oppenheimer, and was worked on mainly in Hanford, Washington; Los Alamos, New Mexico; and Oak Ridge, Tennessee. The U.S. overestimated Germany's program, which was cancelled as a military project in July 1942 and continued as a civilian project; it became disorganised as its Jewish scientists continued to escape Nazism, and was underfunded as Hitler did not understand its purpose.

In 1944, as Berlin was increasingly bombed, Germany's program moved from Berlin to Haigerloch. There, scientists unsuccessfully attempted to build a nuclear reactor instead of a nuclear bomb; as Germany weakened, the program shut down.

=== Eastern Front (April 1942 – March 1943) ===
In 1942, Reinard Heydrich was assassinated by Czech agents while in Prague. On 27 May, he was travelling through the city in an open vehicle; he did not give himself appropriate security, as he was convinced of the efficacy of his anti-resistance campaign within German-occupied Europe. His car went through a usual route taken to get to the nearby airport, where he would fly back to Hitler's headquarters. Along the way, Free Czech parachute agents (who had been trained in Britain) rolled a hand grenade under the vehicle. Heydrich was not immediately killed, but his leg and back were hit with grenade splinters, causing an infection which killed him on 4 June 1942. On 9 June, the day of his funeral in Berlin, Hitler announced attacks targeting Czechs in retaliation, and the towns of Lidice and Ležáky were destroyed.

In the Second Battle of Kharkov from 12 to 28 May 1942, Soviet marshal Semyon Timoshenko attempted to recapture Kharkov from the Germans. 170,000 Soviets were killed and 106,000 wounded as they faced major resistance from Fedor von Bock, but the Soviets retook the city after it had been mostly destroyed.

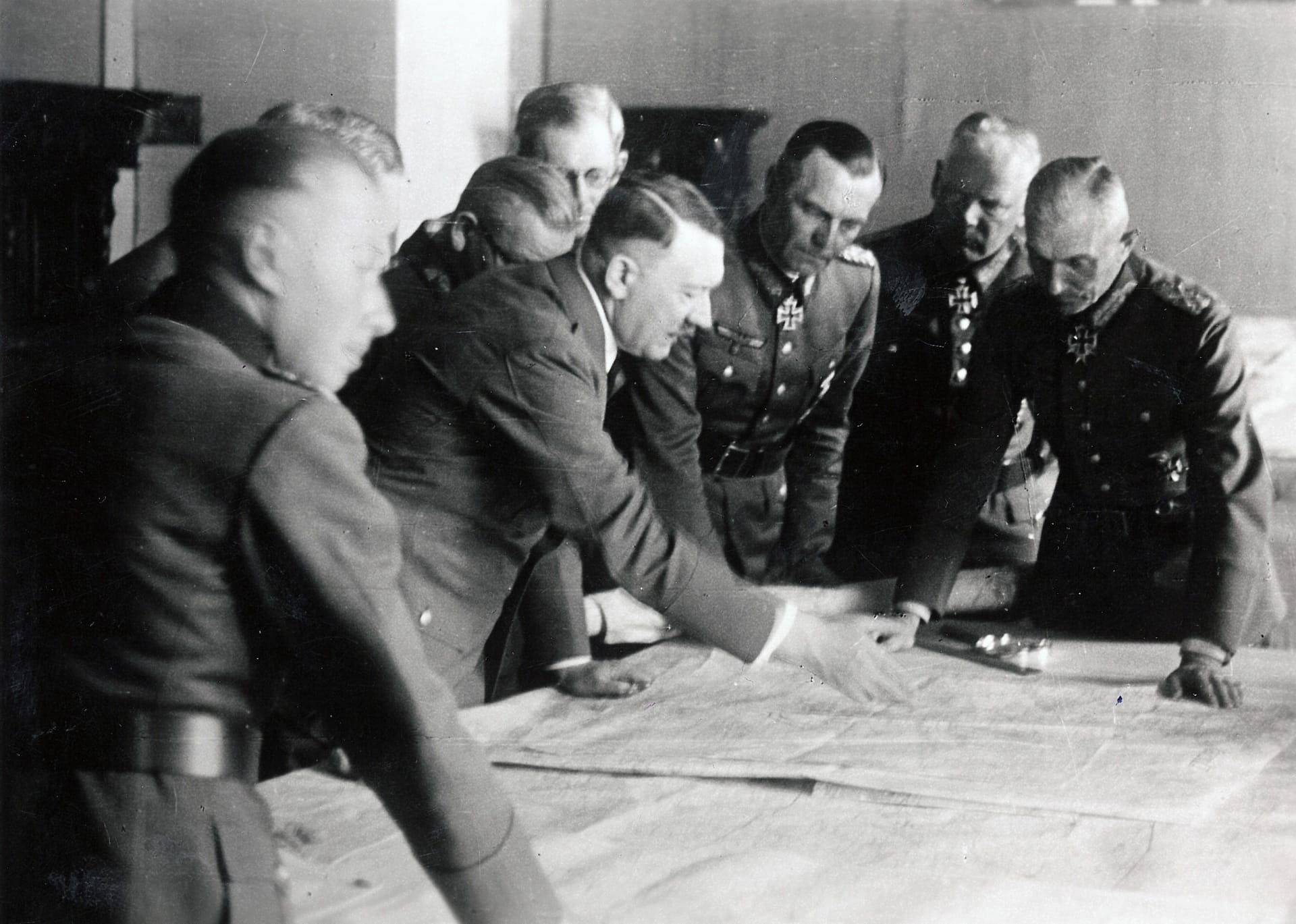
Adolf Hitler with generals Friedrich Paulus, Adolf Heusinger and Fedor von Bock in Poltava, German-occupied Ukraine, June 1942

Meanwhile, Germany wanted to capture Stalingrad to cut the Soviet's transportation hub with southern Russia, which would let the Germans take the Caucasus region and its oil fields. It would also be a symbolic victory to capture the city that included Joseph Stalin's name. On 5 April 1942, Hitler confirmed Case Blue, which planned to destroy the Soviet forces in the south, and then afterwards, go north to take Moscow or finish taking the Caucasus. On 28 June, Fedor von Bock's Army Group South began the operation. On 9 July, Hitler amended Operation Blue to involve the taking of Stalingrad and the Caucasus at the same time. Army Group South would be split into Army Group A, led south by Wilhelm List, and Army Group B, led to Stalingrad by Bock. Days later, Bock was replaced by Maximilian von Weichs. The Soviets had faced encirclement until Army Group B split, allowing them to retreat eastwards.

Army Group A captured Rostov-na-Donu and went into the Caucasus in Operation Edelweiss. Army Group B's advance was Operation Fischreiher. Hitler then reassigned the 4th Panzer Army in Army Group B to help out Army Group A. Stalin and the Soviet high command formed the Stalingrad Front of multiple armies: the 21st, 62nd, 63rd, and 64th Armies, as well as the 8th Air Army. He ordered them on 28 July to take "Not One Step Back" and defend Stalingrad. He disallowed the evacuation of civilians from the city, for the purpose of motivating soldiers who would be defending civilians. Hitler then moved the 4th Panzer Army to move north and attack Stalingrad from the south. On the way there, the 4th Panzer Army converged with the 6th Army.

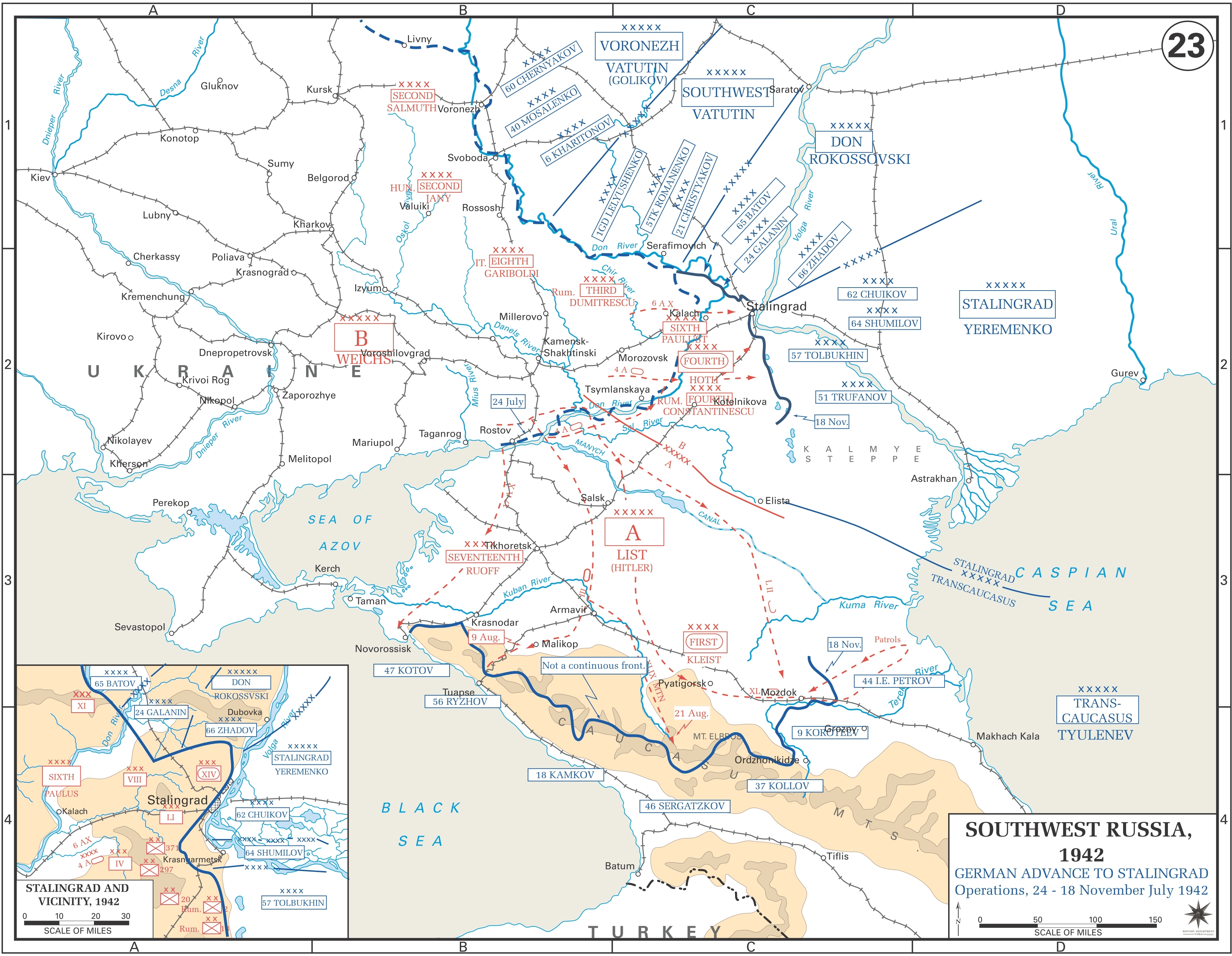
The German advance to Stalingrad from 24 July to 18 November 1942

On 23 August 1942, the Battle of Stalingrad began, as a German spearhead attacked the city from the north and the Luftwaffe began bombing. The fighting was some of the most intense of World War II, as the Soviets and Germans fought over blocks and buildings. The Germans pushed the Soviets through the city until they only occupied a strip of the city near the Volga river 15 kilometres long and 3 to 5 kilometres wide. The Soviets on the other side of the river took supply crossings into the city. On 14 October, the Germans fired on a supply crossing, greatly hurting the Soviets. As winter came, the Germans faced heavy losses and fatigue.

From 19 to 23 November 1942, the Soviets launched Operation Uranus, a large counteroffensive formulated by Zhukov, Aleksandr Vasilevsky, and Nikolai Voronov. It attacked the weak and undefended flanks of the 4th Panzer Army and 6th Army, greatly surprising the Germans. The German high command asked Hitler to allow the 6th Army, which was fighting near the Volga, to join the rest of the German forces in the west of the city, but Hitler ordered the leader of the 6th Army, Friedrich Paulus, to stay at the Volga. The Luftwaffe made minor deliveries of supplies to the 6th Army.

In mid-December 1942, Hitler began Operation Winter Storm, forming a special army corps led by Erich von Manstein which would help the 6th Army. The operation failed, and Hitler told the troops to fight to the death. On 10 January 1943, the Soviets began Operation Koltso, which surrounded the 6th Army. On 31 January, Paulus disobeyed Hitler by surrendering, and soon, 22 generals surrendered with him. By 2 February, the remaining 91,000 German men had surrendered. There were more than 800,000 Axis casualties, 1.1 million Soviet casualties, and 40,000 civilian casualties. Many of the surrendering Germans were put in Soviet prison camps. In the Third Battle of Kharkov from 18 February to 20 March 1943, Erich von Manstein recaptured Kharkov despite being outnumbered by the Soviets 7-to-1.

=== Dieppe Raid (1942) ===
Operation Jubilee or the Dieppe Raid was the first time American troops fought on French soil in the war. It was a commando raid on Dieppe, France, that was supposed to be significantly more destructive than previous raids. 5,000 British, American, and Canadian engaged in paratrooper landings and amphibious attacks on the fortified port of Dieppe in a move designed to divert German attention away from the Eastern Front at Stalin's request. Launched on 19 August 1942, the raid was a disaster for the Allies, as half of their force was killed.

=== Planning the invasion of Italy (1943) ===
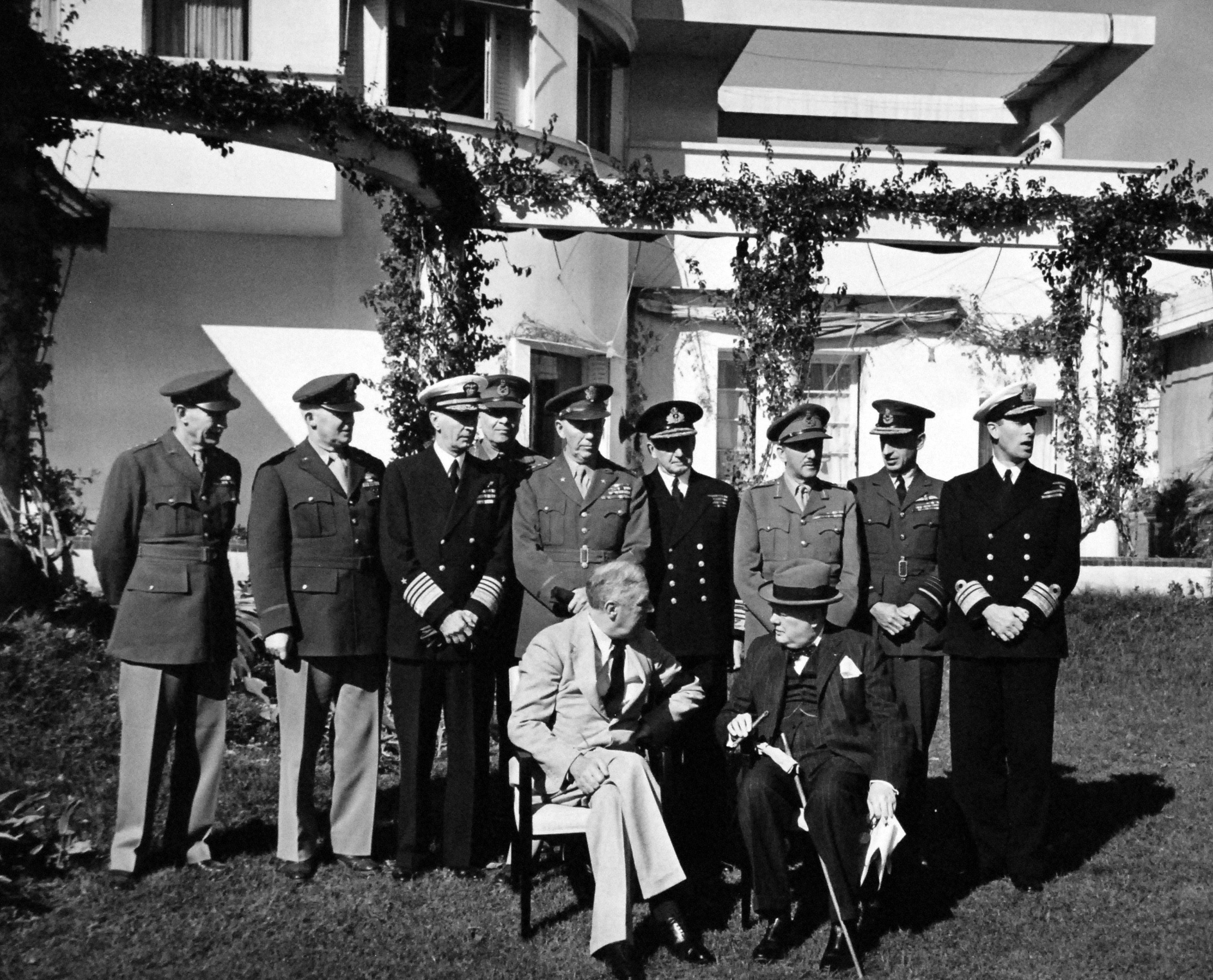
Churchill, Roosevelt, and their Chiefs of Staff at the Casablanca Conference in January 1943

Roosevelt, Churchill, de Gaulle, and French general Henri Giraud attended the Casablanca Conference in Casablanca, French Morocco from 14 to 24 January 1943. The conference, with the knowledge that the North African campaign would be over soon, heavily focused on the idea of opening a front against the Axis to relieve the pressure on the Soviets on the Eastern Front. The leaders debated invading occupied France or Italy first, and they decided to invade Italy later that year and invade France in 1944.

As the Allies prepared for the invasion, they formulated Operation Mincemeat; they wanted to take Axis attention off the island of Sicily, which would be invaded first. British intelligence took the body of a homeless worker who died of ingesting rat poison, and disguised him as a Major in the British Royal Marines named "William Martin", fitting him with various documentation that established the fake identity. On 30 April, the British submarine HMS Seraph dropped his body off the coast of Spain, intending for him to be discovered by the Axis, who would find a note on his person that mentioned the Allies were planning to invade Greece and the island of Sardinia, launching a small attack on Sicily as a feint. The mission was successful, as German intelligence officers in Spain found the body and directed false intelligence to higher Axis authorities, who built up troops in Greece and Sardinia.

== Allied resurgence (1943–1945) ==
=== Allied bombings in Germany (1943) ===
In 1943, the Allies attacked three dams in the German Ruhr region (a valley and industrial center): the Eder, Möhne, and Sorpe dams. This was essential, as they secured the water supply for the region and generated electricity. The plan originated in 1937, but the technology for it was not yet invented; the dams were protected by anti-aircraft guns and the presence of torpedo nets in the waters below. In 1942, the British invented the "bouncing bomb", which could skip along the surface of the water instead of getting caught in the nets. On the night of 16–17 May 1943, in Operation Chastise, the RAF successfully bombed the dams. 53 of the 133 British air crew were killed, and around 1,300 people on land were killed by flooding. It provided a morale boost to the British.

The German city of Hamburg was a key location in the German war effort, functioning as a manufacturing plant for U-boats and a shipyard to store them, as well as a transportation hub for occupied Europe. Arthur Harris identified this as a target for an Allied air attack in summer 1943. He planned a 10-day bombing raid named Operation Gomorrah. It was scheduled to start on 22 July, but was delayed until the 24th. The Brits and Americans dropped a significant amount of bombs over a few days, and dropped bits of tin foil from their planes to confuse the Luftwaffe radar systems. A second raid was launched on the 27th, a third on the 29th and 30th, and the final raid on 2 to 3 August. Operation Gomorrah greatly demoralised the Germans; German Armaments Minister Albert Speer wrote: "Hamburg... put the fear of god in me.” The city quickly rebuilt, however, producing 80% of its original output within five months.

By fall 1943, General Hap Arnold of the U.S. Air Force had grown disappointed with the U.S.' Eighth Air Force, which had been bombing German targets since January but faced heavy losses in the process. In August, U.S. air planners formed an operation to respond to Arnold's belief that the Eighth exemplified perceptions of air power being ineffective amidst the wider war. In the Schweinfurt-Regensburg mission, the 1st and 3rd Air Divisions of the Eighth were to destroy many German ball bearing factories in Schweinfurt, Germany, as well as a factory for Messerschmitt aircraft in Regensburg, Germany, at the same time. It was planned for the 7th but delayed to the 17th. The targets were hit, and German manufacturing was damaged in the short-term, but the Eighth still suffered many losses and did not go on unescorted night raids into Germany for months afterwards.

The Allies launched a bombing raid of Bremen on 8 October 1943, followed by Marienburg on the 9th and Munster on the 10th.

On 14 October, German ball bearing factories were attacked again in the Second Schweinfurt raid.

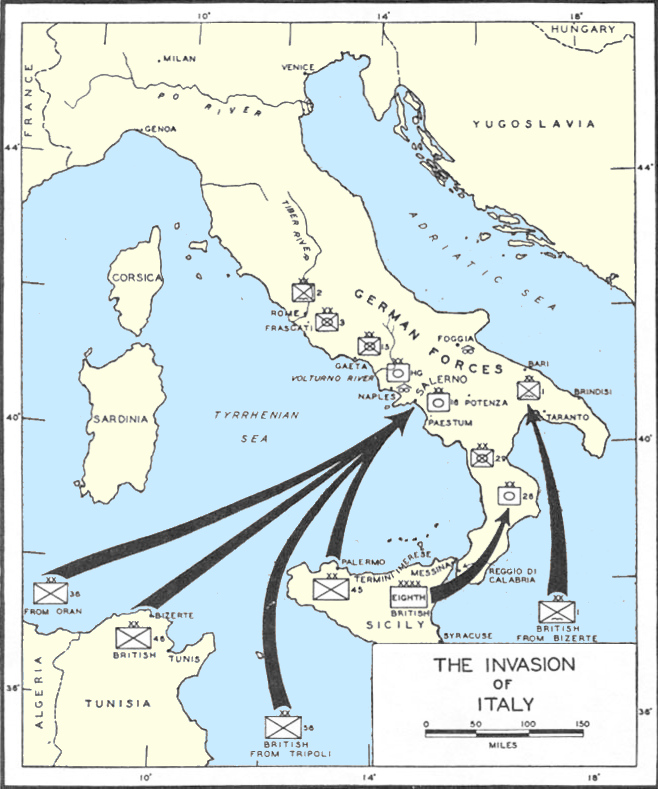
The Allied invasion of Italy in 1943

=== Italian campaign (May–August 1943) ===
In May 1943, the Allies won the North African campaign, and captured many Axis soldiers and military equipment. On 20 May, the invasion of Italy began. From 20 May to 13 June, they took the islands of Pantelleria, Lampedusa, and Linosa. On 9 July 1943, the Allies began an invasion of Sicily in Operation Husky. The Allies faced little resistance while establishing beachheads, and were able to take the rest of the island partially due to their frequent resupplying of soldiers to the front.

On the night of 24–25 July, Mussolini told the Italian Fascist Grand Council that Germany was considering evacuating southern Italy. The Council voted for a resolution against him, who resigned. King Victor Emmanuel III ordered Mussolini to be arrested and for a new government to be formed by Marshal Petro Badoglio. On 17 August, the Allies finished the conquest of Sicily. There were 23,000 Allied casualties and 165,000 Axis casualties, 30,000 of them Germans.

=== Eastern Front (July–November 1943) ===
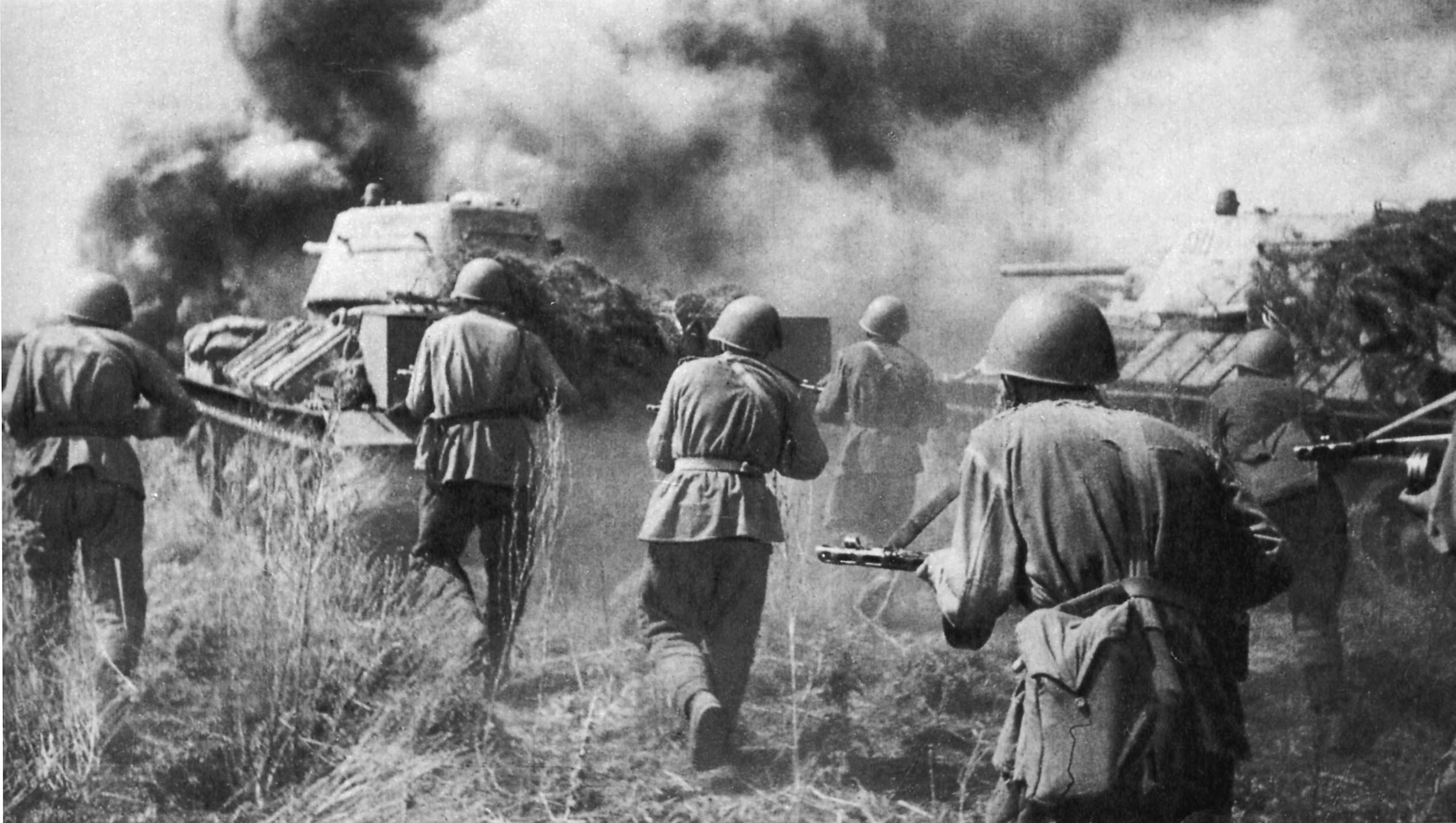
Soviet troops counterattacking during the Battle of Kursk in July 1943

On 5 July 1943, the Germans began Operation Citadel, an assault on a bulge in the Soviet salient around the city of Kursk. The bulge went 100 miles west towards the German lines. 900,000 German troops attacked from the north and south, beginning the Battle of Kursk. It was the largest tank battle in history, involving 6,000 tanks among both sides. The Soviets had predicted the attack, and moved their main forces out of the area. They had also placed minefields and antitank defences, which costed the Germans. On the 9th, the Allies began invading Sicily, and Hitler had to move troops there from the Eastern Front. Meanwhile, the Soviets began a buildup of forces, and on 12 July, they counterattacked. The Soviets' better numbers allowed them to make a larger offensive; they took back Orel on 5 August and Kharkov on 23 August. There were 800,000 Soviet casualties and 200,000 German casualties.

In spring and summer 1943, the Jews in the Warsaw and Bialystok ghettos engaged in armed resistance against the Germans. The same happened at the Treblinka extermination camp on 2 August and the Sobibor extermination camp on 14 October. In retaliation, in autumn 1943, Heinrich Himmler began Operation Harvest Festival, the killing of the 45,000 Jewish prisoners that remained in forced labour in the Lublin District of occupied Poland. The operation began on 3 November, and Jews were killed at the Majdanek, Poniatowa, and Trawniki work camps within days. 42,000 of them ended up being killed in the Germany's largest massacre in the Holocaust.

From 3 to 23 August 1943, in the Fourth Battle of Kharkov, the final battle in the city, the Soviets attempted to once again capture Kharkov. von Mainstein was urged by Hitler not to give up the city, but von Manstein retreated back across the Dnieper River. 50,000 Soviets and 9,000 Germans were killed.

=== Italian campaign (September–October 1943) ===
On 2 September 1943, the Allies made a small landing at the Apulia peninsula in Italy, which surprised the Germans. This front led to the Allies capturing the ports of Brindisi and Taranto, but they did not have the resources to continue north for two weeks. On 3 September, the British crossed the Strait of Messina between Sicily and mainland Italy. Little progress was made on this front as well, because of a poor road network which stopped larger Allied mobilisation. At the same time, the new Italian government began secretly collaborating with the Allies. Britannica writes: "It was understood [by the new government] that Italy would be treated with leniency in direct proportion to the part that it would take, as soon as possible, in the war against Germany." The government surrendered to the Allies on the 8th, yet Germans and Italians remaining loyal to the Axis fought with the Allies in Italy over the next two years.

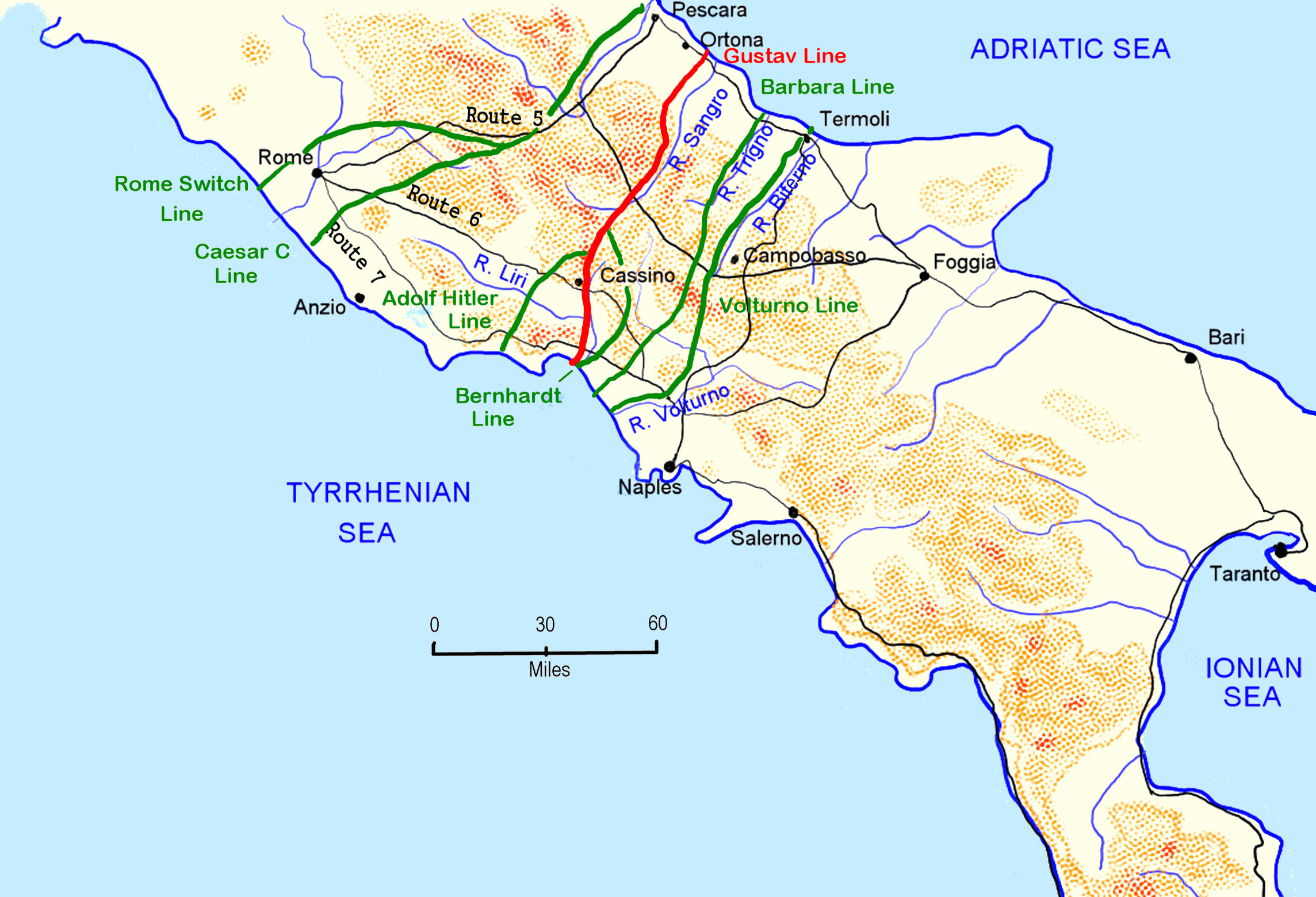
A map of the German "Winter Line" defences in central Italy in 1943 and 1944, with the primary Gustav Line highlighted. The black lines on land show the various Allied advances towards Rome.

On 9 September 1943, the Allied Fifth Army, led by U.S. General Mark W. Clark and made up of 55,000 Americans and Brits, landed at Salerno, south of the city of Naples. They were later supported by 115,000 more troops. For a week, they faced the German 16th Panzer Division led by Field Marshal Albert Kesselring, who were outnumbered but gave more resistance than expected because they had been preparing since the resignation of Mussolini. By this time, the Allies landed at Bari, north of Brindisi, and captured Foggia without opposition; this group now faced the rear of the Germans in Naples. The Germans thus retreated and on 1 October, the Allies entered the city. Kesselring's forces then solidified a new hold on northern Italy, and the Germans made the "Gustav Line" of defences in a 160-kilometer (100-mile) line across Italy between the mouths of the Gargliano and Sangro rivers, notably crossing the town of Cassino. The Italian government declared war on Germany on 13 October 1943. The Nazi High Command announced it would not cede Italy to the Allies as it began a war of attrition south of Rome.

=== Battle of the North Cape (1943) ===
In December 1943, Germany became aware of two British convoys sailing above Norway through the Arctic Circle to bring supplies to the Soviet Union on their northern coast. German battleship Scharnhorst and five destroyers left Altenfjord on the north coast of Norway and went north to intercept the convoys. This began the Battle of the North Cape on 25 December. On the 26th, the German destroyers were ordered to return to the coast, leaving the Scharnhorst up against a large British force. The Scharnhorst was sunk and 1,927 Germans were killed, only 36 of them surviving after being rescued by the British.

=== Eastern Front (December 1943 – April 1944) ===
On 24 December 1943, Nikolai Vatutin's Soviet forces broke out of their salient in Kiev and soon retook Zhytomyr and Korosten. Throughout 1944, the Germans on the Eastern Front faced having less troops while needing to defend the same wide frontlines. In January, the Germans' surrounding of Leningrad was weakened. On 4 January 1944, the Soviets crossed the pre-war Polish borders. Erich von Manstein's German forces slowed Vatutin's progress, but Germany lost many soldiers, and their defensive line across the Eastern Front was weakened. The Soviets used this to capture Lutsk in modern Ukraine on 5 February. In March, the Soviets crossed the Dnieper and Bug rivers, coming near Romania and Hungary. Hitler reinforced his troops in Hungary to stop further Soviet advance into central Europe, and to maintain his control of the Balkans. On 1 April, Zhukov attempted to break through these defences into Hungary, but was unsuccessful. Later that month, the Soviets regained the Crimea and Odessa, and German troops left Sevastopol. In May, Germany stabilised the Eastern Front, but they were "unstable, both politically and militarily, under the surface."

=== Italian campaign (January–June 1944) ===
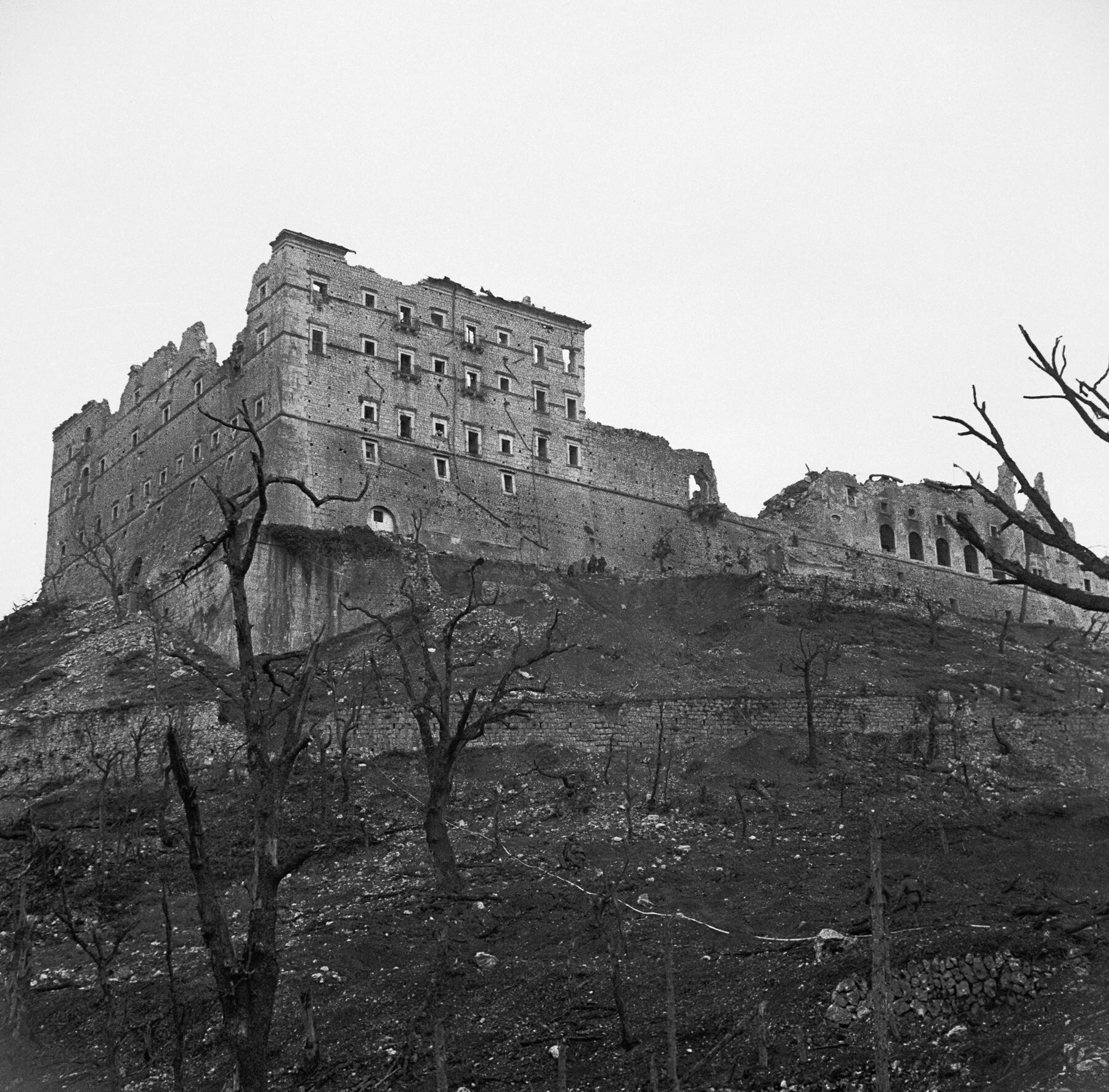
The monastery atop Monte Cassino in ruins on 19 May 1944, one day after the Battle of Monte Cassino ended

The Battle of Monte Cassino in Italy lasted from 17 January to 18 May 1944. Monte Cassino was a hill that, if captured, could be used by the Allies to break through the Gustav Line across Cassino. The hill, on whose summit lied an old Benedictine monastery, overlooked the highway to Rome which is named the A1 today. The first engagement of the wider battle was from 17 January to 11 February, where U.S. and French troops fought elite paratroops of the Luftwaffe; the Allies were pushed back. The second engagement was from 15 to 18 February and involved Allied troops from India and New Zealand. It included Operation Avenger, in which the Allies bombed the monastery. However, the ruins of the monastery ended up being a more effective defensive position for the Germans, who again pushed back an Allied assault. The third engagement from 15 to 26 March was again a loss for the Allies, mainly British and Canadians. The fourth engagement from 11 to 18 May, headed by Polish Allies. They faced intense resistance, but they took the summit of Monte Cassino on the 18th, which by then was mostly abandoned by the Germans. The wider battle led to 105,000 Allied and 80,000 German casualties.

The Battle of Anzio, the Allied amphibious landing at Anzio, Italy, was from 22 January to 5 June. The landing allowed the Allies to bypass the Gustav Line. 36,000 Allied soldiers took Anzio and then the nearby town of Nettuno, facing little resistance. They then spent time securing the beachhead, falsely assuming they need to secure their position before further advancements, when the path to Rome was generally undefended. British general Harold Alexander and American general John P. Lucas debated whether to more quickly push towards Rome, making little gains in the process. This gave time for the Axis to start a counteroffensive towards Anzio on 2 February; the offensive reached its peak on the 17th, and the Allied beachhead was reduced in size, but the Allies held on. The 135,000 German troops attacking Anzio were needed on the Eastern Front, and both fronts had fewer people than they needed. Neither side made significant gains over the next few months, but German power was reduced as some of the troops were sent south. On 23 May, the Allies broke out of the bridgehead, and the Germans retreated from the defensive line. On 4 June 1944, the Allies liberated Rome. During the Battle of the Anzio, the Allies suffered 24,000 American and 10,000 British casualties, while the Germans had 27,500 casualties.

=== Allied invasion of Western Europe (1944) ===
The first day of the Allied invasion of Normandy in Operation Neptune

On 6 June 1944, American, British, Canadian, and Australian soldiers began the invasion of German-occupied western Europe, named Operation Overlord. In Operation Neptune, they invaded five different beaches in the French region of Normandy - nicknamed (from west to east) Utah, Omaha, Gold, Juno, and Sword - and established a beachhead. By the end of the day, the allies reached the French bocage, where they met intense German resistance.

The British 3rd Infantry Division, the first division to land on Sword Beach, was told to capture the French city of Caen, a major transportation hub. At the Battle for Caen towards the end of D-Day, two German panzer divisions and an infantry division annihilated the British. The city remained under German control for the next week. As the U.S. 1st Infantry Division made gains south of Omaha Beach, some Germans near Caen had to retreat, creating a gap in the western part of the city. In Operation Perch on 10 June, the British 7th Armoured Division moved into the gap. Major General Fritz Beyerlein, commander of the Panzer Lehr division, noticed the movement and sent troops to the village of Tilly-sur-Seulles in between the Brits and Caen to slow the advance. The British, in turn, decided to disengage from Tilly-sur-Seulles and attempt to outflank the Germans at the village of Villers-Bocage. In the Battle of Villers-Bocage, both sides took heavy losses, the British losing 217 men and the Germans losing an unknown amount; the Brits retreated. The Brits and Germans fought over Caen until August. Once the Germans lost Caen, they moved out of Villers-Bocage.

Meanwhile, in the Battle of Carentan from 10 to 14 June, the U.S. Army fought the Wehrmacht over the town of Carentan. The Germans retreated, securing for the Americans the corridor between the town, Utah Beach, and Omaha Beach. The Allies were then successful in the Battle of Cherbourg, breaking into the Cotentin Peninsula.

Allied advancements disrupted the German high command. In the 20 July 1944 plot, many figures of the German high command attempted to assassinate Hitler in East Prussia; Hitler took revenge on many people in the military, and Erwin Rommel and Günther von Kluge committed suicide.

In Operation Cobra, starting on 25 July 1944, the Allies broke out of the front with Germany, and started heading toward Brittany. Hitler ordered Operation Luttich to reestablish the front, but it failed.

On 15 August, the Allies landed in the French Riviera in Operation Dragoon, starting an invasion of southern France. The next day, Hitler allowed the Germans in Normandy to retreat. As they left, they were encircled by American and British spearheads at Falaise, creating the Falaise pocket. However, many Germans broke out between 16 and 19 August. By the time the Germans left Normandy, 50,000 of theirs were dead and 200,000 were taken prisoner.

=== Eastern Front (June–November 1944) ===
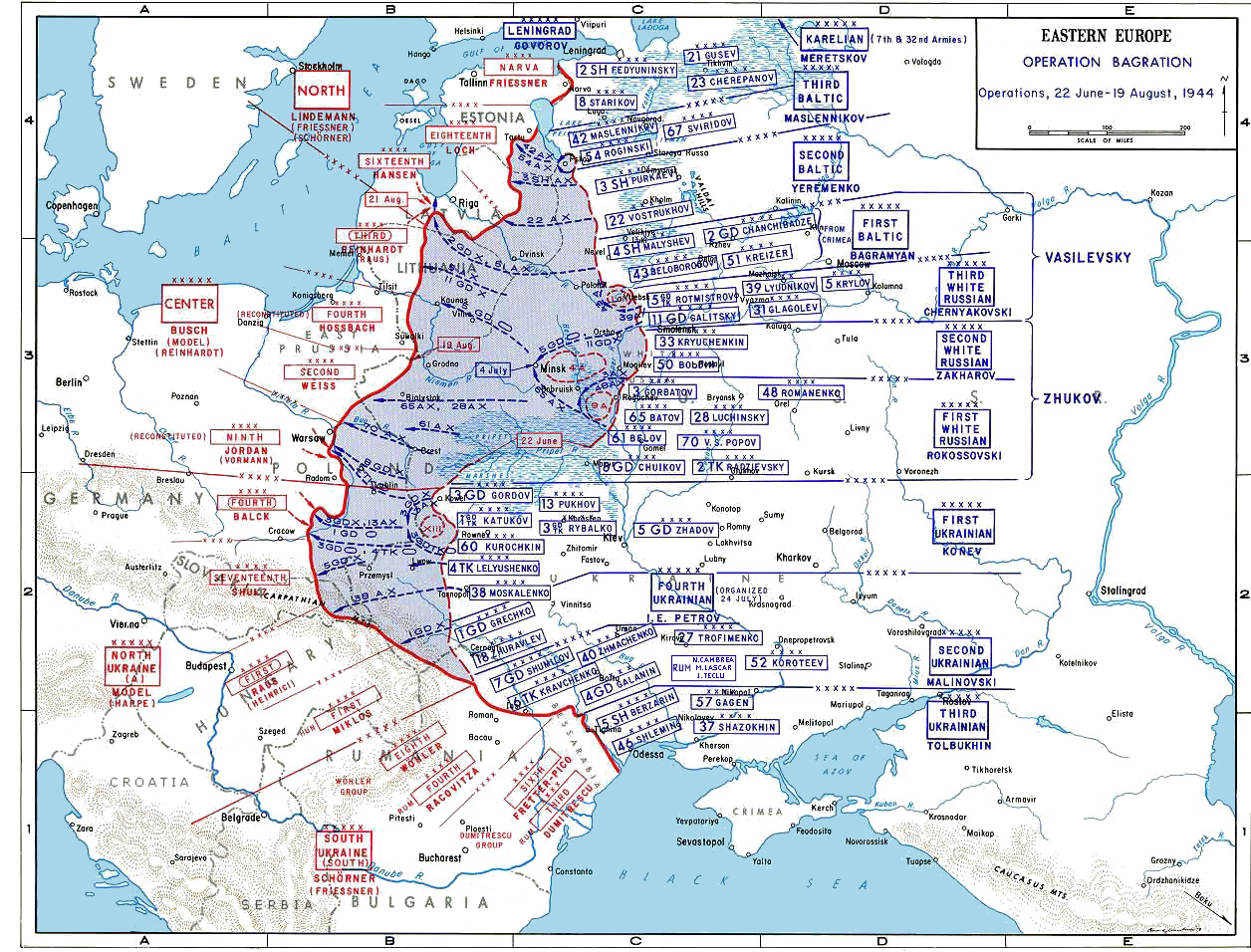
German and Soviet deployments during Operation Bagration from June to August 1944

On 23 June 1944, the Soviets launched a large counter-offensive, Operation Bagration, against Germany along a 450-mile front across eastern Europe. The Germans expected an offensive from the south and were surprised at the operation's scale. The Soviets were quickly successful, killing thousands within days. After reaching Minsk on 3 July, 100,000 Germans were killed. The way to Poland and Lithuania opened up to the Soviets. Lviv and all of Byelorussia were liberated by the end of July. From 22 to 23 July, Majdanek near Lublin, Poland became the first major Nazi concentration camp was liberated by the Allies. The Soviets then liberated Lublin on the 24th. Operation Bagration ended on 19 August 1944. There were 750,000 Soviet casualties and 360,000 to 670,000 German casualties.

As the Soviets advanced towards Warsaw in July 1944, they had promised aid to the underground resistance in the city, the Home Army, and encouraged them to start an uprising against the occupying Germans. The Home Army attempted to gain control over the city before the Soviets got there. Starting on 1 August, in the Warsaw Uprising, the Poles captured most of the city from a weakened German garrison. On 25 August, the Germans launched a successful and brutal counterattack. The Soviets gave aid to the Home Army on 13 September, but it was too late to significantly help them. The Home Army split into smaller units and continued the uprising, but they were forced to surrender on 2 October. The Germans deported the city's population and razed it. The Soviets had allowed the Germans to suppress the uprising, thus causing the end of the military organisation that supported the Polish government-in-exile located in London.

The Finns defeated the Soviets at the Battle of Tali-Ihantala in late June and early July 1944. The battle likely convinced Stalin that conquering Finland was not worth the cost, and the Moscow Armistice was signed on 19 September 1944. The Finns agreed to remove all German troops from Finnish territory.

On 20 August 1944, the Romanians formed a new government which sided with the Soviets and thus allowed them to pass through. They moved into Bulgaria and Yugoslavia. Germany began to move its forces out of Yugoslavia and Greece. In October, the Allies invaded Greece, but fought little resistance. Joseph Stalin and Winston Churchill then agreed that Greece would fall under the "British sphere of influence". In the Yugoslavian campaign of World War II, 1.2 million died, and in the Greek campaign, 300,000 died.

On 20 October 1944, Belgrade was liberated. Meanwhile, the Soviets reached Hungary. On 4 November, they reached Budapest, which was greatly defended. A siege began which lasted for months. The Soviet occupation of Hungary gave its anti-fascist parties the possibility to continue their political activities, and as the Soviets captured Debrecen, they held a parliamentary election and formed the Provisional National Government of Hungary rivalling the Nazi-backed government in Budapest, which continued the war on the side of Germany. Hungarian volunteers participated in the fights for Budapest on the Soviet side.

=== Western Front (August–September 1944) ===
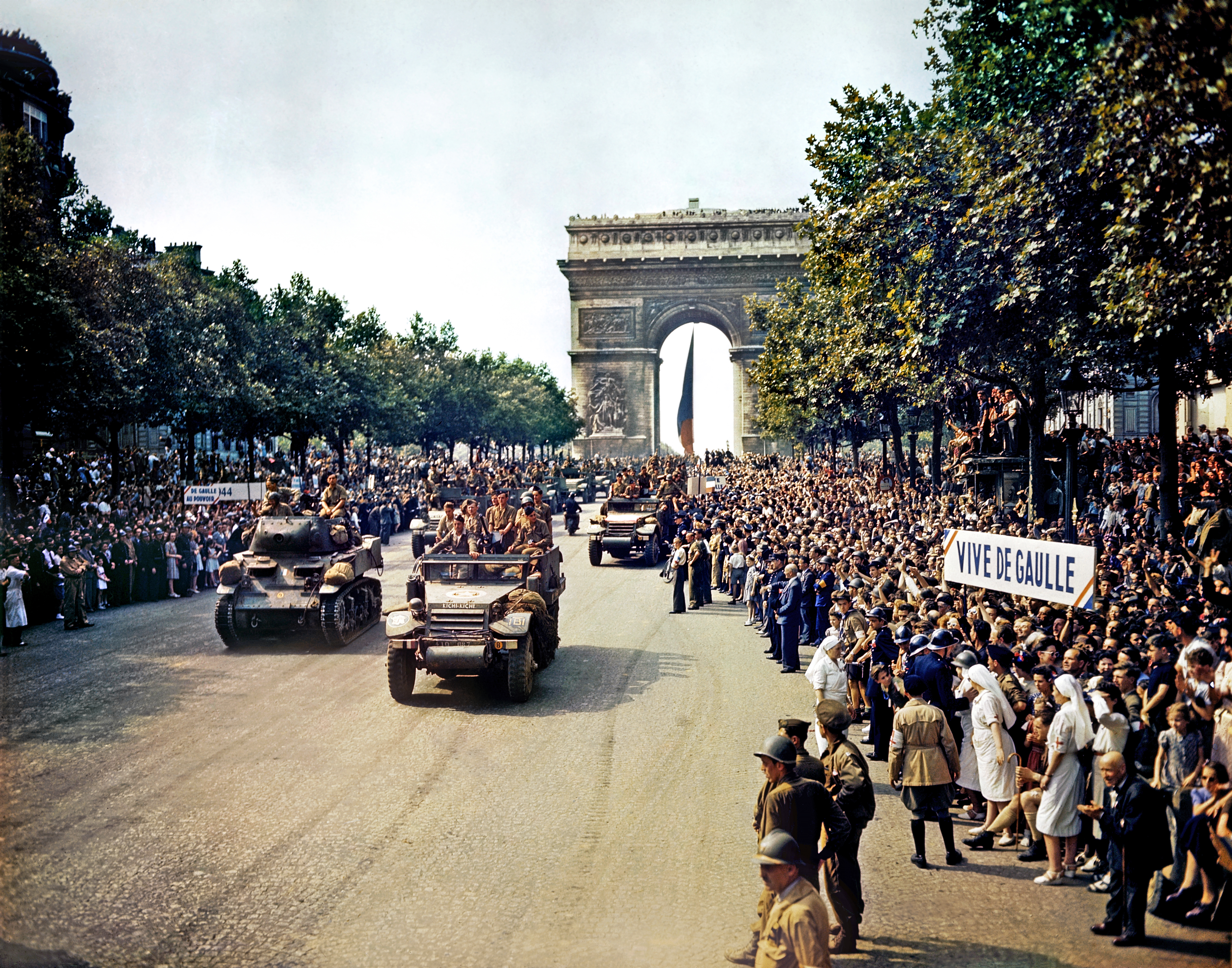
The Liberation of Paris on 26 August 1944

In 1944, during the invasion of France, American General Dwight D. Eisenhower at first was going to bypass Paris; however, on 19 August, the French in the city started a resistance against the remaining Germans, and the Allies headed towards the city. On 25 August, the Germans in Paris surrendered. By September, three Allied Army Groups were in line against German formations in the west. The pace of Allied gains was much quicker than the Allies themselves had estimated; by 11 September, they had reached eastward positions that were initially predicted to be reached around May 1945. There was optimism that the war in Europe might be over by the end of the year. Allied forces then reached the Siegfried Line, the German defensive line across western Europe. The Allies made minor gains in September and October, however, as Germans reinforced the front with new troops. From 17 to 24 September, in Operation Market Garden, the Allies sent three airborne divisions to seize road bridges in the Netherlands, to be held open for the British Second Army to cross. The Allies faced serious resistance on the ground, and the operation was abandoned.

The Allies then began heading towards the Roer river dams to stop the Germans from destroying them and flooding the area, which would delay the Allied advance. The fastest way to the dams was through Hurtgen Forest, which was one of the most fortified areas of the Germans. The Battle of Hurtgen Forest started on 19 September, as American troops forced their way through the forest. The advance was delayed by the events of the Battle of the Bulge. In October, in the Battle of Aachen, the U.S. Army faced one of its toughest urban battles in the city of Aachen, a German stronghold. It is located in the Aachen Gap, a stretch of flat land between the Allies' current position and the Ruhr region. The city of Aachen was one of the only major obstacles along the way. The U.S. captured the city after heavy losses.

The German western advance from 16 to 25 December 1944, the beginning of the Battle of the Bulge

The Battle of the Bulge was the last major German offensive of the Western Front. It was an attempt to push the western Allies away from Germany. It started on 16 December 1944. Germany's 5th and 6th Panzer Armies advanced west through the Ardennes Forest, attempting to cross the Meuse river. This caught the allies by surprise. The battle happened amidst extremely cold weather. On 17 December 84 American prisoners of war were murdered by the Germans in the Malmedy massacre. The Germans failed to reach the Meuse or take Bastogne, which was held by Americans. On 3 January 1945, the western Allies began a counterattack, and by 16 January, the battle was over. The Allies suffered 75,000 casualties, and the Germans 120,000.

Afterwards, German forces were not resupplied to the front in great numbers. This depletion of manpower stopped any chances of German large-scale resistance to the Allied invasion. In early February, the Battle of Hurtgen Forest continued, and the Allies captured the desired dams. The battle cost 33,000 American casualties.

=== Eastern Front (January–February 1945) ===
From January 1945, Hitler remained in Berlin at the Chancellery and its bunker, cancelling a plan to lead a resistance in southern Germany as the Soviets closed in on Berlin. Meanwhile, Germany unsuccessfully attempted to take back Budapest. On 12 January, the Soviets launched the Vistula–Oder offensive, crossing the Vistula river at Sandomierz. On the 14th, the armies of Zhukov and Konstantin Rokossovsky joined the offensive, greatly expanding its size. Warsaw was isolated and liberated on the 17th. Also on the 17th, those in the Auschwitz-Birkenau concentration camp who were still healthy were told to march west into more fortified German territory.

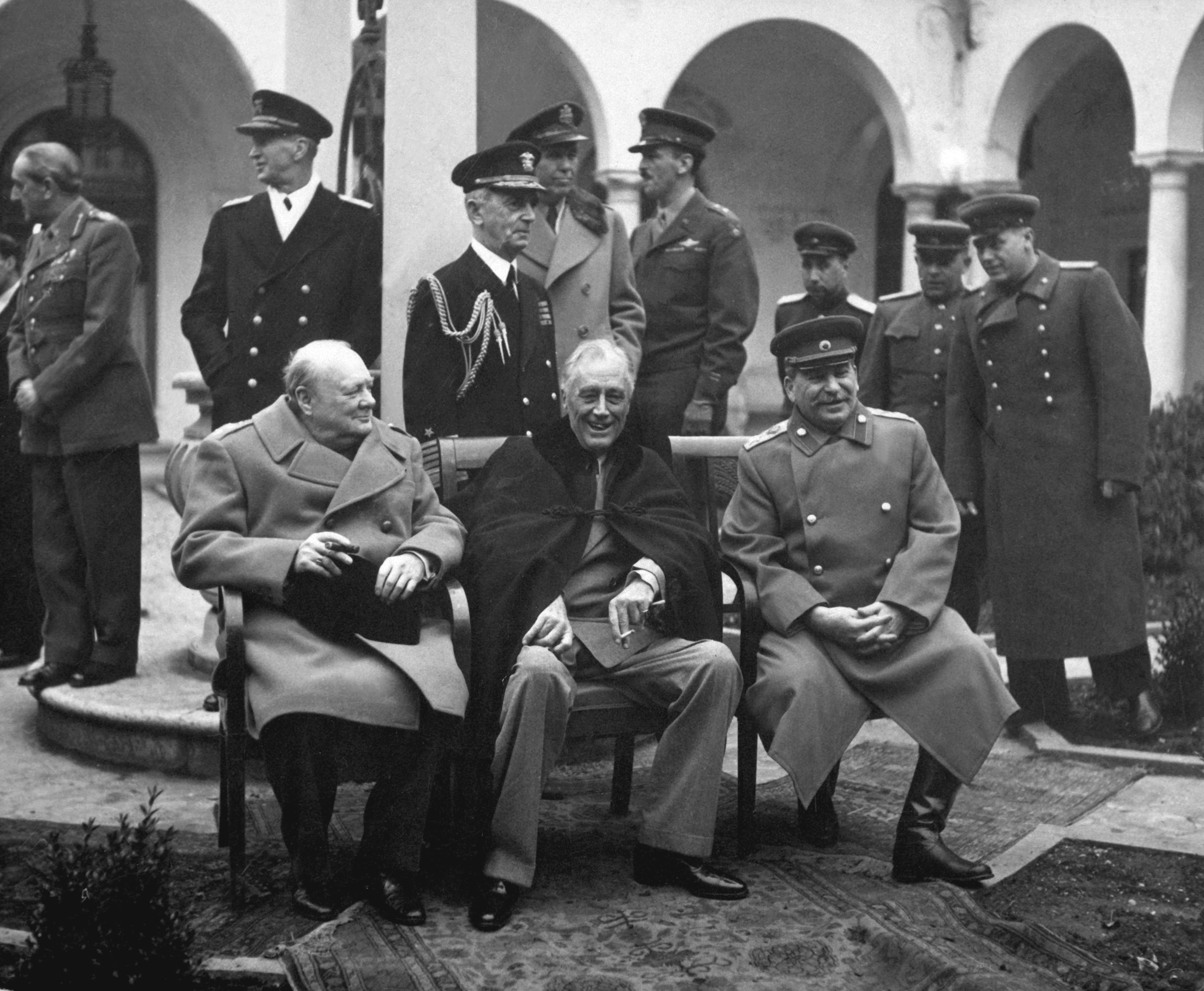
The "Big Three" Allied leaders at the 1945 Yalta Conference. From left to right in the foreground: Winston Churchill, Franklin D. Roosevelt, and Joseph Stalin.

Rokossovsky then moved into East Prussia. By 26 January 1945, he reached the Baltic Sea, isolating all German forces east of Danzig. Meanwhile, Ivan Konev's forces reached the Oder river, isolating the Germans in Upper Silesia. On the 27th, the Soviets liberated those were left behind at Auschwitz, and the Siege of Leningrad ended. Zhukov went through the corridor between the Vistula and Warta rivers and reached Brandenburg in Germany on 30 January. The Germans at this point benefited from a smaller front, meaning there was less to defend, but they were being attacked on both the western and eastern fronts. On 13 February, the Siege of Budapest ended, and the Soviets captured the city.

From 4 to 11 February 1945, Stalin, Roosevelt, and Churchill met at the Yalta Conference in Crimea. They created a plan for the defeat and occupation of Nazi Germany and its occupied states. They agreed to abolish or confiscate Germany's military industry, try war criminals before an international court, and create interim governments in Eastern Europe before further questions of their governance can be settled.

== End of the war in Europe (1945) ==
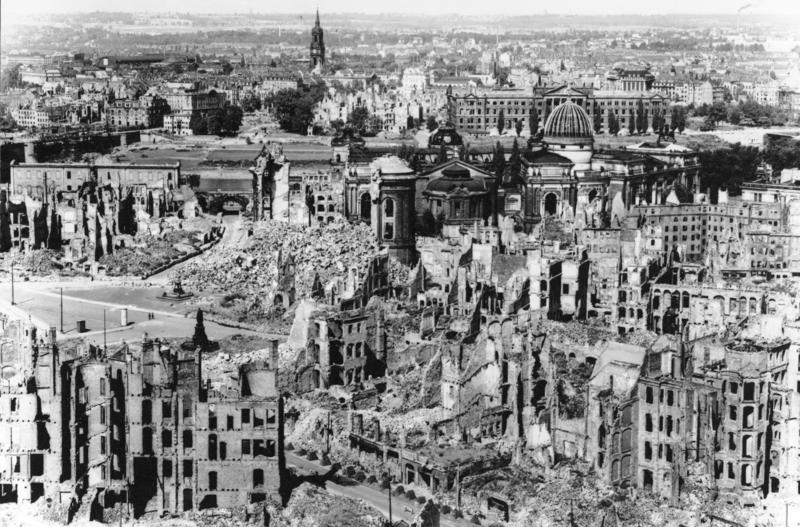
Dresden, Germany, after the Allied bombing of the city in February 1945

=== German losses (February–April 1945) ===
On 14 February 1945, a raid on Dresden produced one of the most devastating fires in history. A firestorm was created in the city, and between 18,000 and 25,000 people were killed.

20 to 25 February is known as the "Big Week" because of Operation Argument, in which Allied air forces took off from southern Italy to perform a series of bombing raids on German industrial targets such as aircraft factories. It significantly weakened the Luftwaffe.

In early March 1945, Allied troops began assaults to help them cross the Rhine. This allowed them to continue the invasion of Germany and encircle German forces in the Ruhr. On 7 March, at the Battle of Remagen, the Ludendorff Bridge spanning the Rhine at Remagen was attacked by the Germans, and its foundation collapsed, but the bridge ultimately sat intact over the river. This allowed the U.S. to establish a bridgehead on the other side. All four U.S. armies in Western Europe went over the Rhine in the next few weeks; the First and Ninth Armies encircled 300,000 German soldiers in the Ruhr pocket, while the Third and Seventh Armies continued on towards central and southern Germany. German Field Marshall Walter Model dissolved the army inside the Ruhr pocket, and the 300,000 were taken as prisoners of war.

From 6 to 15 March, the Germans engaged in Operation Spring Awakening in Hungary, the last major German offensive of the war. The goal was to attain Hungary's oil reserves (which were some of the last major reserves available to the Axis), as well as to prevent the Soviets from reaching Vienna. It was unsuccessful, and the Soviets began a counteroffensive on the 16th.

=== End of Nazi Germany (1945) ===
On 12 April 1945, Roosevelt died of a cerebral haemorrhage, and his vice-president Harry S. Truman succeeded him as U.S. president. On the 27th, as Allied forces closed in on Milan, Mussolini was captured by Italian Partisans. He was trying to flee Italy to Switzerland and was travelling with a German anti-air battalion. On 28 April, Mussolini and several of the other fascists captured with him were taken to Giulino di Mezzegra and executed by firing squad.

In April and May 1945, the Allies liberated the concentration camps of Buchenwald, Dachau, Dora-Mittelbau, Flossenburg, Mauthausen, Ravensbruck, Sachsenhausen, Stutthof, Bergen-Belsen, Treblinka, and Auschwitz.

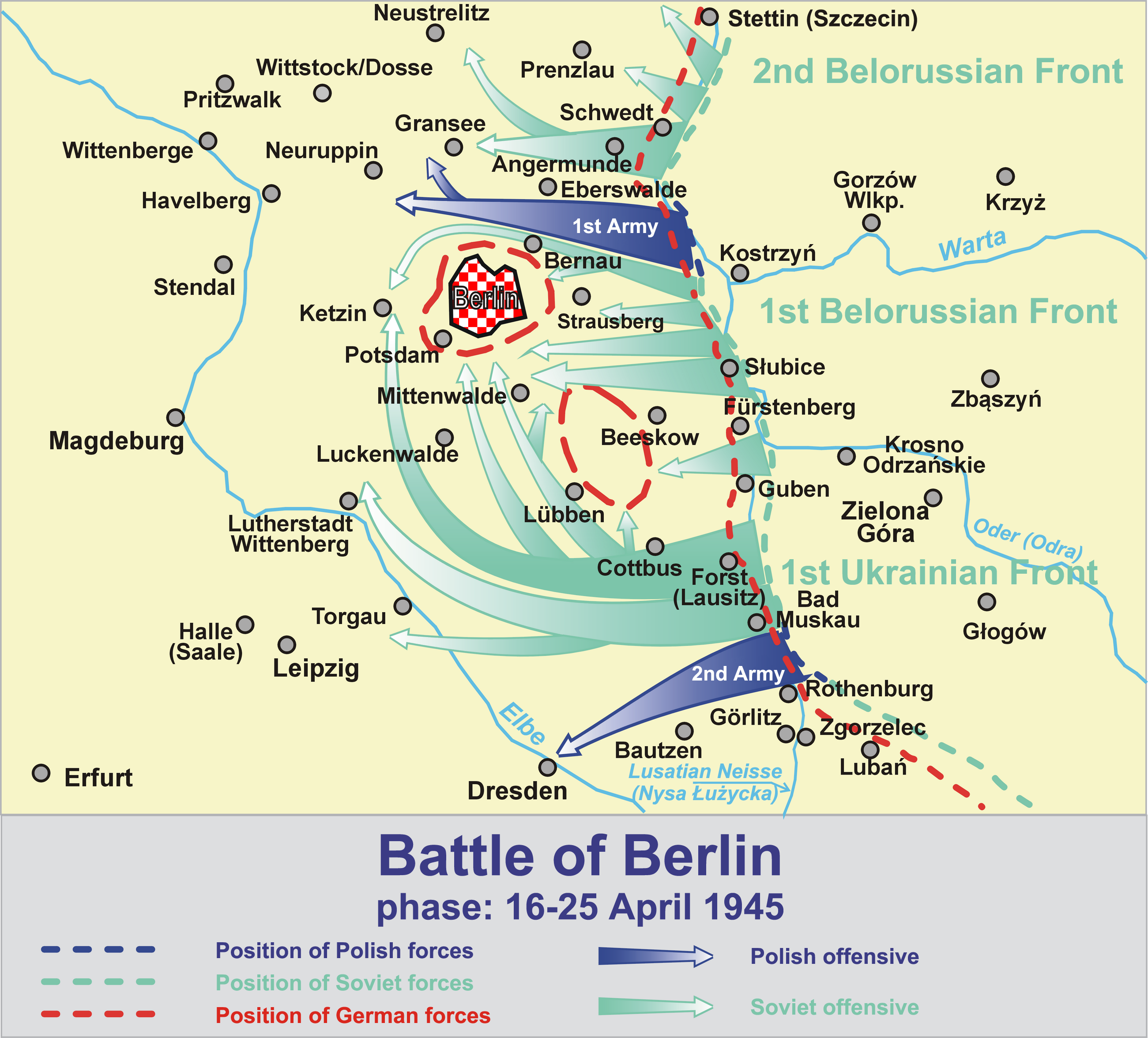
A map of the Battle of Berlin from 16 to 25 April 1945

The Battle of Berlin began on 16 April as the Soviets encircled the city and began shelling the last pockets of resistance with large amounts of artillery.

Hitler became exhausted and began to accept Germany's inevitable failure and the idea of him committing suicide. In his last will and testament, he appointed Grand Admiral Karl Dönitz as the new head of state and Joseph Goebbels as chancellor. On 30 April, Adolf Hitler, with his wife of one day, Eva Braun, committed suicide in his bunker. The German garrison commander, General Helmuth Weidling, then surrendered. Individual German troops continued fighting while the surrendered troops were captured and committed suicide. On 1 May, Joseph Goebbels and his wife committed suicide, at the same time organising the killing of their six children with poison. The Battle of Berlin ended on 2 May. It caused 100,000 Soviet casualties and an unknown number of German deaths. On 4 May, Dönitz went to British officer Bernard Montgomery's headquarters in Hamburg and surrendered the German forces in northern Germany, Denmark, and the Netherlands.

The next day, at the Battle for Castle Itter in Tirol, renegade German troops and American troops allied to stop the Waffen-SS from assaulting a stronghold filled with French politicians who were being held as prisoners. It was the only time Germans and Americans allied during the war.

On 7 May, Eisenhower accepted Germany's unconditional surrender of all their forces, which went into effect the next day. Norway was thus liberated. 8 May was Victory in Europe Day, and celebrations were had around the world. The Russian Federation celebrates 9 May as Victory Day. In northern Italy, anti-fascist parties formed a new national government which was led by Ferruccio Parri. On 20 May, Heinrich Himmler was captured by Russian soldiers, from there getting sent to British capture. On the 23rd, while his person was being searched, he bit down on a cyanide capsule that was hidden in his mouth, which was stored there in case of capture. On 5 June 1945, the Allies signed the Berlin Declaration, which formally took over the supreme authority of Germany, bringing about the end of Nazi Germany.

== Aftermath ==
39 million people died in the European theatre. More Soviet citizens died during World War II than those of all other European countries combined. Nazi ideology considered Slavs to be "subhuman" and German forces committed ethnically targeted mass murder. Civilians were rounded up and burned alive or shot in squads in many cities conquered by the Nazis. Russian government figures now estimate USSR losses within postwar borders to be at 26.6 million, including 8 to 9 million due to famine and disease. This figure includes 8 million dead Red Army troops died who faced the Axis on the Eastern Front.

At the Potsdam Conference of 17 July to 2 August 1945, the Allies formally agreed to many of the ideas considered at the Yalta Conference. Germany, Austria, and specifically Berlin and Vienna were all divided into four regions each occupied by the U.S., UK, France, and the Soviet Union. The countries used the "Five Ds" when governing these regions: "demilitarization, denazification, democratization, decentralization, and deindustrialization." European cities such as Berlin, Prague, and Dresden, had been destroyed, and many died during the abnormally strong winter later that year. The U.S. paid billions of dollars to rebuild Europe in the Marshall Plan.

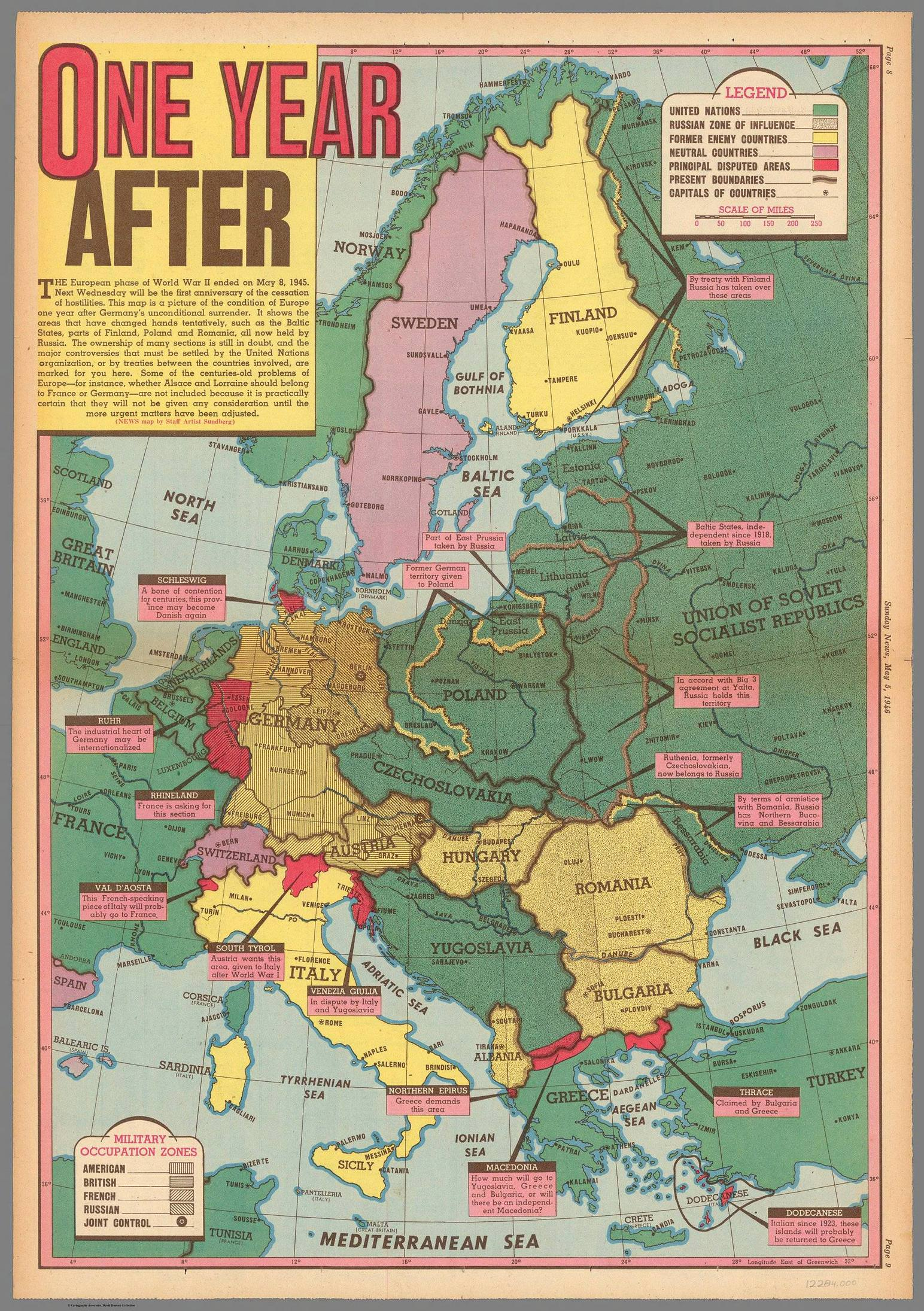
"One Year After" a 1946 American map showing the post-war changes to European borders

The Cold War started as the capitalist and communist former Allied states began fighting for control over the new global order. In 1949, the American, British, and French occupied regions of Germany became the capitalist West Germany, and the Soviets' region became the communist East Germany. Both governments were under the influence of their respective former occupants.

After Germany's concentration camps were liberated, many of their survivors lived in displaced persons camps for years. Many were afraid of antisemitism if they went back to their old homes in Europe, which drove many Jewish immigrants to the U.S.; in December 1945, the U.S. loosened immigration restrictions to receive those who were displaced by the Nazis. A lack of places that accepted Jews further motivated Zionism, an ideology promoting a Jewish state where the mostly-Arab state of Mandatory Palestine was located. The establishment of the Jewish state of Israel in 1948, which was supported by most major countries, began the Arab–Israeli conflict.

In the Nuremberg trials of 1945 to 1946, many officials of the Nazi high command were tried for war crimes, crimes against the peace, and crimes against humanity. Many were convicted and hanged. Karl Dönitz was sentenced to prison for ten years, leaving prison in 1956. He stayed in West Germany until his death in 1980. Albert Kesselring was sentenced to death in 1947, had his sentence changed to life imprisonment, and was pardoned and released in 1952, dying in West Germany in 1960. Meanwhile, Argentina's "fascist-leaning" president, Juan Perón, established "ratlines" (escape routes) in Italian and Spanish ports to smuggle Nazi officials facing potential war crimes prosecution into Argentina, where many of them lived or from which they moved to other South American countries. In 1960, Israeli intelligence agents abducted Adolf Eichmann, a leading figure of the Holocaust, from the city of Buenos Aires, Argentina. He was convicted of war crimes by an Israeli court in 1962 and executed. Another leading Holocaust architect, Josef Mengele, lived in multiple South American countries in the decades after the war, dying from a drowning in Brazil in 1979.

In Operation Overcast, later named Operation Paperclip, the U.S. secretly brought 1,600 German scientists and their families to work for the U.S. government, using "German intellectual resources to help develop America’s arsenal of rockets and other biological and chemical weapons, and to ensure such coveted information did not fall into the hands of the Soviet Union". Harry Truman forbade the recruiting of former Nazi officials or sympathizers, but the operation's leading organisations—the Joint Intelligence Objectives Agency and the Office of Strategic Services—ignored the stipulation, "eliminating or whitewashing incriminating evidence of possible war crimes from the scientists’ records".

== See also ==
- European–African–Middle Eastern Campaign Medal
- Military history of Italy during World War II
- Mediterranean and Middle East theatre of World War II
- Pacific War
- Allies at War (book)

Atlas of the World Battle Fronts
1943-07-01	1943-11-01	1944-07-01
1944-09-01	1944-12-01	1945-03-01
