= List of Reichstag deputies in the Third Reich (4th electoral term) =

This is a list of Reichstag deputies in the Third Reich (4th electoral term). The Reichstag of Nazi Germany existed from 1933 to 1945. Its 4th electoral term began with the parliamentary election of 10 April 1938 and lasted until the downfall of the Nazi regime in May 1945.

== Elections ==
The 10 April 1938 parliamentary election was the first held after the Anschluss of 12 March 1938 had incorporated Austria into Nazi Germany. Reflecting this fact, the parliament from this point forward was named Der Großdeutsche Reichstag (The Greater German Reichstag). In addition to the Reichstag deputies elected from Germany proper, a total of 73 new deputies were elected to represent the newly named Land Österreich, bringing the total number of members to 814. According to the official election results, almost 49 million votes were cast (99.6% turnout), 99.1% of them for the electoral lists of the NSDAP.

At the supplementary election conducted on 4 December 1938, 41 deputies from the recently annexed Sudetenland also entered the Reichstag. According to the official election results, almost 2.5 million votes were cast (98.61% turnout), 98.90% of them for the Nazi Party electoral list. The subsequent admission of deputies from other areas that became part of the Reich raised the final number of members of the 4th electoral term to 876.

== Sessions ==
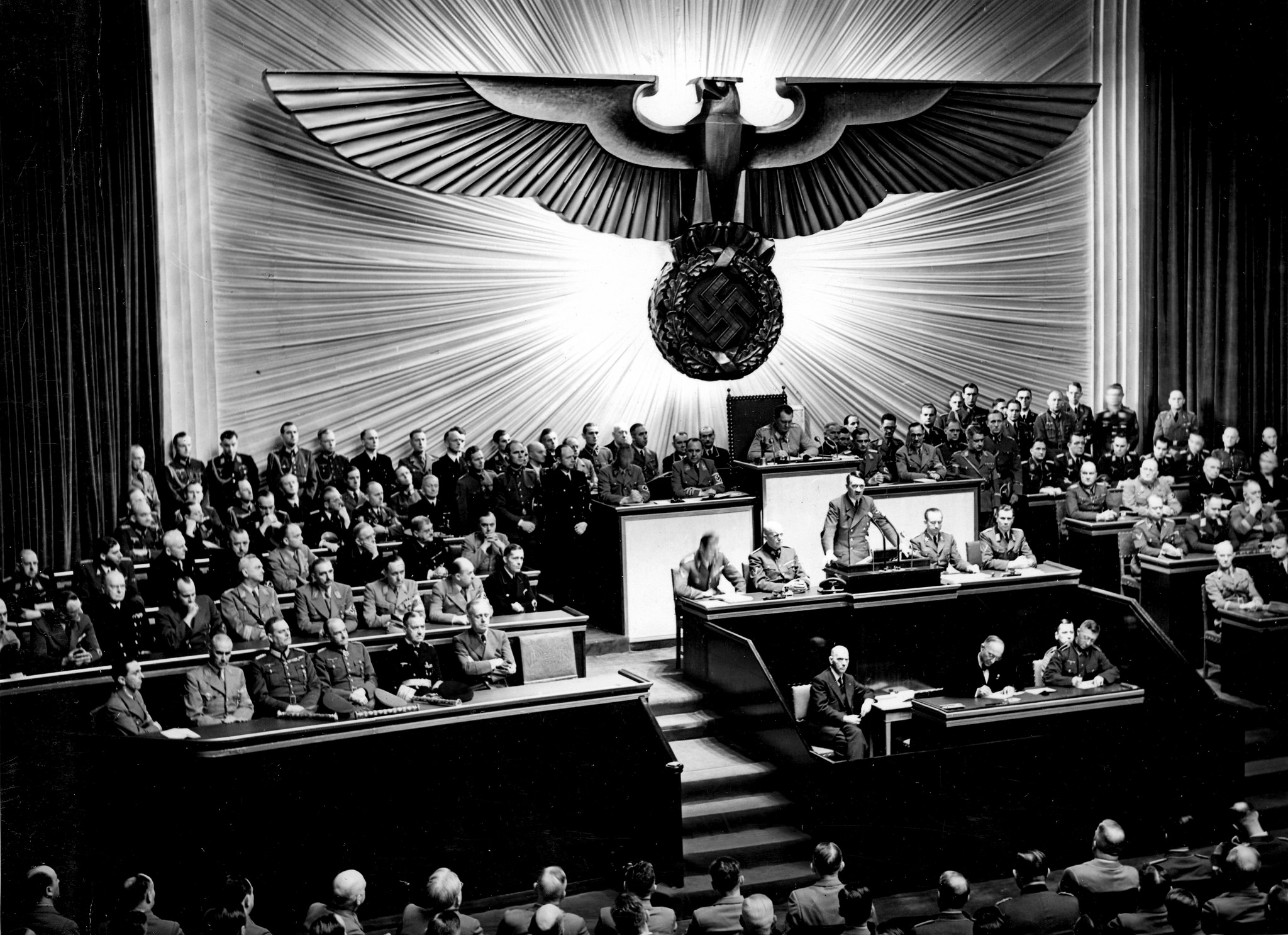
Adolf Hitler declared war on the United States at a meeting of the Reichstag on 11 December 1941

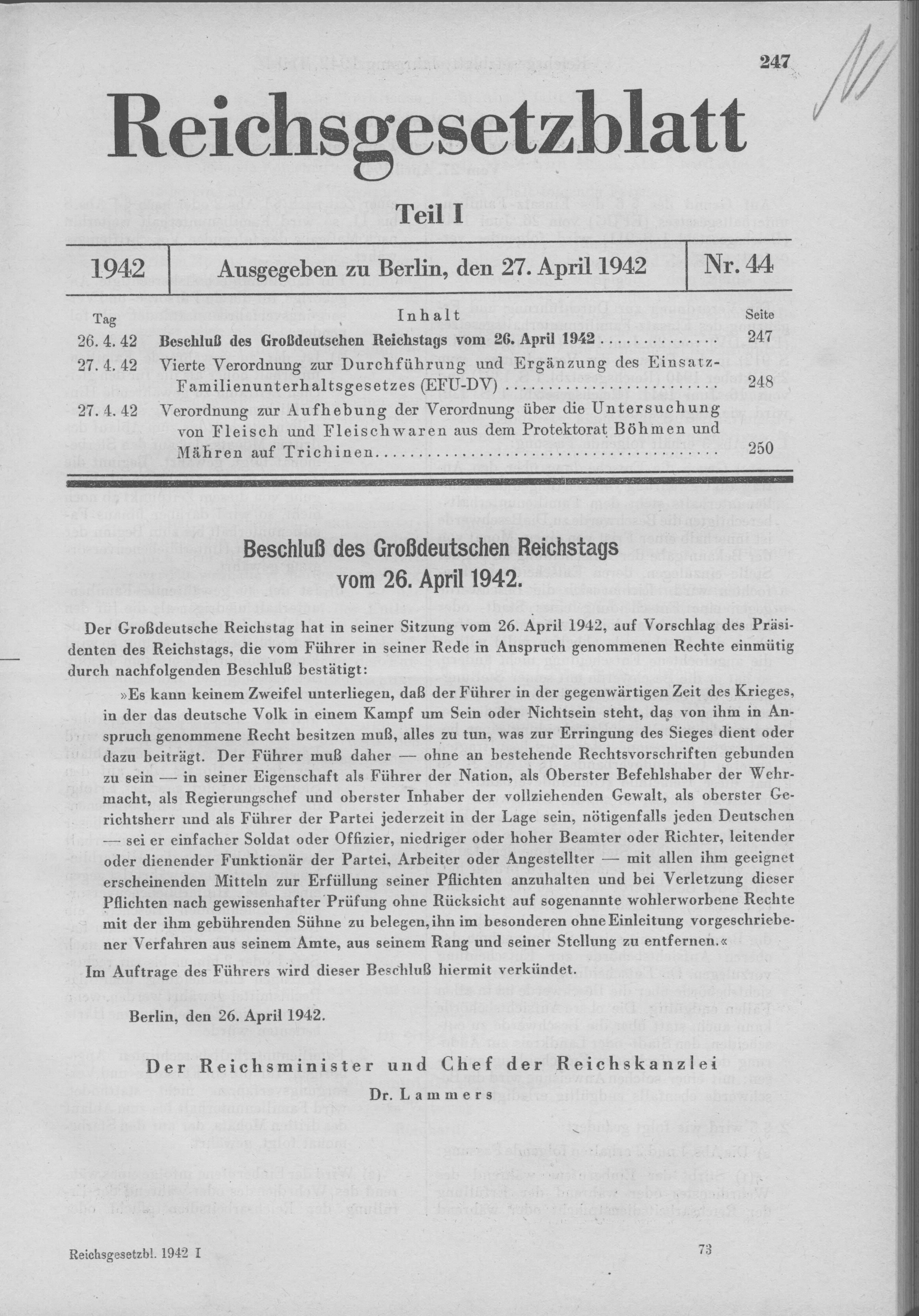
Publication in the 27 April 1942 Reichsgesetzblatt of the Reichstag resolution unanimously approved at its final session, declaring Adolf Hitler the "Supreme Judge of the German People"

The Reichstag members of the 4th electoral term met at the Kroll Opera House for eight sessions, the first being on 30 January 1939 and the last being on 26 April 1942. The only laws passed by the Reichstag during this time were the Law Extending the Enabling Act (30 January 1939) and the Law on the Reunification of the Free City of Danzig with the German Reich (1 September 1939). They also passed a resolution at their last session proclaiming Adolf Hitler "Supreme Judge of the German People", officially allowing him to override the judiciary and the civil service by removing judges and other officials without due process.

Reichstag Sessions – 4th Electoral Term
Session	Date	Notable Actions
1	30 January 1939	Reichstag passage of an extension of the Enabling Act
2	28 April 1939	Hitler speech canceling the 1934 non-aggression pact with Poland and demanding the return of Danzig
3	1 September 1939	Reichstag passage of a law incorporating Danzig into Germany
4	6 October 1939	Hitler speech after the conquest of Poland, offering a peace settlement with Great Britain and France
5	19 July 1940	Hitler speech after the fall of France, offering Great Britain a choice of peace or continued war
6	4 May 1941	Hitler speech reviewing the recent Balkans campaign
7	11 December 1941	Hitler speech issuing a declaration of war on the US
8	26 April 1942	Reichstag approval of a resolution naming Hitler as "Supreme Judge of the German People"

== Term extension ==
On 25 January 1943, Hitler extended the term of the Reichstag members until 30 January 1947 by enacting the Law on the Extension of the Electoral Term of the Greater German Reichstag. This sought to avoid having to hold elections during the Second World War. Due to Germany's defeat and surrender on 8 May 1945, no election was ever held.

== Presidium ==
The Reichstag Presidium, consisting of a president and three deputies, was elected en bloc at the first meeting on 30 January 1939.

Presidium of the Reichstag
Title	Incumbent
President	Hermann Göring
First Deputy	Hanns Kerrl
Second Deputy	Hermann Esser
Third Deputy	Emil Georg von Stauss (Note: A "guest" of the Nazi Party faction.)

== Members ==
The Law Against the Formation of Parties of 13 July 1933 established the Nazi Party (NSDAP) as the only legal political party. As a result, in all subsequent Reichstag terms, the only parliamentary faction allowed was that of the NSDAP. Members of the Reichstag who did not formally belong to the Nazi Party were listed as "guests" of the NSDAP faction. There were only eleven such members in the Reichstag seated in the 4th electoral term.

A total of 814 Reichstag deputies were elected on 10 April 1938. This was raised to 855 after the supplementary election of 4 December 1938. Eighteen deputies were elected from the national electoral list and the remainder from individual constituencies. A listing of the members follows. Changes in Reichstag membership due to deaths, resignations or expulsions occurring up until 8 May 1945, and any resulting replacements, are annotated in the "Notes" column.

=== Reichswahlvorschlag (Reich Electoral List) ===
The Reichswahlvorschlag was allocated 18 seats.

Name	Image	Birth	Death	Notes
Paul Bang		1879	1945	
Wilhelm Buße		1878	1965	Replaced Rudolf Hess, 27 November 1941
Heinrich Claß		1868	1953	
Charles Edward, Duke of Saxe-Coburg and Gotha		1884	1954	
Carl Croneiß		1891	1973	
Friedrich Everling		1891	1958	
Oskar Farny		1891	1983	
Ulrich Graf		1878	1950	
Rudolf Hess		1894	1987	Expelled, 12 May 1941
Alfred Hugenberg		1865	1951	
Wilhelm Kube		1887	1943	Died, 22 September 1943
Franz von Papen		1879	1969	
Wilhelm Reinhard		1869	1955	
Rudolf Schaper		1881	1945	
Hermann Schmitz		1881	1960	
Leo Schubert		1885	1968	
Walter Schultze		1894	1979	
Franz Seldte		1882	1947	
Martin Spahn		1875	1945	
Heinrich Walkenhorst		1906	1972	Replaced Wilhelm Kube, 8 November 1943

=== Constituency 1 (East Prussia) ===
East Prussia was allocated 24 seats.

Name	Image	Birth	Death	Notes
Artur Axmann		1913	1996	Replaced Georg Usadel, 6 October 1941
Erich Behrendt		1904	1941	Died, 27 December 1941
Hermann Bethke		1900	1940	Replaced Georg von Walthausen, 15 October 1938; died, 14 January 1940
Willi Boeckmann		1910	1943	Died, 28 July 1943
Erich Boetel		1904	1940	Died, 22 May 1940
Wilhelm Dame		1895	1966	Replaced Erich Behrendt, 31 March 1942
Paul Dargel		1903	unknown	
Oskar Dobat		1914	1973	Replaced Willi Boeckmann, 17 November 1943
Ernst Duschön		1904	1981	
Erich Fuchs		1894	1945	Died, 9 April 1945
Ferdinand Grossherr		1898	1945	Died, 9 April 1945
Erich Koch		1896	1986	
Karl-Siegmund Litzmann		1893	1945	
Waldemar Magunia		1902	1974	
Georg Mappes		1900	1984	Replaced Erich Boetel, 21 November 1940
Erwin Nötzelmann		1907	1981	
Ewald Oppermann		1896	1965	
Hermann Paltinat		1905	1974	
Joachim Paltzo		1912	1944	Replaced Hermann Bethke, 9 February 1940; died, 19 January 1944
Ernst Penner		1883	1940	Died, 26 November 1940
Eberhard Ponndorf		1887	1980	
Erich Post		1900	1945	Replaced Ernst Penner, 12 March 1941; died 5 April 1945
Alfred Preuss		1887	1947	
Wilhelm Rediess		1900	1945	Died, 8 May 1945
Erwin Rösener		1902	1946	
Otto Schmidtke		1902	unknown	Replaced Nikolaus Wehner, 23 January 1942
Heinrich Schoene		1889	1957	
Erich Spickschen		1897	1957	
Jakob Sporrenberg		1902	1952	
Georg Usadel		1900	1941	Died, 4 August 1941
Georg von Walthausen		1895	1978	Resigned, 30 September 1938
Nikolaus Wehner		1901	1942	Died, 19 July 1942

=== Constituency 2 (Berlin West) ===
Berlin West was allocated 25 seats.

Name	Image	Birth	Death	Notes
Karl Bombach		1891	1945	Died, 6 May 1945
Albert Bormann		1902	1989	
Otto Born		1892	1945	Died, 2 May 1945
Otto Braß		1887	1945	
Ralf Brockhausen		1898	1945	Died, 26 April 1945
Johannes Engel		1894	1973	
Hans Fabricius		1891	1945	Died, 28 April 1945
Rolf Fordon		1909	1963	Replaced Wolf-Heinrich Graf von Helldorff, 8 December 1944
Hans von Freyberg		1881	1945	Died, 24 April 1945
Otto Frowein		1899	1945	
Hermann Giesler		1898	1987	Replaced Rüdiger Graf von der Goltz, 4 August 1943
Joseph Goebbels		1897	1945	Died, 1 May 1945
Rüdiger Graf von der Goltz		1894	1976	Resigned, 31 March 1943
Paul Harpe		1902	1983	
Wolf-Heinrich Graf von Helldorff		1896	1944	Expelled, 10 August 1944
Max Henze		1899	1951	
Erich Hilgenfeldt		1897	1945	Died, 25 April 1945
Paul Körner		1893	1957	
Hermann Kriebel		1876	1941	Died, 16 February 1941
Reinhard Neubert		1896	1945	Died, 27 April 1945
Ernst Peikert		1900	1947	Replaced Ernst Graf zu Reventlow, 1 September 1944
Wilhelm Petzold		1898	1945	Died, 2 May 1945
Ernst Graf zu Reventlow		1869	1943	Died, 21 November 1943
Robert Schormann		1906	1962	
Walter Schuhmann		1898	1956	
Alfred Spangenberg		1897	1947	
Albert Speer		1905	1981	Replaced Hermann Kriebel, 25 August 1941
Alexander Freiherr von Wangenheim		1872	1959	
Wilhelm Weiss		1892	1950	

=== Constituency 3 (Berlin East) ===
Berlin East was allocated 27 seats.

Name	Image	Birth	Death	Notes
Erich Akt		1898	unknown	
Kurt Blome		1894	1969	Replaced Gerhard Wagner, 22 April 1939
Wilhelm Brückner		1884	1954	
Kurt Daluege		1897	1946	
Otto Engelbrecht		1896	1970	Replaced Walther Freiherr von Lindenfels, 9 December 1938
Alfred Ernst		1895	1953	
Hugo Fischer		1902	1976	
Waldemar Geyer		1882	1947	
Artur Görlitzer		1893	1945	Died, 25 April 1945
Karl Hanke		1903	1945	
Hans Hinkel		1901	1960	
Heinrich Hunke		1902	2000	
Dietrich von Jagow		1892	1945	Died, 26 April 1945
Károly Kampmann		1902	1945	Died, 4 May 1945
Jakob Kessel		1881	1965	Replaced Paul Moder, 11 September 1942
Moritz Kraut		1905	1941	Died, 29 December 1941
Hans Krebs		1888	1947	
Walther Freiherr von Lindenfels		1878	1938	Died, 6 December 1938
Kurt Mende		1907	1944	Replaced Moritz Kraut, 6 March 1942; died, 16 July 1944
Paul Moder		1896	1942	Died, 8 February 1942
Walter Ruppin		1885	1945	Died, 3 May 1945
Gerhard Schach		1906	1945	Died, 2 May 1945
Erich Schüler		1905	1987	
Paul Skoda		1901	1945	Missing, 20 April 1945
Walter Stang		1895	1945	Died, 14 April 1945
Werner Wächter		1902	1946	
Gerhard Wagner		1888	1939	Died, 25 March 1939
Kurt Wege		1891	1947	
Fritz Wiedemann		1891	1970	
Karl Wollenberg		1903	1958	
Martin Wülfing		1899	1986	

=== Constituency 4 (Potsdam) ===
Potsdam was allocated 18 seats.

Name	Image	Birth	Death	Notes
Wilhelm Decker		1899	1945	Died, 1 May 1945
Hermann Göring		1893	1946	
Richard Kackstein		1903	1966	
Otto Kannengiesser		1893	1958	
Adolf Katz		1899	1980	
Hermann Kretzschmann		1886	1964	
Walter Kühle		1888	1972	
Willi Luckner		1896	1975	
August Wilhelm Prinz von Preussen		1887	1949	
Theodor Adrian von Renteln		1897	1960	
Joachim von Ribbentrop		1893	1946	
Willi Ruckdeschel		1900	1974	
Karl Schultz		1902	1977	
Helmut Stellrecht		1898	1987	
Fritz Tittmann		1898	1945	Died, 25 April 1945
Paul Wegener		1908	1993	
Martin Wendt		1886	1947	
Heinz Wohlleben		1905	1972	

=== Constituency 5 (Frankfurt an der Oder) ===
Frankfurt an der Oder was allocated 18 seats.

Name	Image	Birth	Death	Notes
Martin Bormann		1900	1945	Died, 2 May 1945
Reinhard Bredow		1872	1945	
Oluf Christensen		1904	1957	Replaced Arno Manthey, 29 November 1941
Sepp Dietrich		1892	1966	
Hans Grüneberg		1899	1991	
Wolfgang Kraneck		1900	1943	Died, 30 December 1943
Erich Krüger		1894	1945	
Friedrich-Wilhelm Krüger		1894	1945	
Werner Kuhnt		1911	2000	
Richard Kunze		1872	1945	
Theodor Leonhardt		1905	1975	Replaced Wolfgang Kraneck, 26 April 1944
Arno Manthey		1888	1941	Died, 12 September 1941
Michael Münster		1901	1986	
Emil Popp		1897	1955	
Hans Richter		1905	1962	
Erich Scheibner		1889	1968	
Karl Scholze		1902	1986	
Hartmut Stegemann		1908	1987	
Emil Stürtz		1892	1945	Missing, 21 April 1945
Wilhelm Wigand		1895	1945	Died, 22 April 1945

=== Constituency 6 (Pomerania) ===
Pomerania was allocated 20 seats.

Name	Image	Birth	Death	Notes
Heinrich Bennecke		1902	1972	
Gottfried Graf von Bismarck-Schönhausen		1901	1949	
Willi Bloedorn		1887	1946	
Walther von Corswant		1886	1942	Died, 12 December 1942
Otto Gohdes		1896	1945	Died, 5 March 1945
Konstantin Hierl		1875	1955	
Johannes Künzel		1899	1978	
Kurt Lüdtke		1898	1991	
Kurt Martius		1903	1970	
Emil Mazuw		1900	1987	
Kuno Popp		1893	1973	
Heinrich Sauer		1905	1966	
Baldur von Schirach		1907	1974	
August Schirmer		1905	1948	
Heinrich Schnee		1871	1949	
Siegfried Schug		1898	1961	
Robert Schulz		1900	1974	
Franz Schwede-Coburg		1888	1960	
Paul Simon		1908	1947	
Rudolf Weiss		1889	1945	Died, 22 February 1945

=== Constituency 7 (Breslau) ===
Breslau was allocated 20 seats.

Name	Image	Birth	Death	Notes
Günther Arndt		1894	1975	
Erich von dem Bach-Zelewski		1899	1972	
Fritz Bracht		1899	1945	
Axel von Freytagh-Loringhoven		1878	1942	Died, 28 October 1942
Walter Gottschalk		1893	1952	
Wilhelm von Grolman		1894	1985	
Otto Herzog		1900	1945	Died, 6 May 1945
Albert Hoffmann		1907	1972	Replaced Hans Huebenett, 3 June 1941
Hans Huebenett		1896	1940	Died, 28 November 1940
Otto Jaeschke		1890	1957	Replaced Johannes von Reibnitz, 19 July 1939
Ernst Jenke		1883	1950	
Viktor Lutze		1890	1943	
Fritz Marx		1900	1985	
Julius Merz		1903	unknown	
Helmut Möckel		1909	1945	Replaced Axel von Freytagh-Loringhoven, 28 November 1942; died, 15 February 1945
Karl Peschke		1882	1943	
Johannes von Reibnitz		1882	1939	Died, 25 June 1939
Heinrich-Christian Schäfer-Hansen		1901	1977	
Albrecht Schmelt		1899	1945	
Hermann Schneider		1872	1953	
Josef Schönwälder		1897	1972	
Richard Türk		1903	1984	
Udo von Woyrsch		1895	1983	

=== Constituency 8 (Liegnitz) ===
Liegnitz was allocated 13 seats.

Name	Image	Birth	Death	Notes
Karl Brückner		1904	1945	Died, 3 April 1945
Emil Engler		1895	unknown	
Heinrich-Georg Graf Finck von Finckenstein		1894	1984	
Hans Frank		1900	1946	
Paul Franke		1892	1961	
Karl Gerland		1905	1945	Died, 21 April 1945
Wilhelm Heerde		1898	1991	
Franz-Werner Jaenke		1905	1943	Died, 25 January 1943
Konrad Jenzen		1882	1975	
Rudolf Klieber		1900	1980	
Alfred Proksch		1891	1981	
Alwin Uber		1884	unknown	
Max Wockatz		1898	1947	

=== Constituency 9 (Oppeln) ===
Oppeln was allocated 14 seats.

Name	Image	Birth	Death	Notes
Paul Binus		1901	1981	
Max Fillusch		1896	1965	
Walter Gross		1904	1945	Died, 25 April 1945
Walter Hamfler		1907	1940	Died, 22 June 1940
Alfred Hawellek		1905	1981	
Hans von Helms		1899	1980	
Heinrich Himmler		1900	1945	
Alfred Jonas		1903	1959	
Lorenz Loewer		1900	1992	
Bruno Müller-Reinert		1897	1954	Replaced Walter Hamfler, 6 August 1940
Ernst Mutz		1900	unknown	
Richard Preiß		1902	unknown	
Erwin Schramm		1887	1956	
Johannes Schweter		1903	1985	
Wilhelm Werner		1888	1945	

=== Constituency 10 (Magdeburg) ===
Magdeburg was allocated 19 seats.

Name	Image	Birth	Death	Notes
Georg Ay		1900	1997	
Karl Fiedler		1897	1945	
Alfred Freyberg		1892	1945	Died, 18 April 1945
Walter Granzow		1887	1952	Resigned, 31 March 1943
Udo Grosse		1896	1946	
Fritz Härtl		1892	1974	
Karl Janowsky		1903	1974	Resigned, 12 January 1943
Rudolf Jordan		1902	1988	
Adolf Kob		1885	1945	
Rudolf Krause		1894	1971	
Hans Kühtz		1894	unknown	
Otto Lehmann		1892	1973	
Rudolf Michaelis		1902	1945	Died, 22 January 1945
Hermann Müller		1900	1970	
Christian Opdenhoff		1902	1975	
Hermann Ried		1895	1979	Replaced Karl Janowsky, 22 February 1943
Alexander Schrader		1887	1956	
Rudolf Trautmann		1908	1944	Replaced Walter Granzow, 13 June 1943; died, 18 July 1944
Wilhelm Trippler		1897	1974	
Hans von Tschammer und Osten		1887	1943	Died, 25 March 1943
Curt von Ulrich		1876	1946	

=== Constituency 11 (Merseburg) ===
Merseburg was allocated 16 seats.

Name	Image	Birth	Death	Notes
Heinrich Bachmann		1903	1945	
Bruno Czarnowski		1902	1988	
Joachim Albrecht Eggeling		1884	1945	Died, 15 April 1945
Richard Fiedler		1908	1974	
August Hallermann		1896	1966	
Max Jüttner		1888	1963	
Curt Loeffelholz von Colberg		1874	1945	Replaced Franz Stöhr, 19 November 1938; died, 1 April 1945
Richard Reckewerth		1897	1970	
Paul Schultze-Naumburg		1869	1949	
Karl Simon		1885	1961	
Franz Stöhr		1879	1938	Died, 13 November 1938
Georg Tesche		1901	1989	
Fritz Tiebel		1889	1945	
Friedrich Uebelhoer		1893	1950	
Hans Weinreich		1896	1963	
Hans Wolkersdörfer		1893	1966	
Joachim Wünning		1898	1944	Died, 22 September 1944

=== Constituency 12 (Thuringia) ===
Thuringia was allocated 26 seats.

Name	Image	Birth	Death	Notes
Franz Barth		1886	1951	
Bruno Biedermann		1904	1953	Replaced Herbert Haselwander, 4 July 1940
Wilhelm Busch		1892	1968	
Alfred Eckart		1901	1940	Died, 14 June 1940
Ernst Frenzel		1904	1978	
Wilhelm Frick		1877	1946	
Martin Groß		1901	1945	
Kurt Günther		1896	1947	
Herbert Haselwander		1910	1940	Died, 21 May 1940
Paul Hennicke		1883	1967	
Willy Marschler		1893	1952	
Franz Metzner		1895	1970	
Walter Ortlepp		1900	1971	
Paul Papenbroock		1894	1945	
Fritz Paschold		1888	1972	
Rudi Peuckert		1908	1946	
Karl Pflomm		1886	1945	Died, 16 April 1945
Eugen Plorin		1901	1943	Died, 19 November 1943
Otto Recknagel		1897	1983	
Karl Reinhardt		1905	1968	
Constantin Rembe		1868	1958	
Fritz Sauckel		1894	1946	
Karl Schmückle		1895	1970	
Heinrich Siekmeier		1903	1984	
Heinz Späing		1893	1946	
Friedrich Triebel		1888	1960	
Oskar Trübenbach		1900	1992	
Paul Vollrath		1899	1965	Replaced Alfred Eckart, 30 July 1940

=== Constituency 13 (Schleswig-Holstein) ===
Schleswig-Holstein was allocated 16 seats.

Name	Image	Birth	Death	Notes
Emil Bannemann		1902	1957	Replaced Joachim Meyer-Quade, 9 December 1939
Hans Beeck		1896	1983	
Peter Börnsen		1896	1986	
Erich Friedrich		1901	1971	
Hans Gewecke		1906	1991	
Hans Kummerfeldt		1887	1963	
Hinrich Lohse		1896	1964	
Martin Matthiessen		1901	1990	
Joachim Meyer-Quade		1897	1939	Died, 12 September 1939
Georg Rau		1892	1964	
Ferdinand Schramm		1889	1964	
Walther Schröder		1902	1973	
Wilhelm Sieh		1892	1970	
Werner Stiehr		1905	1982	
Wilhelm Struve		1901	1982	
Heinrich von Sybel		1885	1969	
Heinrich Wiese		1886	2000	

=== Constituency 14 (Weser-Ems) ===
Weser-Ems was allocated 17 seats.

Name	Image	Birth	Death	Notes
Heinrich Bohnens		1891	1952	
Bruno Dieckelmann		1897	1967	
Erich Drescher		1894	1956	
Lenhard Everwien		1897	1971	Replaced Lühr Hogrefe, 5 October 1942
Paul Giesler		1895	1945	Died, 8 May 1945
Jacques Groeneveld		1892	1983	
Lühr Hogrefe		1900	1942	Died, 13 February 1942
Georg Joel		1898	1981	
Wilhelm Koppe		1886	1975	
Otto von Kursell		1884	1967	
Fritz zur Loye		1888	1981	
Curt Ludwig		1902	1989	
Gustav Nietfeld-Beckmann		1896	1961	
Victor von Podbielski		1892	1945	Replaced Carl Röver, 5 August 1942
Carl Röver		1889	1942	Died, 15 May 1942
Josef Ständer		1894	1976	
Kurt Thiele		1896	1969	
Carl Voß		1897	1969	
Fritz Wehmeier		1897	1945	Died, 4 April 1945

=== Constituency 15 (East Hanover) ===
East Hanover was allocated 11 seats.

Name	Image	Birth	Death	Notes
Paul Brusch		1884	unknown	
Adolf Heincke		1901	1986	
Walther Heitmüller		1900	1945	Replaced Horst Raecke, 19 November 1941
Adalbert Herwig		1901	1961	
Paul Hocheisen		1870	1944	Died, 22 December 1944
Friedrich Jeckeln		1895	1946	
Friedrich-Wilhelm Lütt		1902	1973	
Heinrich Peper		1902	1984	
Horst Raecke		1906	1941	Died, 18 September 1941
Otto Telschow		1876	1945	
Curt Wiebel		1895	1973	
Hermann Zapf		1886	1957	

=== Constituency 16 (South Hanover–Braunschweig) ===
South Hanover–Braunschweig was allocated 23 seats.

Name	Image	Birth	Death	Notes
Arthur Böckenhauer		1899	1953	
Reinhard Fäthe		1902	1978	
Berthold Karwahne		1887	1957	
Hanns Kerrl		1887	1941	Died, 14 December 1941
Dietrich Klagges		1891	1971	
August Knop		1903	1994	Replaced Hanns Kerrl, 26 January 1942
Felix Kopprasch		1891	1946	
Heinrich von Kozierowski		1889	1967	
Werner Kropp		1899	1946	
Hartmann Lauterbacher		1909	1988	
Karl Müller		1879	1944	Died, 21 November 1944
Paul-Friedrich Nebelung		1900	1990	
Hans Petersen		1885	1963	Replaced Franz Pfeffer von Salomon, 6 June 1942
Franz Pfeffer von Salomon		1888	1968	Expelled, 27 November 1941
Hartwig von Rheden		1885	1957	
Bernhard Rust		1883	1945	Died, 8 May 1945
Kurt Schmalz		1906	1964	
Adolf Schmidt-Bodenstedt		1904	1981	
Joseph Seydel		1887	1945	Died, 10 April 1945
Heinrich Soest		1897	1962	
Heinz Spangemacher		1885	1958	
Georg Wagener		1898	1985	
Otto Wilkens		1907	1999	
Werner Willikens		1893	1961	
Ludwig Winter		1894	1956	

=== Constituency 17 (Westphalia North) ===
Westphalia North was allocated 27 seats.

Name	Image	Birth	Death	Notes
Herbert Barthel		1895	1945	
Karl Dreier		1898	1974	
Paul Faßbach		1897	1945	Died, 23 April 1945
Curt Fischer		1901	1945	
Paul Franke		1892	1961	
Heinrich Göckenjan		1900	1986	
Erich Hartmann		1896	1976	
Franz Hayler		1900	1972	Replaced Fritz Springorum, 11 September 1942
Karl Heidemann		1895	1975	
August Heißmeyer		1897	1979	
Rolf von Humann		1885	1961	
Fritz Emil Irrgang		1890	1951	
Karl Jackstien		1899	1943	Died, 29 September 1943
Bernd Freiherr von Kanne		1884	1967	
Walter Knop		1906	1991	
Albert Kost		1897	1947	
Max-Albert Lorenz		1886	1976	Replaced Otto Schramme, 26 August 1941
Alfred Meyer		1891	1945	Died, 11 April 1945
August Mietz		1898	1989	Replaced Fritz Schmidt, 23 August 1943
Hans-Joachim Riecke		1899	1986	
Paul Schmidt		1901	1977	
Fritz Schmidt		1903	1943	Died, 20 June 1943
Otto Schramme		1899	1941	Died, 25 May 1941
Ferdinand Schürmann		1896	1966	
Fritz Springorum		1886	1942	Died, 16 April 1942
Peter Stangier		1898	1962	
Walter Steinecke		1888	1975	
Hans Ummen		1894	1982	
Hans Vogel		1887	1955	
Adolf Wedderwille		1895	1947	

=== Constituency 18 (Westphalia South) ===
Westphalia South was allocated 28 seats.

Name	Image	Birth	Death	Notes
Viktor Bauer		1885	1977	Replaced Willy Damson, 18 April 1944
Franz Bauer		1894	1966	
Gustav Bertram		1883	1963	Replaced Josef Wagner, 12 March 1942
Franz Bielefeld		1907	1989	Replaced August Knickmann, 3 November 1941
Walter Borlinghaus		1906	1945	Replaced Ernst Riemenschneider, 18 February 1944;died, 14 April 1945
Philipp Bouhler		1899	1945	
Willy Damson		1894	1944	Expelled, 22 March 1944
Hans-Gerhard Dedeke		1904	1975	
Hein Diehl		1896	1964	
Wilhelm Fischer		1906	1965	
Friedrich Geißelbrecht		1895	1985	
Wilhelm Habbes		1896	1948	
Walter Heringlake		1901	1969	Resigned, November 1941
Rudolf Jung		1882	1945	
Karl Jung		1883	1965	
Heinrich August Knickmann		1894	1941	Died, 5 August 1941
Karl Krichbaum		1899	1971	
Franz Land		1896	1974	
Richard Manderbach		1889	1962	
Wilhelm Meinberg		1898	1973	Resigned, 31 March 1943
Albert Meister		1895	1942	Died, 20 August 1942
Erhard Müller		1906	1969	
Ernst Nassauer		1901	1944	Replaced Walter Heringlake, 29 November 1942; died 11 March 1944
Paul Nieder-Westermann		1892	1957	
Franz Quadflieg		1900	1957	
Ernst Riemenschneider		1900	1960	Resigned, 20 October 1943
Carl Ludwig Schleich		1899	1944	Died, 6 June 1944
Fritz Schleßmann		1900	1964	
Kurt Stahl		1901	1975	Replaced Albert Meister, 20 October 1942
Ernst Stein		1906	1943	Died, 17 January 1943
Hans Strube		1910	1945	Replaced Wilhelm Meinberg, 5 August 1943; died, 1 May 1945
Heinrich Teipel		1885	1945	Died, 11 April 1945
Heinrich Vetter		1890	1969	
Albert Vögler		1877	1945	Died, 13 April 1945
Josef Wagner		1899	1945	Expelled, 26 November 1941

=== Constituency 19 (Hesse-Nassau) ===
Hesse-Nassau was allocated 28 seats.

Name	Image	Birth	Death	Notes
Willy Becker		1890	1945	
Adolf Beckerle		1902	1976	
Rudolf Braun		1889	1975	
Richard Büchner		1897	1941	Died, 13 January 1941
Hans Burkhardt		1891	1948	
Hans Dippel		1893	1945	Died, 11 April 1945
Helmuth Friedrichs		1899	1945	
Fritz Fuchs		1894	1977	Replaced Adalbert Gimbel, 28 January 1943
Adalbert Gimbel		1898	1973	Resigned, 27 November 1942
Theodor Habicht		1898	1944	Died, 31 January 1944
Richard Hildebrandt		1897	1952	
Hans Krawielitzki		1900	1992	
Kurt Kühme		1885	1944	Replaced Werner Schwarz, 24 March 1943; died, 25 December 1944
Karl Linder		1900	1979	
Johannes Lommel		1875	1939	Died, 27 October 1939
Carl Lüer		1897	1969	
Albert Miller		1900	1966	Replaced Richard Büchner, 3 February 1941
Hermann Neef		1904	1950	
Hanns Oberlindober		1896	1949	
Felix Piékarski		1890	1965	Appointed 5 August 1943
Johannes Puth		1900	1957	
Heinrich Reinhardt		1894	1950	Replaced Fritz Schmidt, 12 November 1942
Wilhelm Georg Schmidt		1900	1938	Died, 29 August 1938
Fritz Schmidt		1899	1942	Died, 2 July 1942
Werner Schwarz		1902	1942	Died, 10 May 1942
Otto Schwebel		1903	1976	Replaced Johannes Lommel, 10 November 1939
Walther Seidler		1897	1952	
Max Solbrig		1889	1959	Replaced Wilhelm Georg Schmidt, 10 September 1938
Jakob Sprenger		1884	1945	Died, 7 May 1945
Willi Stöhr		1903	unknown	
Wilhelm Thiele		1897	1990	
Karl Vetter		1895	1964	
Fritz Vielstich		1895	1965	
Karl Weinrich		1887	1973	
Franz Hermann Woweries		1908	1948	

=== Constituency 20 (Cologne–Aachen) ===
Cologne–Aachen was allocated 26 seats.

Name	Image	Birth	Death	Notes
Walter Aldinger		1904	1945	
Franz Binz		1896	1965	
Werner Daitz		1884	1945	Died, 5 May 1945
Carl Ludwig Doerr		1887	1954	
Kuno von Eltz-Rübenach		1904	1945	Died, 30 January 1945
Josef Grohé		1902	1987	
Heinrich Haake		1892	1945	
Kurt Hintze		1901	1944	Died, 13 November 1944
Walter Hoevel		1894	1956	
Heinz Hohoff		1910	1943	Died, 30 January 1943
Paul Holthoff		1897	1967	
Curt Horst		1902	1990	
Adolf Jäger		1906	1996	
Josef Krämer		1904	1980	Replaced Karl Georg Schmidt, 9 December 1940
Heinz Lampe		1896	1951	
Arthur Lehmann		1885	1945	
Robert Ley		1890	1945	
Fritz Marrenbach		1896	1967	
Richard Ohling		1908	1985	
Hermann Reschny		1898	1971	
Richard Schaller		1903	1972	
Gustav Adolf Scheel		1907	1979	
Rudolf Schmeer		1905	1966	
Karl Georg Schmidt		1904	1940	Died, 26 November 1940
Ludwig Schneider		1902	1944	Died, 15 October 1944
Martin Schwaebe		1911	1985	Replaced Konrad Volm, 5 August 1943
Konrad Volm		1897	1958	Resigned, 22 May 1943
Toni Winkelnkemper		1905	1968	

=== Constituency 21 (Koblenz–Trier) ===
Koblenz–Trier was allocated 13 seats.

Name	Image	Birth	Death	Notes
Josef Ackermann		1905	1997	Replaced Detfef Dern, 9 December 1941
Robert Claussen		1909	1941	Died, 3 August 1941
Detlef Dern		1905	1941	Died, 15 August 1941
Otto Dreyer		1903	1986	
Arthur Etterich		1894	1960	
Günther Gräntz		1905	1945	Died, 30 April 1945
Rolf Karbach		1908	1992	
Albert Müller		1895	1945	
Fritz Reckmann		1907	1984	
Ernst Schmitt		1901	1972	
Peter Schmitt		1901	1985	
Gustav Simon		1900	1945	
Albert Urmes		1910	1985	Replaced Robert Claussen, 29 September 1941
Paul Wipper		1906	1992	
Carl Zenner		1899	1969	

=== Constituency 22 (Düsseldorf East) ===
Düsseldorf East was allocated 25 seats.

Name	Image	Birth	Death	Notes
Gottlob Berger		1896	1975	Replaced Oswald Pohl, 5 August 1943
Peter Berns		1907	1941	Died, 3 July 1941
Franz Bock		1905	1974	
Erich Börger		1899	1975	Replaced Peter Berns, 25 August 1941
Wilhelm Börger		1896	1962	
Paul Dahm		1904	1974	Replaced Fritz Weitzel, 1 August 1940
Erich Diestelkamp		1900	1983	
Oskar Druschel		1904	1944	Died, 28 June 1944
Rudolf Feick		1900	1945	Expelled, 22 April 1944
Friedrich Karl Florian		1894	1975	
Alfred Frauenfeld		1898	1977	
Hans Hagemeyer		1899	1993	Replaced Gotthard Urban, 29 September 1941
Reinhard Heydrich		1904	1942	Died, 4 June 1942
Heinrich Hoffmann		1885	1957	Replaced Fritz Thyssen, 13 January 1940
Heinrich Ilbertz		1891	1974	
Heinz-Hugo John		1904	1944	Died, 9 June 1944
Max Kolb		1889	1970	
Karl Megerle		1894	1972	
Heinrich Niem		1906	1944	Died, 20 August 1944
Theodor Oppermann		1889	1945	Died, 6 May 1945
Carl Overhues		1886	1972	Replaced Ernst Schwarz, 7 July 1941
Heinrich Pahlings		1904	1947	
Oswald Pohl		1892	1951	Replaced Reinhard Heydrich, 10 July 1942; resigned, 31 March 1943
Hermann Schroer		1900	1958	
Wilhelm Schumann		1899	unknown	
Karl Adolf Schwabe		1909	1990	Replaced Rudolf Feick, 22 July 1944
Ernst Schwarz		1904	1941	Died, 5 April 1941
Heinrich Simon		1910	1979	
Alfred Straßweg		1902	1997	
Fritz Thyssen		1873	1951	Expelled, 1 December 1939
Gotthard Urban		1905	1941	Died, 27 July 1941
Karl Walter		1901	1957	
Fritz Weitzel		1904	1940	Died, 19 June 1940

=== Constituency 23 (Düsseldorf West) ===
Düsseldorf West was allocated 21 seats.

Name	Image	Birth	Death	Notes
Wilhelm Beyer		1885	1945	Died, 11 April 1945
Karl Bubenzer		1900	1975	Replaced Heinrich Unger, 25 April 1939
Karl Camphausen		1896	1962	
Otto Dahlem		1891	1980	
Arnold Fischer		1898	1972	
Ludwig Fischer		1905	1947	
Friedrich Grimm		1888	1959	
Karl Gutenberger		1905	1961	
Paul Hoffmann		1879	1949	
Peter Hütgens		1891	1945	Died, 4 May 1945
Fritz Johlitz		1893	1974	
Wilhelm Kattwinkel		1883	1953	
Manfred Freiherr von Killinger		1886	1944	Died, 2 September 1944
Wilhelm Loch		1892	1969	
Friedrich Peppmüller		1892	1972	
Alfred Rodenbücher		1900	1979	
Emil Schultz		1899	1946	
Josef Terboven		1898	1945	Died, 8 May 1945
Heinrich Unger		1868	1939	Died, 16 April 1939
Josias zu Waldeck und Pyrmont		1896	1967	
Lucian Wysocki		1899	1964	
Karl Zech		1892	1944	Expelled, 11 March 1944

=== Constituency 24 (Upper Bavaria–Swabia) ===
Upper Bavaria–Swabia was allocated 30 seats.

Name	Image	Birth	Death	Notes
Max Amann		1891	1957	
Josef Bauer		1881	1958	
Hans Baumann		1875	1951	
Georg Biederer		1900	1967	
Emil Breitenstein		1899	1971	Replaced Karl Wenzl, 10 December 1942
Franz Buchner		1898	1967	
Hanns Bunge		1898	1966	
Rudolf Buttmann		1885	1947	
Hans Dauser		1877	1969	
Johann Deininger		1896	1973	
Karl von Eberstein		1894	1979	
Franz von Epp		1868	1947	
Hermann Esser		1900	1981	
Karl Fiehler		1895	1969	
Kurt Frey		1902	1945	Died, 19 January 1945
Wilhelm Helfer		1886	1954	
Adolf Hitler		1889	1945	Died, 30 April 1945
Emil Klein		1905	2010	
Joachim von Moltke		1891	1956	Replaced Ludwig Siebert, 28 November 1942
Anton Mündler		1896	1945	Died, 28 April 1945
Otto Nippold		1902	1940	Died, 17 May 1940
Fritz Reinhardt		1895	1969	
Josef Riggauer		1879	1952	
Georg Schädler		1887	1971	
Julius Schaub		1898	1967	
Wilhelm Schwarz		1902	1975	
Franz Xaver Schwarz		1875	1947	
Ludwig Siebert		1874	1942	Died, 1 November 1942
Georg Traeg		1899	1978	
Adolf Wagner		1890	1944	Died, 12 April 1944
Karl Wahl		1882	1981	
Karl Wenzl		1903	1942	Died, 27 May 1942
Wilhelm Wettschureck		1898	1970	Replaced Otto Nippold, 8 August 1940

=== Constituency 25 (Lower Bavaria–Upper Palatinate) ===
Lower Bavaria––Upper Palatinate was allocated 13 seats.

Name	Image	Birth	Death	Notes
Peter Bell		1889	1939	Died, 22 September 1939
Nikolaus Eiden		1901	1956	Replaced Adolf Hühnlein, 20 July 1942
Otto Erbersdobler		1895	1981	
Franz Ganninger		1900	1945	
Hermann Grassl		1896	1969	
Hans Georg Hofmann		1873	1942	Died, 31 January 1942
Adolf Hühnlein		1881	1942	Died, 18 June 1942
Artur Kolb		1895	1945	Died, 22 April 1945
Benno Kuhr		1896	1955	Replaced Peter Bell, 4 October 1939
Max Moosbauer		1892	1968	
Paul Müller		1892	1963	
Ludwig Ruckdeschel		1907	1986	
Hans Schiffmann		1889	1955	
Franz Xaver Schlemmer		1895	1952	
Helmut Sündermann		1911	1972	Replaced Hans Georg Hofmann, 26 February 1942
Fritz Wächtler		1891	1945	Died, 19 April 1945

=== Constituency 26 (Franconia) ===
Franconia was allocated 28 seats.

Name	Image	Birth	Death	Notes
Johann Appler		1892	1978	
Georg Dechant		1893	1978	Replaced Hanns Günther von Obernitz, 26 February 1944
Hans Dotzler		1906	1979	Replaced Karl Götz, 26 February 1942
Albert Forster		1902	1952	Transferred to represent Danzig–West Prussia, 7 July 1940
Richard Gehrig		1897	1978	
Michael Gerstner		1896	1977	Replaced Georg Sperber, 24 April 1941
Karl Götz		1888	1954	Resigned, 17 January 1942
Georg Gradl		1884	1950	Expelled, 28 March 1942
August Greim		1895	1975	
Wilhelm Grimm		1889	1944	Died, 21 July 1944
Rudolf Gugel		1908	1945	Died, 20 January 1945
Georg Haberkern		1899	1945	Replaced Georg Gradl, April 1942
Heinrich Hager		1893	1941	Died, 27 September 1941
Willi Heer		1894	1961	
Otto Hellmuth		1896	1968	
Adolf Hergenröder		1896	1945	
Karl Holz		1895	1945	Died, 20 April 1945
Heinrich Horlbeck		1897	1980	Replaced Heinrich Hager, 29 November 1941; resigned, 4 February 1942; replaced Richard Wagenbauer, 14 January 1943
Ernst Ittameier		1893	1948	
Xaver Knaup		1893	1950	
Hanns König		1904	1939	Died, 5 February 1939
Willy Liebel		1897	1945	Died, 20 April 1945
Karl Minnameyer		1891	1973	
Johann Adam Mohr		1896	1982	
Hanns Günther von Obernitz		1899	1944	Replaced Hanns König, 7 February 1939; died 14 January 1944
Ludwig Pösl		1903	1945	Died, 12 April 1945
Josef Alois Reinhart		1899	1977	
Karl Schlumprecht		1901	1970	
Ernst-Heinrich Schmauser		1890	1945	Died, 10 February 1945
Fritz Schuberth		1897	1977	
Georg Sperber		1897	1943	Expelled, 23 April 1941; died, November 1943
Julius Streicher		1885	1946	
Richard Wagenbauer		1896	1942	Replaced Heinrich Horlbeck, 6 February 1942; died, 20 October 1942
Philipp Wurzbacher		1898	1984	
Lorenz Zahneisen		1897	1950	
Hans Zimmermann		1906	1984	Replaced Albert Forster, 7 July 1940

=== Constituency 27 (Palatinate–Saar) ===
Palatinate–Saar was allocated 19 seats.

Name	Image	Birth	Death	Notes
Wilhelm Bösing		1902	1949	
Josef Bürckel		1895	1944	Died, 28 September 1944
Hans Dietrich		1898	1945	Died, 11 April 1945
Ernst Dürrfeld		1898	1945	Died, 23 April 1945
Herbert Fust		1899	1974	
Fritz Heß		1879	1938	Died, 8 June 1938
Peter Kiefer		1884	1945	
Karl Kleemann		1904	1969	
Ernst Ludwig Leyser		1896	1973	
Ludwig Liebel		1887	1962	
Richard Mann		1893	1960	Replaced Fritz Heß, 13 June 1938
Hieronymus Merkle		1887	1970	Replaced Julius Weber, 6 November 1942
Heinrich Nietmann		1901	1961	
Rudolf Röhrig		1903	1970	
Hans Saupert		1897	1966	
Willy Schmelcher		1894	1974	
Franz Schubert		1905	1992	
Fritz Schwitzgebel		1888	1957	
Nikolaus Selzner		1899	1944	Died, 20 June 1944
Julius Weber		1904	1942	Died, 15 January 1942
Wilhelm Welter		1898	1966	

=== Constituency 28 (Dresden–Bautzen) ===
Dresden–Bautzen was allocated 21 seats.

Name	Image	Birth	Death	Notes
Herbert Albrecht		1900	1945	
Heinrich Bär		1905	1977	
Theo Berkelmann		1894	1943	Died, 28 December 1943
Helmut Böhme		1902	1945	Died 6 May 1945
Walter Burghardt		1885	1938	Died, 17 August 1938
Walther Darré		1895	1953	
Hermann Gerischer		1901	1990	
Arthur Hugo Göpfert		1902	1986	
Curt Haase		1897	unknown	
Wilhelm Heuber		1898	1957	
Karl Horn		1898	1977	
Hellmut Körner		1904	1966	
Georg Müller		1892	unknown	
Walter Neul		1899	1971	
Georg Poxleitner		1898	1964	Replaced Walter Burghardt, September 1938
Willy Reichelt		1880	1946	
Hans Reiter		1901	1973	
Wilhelm Schepmann		1894	1970	
Paul Unterstab		1895	1944	Died, 25 August 1944
Hellmut Walter		1908	1991	
Christian Weber		1883	1945	
Ernst Wettengel		1903	1981	

=== Constituency 29 (Leipzig) ===
Leipzig was allocated 15 seats.

Name	Image	Birth	Death	Notes
Walter Buch		1883	1949	
Otto Dietrich		1897	1952	
Hermann Groine		1897	1941	Died, 31 July 1941
Karl Martin		1893	1974	
Emil Maurice		1897	1972	
Otto Naumann		1895	1965	
Richard Owe		1889	1970	
Paul Arthur Rabe		1903	1976	
Paul Schaaf		1888	1979	
Hans Seifert		1889	1948	
Karl Sieber		1888	1946	
Fritz Stollberg		1888	1948	
Werner Studentkowski		1903	1951	
Werner Vogelsang		1895	1947	
Otto Zimmermann		1897	1973	Replaced Hermann Groine, 11 September 1941
Oskar Zschake-Papsdorf		1902	1944	Missing, 23 July 1944

=== Constituency 30 (Chemnitz–Zwickau) ===
Chemnitz–Zwickau was allocated 21 seats.

Name	Image	Birth	Death	Notes
Eduard Altenburg		1894	1943	Died, 29 December 1943
Robert Bauer		1898	1965	
Johannes Eberhard Bochmann		1899	1977	Replaced Franz Pillmayer, 10 November 1939
Paul Drechsel		1888	1953	
Theodor Eicke		1892	1943	Died, 26 February 1943
Hans Georg Freund		1905	1942	Missing, January 1942
Karl Fritsch		1901	1944	Died, 22 April 1944
Willy Grothe		1886	1959	
Alfons Hitzler		1897	1945	
Erich Hofmann		1901	1984	
Martin Jordan		1897	1945	
Erich Kunz		1897	1939	Died, 30 April 1939
Georg Lenk		1888	1946	
Martin Mutschmann		1879	1947	
Walter Oberhaidacher		1896	1945	Died, 30 April 1945
Hellmut Peitsch		1906	1950	
Franz Pillmayer		1897	1939	Died, 26 October 1939
Fritz Preißler		1904	1945	Died, 22 April 1945
Gerhard Rühle		1905	1949	
Heinrich Salzmann		1891	1952	Replaced Erich Kunz, 16 May 1939
Walter Schmitt		1879	1945	Replaced Theodor Eicke, 8 May 1943
Heinrich Strang		1896	1956	
Carl Strobel		1895	1945	Replaced Kurt Weisflog, 20 October 1942
Martin Weis		1907	1970	
Kurt Weisflog		1906	1942	Died, 7 July 1942

=== Constituency 31 (Württemberg) ===
Württemberg was allocated 31 seats.

Name	Image	Birth	Death	Notes
Georg Altner		1901	1945	Died, 12 April 1945
Ludolf von Alvensleben		1901	1970	
Alfred Arnold		1888	1960	
Philipp Baetzner		1897	1961	
Helmut Baumert		1909	1980	
Wilhelm Bisse		1881	1946	
Ernst Wilhelm Bohle		1903	1960	
Karl Dempel		1897	1967	
Richard Drauz		1894	1946	
Wilhelm Dreher		1892	1969	
Erich Hagenmeyer		1892	1963	Replaced Georg Utz, 1 March 1939
Daniel Hauer		1879	1945	
Ernst Huber		1902	1982	
Kurt Kaul		1890	1944	Died, 25 December 1944
Fritz Kiehn		1885	1980	
Erwin Kraus		1894	1966	
Eugen Maier		1899	1940	Died, 16 January 1940
Josef Malzer		1902	1954	
Adolf Mauer		1899	1978	Replaced Eugen Maier, 20 January 1940
Wilhelm Murr		1988	1945	
Gustav Robert Oexle		1889	1945	Died, 25 April 1945
Alfred Pfaff		1872	1954	
Eugen Graf von Quadt zu Wykradt und Isny		1887	1940	Died, 19 October 1940
Hermann Reischle		1898	1983	Replaced Eugen Graf von Quadt zu Wykradt und Isny, 5 December 1940
Bernhard Ruberg		1897	1945	Died, 12 April 1945
Friedrich Schmidt		1902	1973	
Albert Schüle		1890	1947	
Friedrich Schulz		1897	1965	
Hans Seibold		1904	1974	
Franz Schenk Freiherr von Stauffenberg		1877	1950	
Vinzenz Stehle		1901	1967	
Erich Sundermann		1908	1993	
Georg Utz		1901	1939	Died, 21 February 1939
Anton Vogt		1891	1976	

=== Constituency 32 (Baden) ===
Baden was allocated 26 seats.

Name	Image	Birth	Death	Notes
Joseph Berchtold		1897	1962	
Hugo Bruckmann		1863	1941	Died, 3 September 1941
Leopold Damian		1895	1971	Replaced Willy Ziegler, 28 April 1942
Christoph Diehm		1892	1960	
Fritz Engler-Füßlin		1891	1966	
Albert Hackelsberger		1893	1940	Resigned, December 1938
Ludwig Huber		1889	1946	
Friedhelm Kemper		1906	1990	
Wilhelm Keppler		1882	1960	
Walter Köhler		1897	1989	
Herbert Kraft		1886	1946	
August Kramer		1900	1979	
Hanns Ludin		1905	1947	
Franz Merk		1894	1945	Died, 9 April 1945
Franz Moraller		1903	1986	Replaced Otto Wacker, July 1940
Karl Offermann		1884	1956	
Karl Pflaumer		1896	1971	
Friedrich Plattner		1901	1960	
Hermann Röhn		1902	1946	
Albert Roth		1893	1952	
Reinhold Roth		1900	1985	
Robert Roth		1891	1975	
Adolf Schmid		1905	1979	Replaced Hackelsberger, 12 December 1938
Adolf Schuppel		1895	1946	
Adalbert Ullmer		1896	1966	
Otto Wacker		1900	1940	Died, 14 February 1940
Robert Heinrich Wagner		1895	1946	
Otto Wetzel		1905	1982	
Willy Ziegler		1899	1942	Died, 19 January 1942

=== Constituency 33 (Hesse-Darmstadt) ===
Hesse-Darmstadt was allocated 15 seats.

Name	Image	Birth	Death	Notes
Andreas Bolek		1894	1945	Died, 5 May 1945
Walter Heyse		1902	1980	
Alfred Klostermann		1900	1945	Died, 25 February 1945
Otto Marrenbach		1899	1974	
Ludwig Münchmeyer		1885	1947	
Heinrich Reiner		1892	1946	
Friedrich Ringshausen		1880	1941	Died, 17 February 1941
Heinrich Ritter		1891	1966	
Alfred Rosenberg		1893	1946	
Karl Schilling		1889	1943	Replaced Friedrich Ringshausen, 2 April 1941
Gustav Schmidt		1898	1972	
Wilhelm Schwinn		1897	1967	
Martin Seidel		1898	1945	Died, 2 May 1945
Wilhelm Seipel		1903	1967	
Richard Wagner		1902	1973	
Karl Wolff		1900	1984	

=== Constituency 34 (Hamburg) ===
Hamburg was allocated 20 seats.

Name	Image	Birth	Death	Notes
Georg Ahlemann		1870	1945	Died, 1 May 1945
Hellmuth Becker		1902	1962	
Friedrich Boschmann		1903	1965	
Walter Gloy		1886	1953	
Rudolf Habedank		1893	1969	
Johann Häfker		1885	1948	Replaced Fritz Meyer, 5 July 1943
Harry Henningsen		1895	1944	Died, 8 March 1944
Paul Hinkler		1895	1945	Died, 13 April 1945
Henry Hinz		1904	1986	Replaced Wilhelm Schroeder, 21 September 1944
Siegfried Kasche		1903	1947	
Karl Kaufmann		1900	1969	
Wilhelm Kohlmeyer		1907	1943	Died, 12 February 1943
Werner Lorenz		1891	1974	
Max Otto Luyken		1885	1945	Died, 30 April 1945
Fritz Meyer		1881	1953	Resigned, 15 April 1943
Franz Paul		1911	1985	Replaced Wilhelm Kohlmeyer, 5 August 1943
Carl Penzhorn		1866	1956	
Arnold Petersen		1892	1953	
Hans-Adolf Prützmann		1901	1945	
Arthur Rakobrandt		1878	1948	
Helmut Reinke		1897	1969	
Arno Schickedanz		1892	1945	Died, 12 April 1945
Max Schoppe		1902	1976	Replaced Harry Henningsen, 18 September 1944
Wilhelm Schroeder		1898	1943	Died, 8 July 1943

=== Constituency 35 (Mecklenburg) ===
Mecklenburg was allocated 9 seats.

Name	Image	Birth	Death	Notes
Werner Altendorf		1906	1945	Died 3 May 1945
Kurt Budäus		1908	1963	Replaced Emil Georg von Stauss, 14 December 1943
Roland Freisler		1893	1945	Died, 3 February 1945
Friedrich Hildebrandt		1898	1948	
Gerd von Koerber		1906	1983	
Fritz Montag		1896	1943	Replaced Karl Seeman, 9 February 1943; died, 20 February 1943
Ludwig Oldach		1888	1987	
Friedrich Graf von der Schulenburg		1865	1939	Died, 19 May 1939
Karl Seemann		1886	1943	Died, 18 January 1943
Hans-Eugen Sommer		1901	1952	Replaced Fritz Montag, 1 April 1943
Emil Georg von Stauss		1877	1942	Died, 11 December 1942
Walter Unger		1909	1999	
Alfred Wilke		1902	1993	Replaced Friedrich Graf von der Schulenburg, 31 May 1939

=== Constituency Land Österreich ===
Land Österreich was allocated 73 seats.

Name	Image	Birth	Death	Notes
Karl Ahorner		1889	1949	
Victor Band		1897	1973	
Carl Freiherr von Bardolff		1865	1953	
Kurt von Barisiani		1895	1970	
Hermann Behrends		1907	1948	Replaced Hubert Klausner, March 1939
Hanns Blaschke		1896	1971	
Edmund Brauner		1899	1960	Replaced Eduard Honisch, 29 March 1943
Karl Breitenthaler		1879	1970	
Helmut Breymann		1911	1944	Missing in action, 27 July 1944
Otto Christandl		1901	1961	
Edmund Christoph		1901	1961	
Leonardo Conti		1901	1945	Replaced Josef Leopold, 27 August 1941
Hans Diesenreiter		1909	1978	
Walter Ebner		1911	1992	Replaced Felix Urstöger, 19 January 1943
August Eigruber		1907	1947	
Hans Eisenkolb		1905	1978	
Johann Esel		1900	1987	Resigned, 23 March 1941
Peter Feistritzer		1901	1947	Replaced Karl Paul Gebhardt, February 1942
Hans Fischböck		1895	1967	
Josef Fitzthum		1896	1945	Died, 10 January 1945
Hermann Foppa		1882	1959	
Walter Gasthuber		1905	1966	Replaced Leopold Mitterbauer, 17 November 1943
Karl Paul Gebhardt		1905	1941	Died, 13 September 1941
Edmund Glaise von Horstenau		1882	1946	
Odilo Globocnik		1904	1945	
Leo Gotzmann		1893	1945	
Sepp Hainzl		1888	1960	
Konrad Hammetter		1898	1941	Replaced Johann Esel, 2 April 1941; died, 16 October 1941
Franz Hanke		1892	1980	Resigned, 31 October 1944
Sepp Helfrich		1900	1963	
Hans Hiedler		1898	1941	Died, 16 December 1941
Max Hölzel		1906	1941	Died, 12 December 1941
Franz Hofer		1902	1975	
Eduard Honisch		1910	1953	Expelled, 29 March 1943
Paul Hudl		1894	unknown	
Franz Hueber		1894	1981	
Roman Jäger		1909	1944	Missing in action, 22 September 1944
Hugo Jury		1887	1945	Died, 8 May 1945
Max Kalcher		1911	1982	Expelled, 18 January 1939
Ernst Kaltenbrunner		1903	1946	
Konstantin Kammerhofer		1899	1958	
Ferdinand Kernmaier		1884	1941	Died, 16 April 1941
Hubert Klausner		1892	1939	Died, 12 February 1939
Fritz Knaus		1888	1945	
Karl Kowarik		1907	1987	Replaced Max Hölzel, March 1942
Alfred Krauß		1862	1938	Died, 29 September 1938
Franz Kutschera		1904	1944	Died, 1 February 1944
Franz Langoth		1877	1953	
Karl Lapper		1907	1996	
Josef Leopold		1889	1941	Died, 24 July 1941
Hans Lukesch		1901	1994	
August Edler von Meyszner		1886	1947	
Johann Mikula		1900	1978	
Leopold Mitterbauer		1912	1971	Expelled, 16 August 1943
Franz Peterseil		1907	1991	
Walter Pfrimer		1881	1968	
Michael Pirker		1911	1975	
Anton Plankensteiner		1890	1969	
Tobias Portschy		1905	1996	
Josef Prokop		1898	1945	Replaced Ferdinand Kernmaier, 18 June 1941
Otto Raber		1900	1951	
Friedrich Rainer		1903	1947	
Franz Rappell		1895	1983	
Hanns Albin Rauter		1895	1949	Replaced Alfred Krauß, 1938
Anton Reinthaller		1895	1958	
Hermann Reisinger		1900	1967	Replaced Konrad Hammetter, 20 December 1941
Walter Rentmeister		1894	1964	
Franz Richter		1905	1973	
Ferdinand von Sammern-Frankenegg		1897	1944	Died, 20 September 1944
Karl Scharizer		1901	1956	
Franz Schattenfroh		1898	1974	
Anton Josef Schatz		1902	1968	
Hans Scheriau		1889	1939	Died, 15 June 1939
Franz Schmid		1877	1953	Replaced Hans Scheriau, July 1939
Hans Schmidhofer		1912	1945	
Arthur Seyß-Inquart		1892	1946	
Heinrich Ritter von Srbik		1878	1951	
Theo Albert Stadler		1910	1984	
Karl Straßmayr		1897	1945	Died, 7 May 1945
Christian Straubinger		1902	1983	
Richard Suchenwirth		1896	1965	Replaced Max Kalcher, 21 January 1939
Franz Theissenberger		1903	1988	
Ludwig Uhl		1902	1985	Replaced Hans Hiedler, 15 October 1941
Siegfried Uiberreither		1908	1984	
Felix Urstöger		1910	1941	Died, 15 December 1941
Eugen Werkowitsch		1872	1945	
Anton Wintersteiger		1900	1990	

=== Constituency Sudetenland ===
Sudetenland was allocated 41 seats.

Name	Image	Birth	Death	Notes
Fritz Amreich		1895	1945	Replaced Rudolf Schicketanz, 14 December 1943
Josef Barwig		1909	1942	Died, 26 May 1942
Hubert Birke		1892	1950	
Felix Bornemann		1894	1990	
Willi Brandner		1909	1944	Died, 29 December 1944
Friedrich Bürger		1899	1972	
Herbert David		1900	1985	
Rudolf Dietl		1892	1976	
Richard Donnevert		1896	1970	Replaced Josef Kraus, 19 August 1940
Wilhelm Dreßler		1893	1945	Died, 8 May 1945
Ludwig Eichholz		1903	1964	
Karl Feitenhansl		1891	1951	
Ludwig Frank		1883	1945	
Karl Hermann Frank		1898	1946	
Anton Hausmann		1899	1960	
Wilhelm Heinz		1894	1945	Replaced Josef Barwig, 3 January 1943
Konrad Henlein		1898	1945	
Julius Hönig		1902	1945	
Konstantin Höß		1903	1970	Replaced Gustav Adolf Oberlik, 28 February 1940
Walther Jaroschek		1903	1968	
Adolf Jobst		1900	1974	
Guido Klieber		1898	1959	
Fritz Köllner		1904	1986	
Alfred Kottek		1906	1943	Died, 31 August 1943
Josef Kraus		1903	1940	Expelled, 17 July 1940
Franz Krautzberger		1913	1942	Died, 23 September 1942
Gottfried Krczal		1885	1966	
Anton Kreißl		1895	1945	
Franz Künzel		1900	1986	Resigned, 31 March 1943
Richard Lammel		1899	1951	
Anton Lutz		1908	2002	Replaced Anton Sandner, 23 April 1942
Franz May		1903	1969	
Franz Nitsch		1898	1945	Replaced Wolfgang Richter, 14 December 1943
Gustav Adolf Oberlik		1905	1943	Expelled, 4 January 1940
Ernst Peschka		1900	1970	
Anton Pfrogner		1886	1961	
Günther Prager		1911	1976	Replaced Franz Künzel, 22 January 1944
Hubert Preibsch		1892	1959	
Rudolf Raschka		1907	1948	Expelled, September 1943
Wolfgang Richter		1901	1958	Resigned, 31 March 1943
Alfred Rosche		1884	1947	
Anton Sandner		1906	1942	Died, 13 March 1942
Rudolf Sandner		1905	1983	
Rudolf Schicketanz		1900	1945	Resigned, 31 March 1943
Rudolf Schittenhelm		1897	1945	Replaced Rudolf Raschka, 4 October 1944
Franz Stiebitz		1899	1945	
Karl Viererbl		1903	1945	
Rudolf Wenze		1904	1992	
Georg Wollner		1903	1948	
