= Friedrich Grimm =

German lawyer and politician (1888–1959)

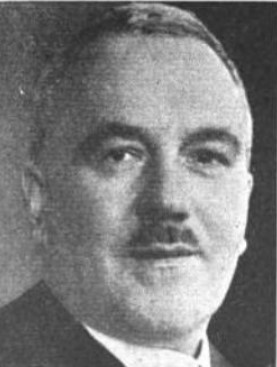
- Grimm in 1938

Consul General
- In office 4 September 1939 – 8 May 1945

Vice-president, German French Society
- In office 25 October 1935 – 8 May 1945

Reichstag Deputy
- In office 12 November 1933 – 8 May 1945

Personal details
- Born: 17 June 1888 Düsseldorf, Rhine Province, Kingdom of Prussia, German Empire
- Died: 16 May 1959 (aged 70) Freiburg, West Germany
- Party: Nazi Party
- Other political affiliations: German People's Party
- Education: Doctor of Law
- Alma mater: University of Geneva; Humboldt University of Berlin; Marburg University; University of Münster
- Profession: Lawyer; Professor

Military service
- Allegiance: German Empire
- Branch/service: Imperial German Army
- Years of service: 1916–1918
- Unit: Landsturm
- Battles/wars: World War I

Friedrich Wilhelm Johannes Grimm (17 June 1888 – 16 May 1959) was a German lawyer, Nazi Party politician, and propagandist. He opposed the Treaty of Versailles, defended political assassinations during the Weimar Republic, supported the rise to power of the Nazis, and persecuted resistance fighters and opponents of the regime. He was a deputy of the Reichstag, was an expert on French policy and served as a German consul-general at Paris during the Second World War.

Following the end of the war, Grimm gained notoriety for his advocacy for a general amnesty for Nazi perpetrators, his Holocaust denial and his participation in the legal defense of former Nazi war criminals and officials, including the leader of the Naumann Circle, a neo-Nazi organization in West Germany.

== In the German Empire ==
=== Education ===
Grimm was born in Düsseldorf, the son of a railway surveyor, graduated from the Gymnasium in Essen in 1907 and studied law at the University of Geneva, the Humboldt University of Berlin and Marburg University. He completed his studies at the University of Münster, where he received his Doctor of Law degree in 1910. In 1912, he was assigned as a lawyer in training at the Essen public prosecutor's office. In 1914, after passing the second state law examination, he became a partner in a law firm in Essen.

=== War service ===
Grimm was conscripted in 1916 to serve in the Imperial German Army during World War I. His knowledge of the French language led to his assignment in a Landsturm unit as an interpreter and mail censor at a prisoner-of-war camp in Münster. He later was assigned to defend French and Belgian civilians before German military courts.

== In the Weimar Republic ==
=== Academic career ===
In 1921, Grimm received his habilitation in Münster with a work on international law concerning the Treaty of Versailles. Revision of the treaty was a focus of his publications, which he pursued for almost two decades. From 1922, Grimm worked as a lecturer at the University of Münster and advanced to an associate professorship of international law in 1927. That same year, he was named an honorary senator of the University of Marburg. From 1923 to 1933, Grimm was a co-editor of the prestigious law journal, Deutsche Juristen-Zeitung.

=== Legal career ===
==== Post-war defense of German interests ====
Grimm distinguished himself primarily as a successful lawyer in numerous political trials. Immediately after Germany's defeat, Grimm defended the Saar industrialist Robert Röchling of the Völklingen Ironworks before a French military tribunal for alleged war crimes. Röchling was accused of having confiscated raw materials and machinery in occupied France as an agent of the Prussian Ministry of War and using them in his factories. Grimm was successful in having Röchling's ten-year prison sentence suspended and obtaining his release after 22 months of pretrial detention. Grimm also defended German interests in numerous cases before the joint arbitration tribunals that had been established in Paris, Brussels and Bucharest by the Versailles Treaty. Due to Germany's inability to fulfill its reparations obligations, French military forces occupied the Ruhr in 1923. Grimm defended the economic and political interests of prominent figures such as Fritz Thyssen, Gustav Krupp von Bohlen und Halbach and the mayor of Duisburg, Karl Jarres, in French court proceedings.

==== Defense of political assassins and right-wing extremists ====
Grimm became known for his legal defense of nationalist and anti-republican elements. He defended Freikorps fighters such as Albert Leo Schlageter who attempted to blow up railway lines to sabotage the actions of the French occupiers. Despite Grimm's intervention, he was sentenced to death and was considered a martyr by many Germans. Grimm was more successful in defending 18-year-old Count Keller and his accomplices before a Belgian military court in Aachen. They had been arrested near Neuss, carrying explosives from a Reichswehr barracks. Their death sentences were commuted to prison terms.

Grimm also was involved in combating separatism on the left bank of the Rhine. He condoned the murders of separatists, some of which were supported by France, such as the 9 January 1924 assassinations of members of the Palatinate separatist government in Speyer that were carried out on the orders of the Bavarian state government. Grimm provided the assassins with a justification that legitimized their actions as self-defense of the state. He further enhanced his reputation in anti-republican and nationalist circles by defending perpetrators of Feme murders such as the Nazi Party politician, and Sturmabteilung (SA) officer, Edmund Heines, and the Nazi politician and leader of the Black Reichswehr, Paul Schulz. Grimm also defended the political assassin Richard Eckermann, whose acquittal was based on the argument that his action, carried out on behalf of the Black Reichswehr, was an act of self-defense for the state.

Grimm also gave public lectures on his defense of opponents of the Weimar Republic, which were very well received and published in book form, including the 1929 book Oberleutnant Schulz. Femeprozesse und Schwarze Reichswehr (First Lieutenant Schulz: Feme Trials and the Black Reichswehr). Grimm's lectures and brochures were part of a campaign to obtain amnesty for political assassins, which in October 1930 led to the suspension of all ongoing proceedings and the release of those still imprisoned. After the Nazi seizure of power, Grimm contacted the then State Secretary in the Prussian Justice Ministry, Roland Freisler, on 16 May 1933 and proposed compensation for the perpetrators of these political assassinations.

== During the Nazi Era ==
=== Grimm's antisemitism ===
Antisemitism was a prominent element in Grimm's political worldview, which he expressed through propaganda and also put into practice by participating in repression and persecution. In early 1929, he signed an appeal by Alfred Rosenberg's antisemitic Militant League for German Culture that aimed to "enlighten the German people about the connections between race, art and science, and moral and volitional values".

In April 1933, Grimm was involved in drafting the Law for the Restoration of the Professional Civil Service and the Law Concerning Admission to the Legal Profession at the Reich Ministry of Justice along with Reichsminister Franz Gürtner and his State Secretary Franz Schlegelberger. These statutes effectively banned large numbers of Jewish civil servants and lawyers from their livelihoods. Grimm welcomed this ban in an article he published in the Deutsche Juristen-Zeitung. In 1941, during a lecture before the Working Group on Criminal Justice of the National Socialist Association of Legal Professionals, Grimm blamed Jews for the poor reputation of criminal defense lawyers: "The Jewish defense attorney, who was a master of sophistry and the art of twisting the facts, who tried to make black appear white, greatly damaged the legal profession".

Grimm's antisemitic publications were promoted by the Reich Propaganda Ministry and many of his books and pamphlets were published with funds from either the ministry, the foreign office or the Nazi Party. The ministry published a directive on 12 January 1938, supporting the publication of an article by Grimm in the journal Deutsche Justiz (German Justice) on the "Jewish Question in Romania", stating: "The German press is hereby informed of the importance of this article".

Grimm blamed all foreign reactions to Germany's persecution of Jews on the "Jewish world conspiracy". Even after 1945, in a posthumously published autobiographical work, he described the Second World War in typically antisemitic terms as a "German-Jewish foreign policy war".

=== Nazi Party involvement ===
In May 1932, Grimm first met Adolf Hitler, who visited him at his private residence in Essen to discuss legal questions regarding a revision to the Treaty of Versailles. Shortly afterward, Hitler invited Grimm and his wife to his residence, the Berghof at the Obersalzberg. There, on 11 August 1932, Grimm and Hitler continued their discussion on methods for revising the treaty. Grimm proudly emphasized in his postwar autobiography that, despite the presence of other guests, Hitler invited him alone into his private sitting room where they continued their conversation. Grimm became an enthusiastic supporter of the Nazis and a propagandist for their aggressive foreign policy. After becoming Reich Chancellor, Hitler met Grimm at the Reich Chancellery on numerous occasions. Grimm, for his part, not only supported Hitler, but practically idolized him:

Anyone who has seen Adolf Hitler up close, anyone who has been captivated by his rousing speeches, cannot deny that this man has a mission, a calling that fills him, in which he believes, in which all his followers believe, with the power that can move mountains. But this is the essential point of this realization: that the mission bestowed upon Adolf Hitler, the historical mission that sets him apart from all other Germans, is a German mission, a mission that concerns us all, from which we cannot escape, however we may individually feel about the movement and its goals, a mission governed by one grand, ultimate idea before which everything small and insignificant must recede. This idea is: One people, one Reich, one leader; overcoming German particularism in every form; one German people, the Reich of the Germans; the realization of a centuries-old longing; this is Hitler's German mission.

Until 1933, Grimm belonged to the German People's Party (DVP). He was admitted to the Nazi Party on 1 May 1933 (membership number 2,550,332). In the parliamentary election of 12 November 1933, Grimm was elected to the Reichstag from electoral constituency 23 (Düsseldorf West). He initially served as a "guest" of the Nazi Party faction before being accepted into it. Reelected in 1936 and 1938, he retained his parliamentary seat until the fall of the Nazi regime in May 1945.

Grimm also held an office as a Nazi Party official. He was deputy head of the Office for Legal Support of the German People, which was Department III of Hans Frank's Legal Office in the Party Reichsleitung (Reich leadership) in Munich.

Grimm was a prominent advocate of Nazi foreign policy, which also meant engaging in propaganda work. He contributed ideas to Hitler's speech before the Reichstag on 21 May 1935, which Grimm called the "Peace Speech of 1935", in which Hitler announced Germany's rearmament in violation of previous treaty agreements. Grimm also gave lectures as a propaganda speaker for the Nazi Party, often to Nazi youth and student associations. In the Nazi Party/Foreign Organization's planning for speeches abroad on 1 May 1935, Grimm was selected as one of 52 speakers, and was assigned to deliver a speech in Cairo. In July 1935, he traveled to London and delivered a speech entitled "Hitler and Europe" before the congress of the Nationalist International, in which he stated that Hitler sought only peace and co-operation with other nations.

=== Lawyer for the Nazi government ===
Grimm's agreement with the policies of the Nazi Party also extended to the murder of political opponents. Grimm developed a theory according to which the commission of political murder was excusable as "killing in exceptional times". The Führer, as the supreme authority of the state, would make the judgment on this. In contrast, "the individual should never be the judge of whether another person is a political pest who must be eliminated. Exterminating political pests is the responsibility of the state".

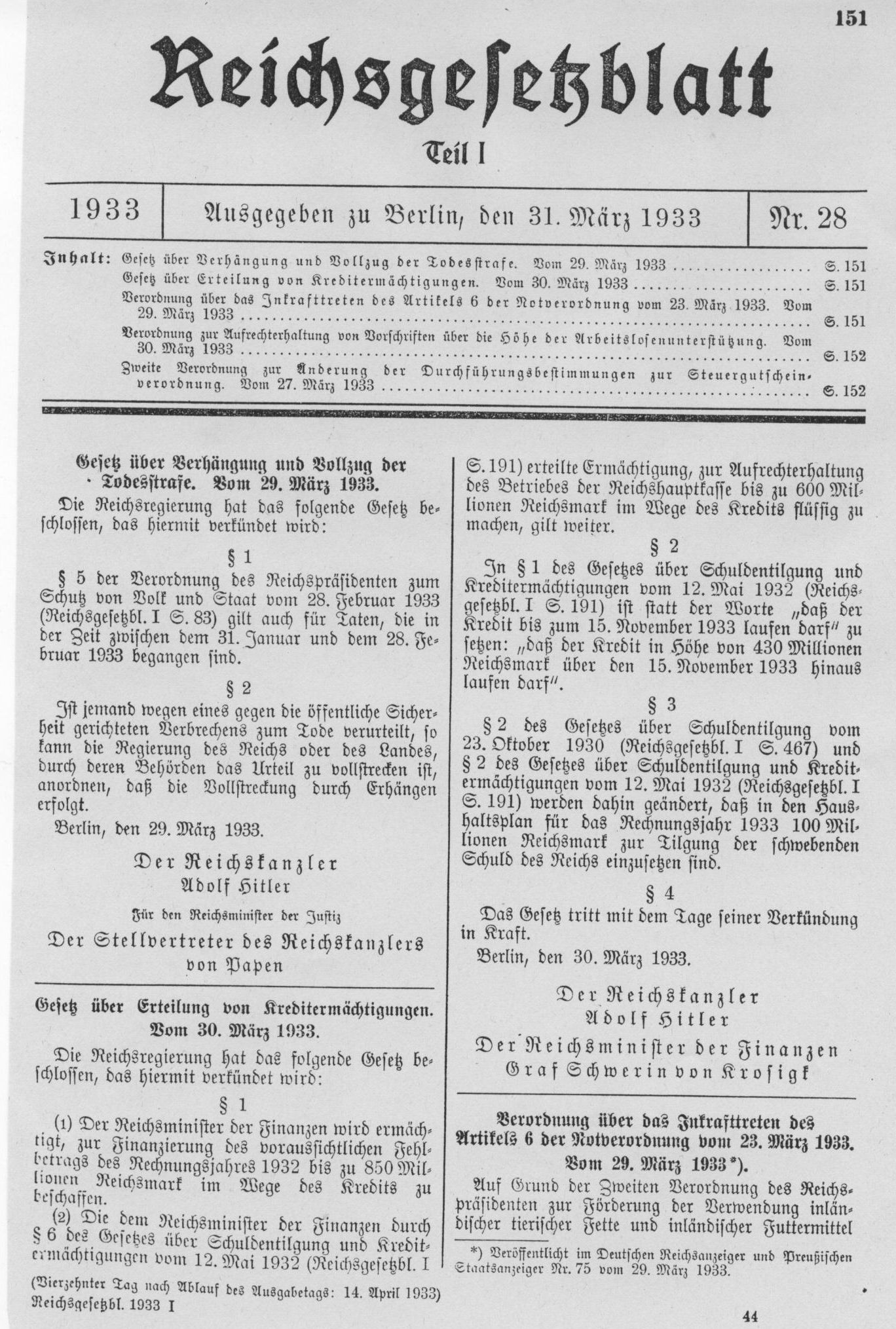
Promulgation of the Law on the Imposition and Execution of the Death Penalty ( the so-called "Lex van der Lubbe") in the Reichsgesetzblatt of 31 March 1933

==== The Reichstag Fire trial (1933) ====
The Reichstag building had been set ablaze on 27 February 1933. Many political observers at home and abroad suspected that the Nazis themselves had started the fire. The government wanted to turn the trial into a show trial against the Communist Party of Germany (KPD). The Reichstag Fire trial, which began on 21 September 1933, was the first trial in which Grimm acted on behalf of the Nazi government. Grimm, as an agent of the Propaganda Ministry, participated in the trial, sat at the prosecutor's table and was responsible for influencing foreign journalists.

The court determined that a conspiracy by the KPD could not be proven and the four accused Communist officials were acquitted. Marinus van der Lubbe was convicted as the lone perpetrator and was sentenced to death. In the Weimar Republic, arson was not a capital crime punishable by death. The imposition of the death penalty was based on a law hastily enacted after the Reichstag fire, the so-called "Lex van der Lubbe", which by imposing the death penalty retroactively, violated the principle of nulla poena sine lege (no punishment without law), a fundamental tenet of the rule of law. Grimm's task was to convince foreign correspondents that the new death penalty law and the entire trial were in accordance with the rule of law. He was convinced that Lubbe could not have acted alone and suspected the involvement of other unknown conspirators in an international Jewish conspiracy. He clung to this conspiracy theory until his death.

==== The trial of David Frankfurter (1936) ====
The leader of the Nazi Party in Switzerland was Wilhelm Gustloff. A young Yugoslavian Jew, David Frankfurter, had witnessed the abuse and persecution of Jews in Germany during a visit and wanted to take an action against it. On 4 February 1936, he shot and killed Gustloff in his house in Davos and then turned himself in to the police.

In Switzerland, the assassination aroused fears of being drawn into a conflict with Germany. Nazi propaganda blamed the murder on a Jewish world conspiracy and intended to use it to legitimize further persecution of Jews. Grimm participated in the legal representation at Switzerland's prosecution against Frankfurter. He formally appeared as the representative of Gustloff's widow in the trial in Chur. In reality, he was representing the interests of the German government and had discussed the case with Hitler in a personal meeting. Grimm even had a dedicated telephone line installed in the courthouse to directly discuss the progress of the trial with Hitler.

The judges did not accept Frankfurter's motive as self-defense against the unjust German system, and sentenced him to the maximum penalty of 18 years in prison. The judgment concluded that Frankfurter had acted alone, without any accomplices. Grimm came to a different conclusion and complained many years later: "Frankfurter must have had accomplices. This was clear ... But Frankfurter remained silent on this issue. All the efforts of the Swiss authorities were in vain. The question of accomplices could not be resolved. This was always the case in these major political trials: in the Reichstag fire trial, in Frankfurter's case, and in the Grünspan (sic) trial, no different."

==== The case of Herschel Grynszpan (1938–1941) ====
On 7 November 1938, Herschel Grynszpan shot and killed Ernst Eduard vom Rath, the German embassy attaché in Paris. German outrage over Rath's death provided the immediate pretext for the Kristallnacht pogrom. Nazi propaganda seized on the murder as another example of the alleged Jewish world conspiracy. Propaganda Minister Joseph Goebbels planned to transform the trial in Paris into another show trial, and Grimm was assigned to assist him. Grimm formally appeared as the representative of the Rath family as co-plaintiffs, but in reality was again a representative of the German government. He launched an investigation intended to prove the influence of a Jewish conspiracy that had the effect of further delaying the trial, which had not begun at the outbreak of the Second World War.

Grimm arrived in Paris with the German troops immediately after the city's fall in June 1940 and immediately began investigations with a Gestapo unit, aiming to seize Grynszpan and apprehend his alleged backers. Grynszpan was still jailed in southern France and, under German pressure, was handed over to the German occupiers by the Vichy government in mid-July and secretly flown to a Gestapo prison in Berlin. Grimm continued to be involved in seeking evidence of a Jewish conspiracy for preparation of a show trial before the People's Court in 1942. In the end, no trial was ever held, Grynszpan was incarcerated in Sachsenhausen concentration camp and, though his fate was never definitively determined, he most likely was murdered in German custody and was declared dead in 1960.

=== Foreign policy role in France ===
Grimm had been working since 1934 for the Ribbentrop Bureau, a Nazi Party parallel foreign ministry. He reported to Otto Abetz, the head of its France department. There, Grimm regularly compiled secret situation reports on French policy and diplomatic activities. For propaganda and infiltration tasks, Hitler had a German-French Society (DFG) founded in October 1935. Grimm served as its executive vice president, a post he would retain until 1945. The DFG published the German-French Monthly (DFM), a bilingual journal, and Grimm was one of its main contributors. In the March 1936 issue, Grimm attempted to justify to the French the German military occupation of the Rhineland. Maintaining contacts with the French right wing also was an important part of Grimm's duties, and he met with French politicians and journalists. At the outbreak of the war, Grimm was given the post of consul-general at the German embassy in Bern on 3 September 1939 where he would continue to monitor events in France, though he was not a trained diplomat. Grimm was considered such a specialist on France that in December 1939, he was summoned to personally brief Hitler on the French situation. After the fall of France in June 1940, he made frequent visits to Paris to consult with occupation authorities and French collaborators, or to give propaganda speeches. On 28 July 1944, shortly before the Allied invasion of southern France, Grimm delivered his last public address in France at Nice.

== Post-war life ==
=== Imprisonment and denazification ===
In May 1945, Grimm was taken prisoner by the French in the Black Forest and was held in several camps and prisons before being released for health reasons. On 8 August 1947, he was imprisoned again and was held for 16 months in Nuremberg prison, and was interrogated as a witness in connection with the Ministries Trial.

Grimm's denazification proceedings were held in Freiburg. During questioning, Grimm held the position that he had never served the Nazi government, but had only acted as a legal representative of private individuals in the trials of Gustloff and Grynszpan. Grimm's only sanction consisted of two of his books being banned as fascist and militaristic in the Soviet occupation zone. Grimm resumed political activity, and joined the extreme right-wing Deutsche Reichspartei. He received the title of honorary president of the Federal Association of Former Internees and Victims of Denazification, a right-wing extremist organization that was banned in 1959.

=== General amnesty advocacy ===
In 1949, Grimm resumed his work as a lawyer. Together with the lawyer Ernst Achenbach – whom he knew from the German embassy in Paris – he was an influential advocate of a general amnesty for Nazi criminals. In 1952, Achenbach had founded a committee in Essen for bringing about a general amnesty, of which Grimm was also a member. Supporters of a general amnesty capitalized on Grimm's fame and reputation in national-conservative circles. Grimm drafted a memorandum in which he demanded a general amnesty for Nazi perpetrators, arguing that internal pacification was a higher legal good than atonement. He ignored the fact that the concept of amnesty historically referred only to acts of war, but never to genocide, such as had been committed in the Holocaust. In July 1952, the American High Commissioner, John Jay McCloy, opposed a general amnesty. The German Bundestag rejected an amnesty bill in September 1952 but advocated a lenient approach in the joint review panels for war crimes trials operated with the Americans, which led to widespread pardons.

=== Legal defense of Nazi officials ===
Grimm participated in the defense of the former Military Commander in Belgium and Northern France General Alexander von Falkenhausen at his March 1951 trial in Belgium. He was convicted of deporting 25,000 Jews and utilizing enforced labor of the civilian population.

In 1951, when the Munich public prosecutor's office filed murder charges against Werner Best, who was among those responsible for the killings on the 1934 Night of the Long Knives, Grimm argued that Hitler's decree exempting from punishment those responsible for the acts had to be respected as a legal amnesty in the Federal Republic of Germany as well, "lest justice again be misused for political aims".

In 1953, Grimm defended the former state secretary of the Propaganda Ministry, Werner Naumann, after his attempt to infiltrate former Nazis into the Free Democratic Party (FDP) in North Rhine-Westphalia, which led to his subsequent arrest. Grimm portrayed Naumann as a martyr in a 1957 book documenting the court proceedings. This book has been described as a "milestone of Holocaust denial practiced in the Federal Republic of Germany".

On 2 June 1954, Grimm joined a petition for clemency for Leutnant Alfred Schniering, who had been convicted in 1949 in connection with the murder of six civilians from Nierstein and Oppenheim on 21 March 1945 in the final days of the war. Also in 1954, Grimm unsuccessfully defended the former Nazi Reichstag deputy and entrepreneur Fritz Kiehn in a trial for perjury, portraying him as a victim of politically motivated justice. The court concluded that Kiehn had not deliberately spoken an untruth, and convicted him of mere "negligent false testimony" and fined him 1,500 Deutsche Mark. Grimm spun this as a victory, saying: "Really, this sentence of a fine is so trivial that it should be regarded as a de facto acquittal."

Grimm also provided legal advice to Sepp Dietrich, who in 1957 was accused at Munich for his participation in the Night of the Long Knives purge of 1934. Dietrich was sentenced to 18 months in prison after being convicted as an accessory to the killings for providing the firing squad that executed six SA men.

=== Writings ===
Grimm continued to write, now appearing in smaller, far-right publications, no longer in Germany's largest publishing houses. He became one of the most important authors of Holocaust denial material in the early years of the Federal Republic. His main work during this time was his 1953 autobiography, Politische Justiz, die Krankheit unserer Zeit (Political Justice, the Disease of Our Time). In it, he questioned the extent and accuracy of the accounts given by victims in concentration camps. After his death, Mit offenem Visier: Aus der Lebenserinnerungen ein deutsche Rechtsanwalts (With Open Visor: From the Memoirs of a German Lawyer) was published in 1961, edited as a biography by Hermann Schild, the pseudonym of the Nazi propagandist and Holocaust denier Helmut Sündermann.

== Selected works ==
This is a listing of selected written works by Grimm.

- Vom Ruhrkrieg zur Rheinlandräumung (1930)
- Frankreich am Rhein (1931)
- Das deutsche Nein (1932)
- Der feind diktiert (1932)
- Reichsreform und Aussenpolitik (1933)
- Hitlers deutsche Sendung (1933)
- Frankreich an der Saar (1934)
- Wir sind im Recht! (1935)
- Politischer Mord und Heldenverehrung (1938)
- Die historischen Grundlagen unserer Beziehung zu Frankreich (1938)
- Die neue Kriegsschuldlüge (1940)
- Poincaré am Rhein (1940)
- Das Testament Richelieus (1940)
- Politische Justiz, die Krankheit unserer Zeit (1953)
- Mit offenem Visier: Aus der Lebenserinnerungen ein deutsche Rechtsanwalts (1961)

== Sources ==
- Berghoff, Hartmut (2015). The Respectable Career of Fritz K.: The Making and Remaking of a Provincial Nazi Leader. Berghahn Books. ISBN 978-1-782-38593-6.
- Grimm, Friedrich (1961). Mit offenem Visier: Aus der Lebenserinnerungen ein deutsche Rechtsanwalts. Druffel Verlag.
- Grimm, Friedrich (1953). Politische Justiz, die Krankheit unserer Zeit. Scheur.
- Klee, Ernst (2007). Das Personenlexikon zum Dritten Reich. Wer war was vor und nach 1945. Frankfurt-am-Main: Fischer-Taschenbuch-Verlag. ISBN 978-3-596-16048-8.
- Steveling, Lieselotte (1999). Juristen in Münster: Ein Beitrag zur Geschichte der Rechts- und Staatswissenschaftlichen Fakultät der Westfälischen Wilhelms-Universität Münster/Westfalen. Münster: LIT Verlag. ISBN 978-3-825-84084-6.
- Miller, Michael D. (2006). Leaders of the SS & German Police. Vol. 1 Reichsführer SS – Gruppenführer (Georg Ahrens to Karl Gutenberger). R. James Bender Publishing. ISBN 978-9-329-70037-2.
- Senfft, Heinrich (1988). Richter und andere Bürger. 150 Jahre politische Justiz und neudeutsche Herrschaftspublizistik 150 Jahre polit. Justiz u. neudt. Herrschaftspublizistik. Greno, Nördlingen. ISBN 978-3-891-90957-7.
- Stockhorst, Erich (1985). 5000 Köpfe: Wer War Was im 3. Reich. Arndt. ISBN 978-3-887-41116-9.
- Weiß, Hermann (2002). Biographisches Lexikon zum Dritten Reich. Frankfurt am Main: Fischer-Taschenbuch Verlag. ISBN 3-596-13086-7.
