= Damson (disambiguation) =

Damson or damson plum, also archaically called the "damascene" is an edible drupaceous fruit, a subspecies of the plum tree.

Damson may also refer to:

== People ==
- Damson Idris (born 1991), English television, movie and stage actor
- Willy Damson (1894-1944), German politician

== Places ==
- Damson Park, a stadium in Damson Parkway, Solihull, West Midlands, England

== Others ==
- Damson gin, a liqueur made from damson plums macerated in a sugar and gin syrup
- Damson (horse) (foaled 21 April 2002), an Irish Thoroughbred racehorse and broodmare
