= 1938 German parliamentary election and referendum =

- 10 April 1938; 4 December 1938

All 814 seats in the Reichstag 408 seats needed for a majority
- Registered: 49,634,569 (▲9.2%)
- Turnout: 99.6% (▲0.6pp)
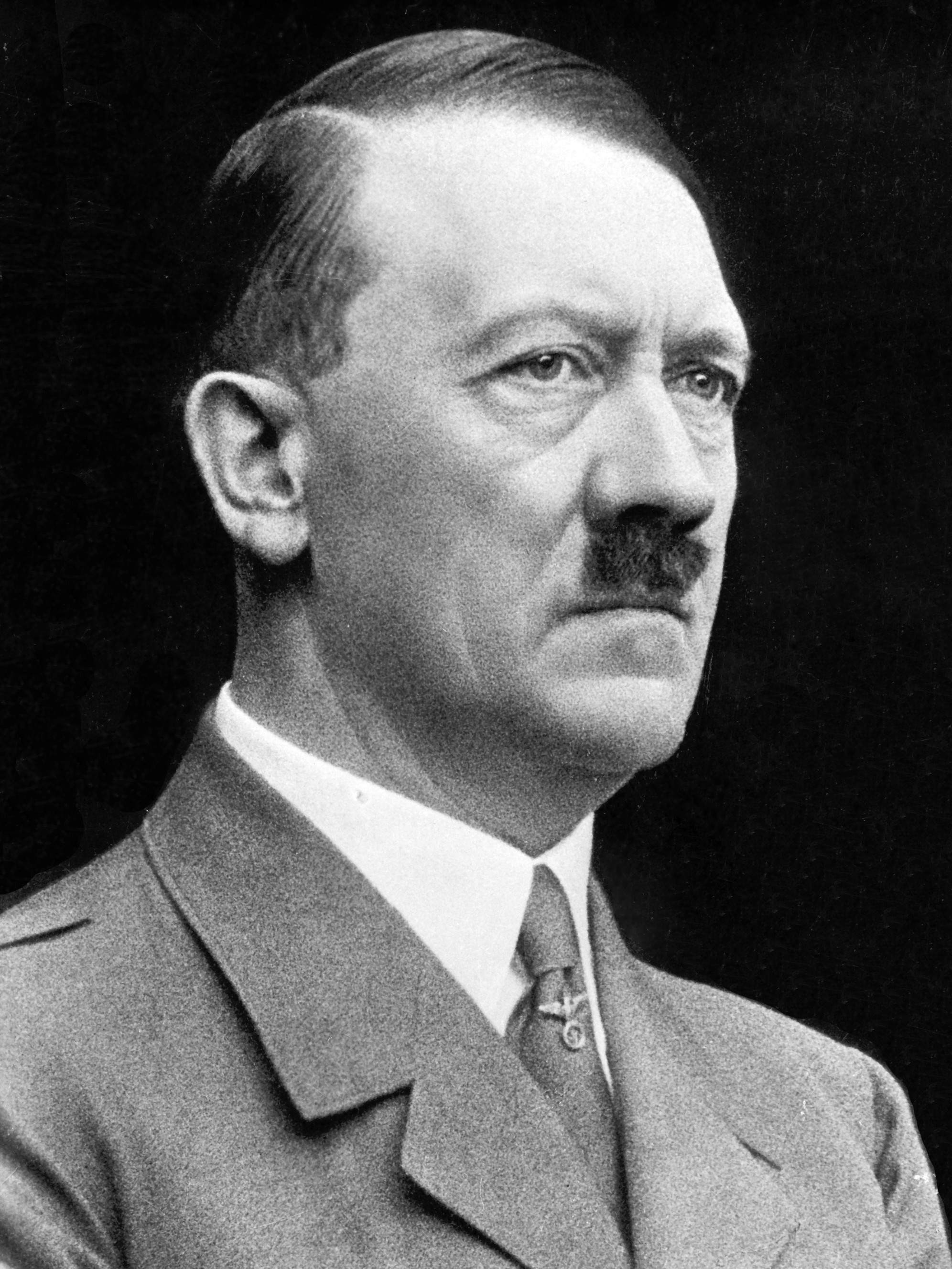
	Majority party
Leader	Adolf Hitler
Party	NSDAP
Last election	98.8%, 741 seats
Seats won	814
Seat change	▲73
Popular vote	48,905,004
Percentage	99.1%
Swing	▲0.3 pp
Government before election
Hitler cabinet
NSDAP
Government after election
Hitler cabinet
NSDAP

Parliamentary elections were held in Germany (including recently annexed Austria) on 10 April 1938. They were the final elections to the Reichstag during Nazi rule and took the form of a single-question referendum asking whether voters approved of a single list of Nazi and 11 pro-Nazi "guest" candidates for the 814-member Reichstag, as well as the recent annexation of Austria. Turnout in the election was officially 99.6% with 99.1% voting 'yes' in Germany and Austria.

The elections were held largely to rally official support from the new Ostmark (Austrian) province, although further elections for 41 seats were held in the recently annexed Sudetenland on 4 December. NSDAP candidates and "guests" officially received 97.32% of the votes.

The recently completed Kraft durch Freude cruise ship MV Wilhelm Gustloff was anchored in international waters near the United Kingdom to serve as a floating polling station for German and Austrian citizens living in the UK. On 10 April 1938, 1,978 voters (including 806 Austrians) were ferried from Tilbury, east of London. Only ten voted against annexation.

== Results ==
=== Germany ===
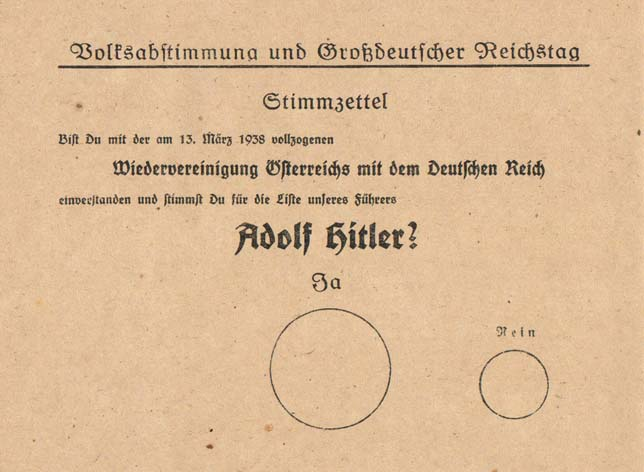
Ballot reading: "Do you approve of the reunification of Austria with the German Reich accomplished on 13 March 1938 and do you vote for the list of our Führer, Adolf Hitler?"

Party	Votes	%	Seats
Nazi Party and guests	48,905,004	99.08	814
Against	454,952	0.92	–
Total	49,359,956	100.00	814
Valid votes	49,359,956	99.85	
Invalid/blank votes	75,667	0.15	
Total votes	49,435,623	100.00	
Registered voters/turnout	49,634,569	99.60	
Source: Direct Democracy

=== Sudetenland ===
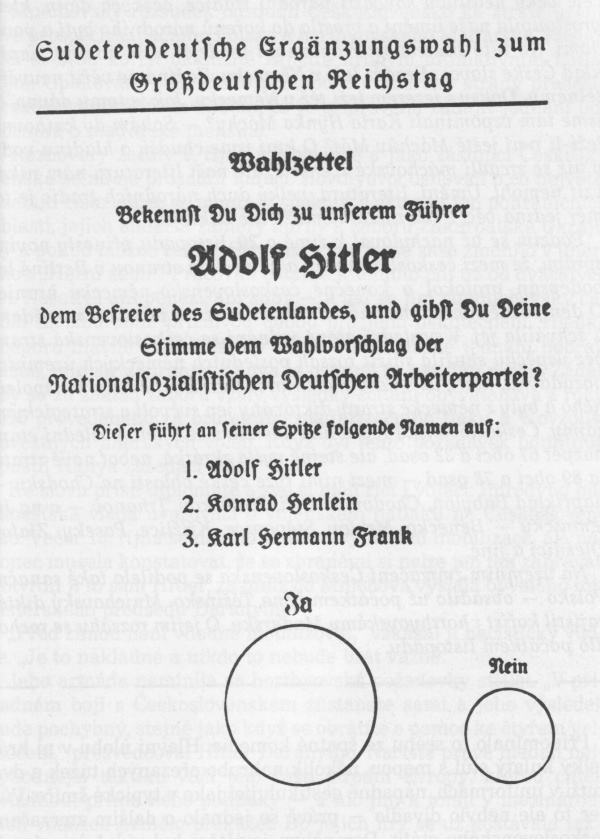
Ballot for the Sudeten election, carried out on 4 December after the annexation of the Sudetenland. It would be the last election under Nazi rule.

Party	Votes	%	Seats
Nazi Party and guests	2,464,681	98.90	41
Against	27,427	1.10	–
Total	2,492,108	100.00	41
Valid votes	2,492,108	99.78	
Invalid/blank votes	5,496	0.22	
Total votes	2,497,604	100.00	
Registered voters/turnout	2,532,863	98.61	
Source: Direct Democracy

== Aftermath ==
The new Reichstag, the last of the German Reich, convened for the first time on 30 January 1939, electing a presidium headed by incumbent President of the Reichstag Hermann Göring. It convened only a further seven times, the last on 26 July 1942; among the measures passed was a renewal of the Enabling Act of 1933 for additional four years and a law giving Hitler power of life and death over every citizen.

On 25 January 1943 Hitler postponed elections for a new Reichstag until after the war, with the inaugural to take place after another electoral term, subsequently on 30 January 1947 by which point the body, and the Nazi state, had ceased to exist. They were the final elections held in a united Germany prior to 1990 after German reunification.

As of 2026, the 1938 German referendum is the last referendum held in Germany.

== See also ==
- Guests of the Nazi Party Faction in the Reichstag
- List of Reichstag deputies in the Third Reich (4th electoral term)
