= Fritz Kiehn =

German manufacturer and Nazi (1885–1980)

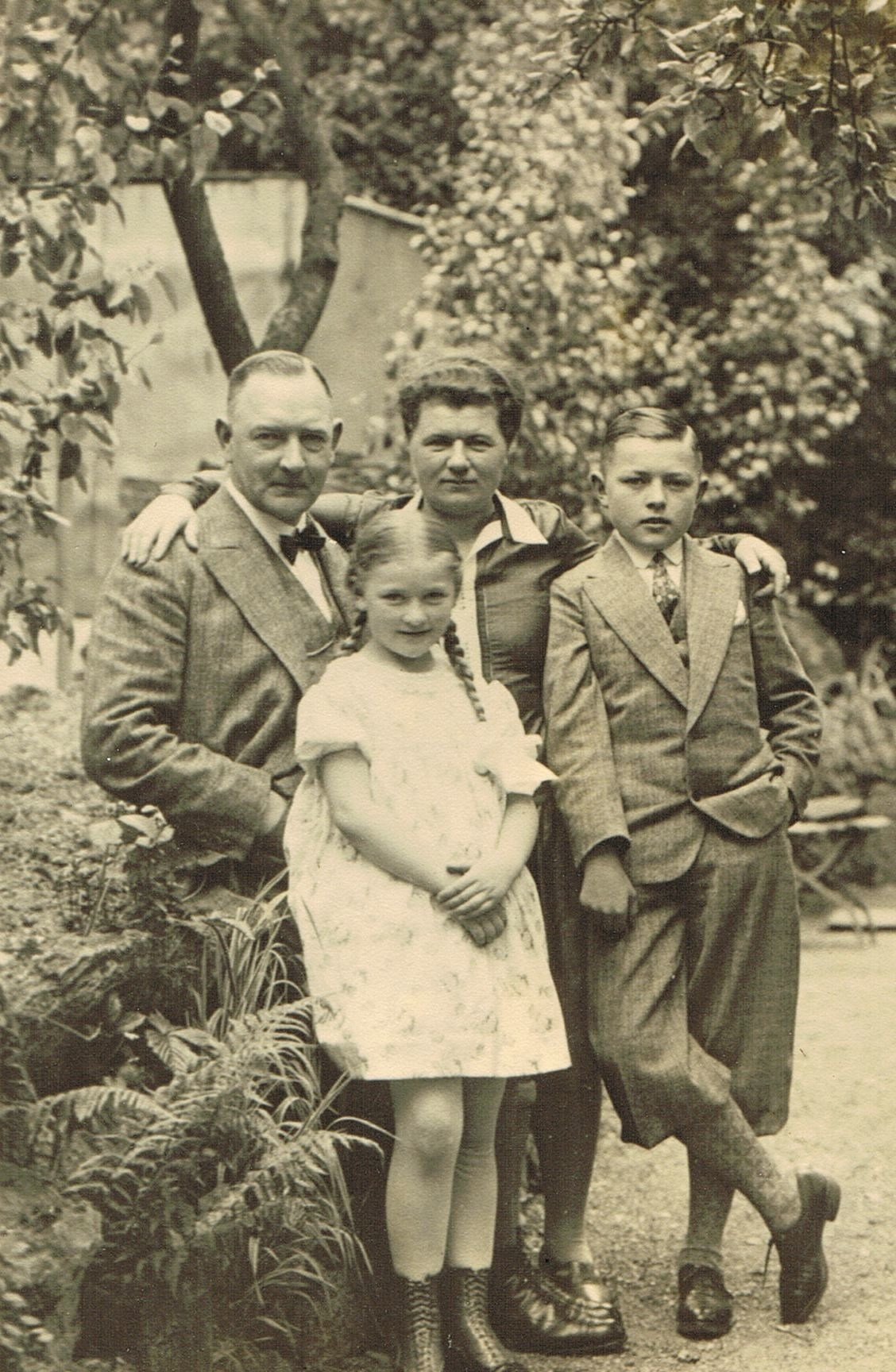
Fritz Kiehn 1925 with his family

Fritz Kiehn (15 October 1885 – 1 September 1980) was a German cigarette paper manufacturer who became a Nazi Party member of the Reichstag from 1932 to 1945. Under Nazi Germany, he profited greatly from Aryanization measures. After Germany's defeat in the Second World War, he was arrested, underwent denazification and was imprisoned for four years. After his release, he regained control of his company, which he led until 1972, and even reentered local politics.

== Early life ==
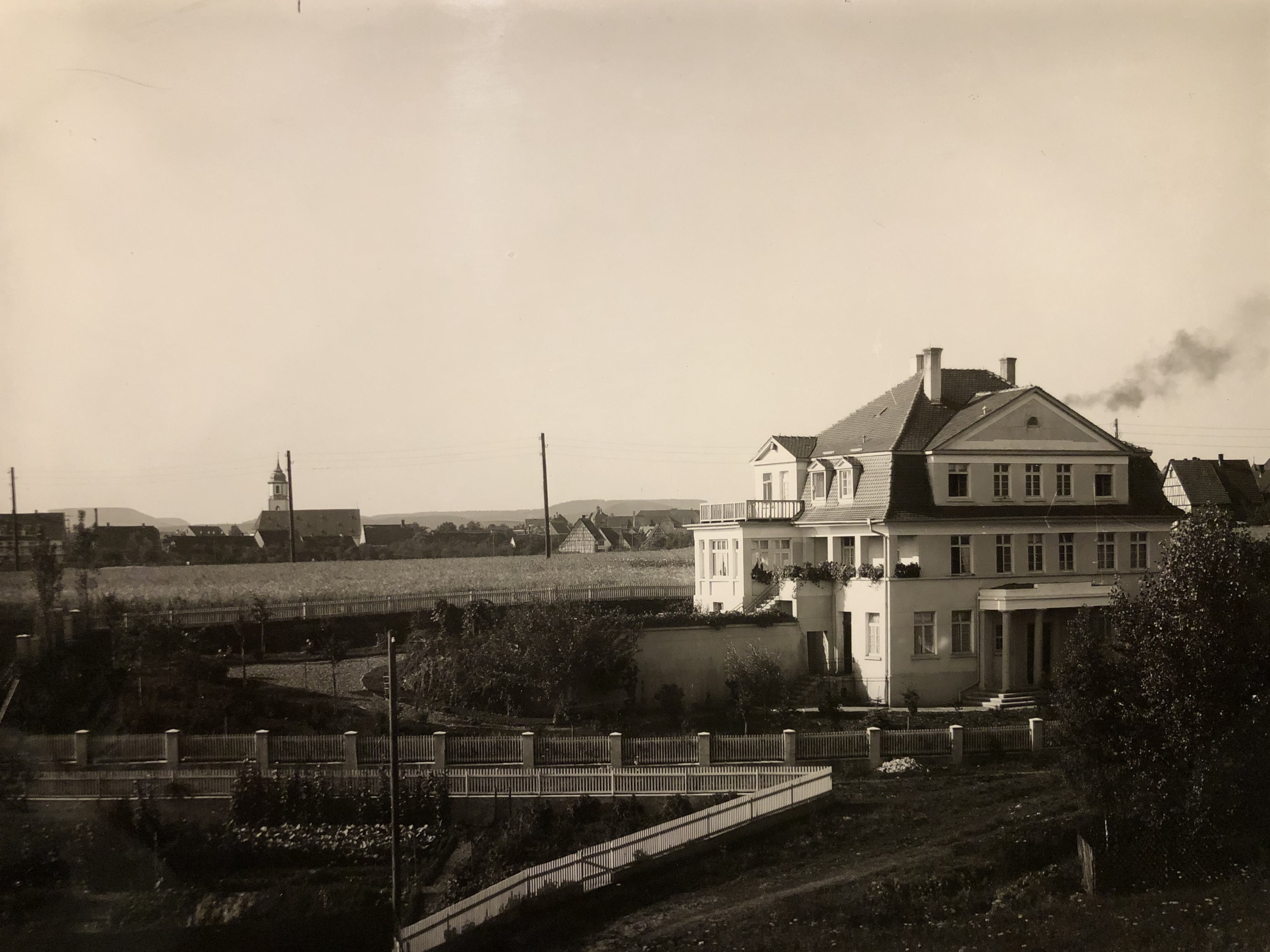
Villa in Kiehn-Park Deibhalde, Trossingen (1925)

Fritz Kiehn was born in Burgsteinfurt, Westphalia, as one of twelve children to Karl Kiehn (1842–1896), a Prussian police officer, and his wife Auguste, née Grull (1847–1927), the daughter of a hat maker. After completing his secondary education at the Realschule in Lemgo, Kiehn went on to apprentice in business at a cardboard factory in Hanover. He then worked as a traveling salesman for several paper-processing companies. In 1908, he moved to Trossingen in Württemberg, where he secured a position with the carton manufacturer Birk-Koch.

In 1911, Kiehn married Bertha Neipp, the daughter of a prominent and wealthy Trossingen family. With the help of her dowry, he was able to purchase a stationery shop in 1912, where he sold paper, books, office supplies, and typewriters to local businesses, including the renowned harmonica and accordion manufacturer Hohner.

After World War I, Kiehn expanded into manufacturing cigarette paper for self-rolled cigarettes, a profitable business during the economic crises of the Weimar Republic. He founded the Efka Works, named after his initials. In 1933, Hohner employed around 4,000 people, while Kiehn’s company, founded in 1932, had just 70 employees.

== Nazi career ==
With the rise of the Nazis, Kiehn became known as the "leader of southern German industry". His goal was to become a major industrialist with a workforce of 1,000 employees.

As the Nazis gained strength in the late 1920s, Kiehn saw an opportunity to position himself politically against the influential, pro-democracy Hohner family in local politics. On 1 April 1930 he joined the Nazi Party (NSDAP) (membership number 233,075) and founded the Trossingen local chapter. In 1931, he was elected to the Trossingen city council with the highest number of votes.

During the election campaigns of 1932, Kiehn emerged as one of the key Nazi agitators in southern Württemberg and one of the largest financial backers of the regional NSDAP. By this time, the swastika flag was already flying at his factory. At the July 1932 parliamentary election, he was elected as a Nazi to the Reichstag from electoral constituency 31 (Württemberg), and retained this seat until the fall of Nazi Germany in May 1945.

After Adolf Hitler gained power in Germany on 30 January 1933, Kiehn rose from the leader of a local NSDAP chapter to become the district leader, deputy (until 1937) Gau economic advisor, and a highly influential figure both in Trossingen and across the region. The street in front of his factory was named after him. On his 50th birthday, 15 October 1935, the city awarded him the title of honorary citizen. Prominent Nazi figures frequently visited him, and he rapidly accumulated more official positions.

Kiehn became president of the Chambers of Industry and Commerce in Rottweil and Stuttgart, the Wehrwirtschaftsrat (Defense Economic Council) for Gau Württemberg-Hohenzollern, the Württemberg branch of the Reich Association of German Industry, and the newly established Economic Chamber for Württemberg/Hohenzollern in 1936. From 1936 to 1943, he was a member of the International Chamber of Commerce. He also served as president of the Württemberg Industry and Trade Day and, in that capacity, as the managing director of the Deutsche Verlags-Anstalt. Locally, he was referred to in the newspaper as "President Fritz Kiehn, M.d.R." (Member of the Reichstag).

=== Stock speculation with shares of truck manufacturer Magirus. LKW-Herstellers Magirus ===
Through the process of Gleichschaltung (Nazi consolidation of power), Kiehn secured leadership positions in industrial enterprises as both an NSDAP representative and holder of public offices, including seats on the supervisory boards of major companies. Notably, he joined the supervisory board of NSU in Neckarsulm and, in the spring of 1934, that of the truck manufacturer C.D. Magirus AG in Ulm.

Magirus had been struggling during the Great Depression, with its stock prices still low in 1934. However, after the Nazi rise to power, the company's situation improved significantly. As a leading producer of field kitchens, Magirus received a large order from the NSDAP around the turn of 1933/1934 for over 100 specialized field kitchen vehicles. Kiehn was well aware of Hitler's rearmament plans, which promised a prosperous future for Magirus with many more contracts expected in the coming years.

When Kiehn learned of Magirus's strong economic outlook from internal performance reports presented to the Supervisory Board, he used this insider knowledge to make deals in Magirus shares. Shortly after joining the company, he signed a purchase order for a three-quarter majority of Magirus shares, facilitated by the Tuttlingen manufacturer Otto Stäbler and financed by a loan. This order was a binding mandate for Kiehn, who aimed to become one of the leading industrialists in Württemberg with control of Magirus. The transactions were handled by the Stuttgart bank “Pick & Cie,” which had been seized from its owner in 1933 and was backed by Stäbler as a major partner.

By the end of 1934, Kiehn had himself elected Chairman of the Supervisory Board, having already secured a majority on the board through temporarily transferred voting rights from some shareholders. He publicly stated his goal to maintain Magirus's "autonomy and independence" while transforming it into a “model National Socialist company.”

The process of acquiring the Magirus shares was complicated and time-consuming, and the stock price began to rise due to improved economic conditions before Kiehn had completed the purchase. As a result, he ended up spending four times the initially planned amount and had to seek financial support from his bank and other lenders. Despite this, Kiehn leveraged his new power to have Karl Trefs, the director of Magirus, dismissed in July 1935. Trefs was supported by Eugen Maier, the NSDAP district leader in Ulm, who opposed the firing of his protégé, who had recently become president of the Ulm Chamber of Commerce. Maier and other NSDAP officials accused Kiehn of speculation, which he denied. The matter was brought to the Gauleiter, Wilhelm Murr, who, appreciative of Kiehn's earlier contributions during the Nazi struggle, supported him.

By the end of 1935, Kiehn had achieved his goal of becoming the owner of Magirus, though the rising stock prices had placed him in significant financial difficulty. He was fortunate to be able to sell the company to the Cologne-based Klöckner-Deutz AG in early 1936. The new owner renamed the company Magirus-Deutz, with all major decisions and leadership now determined from Cologne. Despite his temporary financial struggles, Kiehn made a significant profit from the sale.

However, his business dealings attracted criticism within the Württemberg NSDAP circles. Even Gauleiter Murr of Stuttgart turned against him, attempting unsuccessfully to have Kiehn expelled from the party.

Kiehn was also involved in disputes with other high-ranking Nazi officials. One intimate enemy was the Gau economic advisor and thus Nazi functionary responsible for Aryanizations in Württemberg, Walter Rheile. The Gauamtsleiter für Technik, Rudolf Rohrbach, was also an opponent of Kiehn, who secured admission to higher Nazi circles with invitations to take part in hunting trips, among other things. However, Kiehn had contacts to the Reich Chancellery under Rudolf Hess and to Reichsführer-SS Heinrich Himmler, and was accepted into the Freundeskreis der Wirtschaft (Circle of Friends) of the Reichsführer-SS in 1938. Kiehn also counted among his friends high-ranking SS functionaries Gottlob Berger and Hans-Adolf Prützmann, as well as Reichsminister of the Interior Wilhelm Frick.

=== Profiting from Aryanizations ===
In 1938, Kiehn acquired the cigarette packaging factory of Hugo Büttner in Berlin, a Jewish businessman persecuted by the Nazis. Although the Berlin Gau economic advisor had initially planned for another buyer, the deal had not been finalized, and Kiehn outbid the competitor, paying 300,000 Reichsmarks. As with many cases of "Aryanization," Büttner received nothing from the sale. He was unable to emigrate and was later reportedly deported to Warsaw.

Additionally, starting in 1938, Kiehn sought to oust the Jewish owners of the Fleischer tissue paper factory in Eislingen/Fils, attempting to seize control of the company despite resistance from the Württemberg Gau economic advisor, Rheile. In 1940, Kiehn took over the factory for just a fifth of the originally negotiated price—far below its actual value. The previous deal with Gustav Schickedanz was annulled in Kiehn’s favor.

On 20 April 1942 Kiehn was promoted to SS-Obersturmbannführer (SS number 239,095).

The outbreak of World War II further expanded his economic empire. He established branches in Strasbourg and Poznań and acquired shares in a factory in the German-occupied Litzmannstadt (today, Łódź).

== Postwar Federal Republic of Germany ==
After the defeat of Nazi Germany, Kiehn fled to Innsbruck, where he was arrested by U.S. soldiers and imprisoned for four years. Following his denazification process in 1949, he regained control of the Efka Works. Starting in 1949, at the age of 64, he began to rebuild his life. The following year, the government of Württemberg's Minister-President Gebhard Müller granted him a 3-million DM loan to rehabilitate a former munitions company in Tuttlingen. A parliamentary investigation into the matter had no consequences for Kiehn.

In 1953, Kiehn was re-elected to the Trossingen city council. In 1955, he was quietly reinstated as an honorary citizen, a title stripped from him in 1945. Kiehn was one of the most generous benefactors of the town, second only to the directors of the Hohner harmonica factory. He donated a municipal sports complex, a street, and the Fritz-Kiehn-Platz, which he and his wife Berta had helped design. It was renamed in 2010.

In 1954, former Nazi Friedrich Grimm defended Kiehn in a trial for alleged perjury. Grimm tried to portray Kiehn as a victim of political justice, despite the facts. Kiehn was convicted of negligent false testimony but considered it a success. He had his defense speech printed and sent it to many acquaintances.

In 1968, Kiehn hosted Baldur von Schirach, the former Nazi Reichsleiter and Reichsjugendführer (Reich Youth Leader), who had been convicted at the Nuremberg Trials and later released from prison. Schirach’s son Robert had married Kiehn’s granddaughter Elke, and Robert was managing director of one of Kiehn’s companies. This marriage produced the writer and lawyer Ferdinand von Schirach and writer Norris von Schirach. Baldur von Schirach became friends with Kiehn’s daughter, Gretl.

At 87, in 1972, Kiehn lost his decision-making power in his struggling company due to restructuring efforts. By then, he had already passed most of his shares in the Efka Works to his grandchildren Herbert E. Kiehn, Ina Kiehn, and Elke von Schirach. He had to transfer the remaining shares. Fritz Kiehn died in 1980, just before his 95th birthday, as a respected citizen of Trossingen. In 2010, Fritz-Kiehn-Platz was renamed Theresienplatz in honor of the 75th anniversary of the Theresienkirche, though the name of the sports hall remains unchanged (as of 2023). However, in 2000, the city council officially confirmed the revocation of his honorary citizenship.

== Collections ==
In the 1960s, Fritz Kiehn owned the Momella hunting farm in Tanzania, where the film Hatari starring John Wayne and Hardy Krüger was shot. His zoological and ethnographic collection included over 600 objects, featuring hunting trophies and specimens of local wildlife, as well as bears and nearly all African antelope and big cat species, along with ivory and rhino exhibits. Some of these items are part of the collections at the Auberlehaus Museum and are on display there.

In November 2007, Kiehn’s extensive collection of works by the Nazi-era sculptor Fritz Behn, which he had made accessible as a private museum in Bad Dürrheim, was dismantled and auctioned off in Munich.
