= Willy Damson =

German banker (1894–1944)

Wilhelm "Willy" Damson

Reichstag Deputy
- In office March 1936 – March 1944

Leader, Nazi Party Budget Office
- In office 1934–1943

Personal details
- Born: Wilhelm Damson; 22 January 1894 Germersheim, Rhenish Palatinate, Kingdom of Bavaria, German Empire
- Died: December 1944 (aged 50) Dachau concentration camp, Bavaria, Nazi Germany
- Party: Nazi Party
- Occupation: Auditor; Politician

Wilhelm "Willy" Damson (22 January 1894 – December 1944) was a German banker and self employed businessman who became a Nazi Party official and politician. He served as a financial specialist in the Sturmabteilung (SA) and in the Party's national leadership. He also served as a deputy in the Reichstag from 1936 to 1944. He was arrested on corruption charges and incarcerated in the Dachau concentration camp where he died.

== Early life ==
Damson was born in 1894 at Germersheim, then part of the Kingdom of Bavaria. After attending Volksschule and a humanist Gymnasium, he completed a banking apprenticeship and then worked in the banking business until 1924. After that, he worked as a self-employed businessman until 1933.

== Nazi Party career ==
Damson joined the Nazi Party on 1 October 1930 (membership number 336,620) and, as an early Party member, in 1939 would be awarded the Golden Party Badge. He was active in the German Labour Front from 1933 to 1934. At the same time, he also served on the municipal council of the city of Kehl. In February 1934, he became an employee of the Reich Audit Office of the Nazi Party, where he served as Reich Senior Auditor (Reichsoberrevisor).

Just days after the Night of the Long Knives, in which large numbers of the SA leadership were killed or arrested, Damson was named leader of the administrative office (Verwaltungsamt) and acting treasurer of the Supreme SA Leadership on 4 July 1934. Damson also became head of Main Office II (Reich Budget Office) in the Party's national leadership office (Reichsleitung) in Munich. Damson continued as head of Main Office II under Franz Xaver Schwarz, the Reich Treasurer of the Party, until 1943. He carried the Party rank of Oberdienstleiter (Senior Service Leader), serving as Schwarz's representative on the Committee for the Procurement of Hitler Youth Homes and, from 13 January 1942, his representative for ethnic issues.

At the March 1936 parliamentary election, Damson was elected as a deputy of the Reichstag, from electoral constituency 15 (East Hanover). At the April 1938 election, he switched to representing constituency 18 (Westphalia South).

In 1944, Damson was arrested on charges of corruption in the Germanic Control Center (Germanischen Leitstelle ) in Brussels and was sent to the Dachau concentration camp, where he died in December of the same year.

== See also ==
- de:Willy Damson

== Sources ==
- Joachim Lilla / Martin Döring: extras in uniform. The members of the Reichstag 1933-1945 , Droste, Düsseldorf 2004. Spezial: ISBN 3-7700-5254-4
- Patzwall, Klaus D. (2004). Goldene Parteiabzeichen und seine Verleihungen ehrenhalber 1934-1944. Verlag Klaus D. Patzwall. ISBN 3-931533-50-6.
- Stockhorst, Erich (1985). 5000 Köpfe: Wer War Was im 3. Reich. Arndt. ISBN 978-3-887-41116-9.
- Willi Damson biography in the Reichstag Members Database
