= Law on imposition and enforcement of the death penalty =

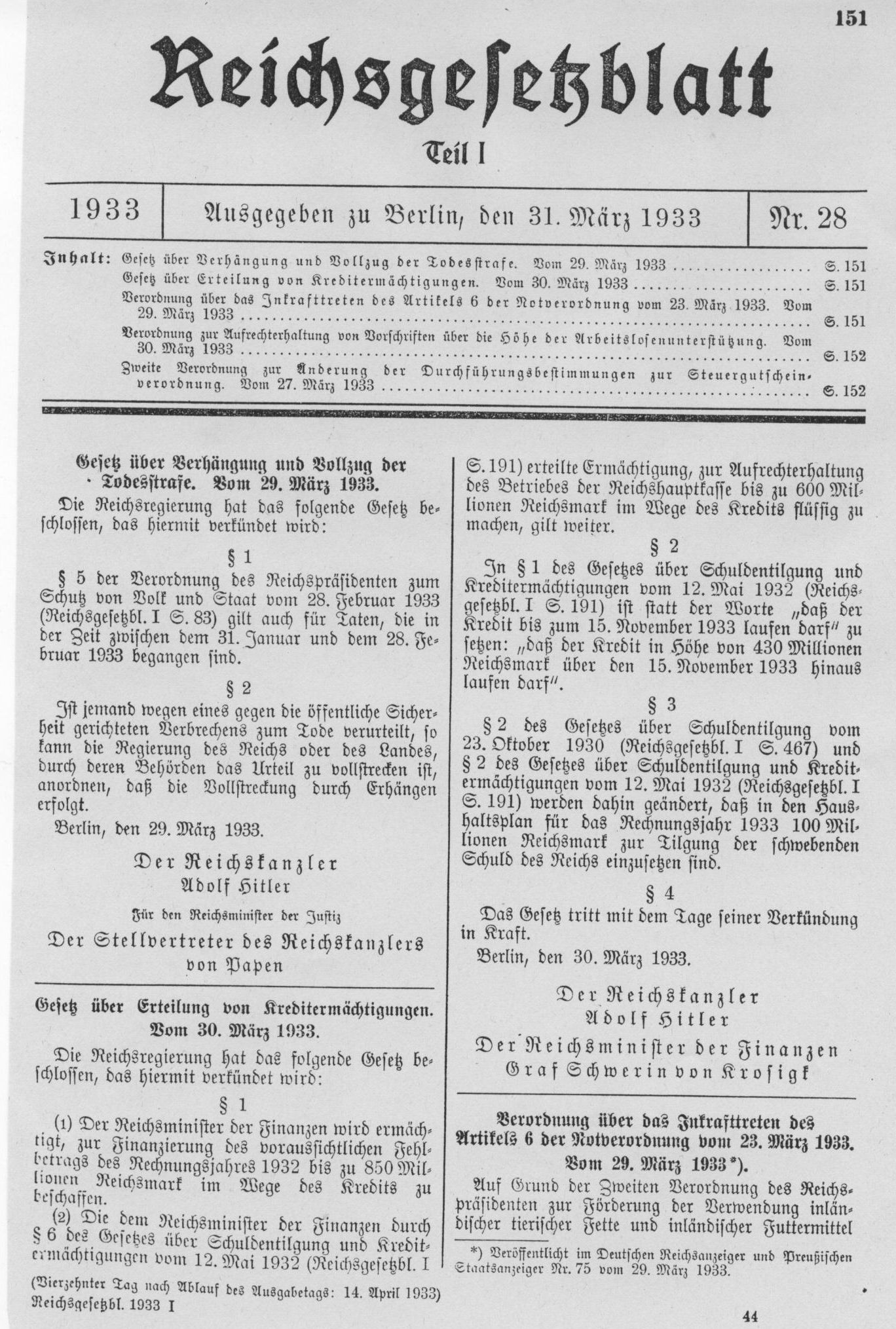
The Reichsgesetzblatt of 31 March 1933: Law on the Imposition and Execution of the Death Penalty

Law on imposition and enforcement of the death penalty (known colloquially as Lex van der Lubbe) was a German law enacted by the Nazi regime on 29 March 1933, that imposed the death penalty for certain crimes such as arson and high treason, that had formerly meant whole life imprisonment. The name derives from the fact that the law formed the legal basis for the imposition of the death penalty on Marinus van der Lubbe, who had been caught in the arson attack on the Reichstag on 28 February 1933.

== Content ==
The Reichstag Fire Decree, which had been in force since 28 February 1933, had contained in § 5 a list of crimes for which the death penalty was to be imposed instead of life imprisonment as before. The Law on the Imposition and Execution of the Death Penalty, passed by Hitler's government on 29 March on the basis of the Enabling Act, extended the period of validity of this § 5 retroactively to 31 January 1933, thereby breaking the principle of the prohibition of retroactivity of criminal laws (Nulla poena sine lege) guaranteed in Article 116 of the Weimar Reich Constitution. It could thus be applied to van der Lubbe, who had confessed in court to having set fire to the Reichstag on 27 February.

The Lex van der Lubbe allowed hanging as a method of execution; whereas according to the specifications of the Reich Penal Code valid until then, the death penalty had been "to be carried out by beheading alone".

== History ==
The law was passed specifically after the Reichstag fire in order to be able to sentence Marinus van der Lubbe and his co-defendants to the death penalty, although it had not yet applied to arson at the time of the crime. This was a deliberate disregard of long-standing principles of the rule of law, as the penalty was introduced retroactively (cf. nullum crimen sine lege).

On 30 January 1946, the Allied Control Council also repealed the law on the imposition and execution of the death penalty by Control Council Law No. 11.

== Literature ==
- Epping, Volker (1995). "Die Lex van der Lubbe – zugleich ein Beitrag zur Bedeutung des Grundsatzes "nullum crimen, nulla poena sine lege". Der Staat. 34: 243–267.

== See also ==
- Law in Nazi Germany
