= Reichstag (Nazi Germany) =

Legislative body of Nazi Germany

Greater German Reichstag Großdeutscher Reichstag
- Legislative body of Germany

Type
- Type: Unicameral

History
- Established: 23 March 1933
- Disbanded: 26 April 1942 (actual last session, adjourned sine die); 8 May 1945 (surrender of Germany); 30 January 1947 (nominal expiration of final term)
- Preceded by: Weimar Reichstag
- Succeeded by: West Germany: Bundestag; East Germany: Volkskammer

Leadership
- President: Hermann Göring

Structure
- Seats: 876 (at dissolution)
- Political groups: Government (one-party state): Nazi Party and guests (876)

Elections
- Voting system: Plebiscitary show elections
- First election: 12 November 1933
- Last election: 4 December 1938

Meeting place
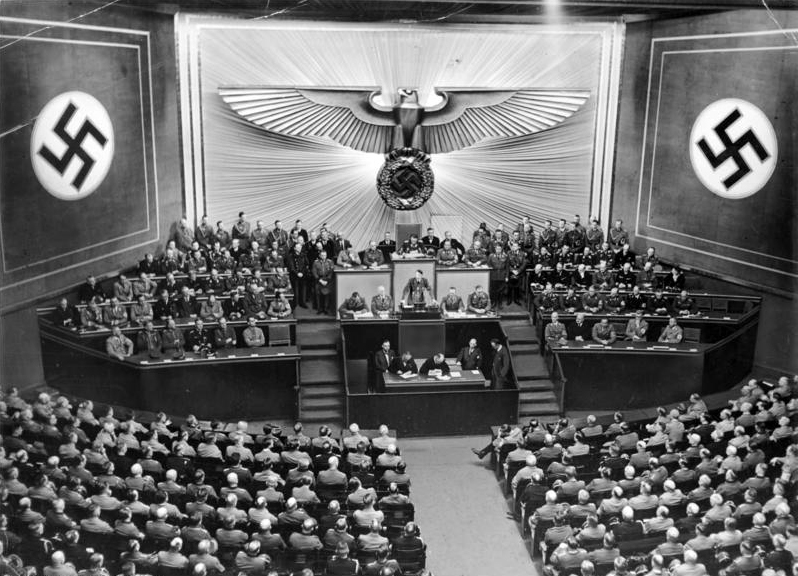
- Kroll Opera House, Berlin

Constitution
- Constitution of the German Reich (de jure)

The Reichstag (German: [ˈʁaɪ̯çstaːk], "Diet of the Realm"), officially the Greater German Reichstag (German: Großdeutscher Reichstag) after 1938, was the national parliament of Nazi Germany from 1933 to 1945. Following the Nazi seizure of power and the enactment of the Enabling Act of 1933, it functioned purely as a rubber stamp for the actions of Adolf Hitler's dictatorship – always by unanimous consent – and as a forum to listen to Hitler's speeches. In this purely ceremonial role, the Reichstag convened only 20 times, the last on 26 April 1942. The President of the Reichstag (Reichstagspräsident) throughout this period was Hermann Göring.

During this period, the Reichstag was sometimes derisively referred to by the German public as the "teuerste Gesangsverein Deutschlands" (the most expensive singing club in Germany) due to frequent singing of the national anthem during sessions. To avoid holding scheduled elections during World War II, in 1943 Hitler extended the term of office of the current Reichstag (elected in late 1938 to serve in 1939–1943) to serve a special eight-year term to end on 30 January 1947.

== History ==
=== Background ===
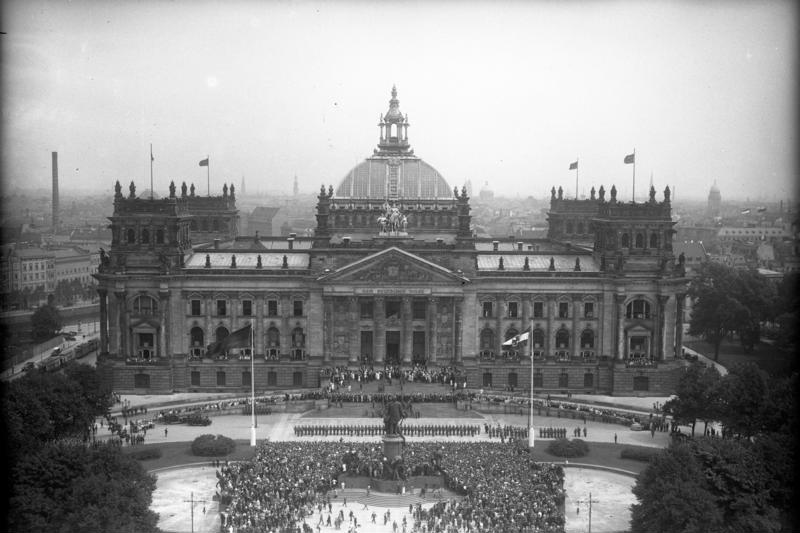
The Reichstag building in 1932, before the fire

In 1920–1923 and from 1930 on, the Weimar Republic's democratically elected Reichstag was frequently circumvented by two legal instruments:

- The use of special powers granted to the President of Germany under an Emergency Decree in Article 48 of the Weimar Constitution
- The use of Enabling acts (which were seen as constitutional since they were passed by a two-thirds majority, the same as was required for an amendment), especially during 1919–1923 and then finally in 1933.

The former practice became more and more common after 1930. Due to the proportional representation voting system, it was extremely difficult for a government to have a stable majority. Frequently, when a Chancellor was voted out of office, his successor could not be assured of a majority. As a result, Chancellors often tried to use Article 48 simply to conduct government business.

Following the Reichstag fire on 27 February 1933, Hitler persuaded President Paul von Hindenburg to issue the Decree for the Protection of People and State, which suspended most of the civil rights enshrined in the constitution. When elections in March did not yield a Nazi majority, Hitler had to rely on his coalition partner, the German National People's Party (DNVP), to command a majority in the Reichstag.

At the new Reichstag's first session, Hitler introduced the Enabling Act of 1933, which allowed the government to enact laws on its own authority for a four-year period. With certain exceptions (which were in practice disregarded), those laws could deviate from articles in the constitution. Though formally only the Government as a whole could enact laws, Hitler in effect exercised that right by himself.

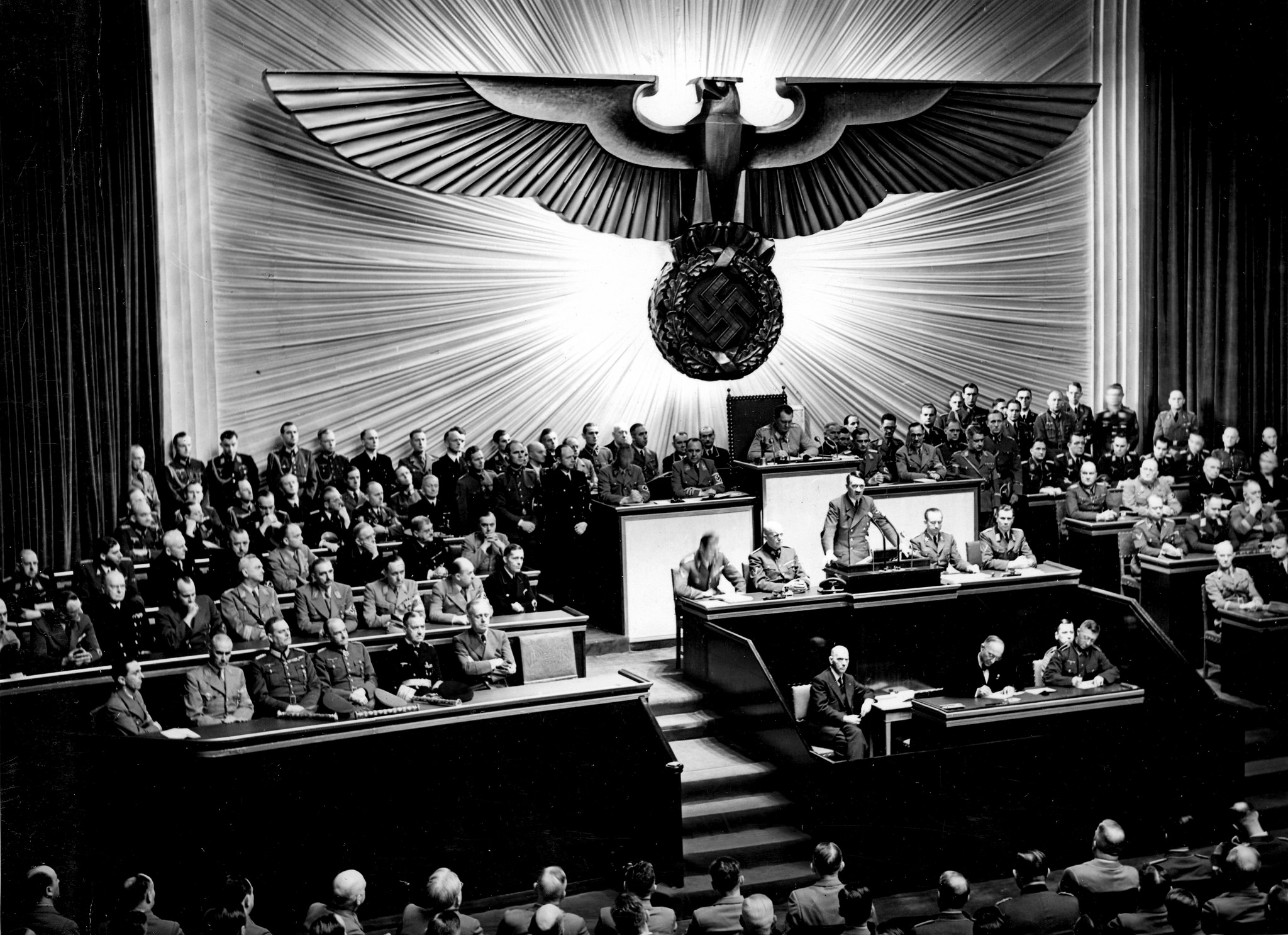
Adolf Hitler declaring war against the United States at the Reichstag, 11 December 1941

The Nazis used the provisions of the Reichstag Fire Decree to arrest all deputies from the Communist Party of Germany (KPD) and detain several deputies from the Social Democratic Party (SPD). Several other SPD deputies saw the writing on the wall and fled into exile. Ultimately, the Enabling Act passed by a margin of 444–94, with only the SPD voting against it. However, the session took place in such an intimidating atmosphere that even if all 81 KPD deputies and 120 SPD deputies had been present, the Enabling Act would have still passed by more than the two-thirds majority required.

Before the summer was out, all other parties had either been banned or intimidated into closing down (some were even intimidated into joining the Nazis), and the Nazi Party was the only legally permitted party in Germany – to all intents and purposes, Germany had become a one-party state with the passage of the Enabling Act. With the formal ban of opposition parties by the "Law Against the Formation of Parties" (14 July 1933), the provision of Article 48 that allowed the Reichstag to demand the cancellation of the emergency measures was effectively negated.

In the parliamentary elections of 12 November 1933, voters were presented with a single list from the Nazi Party under far-from-secret conditions (see below). The list carried with 92.1 percent of the vote. As a measure of the great care Hitler took to give his dictatorship the appearance of legal sanction, the Enabling Act was subsequently renewed by the Reichstag in 1937 and 1941.

The Reichstag only met 12 times between 1933 and 1939, and enacted only four laws — the "Law on the Reconstruction of the Reich" of 1934 (which turned Germany into a highly centralized state) and the three "Nuremberg Laws" of 1935. All passed unanimously. It would only meet eight more times after the start of the war. On 30 January 1939, in the aftermath of Kristallnacht and rising international tensions, Adolf Hitler made a speech proclaiming that a war would lead to the "annihilation of the Jewish race in Europe." On 1 September 1939 Hitler addressed the Reichstag, announcing the invasion of Poland and the beginning of World War II.

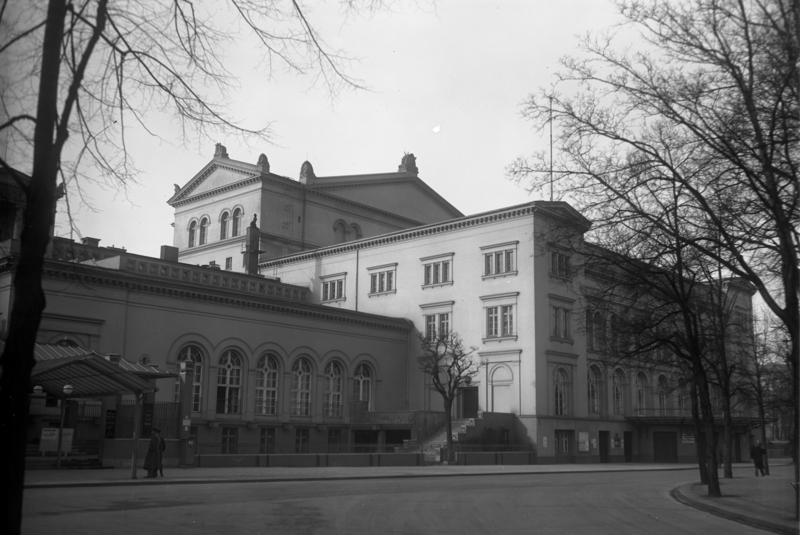
Kroll Opera House

=== Building ===
The original Reichstag building (German: Reichstagsgebäude) was unusable after the Reichstag fire, so the Kroll Opera House was modified into a legislative chamber and served as the location of all parliamentary sessions during the Third Reich. It was chosen both for its convenient location facing the Reichstag building and for its seating capacity. The Kroll Opera House was devastated by Allied bombing on 12 November 1943 (coincidentally, the tenth anniversary of the first Nazi Reichstag's election). It was then essentially destroyed in the Battle of Berlin in 1945.

== Elections and plebiscites in Nazi Germany ==
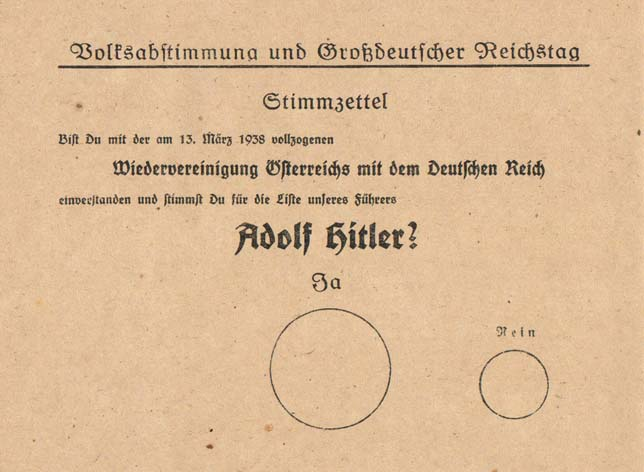
Referendum ballot in April 1938. It reads: "Do you agree with the reunification of Austria with the German Reich that was enacted on 13 March 1938, and do you vote for the party of our leader Adolf Hitler?" The large circle is labelled "Yes", the smaller "No".

The federal election in March 1933 was the last all-German election prior to World War II that was competitive. From then on, while elections were still held, voters were presented with a single list comprising Nazis and "guests" of the party. These "guests", however, fully supported Hitler in any event. Elections during this time were not secret; voters were often threatened with severe reprisals if they failed to vote or dared to vote no. Under the circumstances, the Nazi list carried with well over 90 percent of the vote each time.

Until enactment of the Nuremberg Laws in 1935, Jews, Poles and other ethnic minorities still held nominal citizenship rights. Not only were they allowed to vote, but in districts known to have large populations of minorities the Nazis often abstained from engaging in tactics used elsewhere to compel the electorate to vote in favour of the regime. In essence, the Nazis tacitly encouraged minorities to vote against them so that their propaganda could cite the relatively unfavourable results in districts known to have large minority populations as proof of disloyalty to the Reich. Following the enactment of the Nuremberg Laws, Jews and other ethnic minorities were excluded from the electoral process altogether and the number of negative and invalid votes recorded fell dramatically – from more than five million in the referendum held in 1934 to barely half a million in the vote held in 1936.

Of the three elections held during this period, only the first was held independently. The other two were held alongside special referendums. The most famous of these was the plebiscite on the Anschluss with Austria in 1938. That vote officially recorded a 99.7% "yes". Following the Anschluss, the Reichstag became the Großdeutsche Reichstag (roughly translated the Greater German Reich).

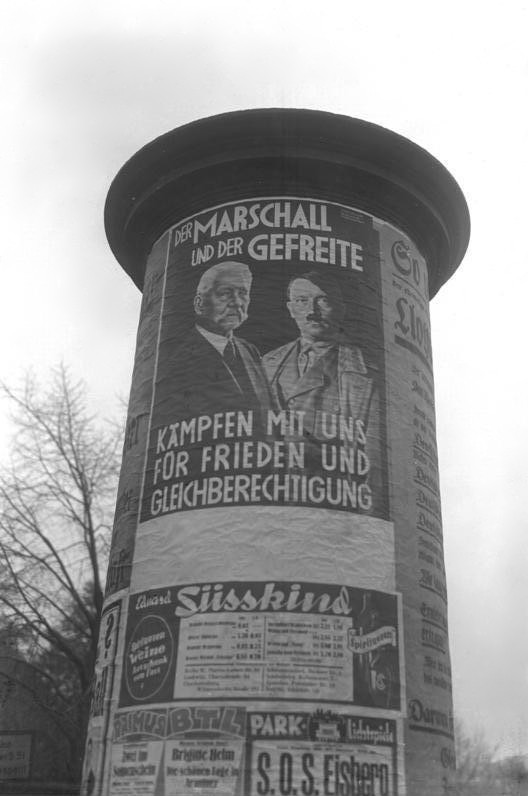
Election poster for Hindenburg and Hitler in November 1933. It reads: "The Marshal and the Corporal fight with us for peace and equal rights"

In accordance with the provisions of the Weimar Republic electoral law of 1933, one seat was granted for each block of 60,000 votes. Because voter turnout was very high, and also because of new territories added to the Reich, and finally because the voting age was lowered (a compensatory measure adopted prior to the 1936 election to prevent the electorate from shrinking in size as a consequence of the Nuremberg Laws), the Reichstag grew to significantly greater and greater proportions. Finally, there were 855 deputies; Adolf Hitler was No. 433, elected to the Reichstag constituency 24 Upper Bavaria – Swabia.

- 1933, 5 March: General parliamentary elections immediately following the Seizure of Power. Six days before the scheduled election date, the German parliament building burned in the Reichstag fire. Opposition parties were thwarted in their campaigns. The Nazi Party won 33 of the 35 direct seats from parliamentary districts and 43.9% of the overall vote, giving the Nazis together with the DNVP (8.0% of the votes) a slight majority of seats.
- 1933, 12 November: Parliamentary elections and referendum on the withdrawal of Germany from the League of Nations. All Reichstag delegates are now Nazi Party members or sympathizers. According to formal results, 92% of the voters approved the referendum proposal.
- 1934, 19 August: Special Plebiscite to retrospectively approve Adolf Hitler's assumption of the powers of the President, following the death of Paul von Hindenburg. 88.1% of the voters voted yes.
- 1936, 29 March: General parliamentary elections and referendum retrospectively approving the Remilitarization of the Rhineland. The election and the Rhineland occupation were combined in a single question.
- 1938, 10 April: General parliamentary elections and referendum retrospectively approving the annexation of Austria Anschluss. Elected to serve for a four-year term beginning in 1939, it convened for the last time in early 1942.
- 1938, 4 December: Parliamentary by-election for newly acquired territory of Sudetenland. Like the previous occasions, the Nazis won all seats in this last election under their rule.

== Last session ==
The Reichstag convened for the last time in the Kroll Opera House on 26 April 1942. It unanimously passed a decree proclaiming Hitler "Supreme Judge of the German People", officially allowing him to override the judiciary and administration in all matters. Any last remnants of the privileges of the Reichstag's members were removed and the Führer became de jure the final decision-maker, with the power of life and death over every German citizen. In practice, this merely legitimized a situation that had been in place since 1933. For all intents and purposes, this extended the provisions of the Enabling Act indefinitely.

On 25 January 1943, five days before the expiration of the current Reichstag's term of office, the inauguration of a new body was postponed for another electoral term until 30 January 1947. This was to avoid holding elections while the war was still under way. Because of Germany's defeat in the war, the 1938 elections were the last ever for the German Reichstag, and would be the last all-German elections until the first elections for a reunified Germany in 1990.

== See also ==
- Bundestag
- Guests of the Nazi Party Faction in the Reichstag
- List of Reichstag deputies in the Third Reich (4th electoral term)
- Reichstag (German Empire)
- Reichstag (Weimar Republic)
- Volkskammer
- Weimar National Assembly
