= November 1933 German parliamentary election =

- 12 November 1933

All 661 seats in the Reichstag 331 seats needed for a majority
- Registered: 45,178,701 (▲1.1%)
- Turnout: 95.3% (▲6.6pp)
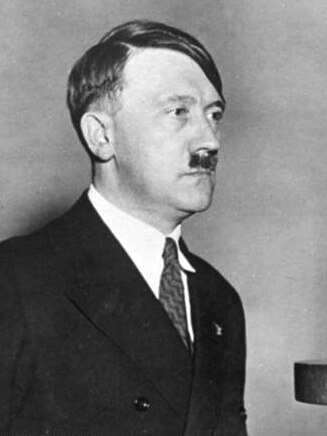
	Majority party
Leader	Adolf Hitler
Party	NSDAP
Last election	43.9%, 288 seats
Seats won	661
Seat change	▲373
Popular vote	39,655,224
Percentage	92.1%
Swing	▲48.2 pp
Government before election
Hitler cabinet
NSDAP
Government after election
Hitler cabinet
NSDAP

Parliamentary elections were held in Germany on 12 November 1933. They were the first since the Nazi Party seized complete power with the enactment of the Enabling Act in March. All opposition parties had been banned by the Law Against the Formation of Parties (14 July 1933), and voters were presented with a single list containing Nazis and 22 non-party "guests" (Gäste) of the Nazi Party. These "guests", who included the likes of Alfred Hugenberg, still fully supported the regime of Adolf Hitler in any event.

This election set the tone for all future elections and referendums held during the Nazi era. Official results indicated that 92 percent of voters approved the Nazi list, with a recorded turnout of 96 percent. However, the vote was conducted under far-from-secret circumstances; many citizens feared that voting "no" would be detected and severely punished. By this point, with the Gleichschaltung in full swing and totalitarianism tightening its grip, voters in certain communities faced explicit threats of reprisal if they dared to dissent or even if they simply failed to vote at all. Nonetheless, roughly 3.4 million voters defiantly submitted negative or invalid ballots.

By November 1933, the Nazi government had already established a concentration camp system, although camp inmates retained the right to vote. In several camps the Nazi list was endorsed by a large majority of voters and The Guardian reported that this meant an amnesty was considered likely. The elections were held on the same day as a separate referendum on Hitler's decision to withdraw Germany from the League of Nations, which passed with similar numbers. The new Reichstag, exclusively composed of NSDAP members and sympathisers, convened on 12 December to elect a Presidium headed by President of the Reichstag Hermann Göring.

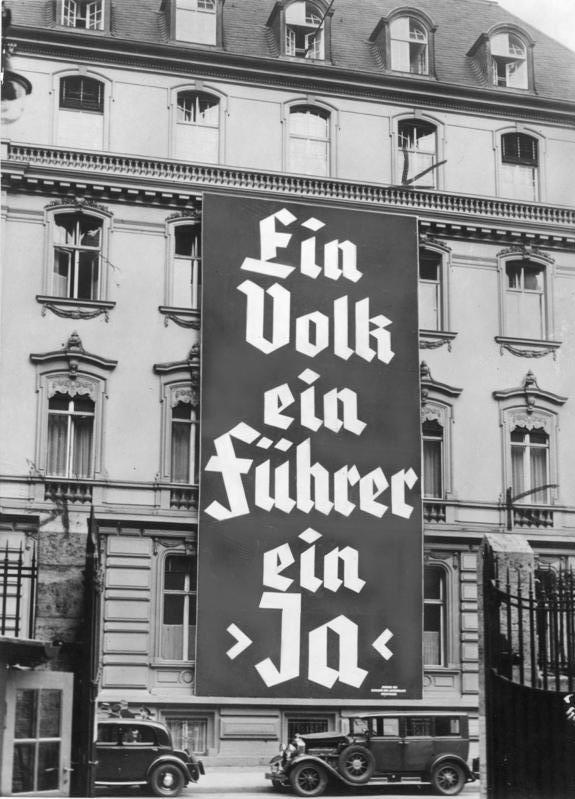
Election poster with the slogan One People, One Leader, One "Yes"

== Results ==
Party	Votes	%	Seats
Nazi Party and guests	39,655,224	92.11	661
Against	3,398,249	7.89	–
Invalid/blank votes	3,398,249	7.89	–
Total votes	43,053,473	100.00	661
Registered voters/turnout	45,178,701	95.30	–
Source: Nohlen & Stöver

== Aftermath ==
The election liquidated what was left of Weimar democracy and reduced the Reichstag to a mere stage for Hitler's speeches. It only met sporadically until the end of World War II, held no debates and enacted only a few laws, while the Reichsrat was abolished in February 1934 by the Law on the Abolition of the Reichsrat.

In August 1934, Hindenburg died, and Hitler seized the president's powers for himself in accordance with a law passed the previous day, an action confirmed via a referendum later that month, removing the last obstacle that prevented Hitler from obtaining absolute power and establishing a totalitarian state.

== See also ==
- Guests of the Nazi Party Faction in the Reichstag
- List of Reichstag deputies in the Third Reich (2nd electoral term)
