= Walter Simons =

German lawyer and politician (1861-1937)

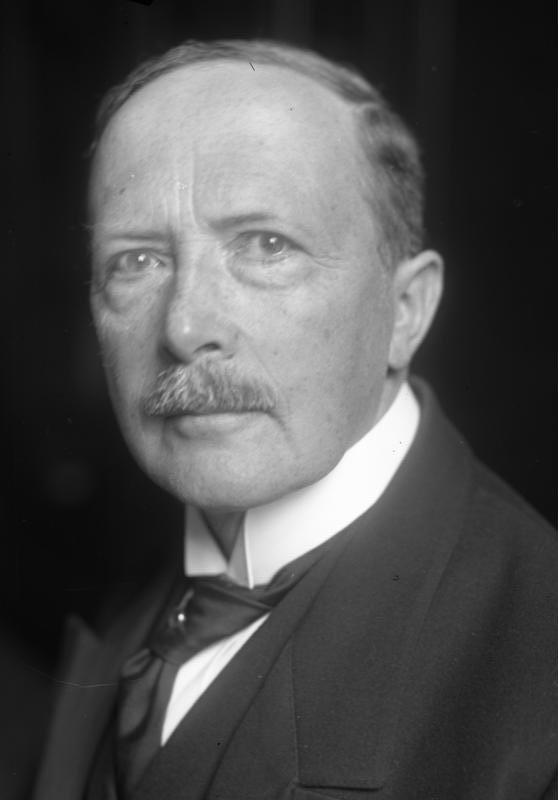
- Simons in 1931

President of Germany
- Acting; 12 March 1925 – 12 May 1925
- Chancellor: Hans Luther
- Preceded by: Hans Luther (acting)
- Succeeded by: Paul von Hindenburg

President of the Reichsgericht
- In office 16 October 1922 – 1 April 1929
- Appointed by: Friedrich Ebert
- Preceded by: Heinrich Delbrück
- Succeeded by: Erwin Bumke

Minister for Foreign Affairs
- In office 25 June 1920 – 10 May 1921
- Chancellor: Constantin Fehrenbach
- Preceded by: Adolf Köster
- Succeeded by: Friedrich Rosen

Personal details
- Born: 24 September 1861 Elberfeld, Kingdom of Prussia, German Confederation
- Died: 14 July 1937 (aged 75) Potsdam, Brandenburg, Nazi Germany
- Resting place: Wilmersdorfer Waldfriedhof
- Party: Independent
- Spouse: Erna Rühle (m. 1890)
- Children: 7
- Relatives: Gerhard Simons (grandson)
- Education: University of Strasbourg; Leipzig University; University of Bonn
- Profession: Lawyer
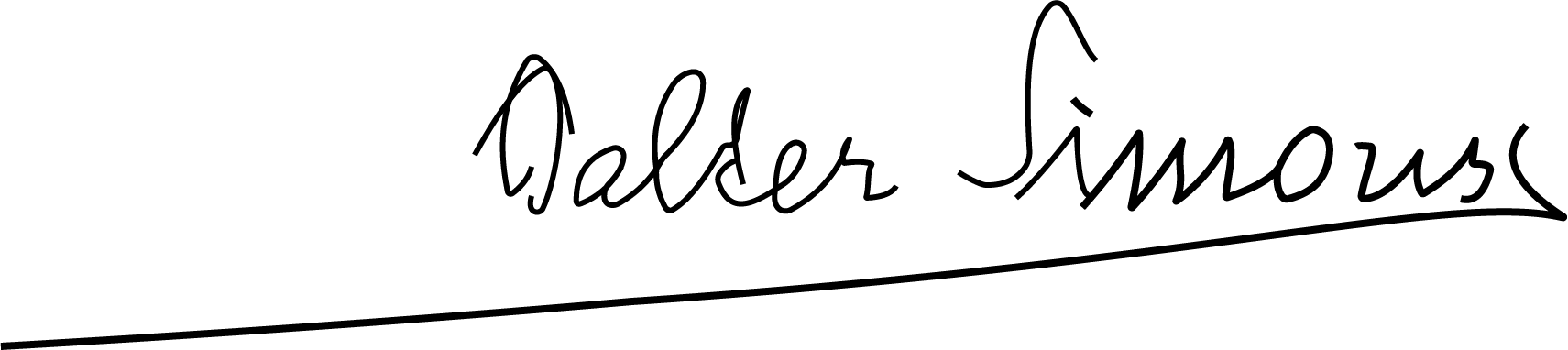
- Signature

Walter Simons (24 September 1861 – 14 July 1937) was a German lawyer and politician. He was Foreign Minister of the Weimar Republic in 1920–1921 and served as president of the Reichsgericht from 1922 to 1929.

== Early life ==
Walter Simons was born on 24 September 1861 at Elberfeld (today Wuppertal) in the Prussian Rhine Province. His family were Huguenots who had come to the Rhineland after 1685. Walter's father was Ludwig Simons (1831–1905), a silk manufacturer. His mother was Helene Simons née Kyllmann (1842–1916).

Walter Simons attended a Gymnasium at Elberfeld and attained the Abitur in 1879. He went on to study law, economics and history at Strasbourg, Leipzig and Bonn. Rudolph Sohm had an important influence on him. In 1882, he passed the Referendarexamen and then served in the military. In 1888, he passed the Prussian Assessorexamen and then served as an assistant judge at Bonn and Solingen. He married Erna Rühle (1870–1954) at Solingen in 1890. They had three sons and four daughters.

== Civil service career ==
In 1893, Simons became Amtsgerichtsrat (judge) at Velbert. From 1897 to 1905, he was Landgerichtsrat at the Gemeinschaftliche Landgericht of Thuringia at Meiningen. In 1905, he went to Kiel, where he worked at the Oberlandesgericht, but left that same year to work as a clerk at the Reichsjustizamt at Berlin.

In 1907, Simons was promoted to Geheimer Regierungsrat (Privy Councillor) and Vortragender Rat (Speaker Council), responsible for international law. He represented the Reich at several international conferences and in 1911 moved to the Auswärtige Amt (Foreign Office) where he became Geheimer Legationsrat (Privy Legation Councillor) and Justitiar (Justice). In 1917, he was promoted to Wirklicher Geheimer Rat (Real Privy Council) and in 1918 participated in the negotiations at Brest-Litovsk. On 15 October 1918, shortly before the German Revolution of 1918-1919, Chancellor Max von Baden made him advisor to the Reichskanzler (Reich Chancellor) on issues of international law. He was close to the chancellor and was an important influence on the reform of the German constitution of 1871 known as the Oktoberreformen which strengthened the position of the Reichstag. He also worked on plans to have Wilhelm II resign in favour of a relative and participated in negotiations at the Reichsamt des Innern (Interior Ministry) about a new constitution.

In November 1918, Simons became Ministerialdirektor (Ministerial Director) and head of the law department at the Foreign Office. In 1919, as a close staff member of Foreign Minister Ulrich von Brockdorff-Rantzau, he was Unterstaatssekretär (Undersecretary of State) and Generalkommissar (Commissioner General) of the German delegation at Versailles.

Since he opposed the German signature of the Treaty, Simons resigned his post (einstweiliger Ruhestand) (temporary retirement) and became managing director of the Reichsverband der deutschen Industrie (the industrialists' association). In 1920, he resigned from the Pan-German League where he had served on the executive board in 1903–1907.

== Political career ==
Simons, who never joined a political party, served from June 1920 to May 1921 in the Fehrenbach cabinet as Foreign Minister and was the Reich representative at the Spa Conference and the London Conference of 1921.

From January to May 1922, Simons was a delegate at the German-Polish negotiations on Upper Silesia. In 1922, he founded the so-called SeSiSo-Kreis named after co-founders Hans von Seeckt, Simons and Wilhelm Solf, a salon meeting at the Hotel Kaiserhof in Berlin.

In the 1920s, Simons also chaired the family trust of the Moltke family, which included ownership of the Kreisau estate that was later to give its name to the Kreisau Circle of dissidents against Nazi rule.

== President of the Reichsgericht ==
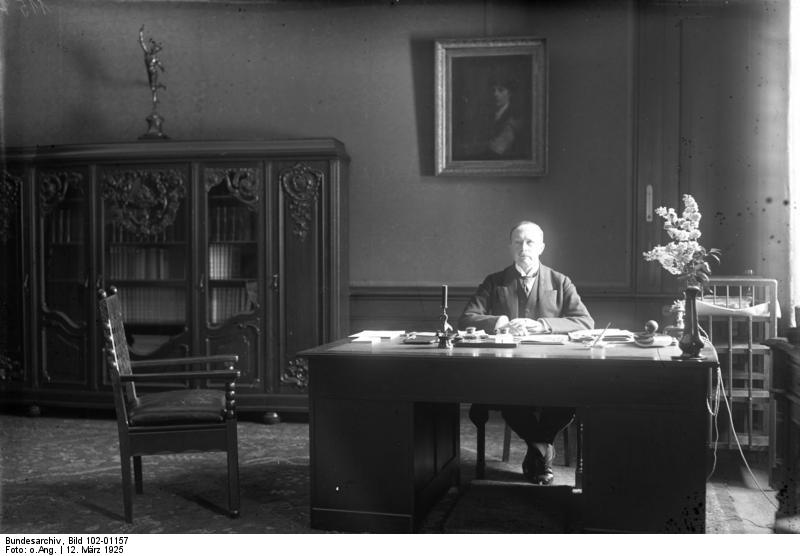
Simons at the Palace of the Reich President in 1925

On 1 October 1922, Simons was appointed president of the Reichsgericht at Leipzig on the suggestion of Reichspräsident Friedrich Ebert. After Ebert's death in 1925, Simons temporarily served as acting head of state before the swearing in of Paul von Hindenburg.

Simons himself was suggested as a potential candidate for Reichspräsident after the first round of voting had failed to yield an outright winner. However, he refused to be nominated.

From 1922 to 1926, Simons was president of the I. Zivilsenat and from 1926 to 1929 president of the III. Strafsenat. He was also president of the State Court for the German Reich. He was attacked by the Social Democratic Party of Germany (SPD) for his criticism of judges being members of the SPD or the Republikanischen Richterbund, an association of judges which was close to the party. Simons opposed a separate Reichsverwaltungsgericht (administrative court) and was highly critical of the Kartellgericht established in 1923 at the Reichswirtschaftsgericht, accusing it of inappropriate hostility towards cartels.

After a conflict with President Hindenburg and the government of Hermann Müller concerning the appointment of members of the board of directors at the Reichsbahn in 1928, Simons resigned in 1929.

== Further career ==
Since 1926, Simons had been an honorary professor of international law at the Leipzig University and president of the Deutsche Gesellschaft für Völkerrecht (German Society for International Law). He was also active and influential in the Lutheran church, as the first non-theologian to be president of the Evangelisch-sozialer Kongresses (Evangelical Social Congress, 1925–1936) and member of the Deutsche Evangelischer Kirchenausschuss (German Evangelical Church Commission, after 1930). In 1920, he co-founded the Deutsche Hochschule für Politik in Berlin (and was a long-standing board member). In 1929/1930, Simons was appointed as a teacher of national and international law at the Handelshochschule Berlin.

After the Nazis seized power in 1933, Simons was active only in the church and in the Neue Bachgesellschaft honouring Johann Sebastian Bach (where he had been president since 1930). Some public statements, such as on the occasion of the Bach anniversary in 1935 and late publications on international law, indicate some support for the policies of the NSDAP and for German as well as Italian foreign policy (in the Abyssinia Crisis) and for the Falange in Spain.

Simons died at Neubabelsberg/Potsdam on 14 July 1937. He was the father of Hans Simons, father-in-law of Ernst Rudolf Huber and grandfather of Wolfgang Huber. Simons is buried at the Wilmersdorfer Waldfriedhof.

== Awards ==
- 1931 : Adlerschild des Deutschen Reiches (Eagle Shield of the German Reich).

== Selected works ==
- Christentum und Verbrechen (Christianity and Crime), 1925;
- Religion und Recht (Religion and Law) (Lectures held at Uppsala University), Berlin-Tempelhof 1936;
- Kirchenvolk und Staatsvolk, Leipziger rechtswissenschaftliche Studien Bd. 100, Leipzig 1937.

Political offices
Preceded by Adolf Köster	Minister of Foreign Affairs; 1920 – 1921	Succeeded by Friedrich Rosen
Preceded by Hans Luther; Acting	Acting head of state of Germany; 1925	Succeeded by Paul von Hindenburg
Legal offices
Preceded by Heinrich Delbrück	President of the Reichsgericht; 1922 – 1929	Succeeded by Erwin Bumke
