= Decree of the Reich President for the Protection of the German People =

The Decree of the Reich President for the Protection of the German People (German: Verordnung des Reichspräsidenten zum Schutze des Deutschen Volkes) issued on February 4, 1933 by German President Paul von Hindenburg severely limited press freedoms and gave the Nazi Party far-reaching powers.
