= Erwin Bumke =

German Nazi politician

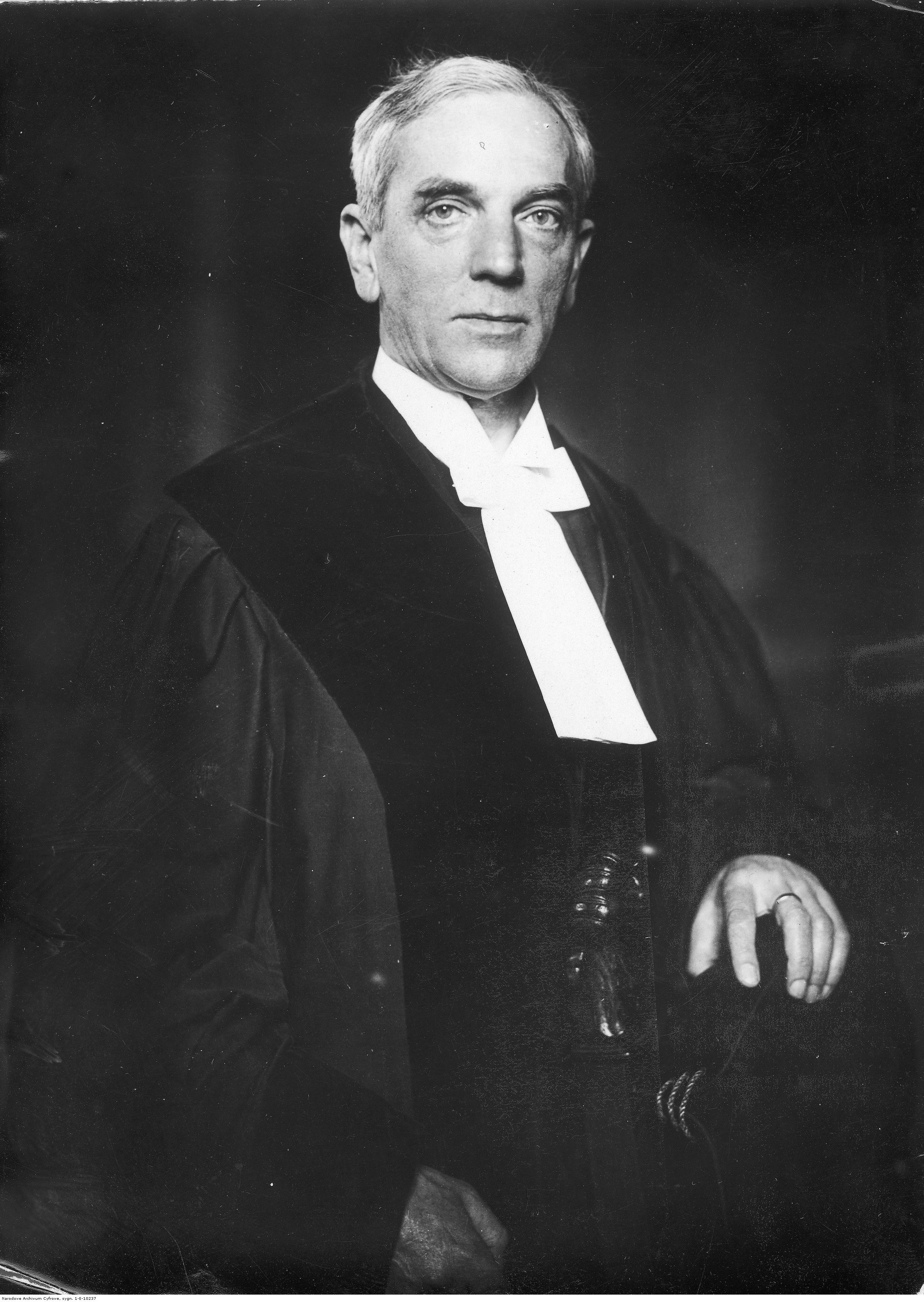

President of the Reichsgericht
- In office 1 April 1929 – 20 April 1945
- Preceded by: Walter Simons
- Succeeded by: Office abolished

Personal details
- Born: Erwin Konrad Eduard Bumke; 7 July 1874 Stolp, Province of Pomerania, Kingdom of Prussia, German Empire
- Died: 20 April 1945 (aged 70) Leipzig, Allied-occupied Germany
- Cause of death: Suicide
- Party: Nazi Party (from 1937)
- Other political affiliations: German National People's Party (1919–1929)
- Spouse: Eva von Merkatz (m. 1907)
- Relations: Oswald Bumke (brother)
- Children: 2
- Education: Law
- Alma mater: University of Freiburg; Leipzig University; Ludwig-Maximilians-Universität München; Humboldt University of Berlin; University of Greifswald
- Profession: Judge
- Awards: Golden Party Badge

Military service
- Allegiance: German Empire
- Branch/service: Imperial German Army
- Rank: Hauptmann
- Battles/wars: World War I

Erwin Konrad Eduard Bumke (7 July 1874 – 20 April 1945) was the last president of the Reichsgericht, the supreme civil and criminal court of the German Reich, serving from 1929 to 1945. As such, according to the Weimar Constitution, he should have become acting President of Germany upon the death of Paul von Hindenburg in August 1934, and thus the acting Head of State of Nazi Germany. The Law Concerning the Head of State of the German Reich, passed by the Hitler cabinet, unconstitutionally prevented that by combining the presidency with the chancellorship, making Adolf Hitler the undisputed ruler of Germany. Following the Nazi takeover, Bumke extensively cooperated with the Party in establishing a Verbrecherstaat ('criminal state').

== Life ==
Born in the small town of Stolp (today, Słupsk, Poland) in the Prussian Province of Pomerania, he had a family that was middle class. His father was a doctor and his mother a factory owner's daughter. His brother Oswald Bumke (1877–1950) became a noted psychiatrist.

After studying law at the University of Freiburg, Leipzig University, the Ludwig-Maximilians-Universität München, the Humboldt University of Berlin and the University of Greifswald, Bumke began his career as a judge in Essen. In 1907, he assumed an office in the 'Reichsjustizamt, the precursor of the later Reich Ministry of Justice. The same year, he married Eva von Merkatz (1873–1947), the aunt of the later Minister of Justice Hans-Joachim von Merkatz. The couple had two sons, both of whom were killed in World War II. Bumke himself served as an officer in World War I, achieving the rank of Hauptmann (Captain).

After the war, Bumke joined the German National People's Party (DNVP). He quickly rose to the head of Department II in the newly established Ministry of Justice, which was concerned with criminal law. He prepared, among other things, the Reichstag drafts for a new Strafgesetzbuch penal code in 1927, which never saw the light of day. In 1930, Bumke became president of the International Criminal Law and Prison Commission.

Upon the resignation of Walter Simons in 1929, Bumke was appointed as head of the Reichsgericht by President Paul von Hindenburg. On 25 October 1932, the court under Bumke's leadership, declared the temporary removal of the Prussian state ministers' authority by a Reichskommissar, enacted by emergency decree (see Preußenschlag), to be valid. According to an amendment to the Weimar Constitution passed in December 1932, Bumke should have become interim President if Hindenburg either died or was permanently incapacitated, holding the post until new elections. Indeed, the Nazis supported this amendment to allay concerns about Adolf Hitler taking the presidency in the event he ever became chancellor.

However, by 1934, Hitler saw this arrangement as a threat. He was well aware that the president's power to dismiss him was now the only check on his power. With the passage of the Enabling Act and the Nazi Party being declared the only legally permitted party, there was no other remedy by which he could be legally removed from office. Accordingly, when he learned that Hindenburg would likely be dead before the year was out, he began a concerted effort to make himself Hindenburg's successor. This culminated in the passage of the Law Concerning the Head of State of the German Reich, passed just hours before Hindenburg died on 2 August. It merged the offices of president and chancellor under the title of "Führer and Reich Chancellor," and conferred this title on Hitler. A referendum held on 19 August confirmed this move. All of these actions violated Article 2 of the Enabling Act, which stipulated that the president's rights and powers were to remain "unaffected" (or "undisturbed," depending on the translation). However, neither Bumke nor anyone else objected.

Along with several of his DNVP colleagues, such as Minister of Justice Franz Gürtner and State Secretary Franz Schlegelberger, Bumke retained his office after the Nazi seizure of power in January 1933 and was made responsible for co-ordinating jurisprudence in the Third Reich. In July 1933, he became a SS Patron Member. He joined the Nazi Party in 1937 and was awarded the Golden Party Badge the next year. Bumke became responsible for several unjust and racist verdicts. As presiding judge of the 3rd criminal division, he ruled under the Rassenschande paragraphs of the Nuremberg Laws. He also was involved in retroactively legalizing the "euthanasia" murders of the Aktion T4 programme in 1939–1941. His term in office was extended on a personal decree from Hitler in 1939.

During the last days of World War II, on 20 April 1945 (Hitler's birthday), two days after US Army forces entered Leipzig, Bumke committed suicide.

== Works ==
- Hat die erfüllte Resolutivbedingung dingliche Kraft?, Greifswald dissertation 1896
- Deutsches Gefängniswesen. Ein Handbuch, Berlin 1928.
- Gerichtsverfassungsgesetz und Strafprozeßordnung. Mit Nebengesetzen in der vom 13. Januar 1927 geltenden Fassung; Textausgabe mit einer Einführung in die Vorschriften der Novelle vom 27. Dezember 1926, Berlin 1927.
- Zwei Entscheidungen zu Art. 48 der Reichsverfassung, Berlin 1932.
