= 1934 German head of state referendum =

Vote on Hitler taking power in Nazi Germany

1934 German referendum
- 19 August 1934
- The office of the national president is united with that of the national chancellor. In consequence, the former powers of the national president pass to the leader and national chancellor, Adolf Hitler. He appoints his deputy. Do you, German man, and you, German woman, approve of the arrangement made in this law?

Results
Choice	Votes	%
Yes	38,394,848	89.93%
No	4,300,370	10.07%
Valid votes	42,695,218	97.99%
Invalid or blank votes	873,668	2.01%
Total votes	43,568,886	100.00%
Registered voters/turnout	45,552,059	95.65%
- Results by electoral district

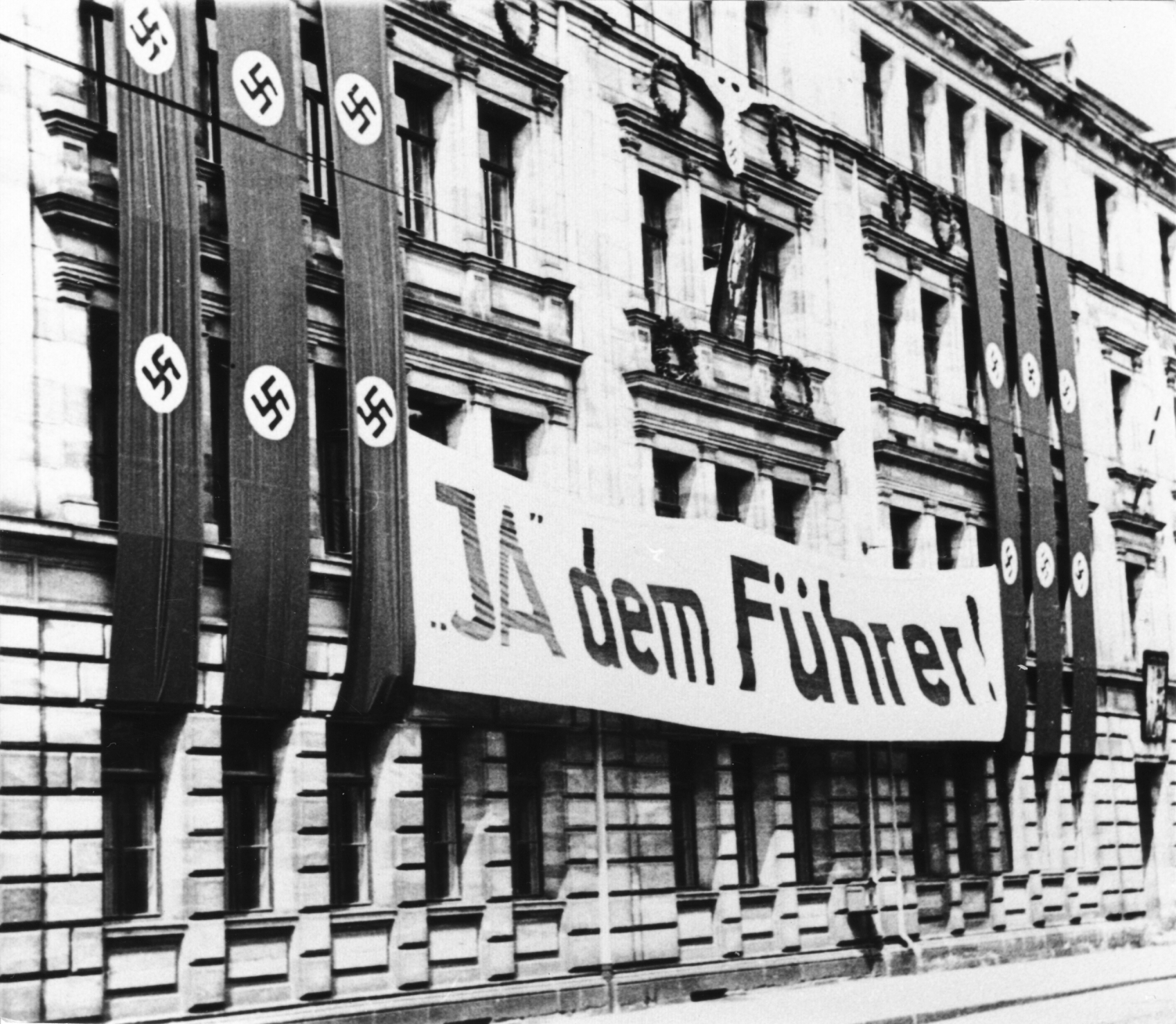
Banner with the campaign message "Yes to the Führer!" on a school building in Fürth

A referendum on merging the posts of Chancellor and President was held in Nazi Germany on 19 August 1934, seventeen days after the death of President Paul von Hindenburg. The German leadership sought to gain approval for Adolf Hitler's assumption of supreme power. The referendum was associated with widespread intimidation of voters and significant electoral fraud.

Hitler used the resultant large "yes" vote to claim public support to succeed Hindenburg as the de facto head of state of Germany, though he had assumed presidential powers in addition to his own powers as Chancellor immediately upon Hindenburg's death. The referendum was meant to legitimise that move.

== Background ==
=== Hitler's rise to power ===
Weimar president Paul von Hindenburg appointed Adolf Hitler as Chancellor on 30 January 1933. After his appointment, he wanted the Reichstag to pass an "enabling act" to allow his government to pass laws directly, without the support of the Reichstag. Lacking the two-thirds supermajority necessary to pass such an act, Hindenburg dissolved the Reichstag on 31 January. In the resulting election, the Nazis won 43.9% of the vote. Including his allies, Hitler enjoyed the support of 60% of the deputies, but needed the support of the Catholic Centre Party to reach the required threshold to pass the Enabling Act. After securing their support by promising to respect the rights of the Catholic Church, it passed 441–94. With its passage, Hitler had effectively become a dictator.

However, the president technically retained the ability to dismiss the chancellor. After all other parties were formally banned in July 1933, Hindenburg's power to dismiss Hitler was the only means by which Hitler could be legally dismissed, and thus the only check on his power. This fact was brought home to Hitler in the summer of 1934 when Hindenburg grew so outraged at escalating Nazi excesses that he threatened to sack Hitler and declare martial law unless Hitler acted immediately to end the tension. Hitler responded by ordering the Night of the Long Knives, in which several SA leaders, including Ernst Röhm, were murdered along with several of Hitler's other past rivals.

=== Elections in Nazi Germany ===
The Weimar Constitution allowed the President to refer legislation passed by the Reichstag to a referendum. A referendum would also be held if 10% of eligible voters proposed an initiative. On 14 July 1933, the German cabinet used the Enabling Act to pass the "Law concerning the Plebiscite", which permitted the cabinet to call a referendum on "questions of national policy" and "laws which the cabinet had enacted". While the Weimar provisions allowing for referendums were not explicitly repealed, subsequent legislation made it clear those provisions would not be used.

On 12 November 1933 the cabinet used this authority to hold a referendum on withdrawing from the League of Nations. Officially, 95.1% of voters supported withdrawal on a turnout of 96.3%. While there was undoubtedly considerable pressure to vote in the affirmative, historians Hedwig Richter and Ralph Jessen argue that "fraud and manipulation were not so prevalent as to fundamentally distort the results". According to them "This has been repeatedly confirmed by regional studies of the procedure of actual elections and by the records of private individuals" for elections in Nazi Germany (excluding 1936), although there were "repeated cases of manipulation and fraud" and "political terror".

=== The referendum ===
Hitler had known as early as April 1934 that Hindenburg would likely be dead by the end of the year. He spent much of the runup working to get the armed forces to support him as Hindenburg's successor. On 1 August, with Hindenburg's death imminent, the cabinet passed the Law Concerning the Head of State of the German Reich. It stipulated that upon Hindenburg's death, the offices of President (head of state) and Chancellor (head of government) would be merged. Hindenburg died the following day. Three hours later, Hitler issued a decree announcing that he had assumed the president's powers in accordance with the new law. He also called for a referendum to approve his actions. He publicly argued that the presidency had become so linked with Hindenburg that the title should not be used again.

== Conduct ==
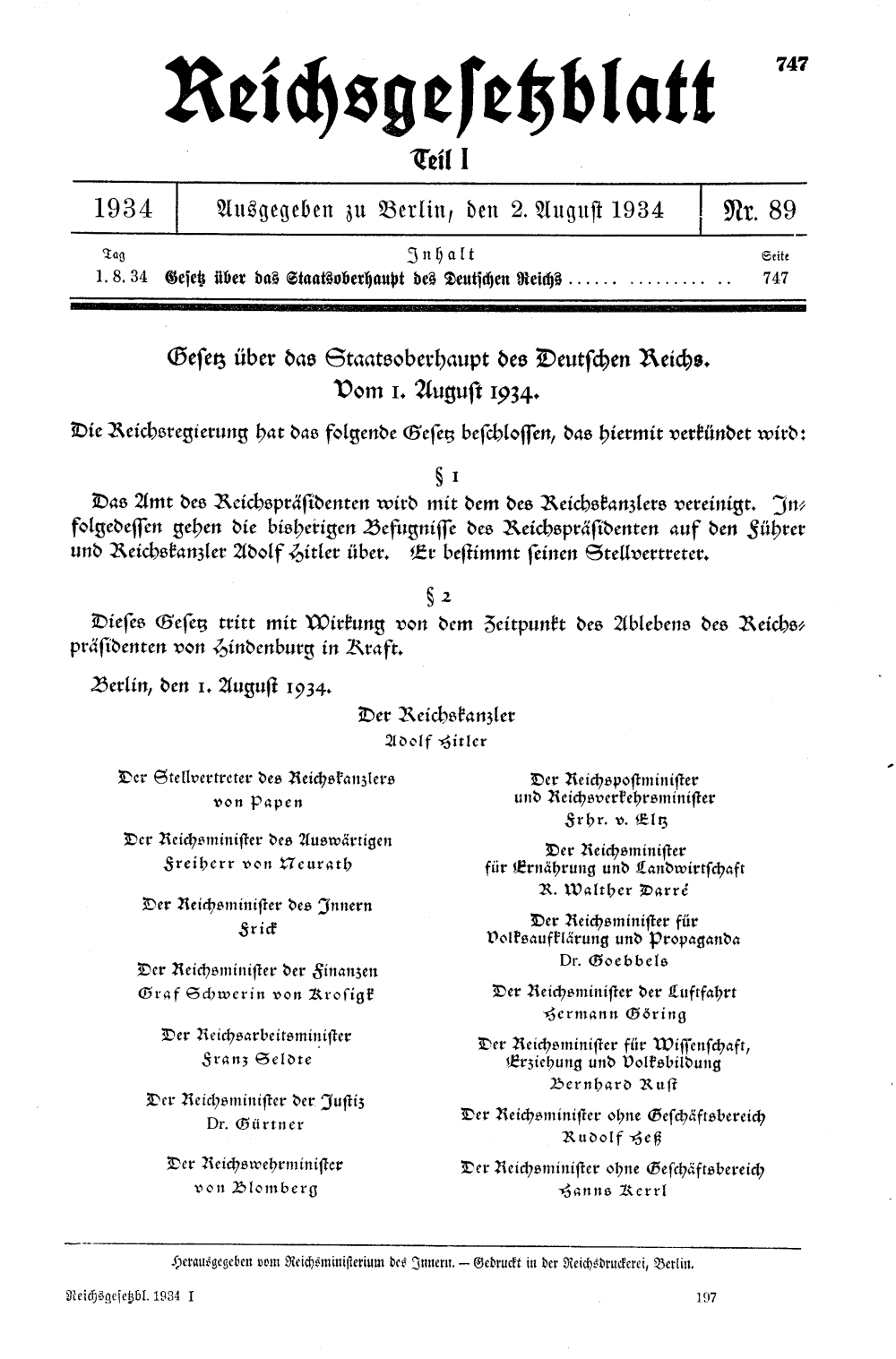
The Law on the Head of State of the German Reich of 1 August

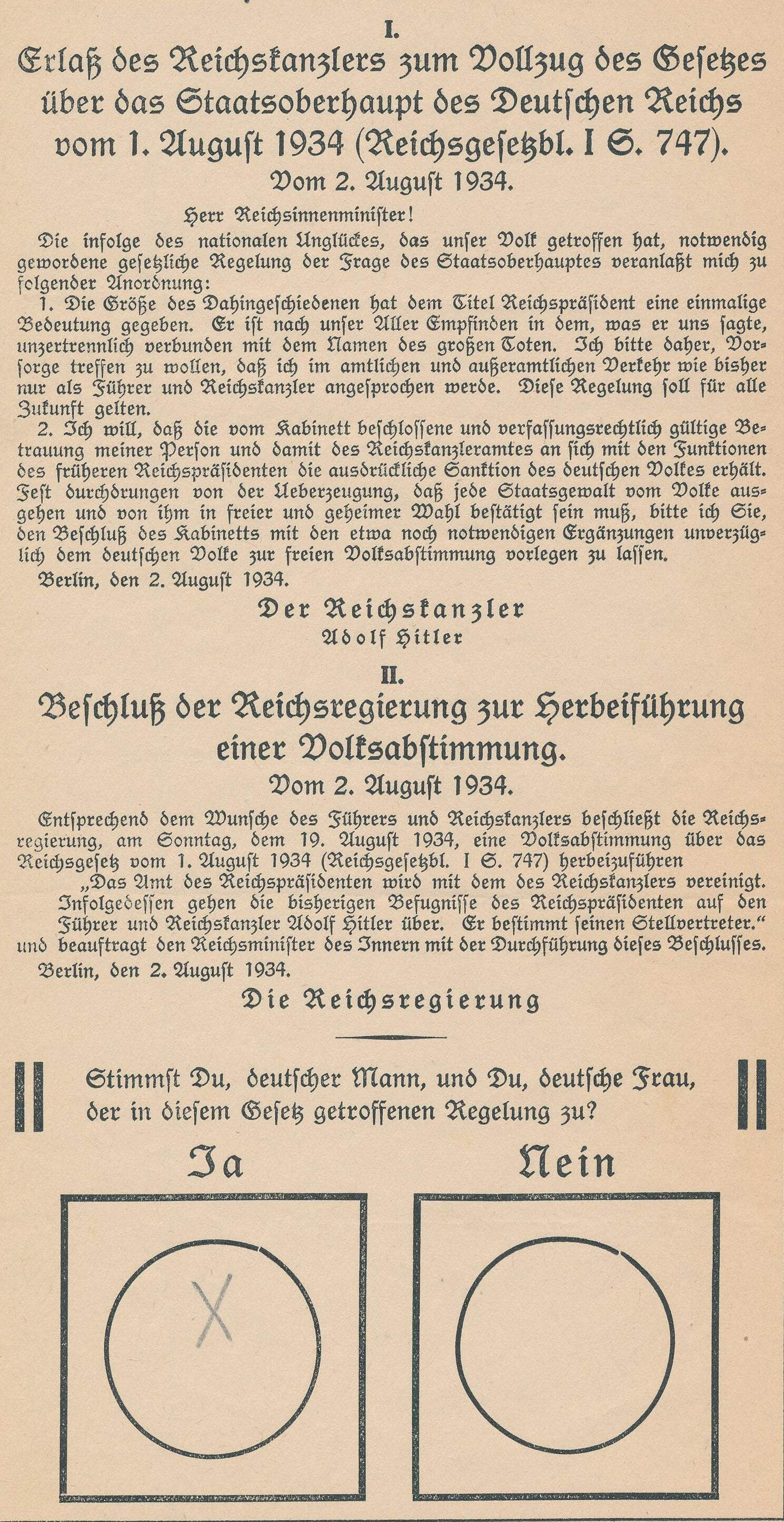
Ballot marked as "ja" ("yes")

On 19 August 1934 voters were asked the question:

The office of the national president is united with that of the national chancellor. In consequence, the former powers of the national president pass to the leader and national chancellor, Adolf Hitler. He appoints his deputy.
Do you, German man, and you, German woman, approve of the arrangement made in this law?

The government used widespread intimidation and electoral fraud to secure a large "yes" vote. This included stationing storm troopers at polling stations and forcibly escorting clubs and societies to polling stations. In some places, polling booths were removed, or banners reading "only traitors enter here" hung over the entrances to discourage secret voting. In addition, many ballot papers were pre-marked with "yes" votes, spoiled ballot papers were frequently counted as having been "yes" votes and many "no" votes were recorded to have been in favour of the referendum question. The extent of the fraud meant that in some areas, the number of votes recorded to have been cast was greater than the number of people able to vote.

The relative lack of support in Hamburg in 1933 prompted Hitler to declare a "virtual national holiday" on 17 August 1934 so that he could address the German people directly over the 4.3 million registered radio sets.

The referendum itself, as well as all efforts to make Hitler head of state, violated the Enabling Act. Although that act gave the government—in practice, Hitler—the right to pass laws that "may deviate from the constitution", it stated that the president's powers were to remain "undisturbed", which has long been interpreted to forbid any attempt to tamper with the presidency. The constitution had also previously been amended in 1932 to make the president of the High Court of Justice (Erwin Bumke in 1934), not the chancellor, first in the line of succession to the presidency and even then only on an interim basis until fresh elections.

== Results ==
Officially, "yes" easily won with slightly less than 90% of the vote. Support for merging the offices of president and chancellor was greatest in East Prussia, where official figures show that 96% voted in favour. Support was lowest in urban districts. It was least strong in Hamburg, where just under 80% voted affirmatively (20.4% against). In Berlin, 18.5% of votes were negative and every district reported a negative vote share greater than 10%. In the former Communist stronghold of Wedding, just under 20% voted against. Overall support for the government was lower than in the referendum of 12 November 1933, when the government had received support from 95.1% of the total electorate: the percentage of the population voting against the government had more than doubled.

Results of the referendum
Choice	Votes	%
For	38,394,848	89.93
Against	4,300,370	10.07
Total	42,695,218	100.00
Valid votes	42,695,218	97.99
Invalid/blank votes	873,668	2.01
Total votes	43,568,886	100.00
Registered voters/turnout	45,552,059	95.65
Source: Nohlen & Stöver 2010, p. 770

== Reactions and aftermath ==
The referendum did not change the status quo; Hitler had already assumed the presidency upon the death of Hindenburg. Some in the Nazi leadership were disappointed by the results of the referendum. For instance, Joseph Goebbels's diary entry for 22 August speaks of the referendum as a failure: "Initial results: very bad. Then better. Finally over 38 million for the Führer. I expected more. The Catholics failed Rosenberg!" Nevertheless, historian Ian Kershaw argues that even after accounting for the manipulation of the voting process, the results "reflected the fact that Hitler had the backing, much of it fervently enthusiastic, of the great majority of the German people."

Victor Klemperer was born into a Jewish family but converted to Protestantism in 1912. Known for his opposition to the Nazi regime, he reflected on the mood of the time in his diary: "One third said Yes out of fear, one third out of intoxication, one third out of fear and intoxication. And Eva [his wife] and I also simply put a cross at No out of a certain degree of despair and not without fear." He added that "Hitler is the undisputed victor" despite "[t]he five million No and spoiled ballots". Historian Sidney Fay said that the increase in the opposition vote relative to the 1933 referendum was expected due to conflicts with the church, economic difficulties, and the then-recent Night of the Long Knives (a purge on 30 June 1934 that ensured the army would continue to support Hitler's regime).
