= Ministry of the Royal Family (Prussia) =

Prussian ministry (1819–1918)

In Prussia, the Minister of the Royal Family was responsible for the administration of the crown estates and the safeguarding of other royal rights.

== Legal Status ==
Until the March Revolution, the Ministry of the Royal Family was officially part of the State Ministry. Due to its special responsibilities, the respective office holders rarely participated in government meetings. After 1848, the Minister of the Royal Family was formally a court authority associated with the Office of the Chief Chamberlain. It was no longer part of the Prussian State Ministry.

== Responsibilities ==
The ministry was responsible for, among other things, the Herald's Office, the archives of the royal house, the administration of family estates, and the family trust. In addition to the civilian secret cabinet, it also served to handle clemency cases and was responsible for carrying out royal orders that were not the responsibility of the government.

== Ministers of the Royal Family ==
Name	Term Began	Term Ended	Image
Wilhelm zu Sayn-Wittgenstein-Hohenstein	1819	1851	Ludwig von Massow Alexander von Schleinitz Otto zu Stolberg-Wernigerode
Ludwig von Massow (interim)	1851	1851	Ludwig von Massow Alexander von Schleinitz Otto zu Stolberg-Wernigerode
Anton Graf zu Stolberg-Wernigerode	1851	1854	Ludwig von Massow Alexander von Schleinitz Otto zu Stolberg-Wernigerode
Ludwig von Massow (interim)	1854	1856	Ludwig von Massow Alexander von Schleinitz Otto zu Stolberg-Wernigerode
Ludwig von Massow	1856	1858	Ludwig von Massow Alexander von Schleinitz Otto zu Stolberg-Wernigerode
Alexander von Schleinitz	1861	1885	Ludwig von Massow Alexander von Schleinitz Otto zu Stolberg-Wernigerode
Otto zu Stolberg-Wernigerode	1885	1888	Ludwig von Massow Alexander von Schleinitz Otto zu Stolberg-Wernigerode
Wilhelm von Wedel	1888	1907	Ludwig von Massow Alexander von Schleinitz Otto zu Stolberg-Wernigerode
August zu Eulenburg	1907	1918	Ludwig von Massow Alexander von Schleinitz Otto zu Stolberg-Wernigerode

== Residences ==
Originally, the minister resided in the Berlin City Palace, and the administration was temporarily distributed among other royal or other properties. With the purchase of the palace at Wilhelmstraße 73 in 1858, the ministry acquired a single office building for the first time.
