= Oswald Bumke =

German psychiatrist and neurologist

- Born: 25 September 1877; Stolp, Pomerania
- Died: 5 January 1950 (aged 72); Munich
- Scientific career
- Fields: Psychiatry, neurology

Oswald Bumke (25 September 1877 – 5 January 1950) was a German psychiatrist and neurologist.

== Family ==
Bumke's mother, Emma (1850–1914), was the daughter of a factory owner. His father, Albert Bumke (1843-1892), was a physician and assistant to Rudolf Virchow but did not pursue a scientific career. He died when Oswald was 15 years old.

He had three brothers, one of whom was born without a left hand and died in a swimming accident, another brother, Erwin Bumke, became a noted jurist.

== Career ==
Bumke studied at the University of Freiburg, Leipzig University, Ludwig-Maximilians-Universität München, and Martin Luther University Halle-Wittenberg. On 1 August 1901, he became an assistant physician at the psychiatric clinic and mental hospital in Freiburg, working under the noted psychiatrist Alfred Hoche, one of the most vocal critics of the "natural disease entities" classification of Emil Kraepelin. As is the custom in German universities, in order to be eligible for a professorship Bumke researched and wrote a second thesis or Habilitation. Published in 1904, Bumke's extensive literature review of the evidence for eye-pupil abnormalities in neurological and psychiatric conditions was an attempt to identify potential biomarkers that might be of diagnostic and research significance. Research on eye-movement abnormalities and the abnormal behavior of the pupils was widely researched at that time on both sides of the Atlantic Ocean as strong candidates for pathognomonic findings that could be discerned through a routine neurological examination that could confirm a diagnosis of Dementia praecox.

From 1906 to 1913, Bumke served in Freiburg clinic at the higher rank of senior physician. His first appointment as a professor was in Rostock, where he taught and conducted research from 1914 to 1916. Upon the death of Alois Alzheimer in 1915, Bumke replaced him at Breslau in 1916. He turned down an invitation for a position in Heidelberg in 1918. From 1921 to 1924, he worked with Paul Flechsig in Leipzig.

Doctoring Lenin in Moscow

When V.I. Lenin became ill in Moscow, Bumke was invited to be part of a team of visiting neurological specialists to evaluate and treat —if possible— the ailing leader. Although the plan was for him to be at Lenin's bedside for 3 days in May 1923, Bumke stayed for 7 weeks. Otfrid Foerster, the noted neurologist from Breslau, remained for 7 months. During this period Bumke made the acquaintance of Leon Trotsky and Karl Radek and had favorable impressions of these two men.

Replacing Kraepelin in Munich

On 1 April 1924, Bumke succeeded Emil Kraepelin as the chair of the psychiatry department at the Ludwig-Maximilians-Universität München and as the director of the University Clinic that Kraepelin had founded in 1904. These new appointments arguably made him the most prominent psychiatrist in Germany. Kraepelin had retired from these positions in 1922 in order to devote his energies to the German Research Institute for Psychiatry, an independent multidisciplinary institute in Munich that he had founded in 1917 and which had begun formal research activities in April 1918. Bumke's ascension to these positions marked a striking generational change of direction in Munich and in German psychiatry as a whole. There was a marked professional and personal antipathy between the two men.

In October 1923, just months before succeeding Kraepelin in Munich, Bumke had delivered a lecture in which he directly cast doubt on the reality of Kraepelin's dementia praecox concept as a natural disease entity. "What if dementia praecox simply does not exist?", he asked, also referring to Kraepelin's disease concept assumptions of "course and outcome" as a "dogma" that had "blocked" the progress of psychiatry. This lecture appeared in print only 6 weeks before Bumke began his tenure in Munich, thus setting the stage for a heightening of tension between the two men.

Bumke was considered a gifted speaker and lecturer. He was the editor of psychiatric journals and multivolume sets of research reviews that catalogued and summarized the scientific findings of neurology and psychiatry. He was skeptical of Kraepelinian disease concepts in psychiatry and, following his old mentor Hoche, preferred to conceptualize them as syndromes or "symptom-complexes." He followed the American neurologist and psychiatrist Adolf Meyer in preferring the term "schizophrenic reactions" instead of dementia praecox. He was a critic of psychoanalysis as well as of the relevance of experimental psychology in psychiatry. He was also a strong critic of the degeneration theory underlying the work of Ernst Rüdin.

During the 1928-1929 academic year, Bumke served as Rector of the Ludwig-Maximilians-Universität München. He remained at Munich all through the years of National socialism. He was suspended from office in 1946, then after clearance by the Allied occupation forces was reinstated in 1947. His memoirs, including a collection of aphorisms, were published in 1952, two years after his death.
