= 1933 German League of Nations withdrawal referendum =

Referendum on German withdrawal from the League of Nations

- 12 November 1933
- Do you, German man, and you, German woman, approve this policy of your national government, and are you willing to declare as the expression of your own opinion and your own will and solemnly profess it?

Results
Choice	Votes	%
For	40,633,852	95.08%
Against	2,101,207	4.92%
Valid votes	42,735,059	98.26%
Invalid or blank votes	757,676	1.74%
Total votes	43,492,735	100.00%

A referendum on withdrawing from the League of Nations was held in Germany on 12 November 1933 alongside Reichstag elections. The measure was approved by 95% of voters with a turnout of 96%. It was the first of a series of referendums held by the German cabinet under Chancellor Adolf Hitler, after the cabinet conferred upon itself the ability to hold referendums on 14 July 1933.

The referendum question was on a separate ballot from the one used for the elections. The question was: "Do you, German man, and you, German woman, approve this policy of your national government, and are you willing to declare as the expression of your own opinion and your own will and solemnly profess it?" (German: Billigst Du, Deutscher Mann, und Du, Deutsche Frau, diese Politik Deiner Reichsregierung, und bist Du bereit, sie als den Ausdruck Deiner eigenen Auffassung und Deines eigenen Willens zu erklären und Dich feierlich zu ihr zu bekennen?)

== Background ==
=== Hitler's rise to power ===
Weimar President Paul von Hindenburg appointed Adolf Hitler to the office of Chancellor on 30 January 1933. Hitler wanted the Reichstag to pass an "enabling act" to allow his government to promulgate laws directly, without going through the Reichstag. Lacking the two-thirds supermajority necessary to pass such a constitutional reform, he had Hindenburg dissolve the Reichstag on 31 January. In the resulting election on 5 March, the Nazis surged to 43.9% of the vote. Including his allies, Hitler had 60% of the deputies, but needed the support of the Catholic Centre Party to reach the supermajority. After securing their support by promising to respect the rights of the Catholic Church, the Enabling Act of 1933 passed 441–94 (107 left-wing deputies were arrested or fleeing) on 23 March. Hitler had become a dictator, with Hindenburg technically retaining the ability to dismiss Hitler.

=== Elections in Nazi Germany ===
The Weimar Constitution allowed the President to refer legislation passed by the Reichstag to a referendum. A referendum would also be held if 10% of eligible voters proposed an initiative. On 14 July 1933, the German cabinet used the Enabling Act to pass the "Law concerning the Plebiscite", which permitted the cabinet to call a referendum on "questions of national policy" and "laws which the cabinet had enacted". While the Weimar provisions allowing for referendums were not explicitly repealed, subsequent legislation made it clear those provisions would not be used.

== Conduct ==
To whip up nationalist sentiment in the run up to the vote, the Nazi Party intentionally timed the referendum to take place as close as possible to the fifteenth anniversary of the Armistice of Compiègne, then a bitter memory in the minds of the Nazis and most ordinary Germans. Since German elections always took place on Sundays, the vote was held one day after the anniversary.

Of the democratic nature of the referendum, the political scientist Arnold Zurcher writes that "there undoubtedly was a great deal" of "intangible official pressure" but probably very little "downright coercion and intimidation at the polls". The historian Heinrich August Winkler notes that "the rejection of the Versailles system was extraordinarily popular" and that at this stage in the history of Nazi Germany, it was still possible to vote negatively, to invalidate one's ballot or not to vote at all "without great personal risk". In particular, the Nazis made no effort to prevent the casting of negative or invalid votes in districts that were known to have large populations of Jews, Poles and other ethnic minorities, who were then still allowed to vote. The expected unfavourable results in such areas would be useful in propaganda as proof of disloyalty to the Reich.

== Results ==
In East Prussia, the stronghold of the Junker, support for withdrawal reached 97%, while in Hamburg, formerly a communist stronghold, only 84% voted in favour. This regional variation was repeated in the referendum of 1934. In general, rural parts of the country were more favourable and the cities least favourable to withdrawal, but overall support was higher than for granting Hitler presidential powers in 1934.

Voter turnout was greatest in the Pfalz region, where 98.4% of registered voters cast ballots. It was lowest in the affluent Berlin suburb of Potsdam at 90%.

At a Berlin Jewish hospital there were 122 votes cast, with 101 for "Yes", 12 for "No" and 9 invalid. In the Osthofen concentration camp there were 79 "Yes" votes of 88 entitled to vote, at the Brandenburg concentration camp 1,024 "Yes" votes and 12 "No" votes, and in the Oranienburg concentration camp 330 "Yes" votes and 33 "No".

Choice	Votes	%
For	40,633,852	95.08
Against	2,101,207	4.92
Total	42,735,059	100.00
Valid votes	42,735,059	98.26
Invalid/blank votes	757,676	1.74
Total votes	43,492,735	100.00
Registered voters/turnout	45,178,701	96.27
Source: Nohlen & Stöver 2010, p. 770

== See also ==
- Withdrawal from the United Nations
