= Palace of the Reich President =

Palace in Germany

Coordinates: 52.513978°N 13.381503°E

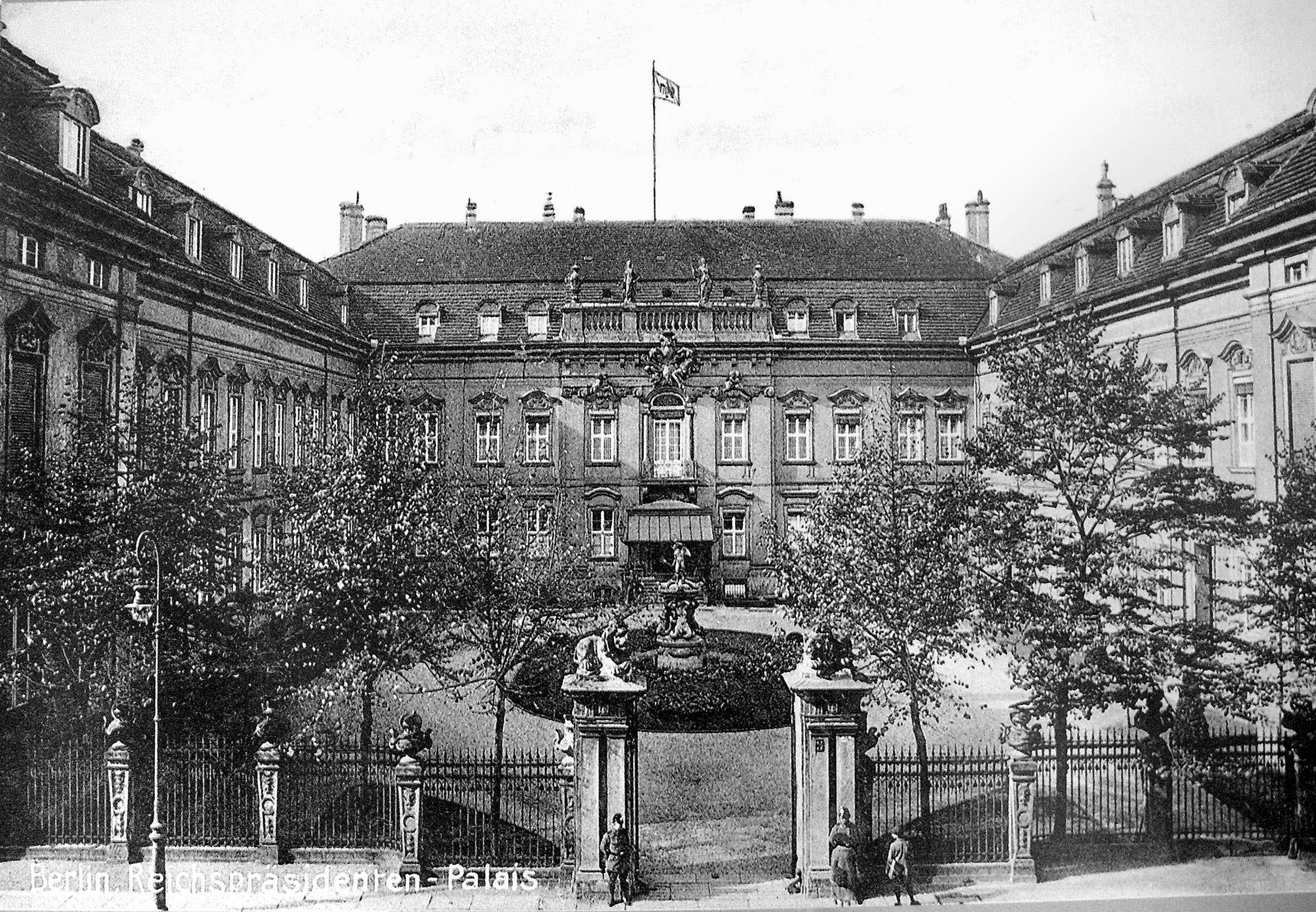
Reich President's Palace, seen from Wilhelmstrasse, around 1920

The Reich President's Palace (German: Reichspräsidentenpalais) was from 1919 to 1934 an official residence of the President of the Reich and the official seat of the German head of state.

The palace was located at Wilhelmstrasse No. 73 in Berlin and housed the Office of the Reich President, which regulated all matters related to the function of the Reich President as a state institution. Private apartments of the President and some of his employees were located in the Palace as well as various representation and reception rooms.

== History of the building ==
=== Construction and uses ===
The building, which later served as the Reich President's Palace, was built between 1735 and 1737 at the instigation of King Frederick William I of Prussia. For the western Friedrichstadt Extension handsome buildings were to be built on the later Wilhelmstrasse; in return, the king awarded inexpensive land and contributed building materials. In 1734, the Geheimrat of the General Superior Finance, War and Domains Directorate and Landjägermeister Hans Bogislav von Schwerin received a building site for a palace and building material worth 40,000 thalers. On August 29, 1737, he and his brother Kurt Christoph von Schwerin received the palace as an hereditary property. Kurt Christoph soon abandoned his share of the property.

The builder was the Berliner Conrad Wiesend; Frenchmen (from the Berlin Huguenot community) may also have been involved in the design of the representative building in Style Louis XV. The design was later completed with several large-scale murals by Bernhard Rode.

After the death of Hans Bogislaw in 1747, his brother Kurt Christoph was given guardianship over his children. On April 2, 1757, a few weeks before his death in the Battle of Prague, he sold the palace, including its furnishings, for 50,000 thalers to Stephan Peter Oliver, Count of Wallis.

In 1769, the Minister of State Valentin von Massow acquired the property for 14,000 thalers. In 1777 it was sold for 22,700 thalers to the chief chamberlain, Reichsgraf Carl von der Osten-Sacken. Until 1811, Osten-Sacken's widow Christiane Charlotte Sophie, born Baroness von Dieskau, was owner of the palace. Her only child, a daughter from her first marriage to Julius Gebhard, imperial count von Hoym, was disowned because of high indebtedness, so that of their six children Prince Friedrich August Carl von Hohenlohe-Neuenstein-Ingelfingen became the sole heir of the palace. He had to sell the house in 1816 to pay off his father's debts.

From 1816 the court book printer Georg Andreas Reimer used the representative rooms for his family, his publishing house and a literary salon, while the wings also worked like a factory. After his death in 1842, his son Georg Ernst Reimer continued his main business in Wilhelmstrasse until 1858.

=== Ministry of the Royal Family ===
The Prussian king Friedrich Wilhelm IV bought the building in 1858. Henceforth it housed the Ministry of the Royal Family and thus among other things the private wealth management of the House of Hohenzollern. House ministers who resided in the palace included Alexander von Schleinitz (1862–1885) and August zu Eulenburg (1914–1918).

In 1919 the German Reich acquired the property from the abdicated German Emperor Wilhelm II, who at that time was urgently in need of funds for the purchase of the Dutch manor Huis Doorn. The banker Eduard von der Heydt acted as an intermediary for the transaction, which was kept top secret for a long time.

=== President ===
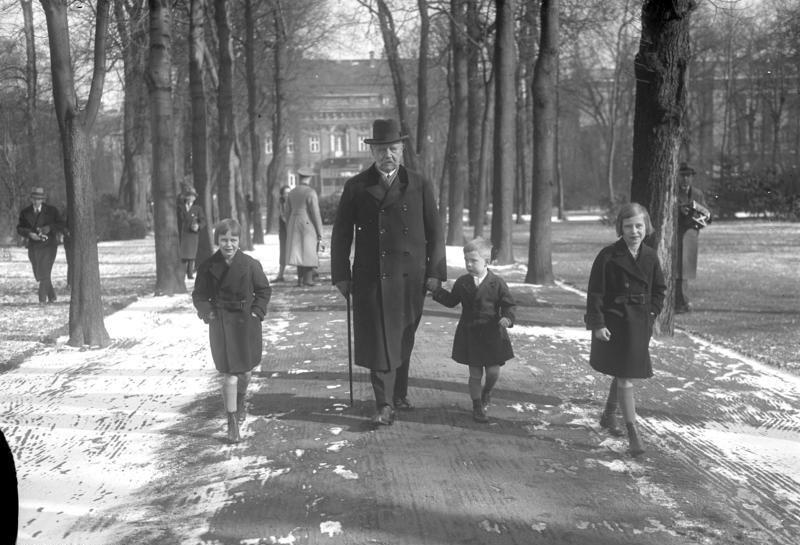
Reich President Hindenburg with grandchildren in the garden of the palace, 1932

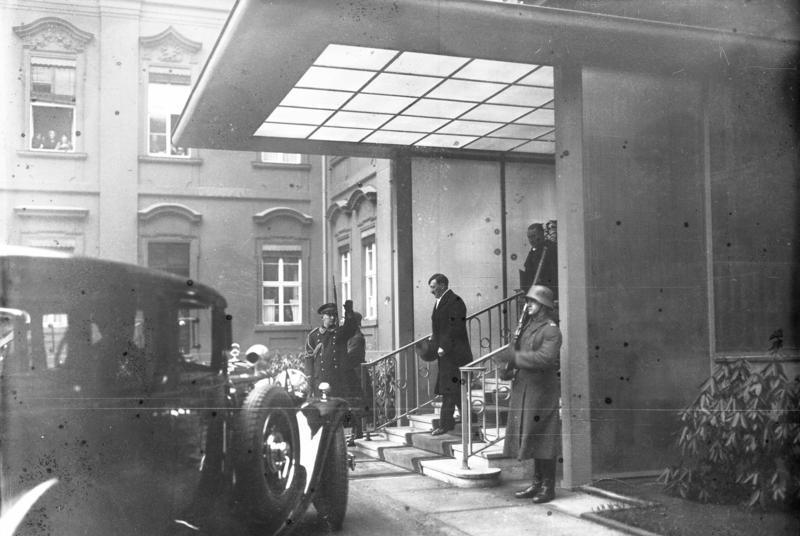
Adolf Hitler is leaving the Reich President Palace after the New Year's reception on January 1, 1934

From 1919 to 1934 the Reich presidents Friedrich Ebert and Paul von Hindenburg resided in the building. It was extensively renovated in 1932/1933, during which time Hindenburg moved to the old Reich Chancellery, Wilhelmstrasse 77. The respective Chancellor ( von Papen, Schleicher, Hitler) was assigned the apartment of the State Secretary of the Reich Chancellery as accommodation during this phase, which was built in 1930 in the annex to the Old Reich Chancellery.

After Hindenburg's death on August 2, 1934, the palace became the seat of the "Presidential Chancellery", the successor authority to the President's Office. Adolf Hitler, who had been Hindenburg's successor as Reich President and Chancellor since August 3, 1934, now resided in the “Führerwohnung” in the renovated and converted Old Reich Chancellery, as well as in his private apartments in Munich and on the Berghof at Berchtesgaden. From 1939, the Reich Foreign Minister Joachim von Ribbentrop lived in the former private apartments of the President. For this purpose, the building was extensively rebuilt according to plans by Albert Speer in 1938/1939.

=== After 1945 ===
After insignificant bomb hits and air pressure damage, the palace suffered from fires and artillery hits in the final stages of the street battles for the government district during the Battle of Berlin. The building, now located in East Berlin, and again called Palais Schwerin was considered to be "largely preserved" after the war and was intended to be rebuilt. Regardless, in the immediate post-war period it suffered severe damage by the Clearance Office of the Berlin Magistrate. The structure was looted for valuable construction material, including its heating boiler. Particularly damaging was the dismantling of the iron roof structure, when the four baroque sandstone sculptures, including balustrade and the cartouche of the middle avant-corps, were toppled and destroyed. The alarmed monument protection authority could only prevent the removal of the dismantled roof, but was unable to restore it. In 1950 the palace was declared a part of the "German cultural heritage". When a panel of experts examined the palace in 1951, it registered a degree of destruction of 48%, largely due to neglect during the post-war period, and stated: "Only the interior design is really to be considered lost." The masonry was "not undermined by the fire" and required "for the most part only external restoration". In December 1958 it was decided that the palace should be used as the magistrate's guest house. However, the magistrate unexpectedly decided in December 1959 to demolish the Reich President's Palace, the neighboring Palaces of Princes Alexander and Georg and Monbijou Palace. The monument protection authority protested this decision in vain, citing the Cultural Association of the GDR and well-known scientists: "Blowing up this last baroque palais in the Wilhelmstrasse would be unconscionable for posterity. It must be the primary duty of Berlin's monument preservation authorities to save the last remaining buildings of old Berlin". In November 1960, the palace was demolished and cleared.

The balcony grille above the central portal has been preserved and is still located today in a residential building in Berlin-Köpenick, Bahnhofstraße 4. The two sandstone lions, who crowned the pillars of the gate on Wilhelmstrasse, were initially moved to Tierpark Berlin at Berlin-Friedrichsfelde. From 1961 the garden was located in the exclusion zone of the Berlin Wall.

In the 1980s the GDR had an extensive Plattenbau residential complex built along Wilhelmstrasse, and thus also over the old building, in order to erase the memory of Prussian Wilhelmstrasse. In 1964 the street had already been renamed to Otto-Grotewohl-Straße.

A memorial column now tells the story of the palace. It stands in front of Number 78 on Wilhelmstrasse, which was opened again for public access in 1993 after the German reunification. The southern edge of the property roughly corresponds to today's Hannah-Arendt-Straße in full length. Part of the Holocaust Memorial covers the former park.

== Palace plan ==
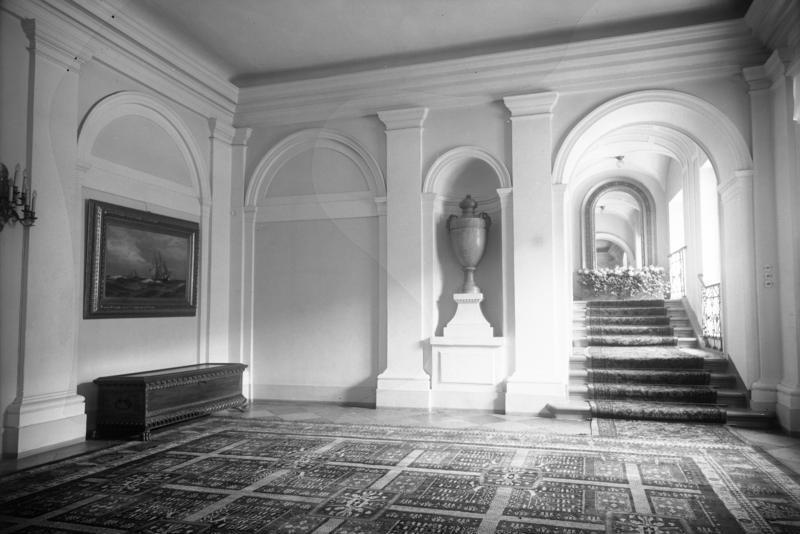
Entrance hall

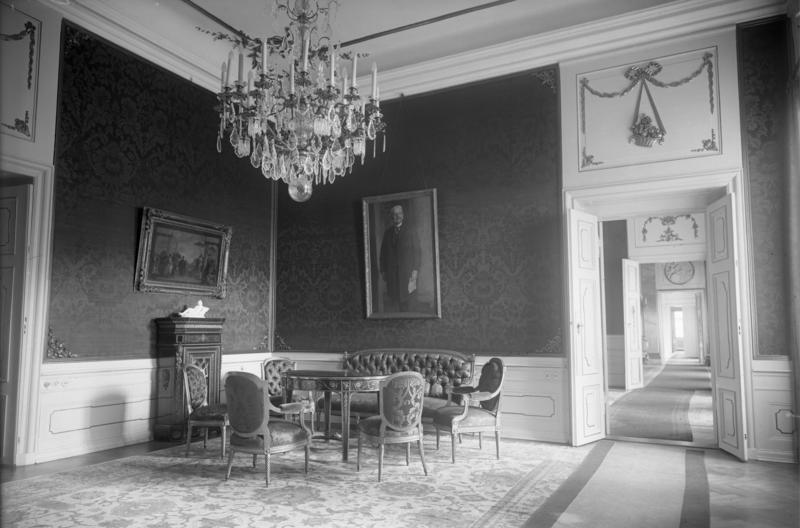
Ambassador or diplomat room

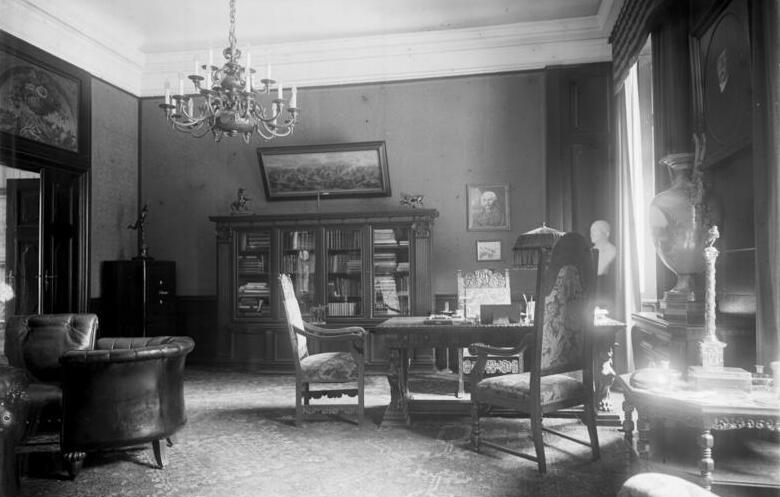
President's Office

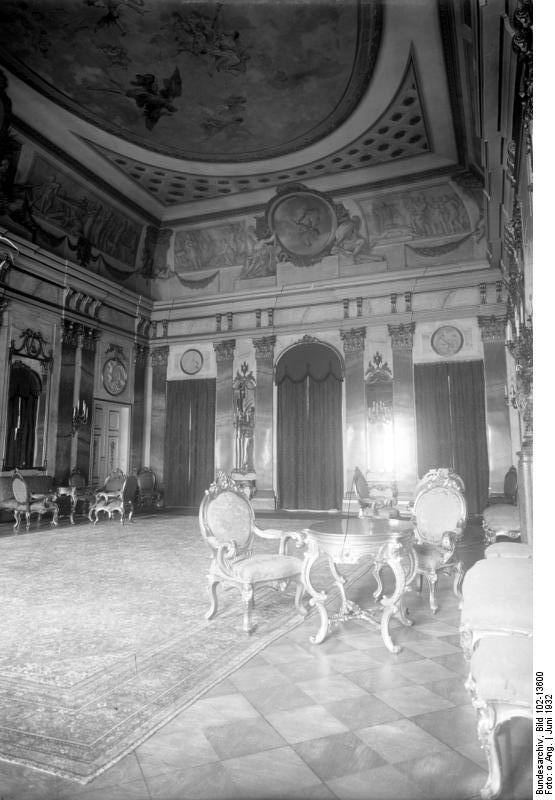
Large ballroom

The building of the actual palace consisted of three wings. In addition, there were some outbuildings such as a garage for the President's vehicle fleet, a rear building and various small garden houses, greenhouses and a chicken coop.

On the forecourt at the front of the palace was a so-called “courtyard” covered with gravel, on which the Reich President received foreign ambassadors and heads of state as well as other distinguished guests. In later years it was common for a twenty-member honorary formation of the Reichswehr to take a stand on the courtyard whenever the President entered or left his office. In the courtyard there was a fountain decorated with allegorical figures, behind which a wide glass staircase led to the entrance to the palace.

In addition to the office of the President in the left wing of the building (“Chancellery”) and the representative rooms for official occasions (receptions, banquets, dance evenings, etc.) in the central part, the residence comprised various private accommodations. While the president and the chief of the office of the Reich President as the highest-ranking house residents each had their own spacious apartments -; the office manager had twenty-six rooms at his right wing ("Meissner wing") at his disposal; - other house residents had to be at their disposal to make do with smaller apartments. The caretaker of the building (usually a man named Horst Tappe) lived in an apartment on the top floor, while the chauffeur of the head of state (Heinrich Demant) lived in the rooms above the former imperial stables that had been converted into a garage for the vehicle fleet.

The building was surrounded by a large park, which included walking paths, lawns and flower beds as well as some vegetable beds hidden behind hedges. In 1925 the street along the garden gate was named after the late Reich President who had just died at " Friedrich-Ebert-Strasse".

== Residents of the palace ==
The "residents" of the Imperial Presidential Palace can be divided into two groups. On the one hand, those who “inhabited” the palace in the narrower sense, ie who not only did their work in the palace, but also lived there privately. And secondly, those people who came to the palace during the day to perform certain tasks, but did not live there privately.

Among the residents of the first group are the respective holders of the office of the Reich President. In addition to the Reich President Ebert and von Hindenburg, the head of the head of state's office, State Secretary Otto Meissner, was constantly at home in the palace from 1920 to 1939. There were also the families of these three men. During Ebert's presidency, his wife and two sons lived in the palace, while Hindenburg brought his son Oskar and his daughter-in-law Margarete and the couple's three children, of whom the youngest was born in the palace with. Meissner's household consisted of his wife and two children, including the son Hans-Otto Meissner. Other people who not only worked in the palace, but also had their own apartments there, were the house inspector (chief of domestic staff) Wilhelm Tappe, Hindenburg's personal servant Oskar Putz (called "Karl" to avoid confusion with the son of the same name of the head of state) and the presidential chauffeur Otto Demant and the chauffeur of the president's office Kurt Nehls.

The President's staff and household staff were only to be found on the premises during the working hours of the palace. The Reich President's staff usually consisted of fifteen middle and senior officials, ten female typists and eight clerks. The housekeeping team consisted of cooks, cleaners, maids, gardeners, a carpenter who did repairs, and the guards.

Among the members of the staff of the Reich President, whose most important collaborators were Ebert and Hindenburg in the same way, are to be emphasized: The Ministerialrat Heinrich Doehle, who dealt with domestic affairs, and the Legationsrat Oswald von Hoyningen-Huene, who was assigned to the President of the Reich as representative of the Federal Foreign Office, as well as High Government Councilor Wilhelm Geilenberg, who ran the cash register. In addition, there were one or two officers who served as liaison officers to the Reich Ministry of Defense. Under Hindenburg his son Oskar von Hindenburg took over the post of the first military adjutant of the Reich President and Wedige von der Schulenburg that of the second adjutant.

== Literature ==
- Laurenz Demps, Berlin-Wilhelmstraße. Eine Topographie preußisch-deutscher Macht, Ch. Links, 2000 ISBN 3-86153-228-X
- Hans-Otto Meissner, Junge Jahre im Reichspräsidentenpalais, Bechtle Verlag Esslingen 1988, ISBN 3-7628-0469-9
