= State Court for the German Reich =

Constitutional court of the Weimar Republic

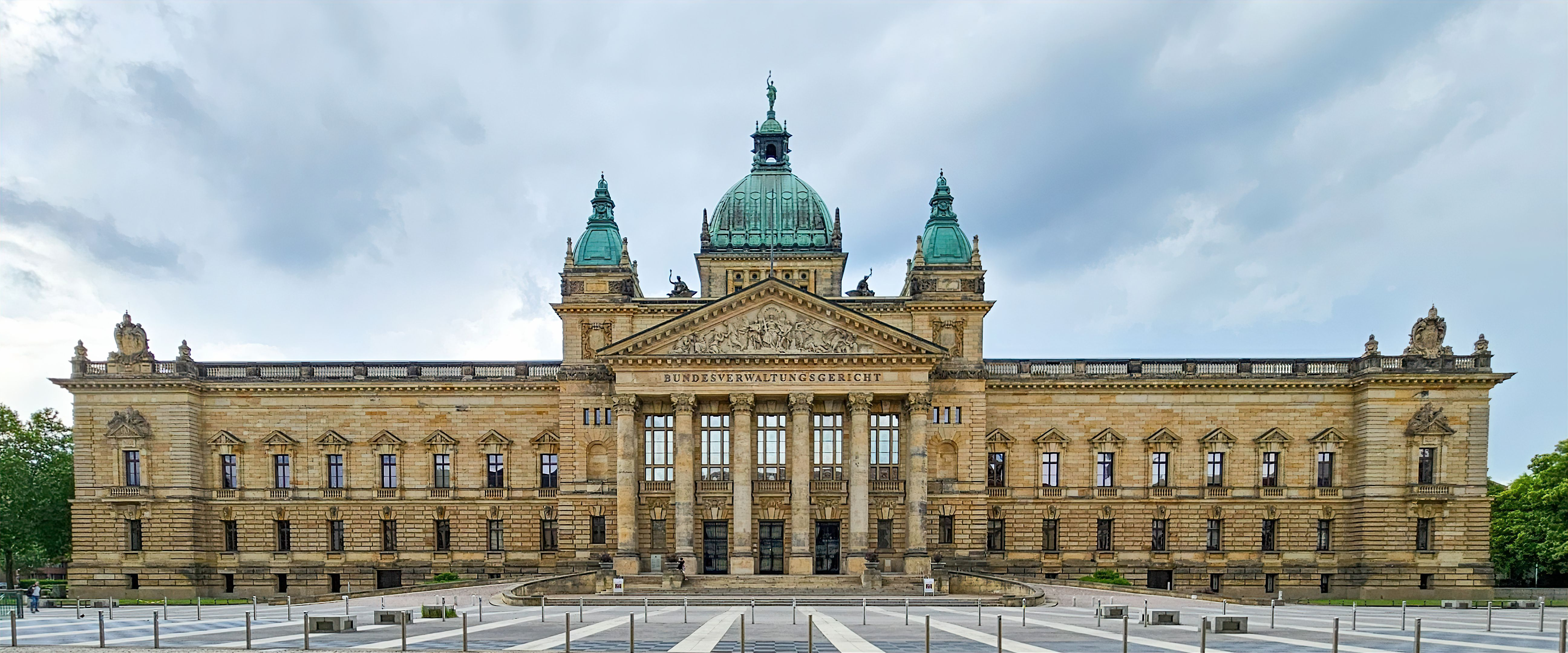
The Reich Court building in Leipzig where the State Court for the German Reich was seated

The State Court for the German Reich (German: Staatsgerichtshof für das Deutsche Reich, pronounced [ˈʃtaːtsɡəˌʁɪçtshoːf fyːɐ das ˈdɔʏtʃə ˈʁaɪç]) was the constitutional court of the Weimar Republic. Its jurisdiction was limited to disputes concerning the legal organisation of the state. The court was established in 1921 and ceased functioning in February 1933, shortly after Adolf Hitler became chancellor of Germany.

The State Court's primary area of jurisdiction was in disputes over the interpretation and application of the Weimar Constitution and of the constitutions of the individual federal states. Such cases included the implementation of national laws by the states and disputes within a state regarding its own constitution. The court could not rule on whether a Reich law was compatible with the Reich constitution or a state law with a national law. The State Court's most famous case concerned the legality of the Reich government's removal of the legally elected government of the state of Prussia in 1932 (the Preussenschlag).

The State Court was also empowered to handle impeachments of the chancellor and national ministers.

== Organisation and jurisdiction ==
The State Court for the German Reich was established under Article 108 of the Weimar Constitution by the Law on the State Court of 9 July 1921. Its seat was at Leipzig along with the Reichsgericht (Reich Court or National Court). The State Court did not sit permanently but was convened only as required (§1 of the Law on the State Court). The president of the State Court was also the president of the Reich Court. The State Court determined its rules of procedure independently. The decisions were issued in the name of the Reich and could not be appealed (§28 of the Law on the State Court). According to Article 19 §2 of the Weimar Constitution, the president of Germany was responsible for the execution of its decisions.

During the Weimar period, jurisdiction in Germany suffered from fragmentation and gaps in competence. The Reichsgericht and not the State Court was responsible for examining the compatibility of state law with Reich law (Article 13 §2 of the Weimar Constitution). The State Court was also not responsible for the clarification of constitutional disputes at the Reich level and was unable to review the conformity of Reich laws to the Reich constitution. In addition it lacked the authority to rule on disputes about the extent of the rights and duties of major constitutional bodies (e.g. the Reichstag, Reichsrat, president, etc.) or their members in disputes between them. In special areas, other courts such as the Supreme Finance Court (Reichsfinanzhof) were responsible for abstract judicial review. The Electoral Court (Wahlprüfungsgericht)) at the Reichstag was also a constitutional court in the broader sense.

=== Constitutional disputes ===
The State Court handled federal constitutional disputes. Those involved legal disputes regarding the specific interpretation and application of the Reich constitution and the constitutions of the federal states.

The State Court was responsible for:

- Disputes between the Reich and the states concerning the implementation of Reich laws by the states (Article 15 §3). The State Court ruled on differences of opinion regarding complaints about the exercise of Reich supervision. The basis for this was the obligation of the state governments to remedy, at the request of the Reich government, any deficiencies that occurred when a state was implementing Reich laws. The State Court issued a total of three rulings in the area.
- Disputes over property in the reorganisation of the Reich territory (Article 18 §7). One special case of disputes between the states was the decision on the division of property in the event of a reorganisation of the states. The court dealt with the provision only once, when it dismissed a political party's lawsuit against the union of Waldeck with Prussia in 1929.
- Constitutional disputes within a state if there was no state court to deal with them (Article 19 §1). States without their own constitutional jurisdiction were Prussia, Saxony, Lippe, Lübeck, Mecklenburg-Strelitz and Schaumburg-Lippe. In the other states, the State Court had no jurisdiction.
- Disputes of a non-private legal nature between different states or between the Reich and a state at the request of one of the parties in dispute (also Article 19 §1). This referred to public-law disputes regarding sovereign rights, national borders, state treaties and public assets. The governments had the right to bring an action.
- Constitutional disputes between the Reich and a state (Article 19 §1, amended). According to the provision, the State Court should decide only if no other court was responsible. The subject of the proceedings could be disputes over the interpretation of concluded treaties, the participation of the states in the decision-making process of the Reich or claims of a state against the Reich, especially claims of a financial nature. The provision served to define the spheres of competence of the Reich and the states and to protect the states from inadmissible interference by the Reich.

=== Impeachment of ministers ===
Under Article 59 of the Weimar Constitution, the president of Germany, the chancellor or a national minister could be impeached before the State Court. The proceedings were to be conducted according to the rules of the Code of Criminal Procedure. Details of the process were laid out in §§1–15 of the Law on the State Court. The court hearing the case was to be a specially formed constitutional court. It consisted of the president of the Reichsgericht, one member each from the Prussian Higher Administrative Court, the Bavarian Supreme State Court and the Hanseatic Supreme State Court, and a lawyer. Five additional associate judges were to be elected by the Reichstag and the Reichsrat (§3). The constitution did not speak to possible punishments. The quasi-criminal impeachment of ministers was never used, either at the national or the state level.

== The Preussenschlag ==
The most high-profile decision of the State Court was the case of Prussia contra Reich concerning the 1932 Prussian coup d'état (Preussenschlag). On 20 July 1932, an emergency decree issued by Reich President Paul von Hindenburg under Article 48 of the Weimar Constitution deposed the Prussian government and appointed Chancellor Franz von Papen Reich Commissioner for Prussia. The following day, Prussia brought suit against the action before the State Court. The State Court denied the legality of the government's dismissal, since it had not been guilty of any breach of duty under Article 48 §1 of the constitution. The temporary appointment of a transitional Reich Commissioner by way of an emergency decree according to Article 48 §2 was, however, deemed permissible; there was no abuse of discretion by the president of the Reich since the internal situation of Prussia was endangered in its security and order.

The Prussian government was allowed to continue to represent Prussia in the Reichsrat and in relation to the other states, but within Prussia the Reich Commissioner ruled. The judgment was intended to conciliate by not fully upholding the rights of either side. It was seen by the public as indecisive and a defeat for Papen's government. The fact that the trial also proved the fundamental inadequacy of a judicial process for dealing with political power struggles, as Ernst Rudolf Huber and Carl Schmitt argued in 1932 in 'Reich Authority and the State Court' (Reichsgewalt und Staatsgerichtshof ) and foresaw that in the future, political solutions would be sought outside the realm of legality. The court's ruling was ignored by the Papen government and President von Hindenburg, and the emergency decree was neither withdrawn nor modified.

== End of the Court ==
After Adolf Hitler's appointment to the chancellorship in January 1933, the constitutional jurisdiction of the State Court came to an immediate end. Hitler governed under the Führer principle, which did not provide for reviewing the decisions of the executive by an independent judicial body. The State Court ceased its work. There was no dissolution law or any other formal act. The court announced its last decisions on 21 February 1933.

== Evaluation ==
The greatest deficiency of the Weimar Constitution's judicial section was the lack of a mechanism for constitutional complaints by which a citizen could challenge the violation of his fundamental rights. The Weimar Constitution had an extensive catalogue of fundamental rights, but most of the articles were only programmatic in character and were not directly applicable, enforceable law. For the average citizen, the road to the State Court was not open. During the Weimar period, the protection of fundamental rights was predominantly understood to be the task not of the constitutional courts but of the administrative courts. Article 107 of the constitution provided for the establishment of such a court, but it was not set up until 1941. Accordingly, the court remained ineffective.
