= Law Concerning the Head of State of the German Reich =

1934 law of Nazi Germany

- Reichsadler of the Weimar Republic, from 1928 to 1935

Hitler cabinet
- Citation: RGBl. I S. 747
- Enacted by: Hitler cabinet
- Signed by: Adolf Hitler, Reich Chancellor
- Signed: 1 August 1934
- Commenced: 2 August 1934
- Status: Repealed

The Law Concerning the Head of State of the German Reich (German: Gesetz über das Staatsoberhaupt des Deutschen Reichs) was a statute enacted by the government of Nazi Germany on 1 August 1934 that consolidated the positions of Reich President and Reich Chancellor in the person of Adolf Hitler.

== Background ==
The head of state of the Weimar Republic was the Reich President, established by Part I, Section 3 of the Weimar Constitution of 1919. The Reich President was also the Supreme Commander of the German Reichswehr, held the power to appoint and remove the chancellor, could dissolve the Reichstag and call new elections and held the power of pardon.

In the summer of 1934, the presidency was held by Paul von Hindenburg, who had been elected in 1925 to a seven-year term and reelected in 1932. Now 86 years old, he had become ill with lung cancer in April 1934 and his health was rapidly deteriorating. In early June, he withdrew from Berlin to his country estate in Neudeck, East Prussia (today Ogrodzieniec, in Poland).

The constitution had originally decreed that in the event of a presidential vacancy, the chancellor was to temporarily execute the duties of the office until a new presidential election could be arranged. This was the procedure that was followed when the first Reich President Friedrich Ebert died in 1925. However, according to a constitutional amendment passed in December 1932 regarding any future presidential succession, the President of the Reichsgericht (Supreme Court) replaced the chancellor as the interim Reich President. In 1934, this would have been Erwin Bumke, then a member of the German National People's Party. Ironically, the Nazis had proposed this change ahead of Hitler's assumption of power, in order to allay fears of the presidency also falling under Hitler's control were he to become chancellor.

Hitler, who had been appointed Reich Chancellor on 30 January 1933, now saw this arrangement as a potential threat, since the new president would have the authority to dismiss him. For some time he had been apprehensive of the president and conservative forces in the army replacing him with a military dictatorship. Accordingly, as early as in April 1934, Hitler began to lay plans for altering the rules of succession yet again, after he had learned that Hindenburg would likely die before the year was out. To that end, Hitler sought to persuade the top military commanders to support him as Hindenburg's successor. According to the emergency powers granted to it by the Enabling Act, the Reich government (i.e., the Chancellor and his cabinet) could enact laws, without the involvement of the Reichstag or the Reich President. In certain circumstances, these laws could deviate from the constitution. However, one such exception was in Article 2 of the Act, which stipulated that "the rights of the President remain unaffected." This provision has long been interpreted to forbid Hitler from attempting to tamper with the presidency.

The passage of the Enabling Act and the banning of all other parties left the president's power to dismiss the chancellor as the only remedy by which Hitler could be legally removed from office, and thus the only check on his power. This fact was made clear to Hitler in July 1934, when Hindenburg was so outraged by escalating Nazi excesses that he threatened to sack Hitler and declare martial law unless Hitler acted immediately to defuse the tension. Hitler responded by ordering the Night of the Long Knives, in which several SA leaders, most notably Ernst Röhm, were murdered along with several of Hitler's other past rivals.

On 1 August 1934, Hindenburg's physicians told Hitler that the president had less than twenty-four hours to live. Hitler convened the cabinet that very evening. It immediately enacted the "Law Concerning the Head of State of the German Reich" that formally combined the positions of Reich President and Reich Chancellor under the title of Führer and Reich Chancellor and granted the new post to Hitler, cementing his near-unilateral rule.

== Text ==
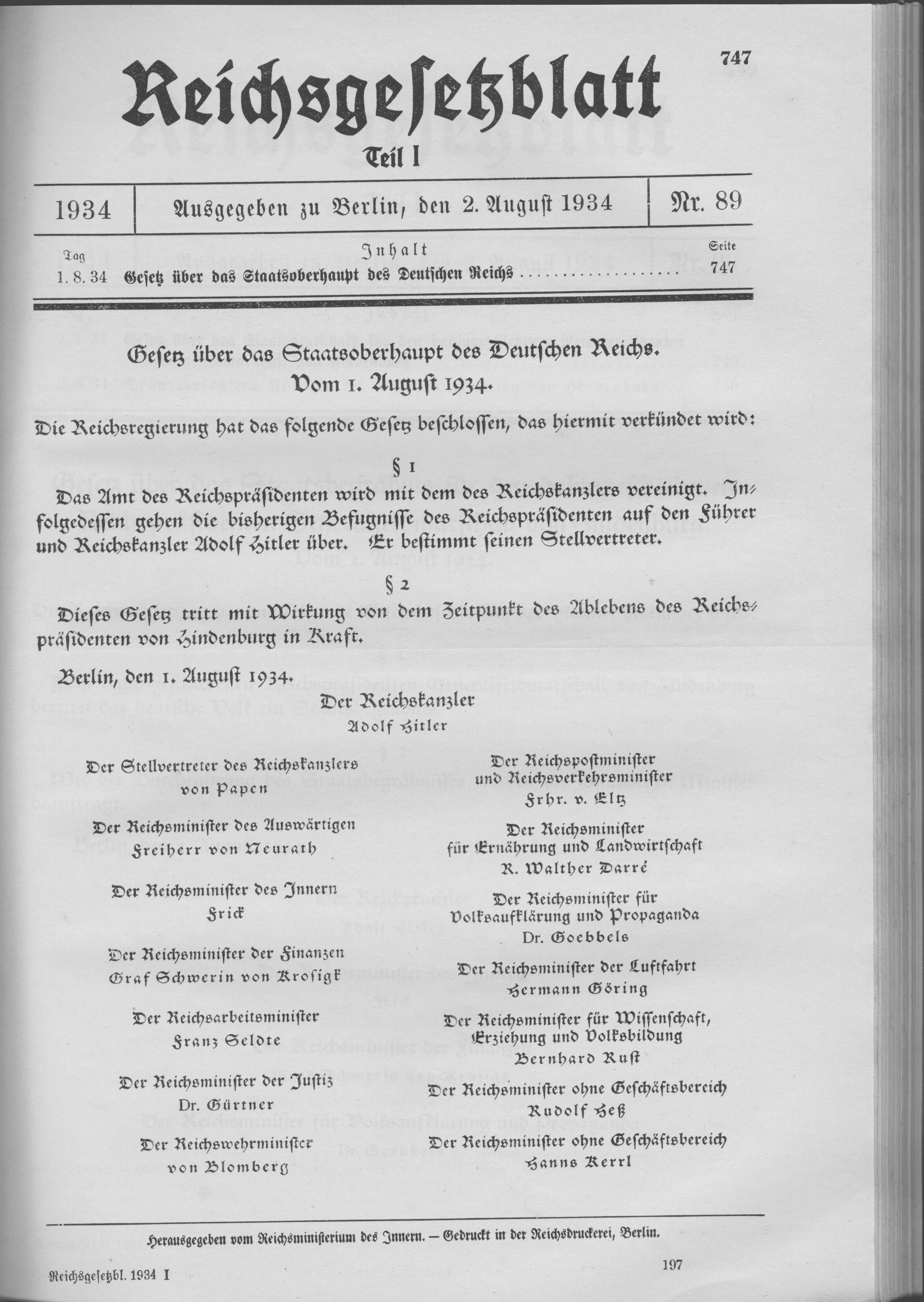
Promulgation of the Law Concerning the Head of State of the German Reich in the Reichsgesetzblatt of 2 August 1934

Like with most laws passed during the process of Gleichschaltung, this law is very short. The full text is available below in German and in English:

German	English
Gesetz über das Staatsoberhaupt des Deutschen Reichs; Vom 1. August 1934 Die Reichsregierung hat das folgende Gesetz beschlossen, das hiermit verkündet wird:	Law Concerning the Head of State of the German Reich; August 1, 1934 The Reich Government has passed the following law, which is hereby promulgated:
§1; Das Amt des Reichspräsidenten wird mit dem des Reichskanzlers vereinigt. Infolgedessen gehen die bisherigen Bezugnisse des Reichspräsidenten auf den Führer und Reichskanzler Adolf Hitler über. Er bestimmt seinen Stellvertreter.	§1; The office of Reich President will be combined with that of Reich Chancellor. The existing authority of the Reich President will consequently be transferred to the Führer and Reich Chancellor, Adolf Hitler. He will select his deputy.
§2; Dieses Gesetz tritt mit Wirkung von dem Zeitpunkt des Ablebens des Reichspräsidenten von Hindenburg in Kraft.	§2; This law will take effect at the time of death of Reich President von Hindenburg.

The law was signed by Hitler in his position as Reichskanzler, Deputy Chancellor Franz von Papen, and 13 other members of the Reich cabinet.

== Aftermath ==
President Hindenburg died on 2 August, the day after enactment of the law. Hitler immediately assumed the powers and duties of the presidency in accordance with the law and was styled "Führer und Reichskanzler" (Leader and Reich Chancellor). As justification for these changes, Hitler claimed that the presidency had become so linked with Hindenburg that the title Reich President was "inseparably united" with him and should not be used again. In addition, he called for a referendum on 19 August to ratify these actions. The day before the balloting, Oskar von Hindenburg, the late president's son, delivered a nationwide radio speech in favor of the referendum in which he claimed that his father had endorsed Hitler as his successor:

My father had himself seen in Adolf Hitler his own direct successor as head of the German state, and I am acting in accordance with my father's intention when I call on all German men and women to vote for the handing over of my father's office to the Führer and Reich Chancellor.

This was a misrepresentation of the former president's true wishes. According to historian William L. Shirer, Hindenburg, anticipating his death, had prepared a document advocating a restoration of the House of Hohenzollern in a constitutional monarchy. This document was found by the president's son and, through Vice Chancellor Papen, was turned over to Hitler to whom it was addressed. Hitler told Papen he would decide at a later time if and when it would be published; it never was. The fact that it was never found among the thousands of captured secret government documents at the end of World War II argues for the fact that it most likely was destroyed. Also noteworthy was the promotion of Oskar von Hindenburg, a career army officer in the Reichswehr, from Oberst to Generalmajor shortly following the referendum.

The referendum took place in an atmosphere of voter intimidation and outright electoral fraud. In some polling stations, ballots were pre-marked as "yes" votes; in others, spoiled ballots were counted as favorable votes; and votes tallied in some constituencies actually exceeded the number of registered voters. In any case, the referendum, along with all attempts to make Hitler head of state and head of government, was illegal and unconstitutional, as it violated Article 2 of the Enabling Act. Nevertheless, this went unchallenged both legally and by the public. Official figures showed the law was approved with 89.93% of the vote on a turnout of 95.7%.

By merging the two offices in his person, Hitler ensured that he could never be dismissed as chancellor by the head of state. By becoming Supreme Commander of the Reichswehr, he ensured the loyalty of the military, particularly after his Minister of Defense, Generaloberst Werner von Blomberg, altered the military oath so that all members of the armed forces swore unconditional allegiance, not to the Republic or to the constitution, but to Hitler personally. The oath was administered to all members of the armed forces on 2 August 1934.

Hitler remained head of state until his suicide on 30 April 1945. In his final political testament, he named Großadmiral Karl Dönitz as Reich President, thereby resurrecting the office he had effectively usurped nearly 11 years earlier.

== See also ==
- Gleichschaltung

== Sources ==
- Bullock, Alan (1962). Hitler: A Study in Tyranny. New York: Harper Torchbooks. ISBN 978-0-060-92020-3.
- Evans, Richard J. (2005). The Third Reich in Power. New York: Penguin Books. ISBN 1-59420-074-2.
- Kershaw, Ian (2008). Hitler: A Biography. W.W. Norton & Co. ISBN 978-0-393-33761-7.
- Noakes, Jeremy; Pridham, Geoffrey, eds. (1998) [1983]. Nazism 1919-1945, Volume 1: The Rise to Power 1919-1934. University of Exeter Press. ISBN 0-85989 598 X.
- Shirer, William (1960). The Rise and Fall of the Third Reich. New York: Simon and Schuster. ISBN 978-0-831-77404-2.
