= Reichsgericht =

Highest court in Germany from 1879 to 1945

Reich Court
- Reichsgericht
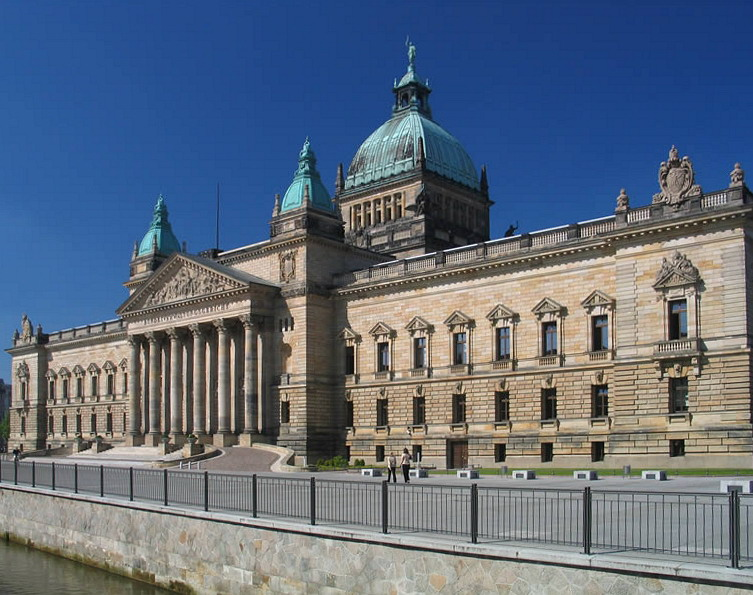
- The Reich Court building in Leipzig (today the seat of the Federal Administrative Court)
- Interactive map of Reich Court
- 51°19′59″N 12°22′11″E
- Established: 1 October 1879
- Dissolved: 30 October 1945
- Jurisdiction: German Reich
- Location: Leipzig, Saxony, German Reich
- Coordinates: 51°19′59″N 12°22′11″E
- Language: German
- Type of tribunal: Supreme Court

The Reichsgericht (German: [ˈʁaɪçs.ɡəˌʁɪçt], lit. 'Reich Court') was the Supreme Court of the German Reich based in Leipzig from 1879 to 1945, encompassing the periods of the German Empire, Weimar Republic and Nazi Germany, and was abolished following defeat in World War II.

The Reichsgericht began its work on 1 October 1879, when the Reichsjustizgesetze (Imperial Judiciary Acts) came into effect. The acts standardised court types and procedural rules across the German Reich and established judicial independence and unrestricted access to the courts.

The court's jurisdiction included both criminal and civil cases, but not military cases. It handled appeals, charges of treason and, after 1920, the compatibility of state and Reich laws. Throughout its life, its major rulings tended to be conservative. They included the conviction of Karl Liebknecht for high treason in 1907, the lenient treatment of the men charged in the 1920 Kapp Putsch and support of the Nazi antisemitic and racist laws.

== Composition and jurisdiction ==
The court was headed by a president and a number of senate presidents and counsellors (Reichsgerichtsräte). The number of civil and criminal senates was determined by the Reich Chancellor until 1924, at which point the Reich minister of justice took over the task. During the imperial period, the president of the Reichsgericht, the presidents of the senates and the members of the Reichsgericht were appointed by the emperor on the recommendation of the Bundesrat, then during the Weimar era by the Reich president on the recommendation of the Reichsrat. The formal prerequisites for appointment were meeting the general qualifications for the office of judge and having reached the age of 35.

The Reichsgericht was a court of general jurisdiction. It ruled on criminal and civil cases (including civil disputes, legal acts of the state in its fiscal capacity, commercial matters and labour law). There was no separate labour court system (Arbeitsgerichtsbarkeit) until 1926. The Reichsgericht was also responsible for state liability law. As vested competencies, the Reichsgericht decided on civil appeals of final judgments and complaints against orders of Higher Regional Courts (Oberlandesgerichte). Until 1934, the Reichsgericht ruled in the first and last instance on cases of high treason and treason if the crimes were directed against the German emperor or the state.

From 1920, with the implementation law for Article 13(2) of the Weimar Constitution, the Reichsgericht also ruled on the compatibility of state and Reich law.

== Case law ==
=== Empire ===
Flag of the German Empire

With the exception of its jurisdiction in matters of treason, the Reichsgericht was purely an appellate court during the era of the German Empire. Its task was to ensure uniformity of jurisprudence throughout the territory of the German Empire. A national civil code (the Bürgerliches Gesetzbuch) went only into effect on 1 January 1900, and the civil law systems of the individual states were not harmonised with one another until this time. The General State Laws for the Prussian States, for the Rhineland, Baden, Saxony and uncodified common law all applied side by side.

Critics saw the Reichsgericht as a continuation of the Prussian High Tribunal. The judiciary was characterised by monarchical conservatism. Particularly in the area of criminal law, critical voices were in the minority at the court during the Empire, as they were in other state institutions at the time. In 1912, for example, the court ruled that the publication by the Social Democratic Party (SPD) of a brochure that was aimed at civil servants and called on them to vote for the SPD was offensive. In its verdict of 12 October 1907 in the high treason trial against Karl Liebknecht, the Reichsgericht stated that the unconditional obedience of soldiers to the emperor was a central provision of the Constitution of the German Empire. Liebknecht had argued that imperial orders were null and void if they were intended to violate the constitution. He was sentenced to eighteen months in prison for acts preliminary to high treason.

=== Weimar Republic ===
Flag of the Weimar Republic

In the Weimar Republic, the court continued in its conservative path, especially in the area of criminal law. In the judgments it handed down on 21 December 1921 in the trial of three participants in the right-wing Kapp Putsch, there was only one conviction – Traugott von Jagow, the interior minister under the putsch government, who was sentenced to the minimum penalty of five years' imprisonment. The criminal proceedings against two co-defendants were dropped because, according to the court, they had not played a leading role in the coup attempt. None of the leaders of the putsch was ever brought to trial.

In the 1921 Leipzig war crimes trials which took place before the Reichsgericht, only a few German war criminals were punished. Many cases were dropped, and of the few convictions, the verdicts against two members of the navy for sinking an English hospital ship were later secretly overturned. On 23 November 1931, Carl von Ossietzky was sentenced to 18 months in prison for espionage in the Weltbühne trial because an article published in his magazine had revealed the secret and illegal rearmament of the Reichswehr.

Since violence from the right was not countered as forcefully as that from the left – some verdicts in the trials of the right-wing Feme murders in particular justified the accusation – the Weltbühne trial and others like it contributed to the view that the judiciary during the Weimar Republic was "blind in its right eye".

The Reichsgericht made some groundbreaking decisions in the field of civil law during the period. Revaluation case law, for example, which developed under the impact of German hyperinflation and the Great Depression, was nothing short of revolutionary. The Reichsgericht for the first time granted itself the authority to examine laws for their validity, which led to the previously recognised mark-for-mark principle (par value principle) being abandoned due to the extremely high rate of inflation.

=== Nazi era ===
Flag of Germany (1935–1945)

After Adolf Hitler came to power, the Law on Admission to the Bar forced Jewish and Social Democratic judges (including Senate President Alfons David and Reichsgericht justice Hermann Grossmann) to resign, and Jewish lawyers at the Reichsgericht were prevented from continuing their work.

In the period that followed, the Reichsgericht did not oppose the Nazi takeover or the regime's numerous illegal acts. Instead it became deeply entangled in the National Socialist justice system, for example when it sentenced the Dutch communist Marinus van der Lubbe to death on the basis of the retroactively applied Law on Imposition and Enforcement of the Death Penalty in the Reichstag fire trial. The acquittal of the other four defendants was one of the reasons why the Reichsgericht was stripped of its jurisdiction in matters of treason in 1934 by the law that established the People's Court.

Germany's annexation of Austria in 1938 led to the dissolution of the Supreme Court of Justice in Vienna and the transfer of its jurisdiction to the Reichsgericht. When the measure was implemented on 1 April 1939, the Reichsgericht became the supreme court of appeal for Austrian civil cases. Although partial reforms were made to Austrian substantive law, the Austrian General Civil Code remained the applicable private law code in Austria. Meanwhile, the 8th Civil Senate was established at the Reichsgericht, to which all legal matters concerning Austria, the Sudeten German territories and the Protectorate of Bohemia and Moravia were assigned whenever the jurisdiction of the first five senates was not applicable. It was dissolved due to understaffing before the Reichsgericht was abolished.

==== Racial Laws ====
In civil law, the Reichsgericht handed down decisions – for example on marriage and contract law – that affected the status of Jews under the National Socialist government. In 1935, the Reichsgericht wrote:

The court is in agreement with the verdict that, given the fundamental importance of the racial question in the National Socialist state, the education of young people of Aryan descent to become members of the national community conscious of their kind and race, forms an integral part of the educational process and that this education is not guaranteed if the foster mother but not the foster father is of Aryan descent.

— Reichsgericht, Judgment of 2 November 1935 – IV B 7/35

In 1935, in a further development of the law, the Reichsgericht recognised even before the Nuremberg Laws were passed that if a marriage partner was Jewish, it was grounds for annulling the marriage, although a formal legal basis for such terminations was not created until the Marriage Act enacted in 1938. On the interpretation or reinterpretation of contracts with Jews, it ruled that "the National Socialist worldview requires that only those of German origin (and those legally equal to them) be treated as legally valid in the German Reich". With the ruling, the Reichsgericht adopted the racist subversion of the private law system that was developed by the German legal scholarship of the time, especially by the Kiel School (Kieler Schule). One of its most important representatives, the legal philosopher Karl Larenz, wrote in 1935, just a few months before the judgment was handed down: "A person is only a legal comrade if he is a national comrade; a national comrade is a person of German blood. Those outside the national community are not within the law."

== End of the Reichsgericht ==
Following the collapse of Nazism with the defeat of Germany, the Reichsgericht was dissolved by the Allies in 1945 and was not re-established. The last president of the court, Erwin Bumke, committed suicide two days after the US Army entered Leipzig.

Beginning on 25 August 1945, 39 judges of the Reichsgericht (more than one third of the total staff) were arrested by the NKVD (the Soviet secret service). The four survivors were released between 1950 and 1955; the others had starved to death or died of disease.

Provisional supreme courts were formed in the individual occupation zones. In 1950, the newly established Federal Court of Justice (Bundesgerichtshof) took over the tasks of the Reichsgericht for the Federal Republic of Germany. Former judges of the Reichsgericht were among the first judges in the court. In 1952, the Federal Court of Justice ruled that the Reichsgericht had ceased to exist on 30 October 1945. In the German Democratic Republic, the Supreme Court of East Germany took over the Reichsgericht's duties.

== Building ==
Located in Leipzig, Saxony, Germany, the Reich Court building was designed by Ludwig Hoffmann and Peter Dybwad. Construction was completed in 1895 in Leipzig's new Musikviertel neighbourhood. It is designed in the Italian renaissance style and features two large courtyards, a central cupola and a large portico at the entrance. The rich decorative gable and sculptures are by Otto Lessing. After the German reunification, the former Reichsgericht building was renovated and became the seat of the Bundesverwaltungsgericht (Federal Administrative Court).

== List of presidents ==
No.	Portrait	Name	Took office	Left office	Time in office
1	Eduard von Simson	Eduard von Simson (1810–1899)	1 October 1879	1 February 1891	11 years, 123 days
2	Otto von Oehlschläger	Otto von Oehlschläger (1831–1904)	1 February 1891	1 November 1903	12 years, 273 days
3	Karl Gutbrod	Karl Gutbrod (1844–1905)	1 November 1903	17 April 1905 †	1 year, 167 days
4	Rudolf von Seckendorff [de]	Rudolf von Seckendorff (1844–1932)	18 June 1905	1 January 1920	14 years, 197 days
5	Heinrich Delbrück [de]	Heinrich Delbrück (1855–1922)	1 January 1920	3 July 1922 †	2 years, 183 days
6	Walter Simons	Walter Simons (1861–1937)	16 October 1922	1 April 1929	6 years, 167 days
7	Erwin Bumke	Erwin Bumke (1874–1945)	1 April 1929	20 April 1945 †	16 years, 19 days

== See also ==
- State Court of the German Reich (Staatsgerichtshof)
- Architecture of Leipzig - Reich Court Building
