= President of Germany (1919–1945) =

Head of state under the Weimar Constitution

President of the Reich
- Reichspräsident (German)
- Standard of the President (1933–1935)

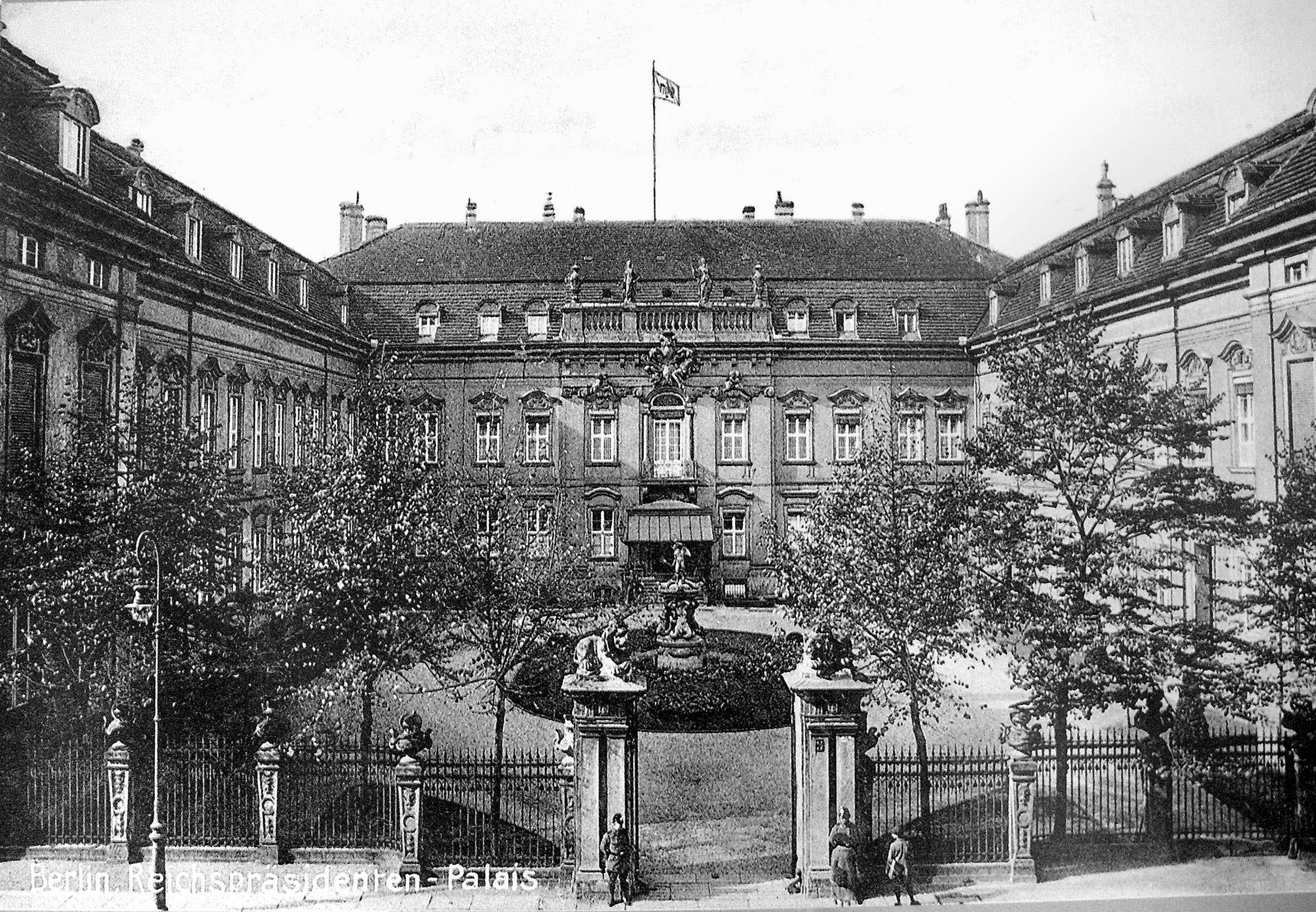
- The Presidential Palace at the Wilhelmstrasse in Berlin
- Style: His Excellency
- Type: Head of state
- Status: Abolished
- Residence: Presidential Palace
- Seat: Berlin, Germany
- Appointer: Direct election; under a two-round system
- Term length: Seven years, with the possibility of indefinite re-election
- Constituting instrument: Weimar constitution
- Precursor: German Emperor
- Formation: 11 February 1919 (first); 30 April 1945 (last)
- First holder: Friedrich Ebert
- Final holder: Paul von Hindenburg (constitutionally); Karl Dönitz (de facto)
- Abolished: 2 August 1934 (Hindenburg's death); 23 May 1945 (Allied dissolution of Flensburg Government)
- Superseded by: Führer (1934–1945); Präsident der Republik (1949–1960); Bundespräsident (from 1949)

The president of Germany (German: Reichspräsident, lit. 'president of the Reich') was the head of state under the Weimar Constitution, which was officially in force from 1919 to 1945, encompassing the periods of the Weimar Republic and Nazi Germany.

The Weimar constitution created a semi-presidential system in which power was divided between president, cabinet and parliament. The president was directly elected under universal adult suffrage for a seven-year term, although Germany's first president, Friedrich Ebert, was elected by the Weimar National Assembly rather than the people. The intention of the framers of the constitution was that the president would rule in conjunction with the Reichstag (legislature) and that his extensive emergency powers would be exercised only in extraordinary circumstances. The political instability of the Weimar period and an increasingly severe factionalism in the legislature, however, led to the president occupying a position of considerable power, legislating by decree and appointing and dismissing governments at will.

In 1934, after the death of President Hindenburg, Adolf Hitler, who was already chancellor, assumed the powers of the presidency as Führer und Reichskanzler ("Leader and Chancellor"). In his last will in April 1945, Hitler named Karl Dönitz president, thus briefly reviving the presidential office until just after the German surrender in May 1945.

The Basic Law for the Federal Republic of Germany established the office of Federal President (Bundespräsident), which is a chiefly ceremonial post largely devoid of political power.

== Constitutional definition ==
The governmental structure established by the Weimar Constitution was a mix of presidential and parliamentary systems, with a strong president as a kind of "replacement emperor" (Ersatzkaiser). Hugo Preuss, who wrote the initial draft of the constitution, intended the president to be above political parties and a counterweight to the Reichstag. He wanted the office to be a block to the "parliamentary absolutism" that he feared might otherwise develop. Preuss' decision to have a president as head of state was influenced by constitutional scholar Robert Redslob and sociologist Max Weber.

The constitution did not require that a vote of no confidence be constructive – that is, the Reichstag had the power to make a government resign without the burden of being sure that a new one could be formed. Friedrich Ebert and Paul von Hindenburg (initially) both attempted to appoint chancellors who were able to build coalitions that had the confidence of the Reichstag. Thirteen of the twenty Weimar governments (not counting Hitler's) were nevertheless minority cabinets when they took office.

=== Election ===
The president was directly elected by universal adult suffrage for a term of seven years. Re-election was not limited. The presidency was open to all German citizens who had reached 36 years of age. The direct election of the president occurred under a form of the two-round system. If no candidate received the support of an absolute majority in the first round of voting, a second round was held at a later date. In that round, the candidate who received the most votes – whether or not it constituted a majority – was elected. A group could nominate a substitute candidate in the second round in place of the candidate it had supported in the first.

The president could not be a member of the Reichstag at the same time. The constitution required that on taking office the president take the following oath:

I swear that I will devote my energy to the welfare of the German people, increase its wellbeing, protect it from harm, uphold the constitution of the Reich and its laws, conscientiously fulfil my duties and exercise justice towards all.

=== Duties and functions ===
Chart of the Weimar Constitution

The requirements and responsibilities of the president were laid out in Section III (Articles 41–59) of the Weimar Constitution.

- Appointment of the government: The president appointed and removed the chancellor and, on the chancellor's recommendation, the members of the cabinet. No vote of confirmation was required in the Reichstag before the members took office, but any member was obliged to resign if the Reichstag passed a vote of no confidence in him. The president could appoint and dismiss the chancellor at will, but all other cabinet members could, except in the event of a no confidence motion, be appointed or dismissed only at the chancellor's request.
- Dissolution of the Reichstag: The president had the right to dissolve the Reichstag at any time (Article 25), in which case a general election had to occur within sixty days. He was not permitted to do so more than once for the same reason.
- Promulgation of the law: The president was responsible for signing bills into law. He was constitutionally obliged to sign every law passed in accordance with the correct procedure but could insist that a bill first be submitted to the electorate in a referendum. Such a referendum could override the decision of the Reichstag only if a majority of eligible voters participated and a majority of them voted yes.
- Foreign relations: The president represented the nation in its foreign affairs, accredited and received ambassadors, and concluded treaties in the name of the state. Approval of the Reichstag was required to declare war, conclude peace and to ratify any treaty that related to German laws.
- Commander-in-chief: The president held supreme command of the armed forces.
- Amnesties: The president had the right to confer amnesties.

==== Emergency powers ====
The Weimar Constitution granted the president sweeping powers in the event of a crisis. If "public order and security [were] seriously disturbed or threatened", Article 48 gave the president the power to "take the necessary measures to restore public safety and order". The permissible steps included the use of armed force, the suspension of many of the civil rights guaranteed by the constitution and forcing a state government to cooperate if it failed to meet its obligations under the constitution or federal law. Most importantly, the president could issue emergency decrees which had the same legal force as laws passed by parliament. Per Article 50, all presidential decrees had to be counter-signed by the chancellor or competent national minister. The Reichstag had to be informed immediately of any measures taken under Article 48 and had the right to reverse any such measures.

=== Removal and succession ===
The Weimar Constitution did not provide for a vice presidency. Article 51 stated that if the president died or left office prematurely, a successor would be elected. During a temporary vacancy, the powers and functions of the presidency passed to the chancellor. A December 1932 constitutional amendment made the president of the Reichsgericht (Germany's highest civil and criminal court) the interim president.

Under Article 43, the president could be removed from office prematurely by a popular referendum initiated by the Reichstag. To require such a referendum, the Reichstag had to pass a motion supported by at least two-thirds of votes cast in the chamber. If the proposal was rejected by voters, the president would be deemed to have been re-elected and the Reichstag would be dissolved.

The Reichstag had authority (Article 59) to impeach the president before the State Court for the German Reich, the court which handled disputes between state bodies. The Reichstag could only do so on a charge of wilfully violating German law. The move to impeach had to be supported by a two-thirds majority of the Reichstag members at a meeting with at least two-thirds of the members present.

== History ==
=== Friedrich Ebert ===
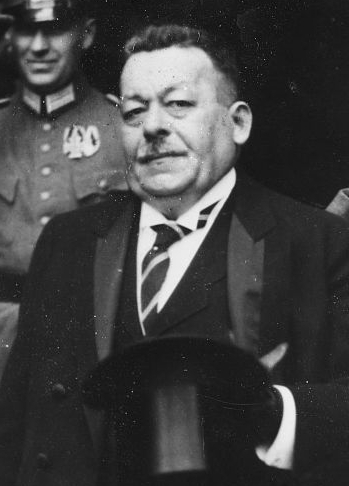
Friedrich Ebert, the first president of Germany

On 11 February 1919, the Weimar National Assembly elected Friedrich Ebert of the Social Democratic Party (SPD) the first Reich president by a vote of 379 to 277. The first regular presidential election was to have taken place when the Weimar Constitution came into effect in August 1919, but the continuing turmoil in the Republic caused the Reichstag to postpone it repeatedly, until in late 1922 it extended Ebert's term to 30 June 1925. The change required amending Article 180 of the constitution.

Due in large part to the ongoing political violence during the early years of the Republic, Ebert used Article 48 on 136 occasions, although he always based invoking the act on agreements between himself, the government and parliament. In October 1923, when the Communist Party of Germany entered the Social Democratic-led governments of Saxony and Thuringia with hidden revolutionary intentions, Ebert used a Reichsexekution under Article 48 to send troops into the two states to remove the Communists from the governments. Ebert later granted Chancellor Wilhelm Cuno considerable latitude under Article 48 to deal with Germany's hyperinflation. It was a more controversial use of the power because it was not clear that the constitutional article was meant to be used to handle economic issues.

There were twelve governments while Ebert was president (six of them minority when they took office) and three Reichstag elections.

=== Paul von Hindenburg ===
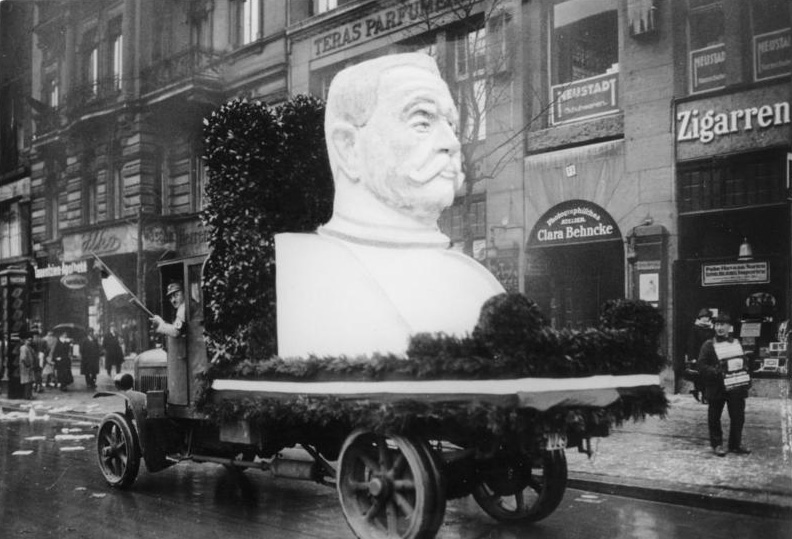
Campaigning for Paul von Hindenburg, right-wing candidate in the second round of 1925

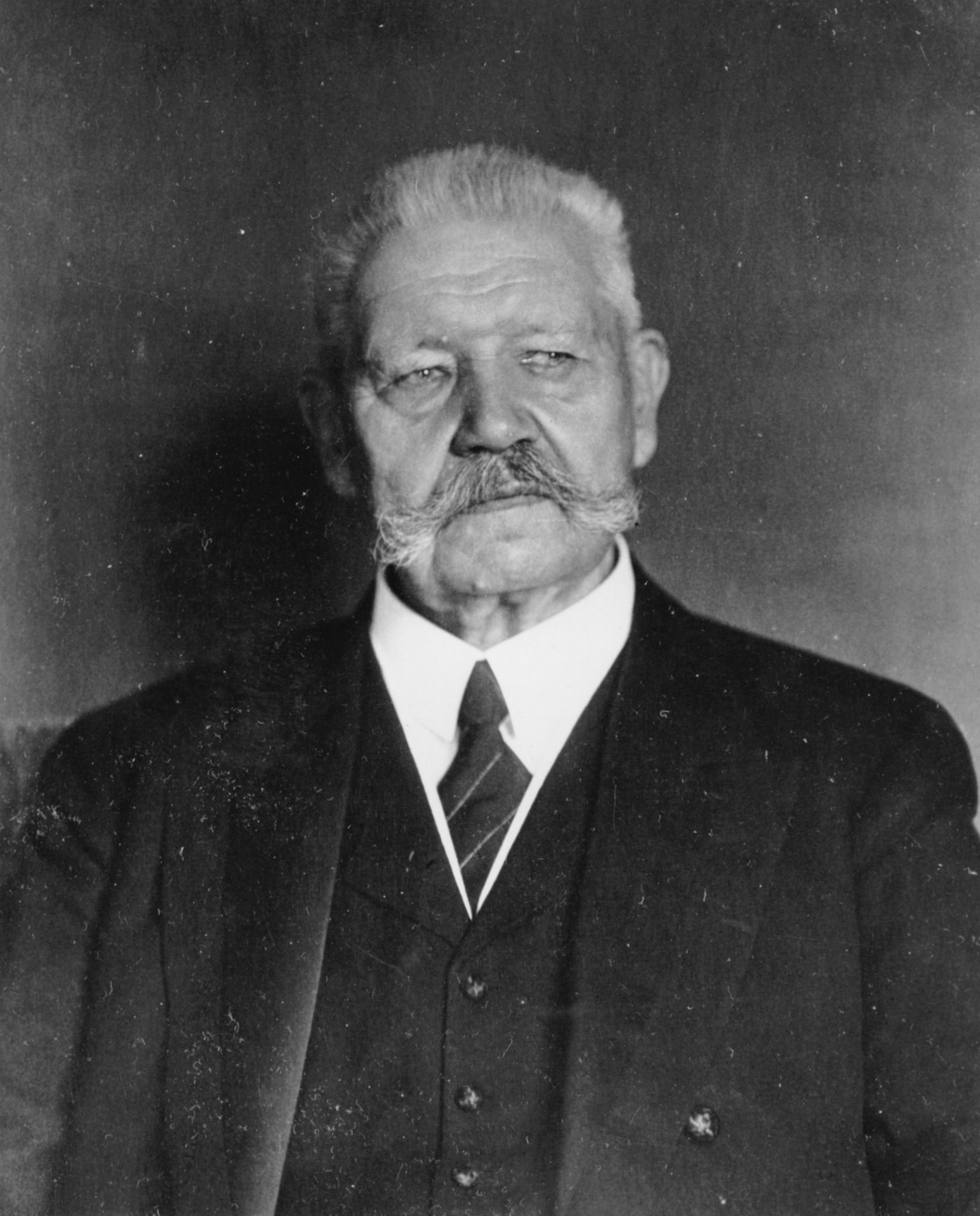
Paul von Hindenburg in 1933

Ebert's presidency ended with his death in February 1925. The election to replace him was held in March and April 1925. After the first ballot did not result in any candidate securing a majority of the votes, the right-wing parties successfully pushed for their first round candidate, Karl Jarres of the German People's Party, to be replaced by World War I Field Marshal Paul von Hindenburg, while the parties of the centre and left united behind Wilhelm Marx of the Centre Party. Hindenburg won a plurality in round two (45%) to become Germany's second president. The decision of the Communist Party of Germany to run their candidate, Ernst Thälmann, in the second round was widely considered to have thrown the election to Hindenburg.

Many on the right hoped that once in office Hindenburg would destroy Weimar democracy from the inside, but he governed within the letter of the Weimar Constitution if not always its spirit. In March 1930 he appointed Heinrich Brüning chancellor after Hermann Müller's government collapsed. In July, when the Reichstag rejected Brüning's budget bill, Hindenburg adopted it by decree and, when the Reichstag reversed the action, he dissolved it. The years that followed saw an explosion of legislation by decree. Hindenburg used Article 48 109 times from 1930 to 1932. The last four cabinets of the Republic (Brüning I and Brüning II, Papen, and Schleicher) are called presidential cabinets because presidential decrees more and more often replaced the Reichstag's legislation. Under Brüning, the Social Democrats, out of fear that the Nazi Party would gain strength if there were another election, tolerated the government by not supporting motions that sought to revoke the decrees, but after Franz von Papen became chancellor in 1932, they refused to do so.

Although he was suffering from the onset of senility, Hindenburg stood for re-election in 1932 with the support of the pro-republican parties, who thought that only he could prevent the election of Adolf Hitler. Hindenburg won the election in the second round with 53% of the vote to Hitler's 37%. In June he replaced Brüning as chancellor with Franz von Papen and dissolved the Reichstag. Papen hoped that the Nazi Party would win the most seats in the new election and allow him to set up an authoritarian government. In the July election, the Nazis, with 37% of the vote, had the most seats of any party in the Reichstag. By two decrees from Hindenburg, Papen dissolved the newly elected Reichstag and suspended elections beyond the constitutionally mandated 60 days. The Communist Party presented a motion of no confidence in the government, and when it passed Papen again called for a new election. Following the November 1932 election in which the Nazi Party's share of the vote slipped to 33%, Papen resigned under pressure from Kurt von Schleicher.

In January 1933, when Schleicher found out that Papen and Hitler were plotting to remove him, he went to Hindenburg to ask for a state of emergency. Hindenburg, out of reluctance to make such a clearly unconstitutional move, refused. With virtually all his support lost, Schleicher resigned on 28 January. Given Germany's continued economic and political instability and under pressure from his advisors, President Hindenburg consented to appoint Adolf Hitler chancellor on 30 January 1933. Hindenburg dissolved the Reichstag on 1 February, and in the election of March 1933, the Nazi Party won only 44% of the vote. With the aid of the major parties except the SPD and KPD – all of whose members, along with 26 from the SPD, were forcibly kept from the chamber – the Nazis were able to command the two-thirds majority necessary to pass the Enabling Act and amend the constitution with the claim of legality. The act gave the chancellor and his cabinet the power to make and enforce laws without the involvement of the parliament or the president. It effectively brought an end to democracy in the German Reich.

=== Adolf Hitler ===
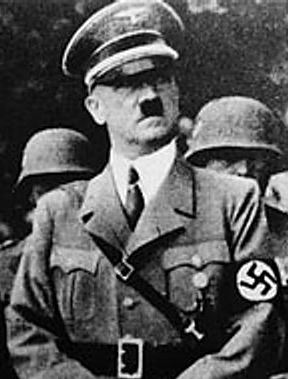
Adolf Hitler, who combined the offices of president and chancellor

On 1 August 1934, Hitler's government issued the "Law Concerning the Head of State of the German Reich", which stated that upon Hindenburg's death (which occurred the next day), the offices of president and chancellor would be merged and held by Hitler. Hitler from then on styled himself Führer und Reichskanzler ("Leader and Chancellor") and did not use the title "Reich President". The law making him head of state was constitutionally dubious since it violated Article 2 of the Enabling Act, which stated that "the rights of the President remain unaffected", although the January 1934 Law on the Reconstruction of the Reich stated that "the Reich Government may issue new constitutional laws". The law was approved by a popular referendum on 19 August.

In his Final Political Testament written just before he committed suicide on 30 April 1945, Hitler split the two offices he had merged, although the act was unconstitutional under Articles 41 and 51 of the Weimar Constitution, which was technically still in effect. Karl Dönitz, who had been appointed president, ordered Germany's military (not political) surrender a few days later. He had by then appointed Ludwig von Krosigk as head of government (chancellor), and the two attempted to form a government at Flensburg. It was not recognised by the Allied powers and was dissolved when its members were arrested by British forces on 23 May at Flensburg.

== List of officeholders ==
† denotes died in office.

Portrait	Reich President	Took office	Left office	Time in office	Party	Election	Cabinet
Friedrich Ebert	Friedrich Ebert (1871–1925)	11 February 1919	28 February 1925 †	6 years, 17 days	SPD	1919	Council of the People's Deputies; Scheidemann cabinet Bauer cabinet First Müller cabinet Fehrenbach cabinet First Wirth cabinet Second Wirth cabinet Cuno cabinet First Stresemann cabinet Second Stresemann cabinet First Marx cabinet Second Marx cabinet First Luther cabinet
Hans Luther	Hans Luther (1879–1962); Acting (Note: Acting president, as chancellor of Germany)	28 February 1925	12 March 1925	12 days	Nonpartisan	–	First Luther cabinet
Walter Simons	Walter Simons (1861–1937); Acting (Note: Acting president, as president of the Reichsgericht)	12 March 1925	12 May 1925	61 days	Nonpartisan	–	First Luther cabinet
Paul von Hindenburg	Generalfeldmarschall; Paul von Hindenburg (1847–1934)	12 May 1925	2 August 1934 †	9 years, 82 days	Nonpartisan	1925; 1932	First Luther cabinet Second Luther cabinet Third Marx cabinet Fourth Marx cabinet Second Müller cabinet First Brüning cabinet Second Brüning cabinet Papen cabinet Schleicher cabinet Hitler cabinet
Adolf Hitler	Führer und Reichkanzler; Adolf Hitler (1889–1945)	2 August 1934	30 April 1945 †	10 years, 271 days	NSDAP	–	Hitler cabinet
Karl Dönitz	Großadmiral; Karl Dönitz (1891–1980)	30 April 1945	23 May 1945	23 days	NSDAP	–	Goebbels cabinet Schwerin von Krosigk cabinet

== Presidential standards ==
1919–1921

1921–1926

1926–1933

1933–1934 (de jure abolished in 1935)

Personal standard of Adolf Hitler (1934–1945)

Standard of the Grand Admiral used by Karl Dönitz (1945)

== See also ==
- President of Germany
- List of presidents of Germany
- Politics of Germany
- History of Germany
