= Law to Secure the Unity of Party and State =

1933 Nazi German law

- Reichsadler of the Weimar Republic, from 1933 to 1935

Hitler cabinet
- Citation: RGBl. 1933 I p. 1016
- Enacted by: Hitler cabinet
- Signed by: Adolf Hitler, Reich Chancellor; Wilhelm Frick, Interior Minister
- Signed: 1 December 1933
- Commenced: 3 December 1933
- Repealed: 20 September 1945

Repealed by
- Control Council Law No. 1
- Status: Repealed

The Law to Secure the Unity of Party and State (German: Gesetz zur Sicherung der Einheit von Partei und Staat), sometimes translated as the Law to Safeguard the Unity of Party and State, was a statute enacted by the government of Nazi Germany on 1 December 1933 that established a close interconnection between the Nazi Party (including its paramilitary wing, the Sturmabteilung, or SA) and the governmental apparatus of Germany.

== Background ==
After the Nazi seizure of power on 30 January 1933, Adolf Hitler quickly set about taking control of all aspects of the German government and society. One of his first acts was to engineer passage of the Enabling Act through the Reichstag on 23 March 1933. This empowered the "Reich government" (i.e., the Reich Chancellor and his cabinet) to enact laws for a period of four years without submitting them for passage and approval to the Reichstag or the Reich President.

Armed with these sweeping new emergency powers, Hitler used them to enact a series of laws aimed at establishing his dictatorial control. One means to this end was to eliminate all opposition parties, ensuring that the Nazi Party had complete dominance over the politics of the nation. Hitler began by unleashing a campaign of intimidation and terror by the SA. The earliest victims were the Nazis' fiercest opponents, first the Communist Party and then the Social Democratic Party. Between March and June 1933, their Reichstag deputies were banned from taking their seats, and many were arrested. Their offices were raided, their assets were seized and their publications banned. Thousands of party functionaries were arrested, assaulted, tortured and confined in prisons or concentration camps and the parties were hounded out of existence.

By early July, all other parties, representing the broad German middle class, had been intimidated into dissolving themselves rather than face arrest and imprisonment. The Reich government then enacted the Law Against the Formation of Parties on 14 July 1933. This declared the NSDAP the country's only legal political party, and mandated imprisonment for anyone supporting or seeking to establish another party organization; the Nazi Party stood alone and a one-party state was established. Hitler now sought to extend the Party's grasp over all the levers of state power and administration. The vehicle chosen was the Law to Secure the Unity of Party and State, which was enacted by the Reich government under the provisions of the Enabling Act on 1 December 1933.

== Text ==
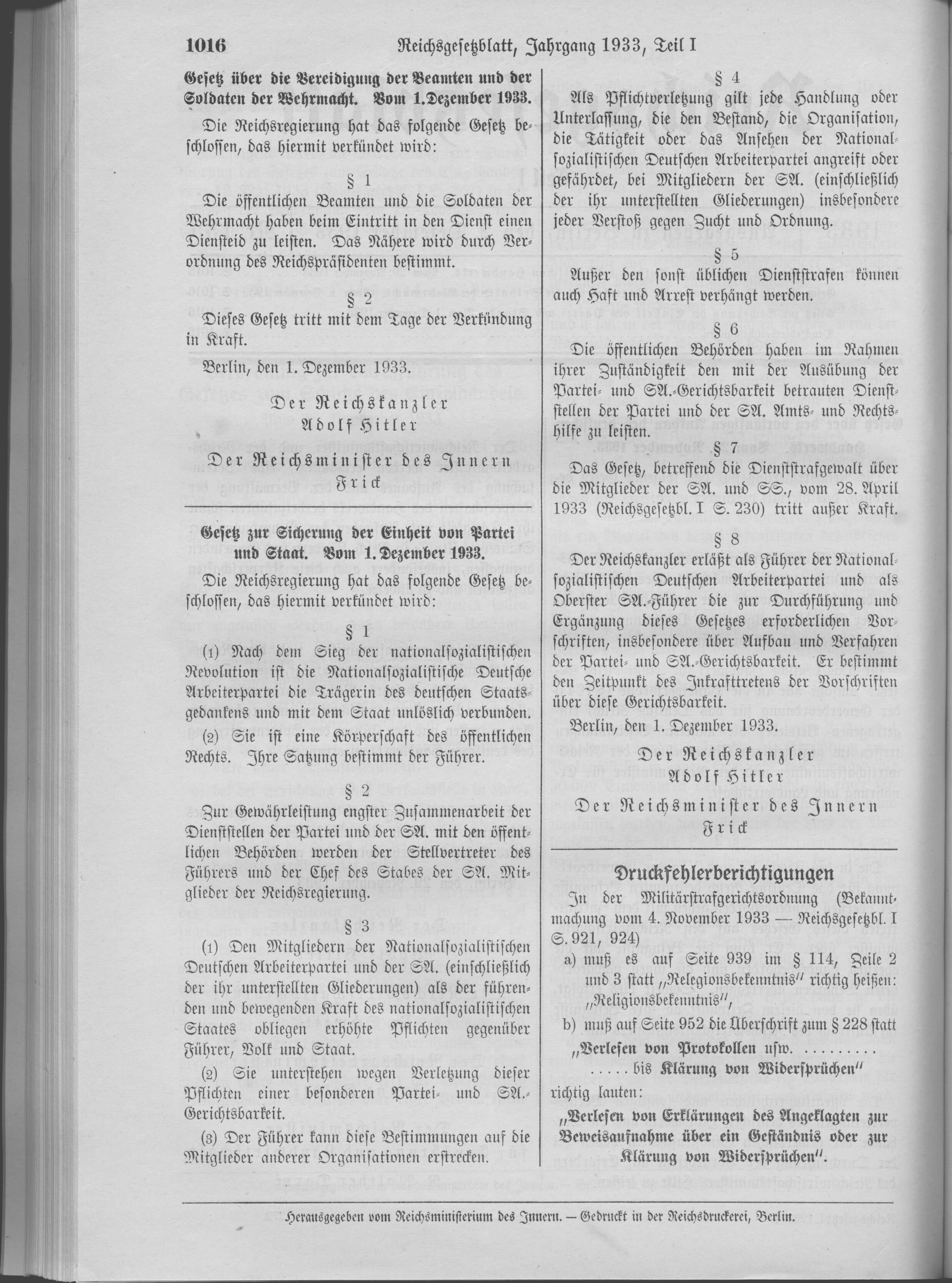
Promulgation of the Law to Secure the Unity of Party and State in the Reichsgesetzblatt of 2 December 1933

Law to Secure the Unity of Party and State

1 December 1933

The Reich Government has passed the following law, which is hereby promulgated:

§ 1

(1) After the victory of the National Socialist revolution, the National Socialist German Workers' Party is the bearer of the concept of the German state and is inseparable from the state.

(2) It is a corporation under public law. The Führer determines its statutes.

§ 2

To ensure the closest cooperation between the offices of the Party and the SA with the public authorities, the Deputy Führer and the Chief of Staff of the SA become members of the Reich government.

§ 3

(1) The members of the National Socialist German Workers' Party and the SA (including the structures subordinate to it) as the leading and driving force of the National Socialist state will bear greater responsibilities towards the Führer, people and state.

(2) In case they violate these duties, they will be subject to a special Party and SA jurisdiction.

(3) The Führer can extend these provisions to the members of other organizations.

§ 4

Any action or omission by members of the SA (including the structures subordinate to it) that attacks or endangers the existence, organization, activity or reputation of the National Socialist German Workers' Party, in particular any breach of discipline and order, will be considered a breach of duty.

§ 5

In addition to the usual penalties, imprisonment and arrest can also be imposed.

§ 6

Within the scope of their competence, the public authorities have to provide legal and administrative assistance to the officers of the Party and the SA entrusted with the exercise of jurisdiction over the Party and SA.

§ 7

The law concerning the power to impose penalties on members of the SA and SS, dated 28 April 1933 (Reichsgesetzblatt I p. 230) is invalidated.

§ 8

The Reich Chancellor, as the Führer of the National Socialist German Workers' Party and as the supreme leader of the SA, will issue the regulations necessary for the implementation and supplementation of this law, in particular with regard to the expansion and procedures of Party and SA jurisdiction. He will determine the date of entry into force of the regulations governing that jurisdiction.

Berlin, 1 December 1933

The Reich Chancellor Adolf Hitler

The Reich Minister of the Interior Frick

== Effects ==
The law was published in the Reichsgesetzblatt on 2 December 1933 and came into effect the following day. It significantly increased the Party's influence over Reich governmental functions, particularly in the area of jurisprudence.

- The Nazi Party was legally established as a public corporation with jurisdiction over its members.
- The Deputy Führer of the Party (Rudolf Hess) and the Stabschef of the SA (Ernst Röhm), were made ex officio members of the Reich government, as ministers without portfolio. This had the effect of bolstering the prestige of these institutions and further interlocking the leadership of the Party and State. In the case of the SA, it mollified a long-standing grievance with Röhm.
- Government agencies, including public safety and law enforcement authorities such as the police, public prosecutors and the courts, were obligated to provide the Party and the SA with administrative and legal information and investigatory assistance.
- Party courts (Parteigerichte) received the status of official legal institutions of the State and any crime committed against the Party now was considered a crime against the State. These courts now also could impose detention or imprisonment as punishment, whereas they previously could not. Though the Party courts very rarely ordered arrest and imprisonment, they worked closely with the State authorities and, following expulsion from the Party, arrest and State trial soon followed. The law also authorized the Party courts to punish government employees who were Party members. This exposed them to a type of double jeopardy, by which Party members expelled or punished by the Party courts would almost automatically face removal from their civil service position. Conversely, Party members convicted of crimes in the State courts could be brought before the Party courts, tried for "bringing injury to the Party" and expelled.
- The law specifically applied to the SA and "the structures subordinate to it," meaning that it also encompassed the Schutzstaffel (SS) and the National Socialist Motor Corps (NSKK).
- The law did not lead to a smoother government administration but, rather, contributed to "continual skirmishing" between the organs of Party and State, with Nazi Party functionaries interfering with government policy and decision-making at every level.
- Contemporaneous commentaries of the law's effects stated:

Chancellor Adolf Hitler's brownshirt army became an official organ of the German Reich today … a corporation of public law with its own jurisdiction over its members, similar to the jurisdiction possessed by the army and the bureaucracy over their members. … the law puts the Nazi party and Storm Troops on the same basis as the army, police and government officials with public and legal functions to perform.

The Act on the Unity of Party and State of December 1, 1933 established by force of law the monopoly of the National Socialist Party within the state. The party was declared a public corporation and given far-reaching privileges of exemption from the general laws. The unofficial special courts for party members were legally recognized as judicial agencies of the state; the ordinary authorities of the state were bound to assist party officials in the exercise of their functions. … In addition to the party proper and its affiliated organizations … the party touches with its countless professional and social groups of vast dimensions all layers of the population. … The party and its affiliated organizations enjoy the special protection of the law. … co-ordinating party officials with the administrative offices of the state.

== Repeal ==
Following the end of World War II in Europe and the fall of the Nazi regime, the Law Securing the Unity of Party and State was one of twenty-five specified Nazi-era laws repealed on 20 September 1945 by Control Council Law No. 1.

== See also ==
- Gleichschaltung
- Uschla/Supreme Party Court

== Sources ==
- Broszat, Martin (1987). Hitler and the Collapse of Weimar Germany. Berg Publishers Ltd. ISBN 978-0-854-96517-5.
- Bullock, Alan (1962). Hitler: A Study in Tyranny. New York: Harper Torchbooks. ISBN 978-0-060-92020-3.
- Childers, Thomas (2017). The Third Reich: A History of Nazi Germany. New York: Simon & Schuster. ISBN 978-1-45165-113-3.
- Evans, Richard J. (2005). The Coming of the Third Reich. New York: Penguin Books. ISBN 978-0-143-03469-8.
- Evans, Richard J. (2006). The Third Reich in Power. New York: Penguin Books. ISBN 978-0-143-03790-3.
- McKale, Donald M. (1974). The Nazi Party Courts: Hitler's Management of Conflict in His Movement, 1921-1945. University Press of Kansas. ISBN 0-7006-0122-8.
- Zentner, Christian; Bedürftig, Friedemann, eds. (1997) [1991]. The Encyclopedia of the Third Reich. New York: Da Capo Press. ISBN 978-0-306-80793-0.
