= Control Council Law No. 1 – Repealing of Nazi Laws =

Law enacted in post-war Germany repealing laws enacted by the Nazi regime

The Control Council Law No. 1 – Repealing of Nazi Laws (German: Kontrollratsgesetz Nr. 1 betreffend die Aufhebung von NS-Recht, short form: Kontrollratsgesetz Nr. 1) was a law enacted by the Allied Control Council for post–World War II Germany on 20 September 1945.

== Description ==
The law repealed numerous pieces of legislation enacted by the Nazi regime. It also prohibited the application of any German law that would discriminate against any person based on their race, nationality, religious beliefs, or opposition to the NSDAP. Similar guarantees were included in the Basic Law for the Federal Republic of Germany and, to a lesser extent, the original Constitution of East Germany.

The repeal of the Enabling Act of 1933 meant that the Weimar Constitution was re-established in theory, but that constitution remained irrelevant on the grounds that the Allied Control Council acted as occupying forces. Further denazification of German legislation was carried out in the following years.

== Text ==
The official text of the law was in the three languages of the occupying forces, although a non-binding German translation was provided. Signatories for the occupying forces were Bernard L. Montgomery (British), Louis Koeltz (French), Vassily Sokolovsky (Soviet) and Dwight D. Eisenhower (American).

== Fate of this law ==
In the Federal Republic of Germany the law became defunct with the First Law for Repealing Occupying Forces Legislation (Erstes Gesetz zur Aufhebung des Besatzungsrechts) (BGBl. I p. 437) on 30 May 1955, with the previously repealed Nazi legislation staying invalid.

For the German Democratic Republic, the Council of Ministers of the Soviet Union repealed the law on 20 September 1955.

== Explicitly repealed laws ==
- Law to Remedy the Distress of People and Reich (Enabling Act) of 24 March 1933 (RGBl. I p. 41),
- Law for the Reconstitution of Officialdom of 7 April 1933 (RGBl. I p. 175),
- Law for the Amendment of the Provisions of Criminal Law and Procedure of 24 April 1934 (RGBl. I p. 341),
- Law for the Protection of National Symbols of 19 May 1933 (RGBl. I p. 285),
- Law Against the Formation of Parties of 14 July 1933 (RGBl. I S. 479),
- Law on Plebiscites of 14 July 1933 (RGBl. I p. 479),
- Law to Secure the Unity of Party and State of 1 December 1933 (RGBl. I p. 1016),
- Law Concerning Insidious Attacks Against the State and the Party and for the Protection of the Party Uniform and Insignia of 20 December 1934 (RGBl. I p. 1269),
- Reich Flag Law of 15 September 1935 (RGBl. I p. 1145),
- Law for the Protection of German Blood and German Honour of 15 September 1935 (RGBl. I p. 1146),
- Reich Citizen Law of 15 September 1935 (RGBl. I p. 1146),
- Prussian Law Concerning the Gestapo of 10 February 1936 (PreußGS. p. 21),
- Hitler Youth Law of 1 December 1936 (RGBl. I p. 933),
- Ordinance Against Support for the Camouflaging of Jewish Businesses of 22 April 1938 (RGBl. I p. 404),
- Ordinance for the Reporting of Property of Jews of 26 April 1938 (RGBl. I p. 414),
- Law Concerning the Alteration of the Trade Regulations for the Reich of 6 July 1938 (RGBl. I p. 823),
- Second Carrying Out Ordinance of the Law Concerning the Changing of Family Names and Christian Names of 17 August 1938 (RGBl. I p. 1044),
- Ordinance Concerning the Passports of Jews of 5 October 1938 (RGBl. I p. 1342),
- Ordinance for the Elimination of Jews from Economic Life of 12 November 1938 (RGBl. I p. 1580),
- Police Ordinance Concerning the Appearance of Jews in Public of 28 November 1938 (RGBl. I p. 1676),
- Ordinance Concerning Proof of German Descent of 1 August 1940 (RGBl. I p. 1063),
- Police Ordinance Concerning the Marking of Jews of 1 September 1941 (RGBl. I p. 547),
- Ordinance Concerning the Employment of Jews of 3 October 1941 (RGBl. I p. 675),
- Decree of the Führer Concerning the Legal Status of the NSDAP of 12 December 1942 (RGBl. I p. 733),
- Police Ordinance Concerning the Identification of Male and Female Workers from the East on Reich Territory of 19 June 1944 (RGBl. I p. 147).

== Implicitly repealed laws ==
- Law Concerning the Repealment of Naturalisation and Revocation of German Citizenship of 14 July 1933 (RGBl. I S. 480),
- Law Concerning the Admission to the Bar of 7 April 1933 (RGBl. I S. 188).
