= Potsdam Day =

1933 ceremony for the opening of the new Reichstag in Germany

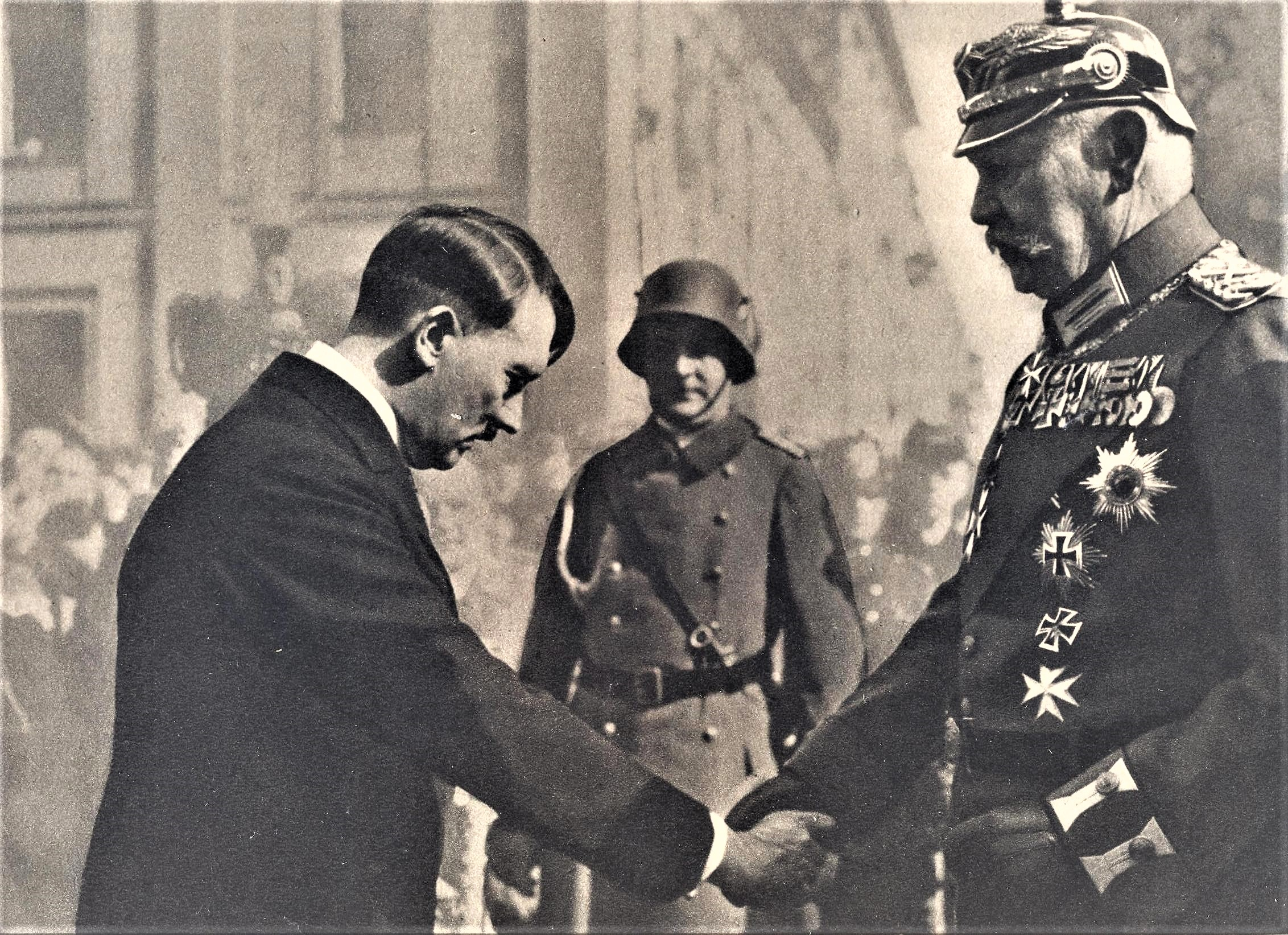
Reichskanzler Adolf Hitler and Reichspräsident Paul von Hindenburg on Potsdam Day

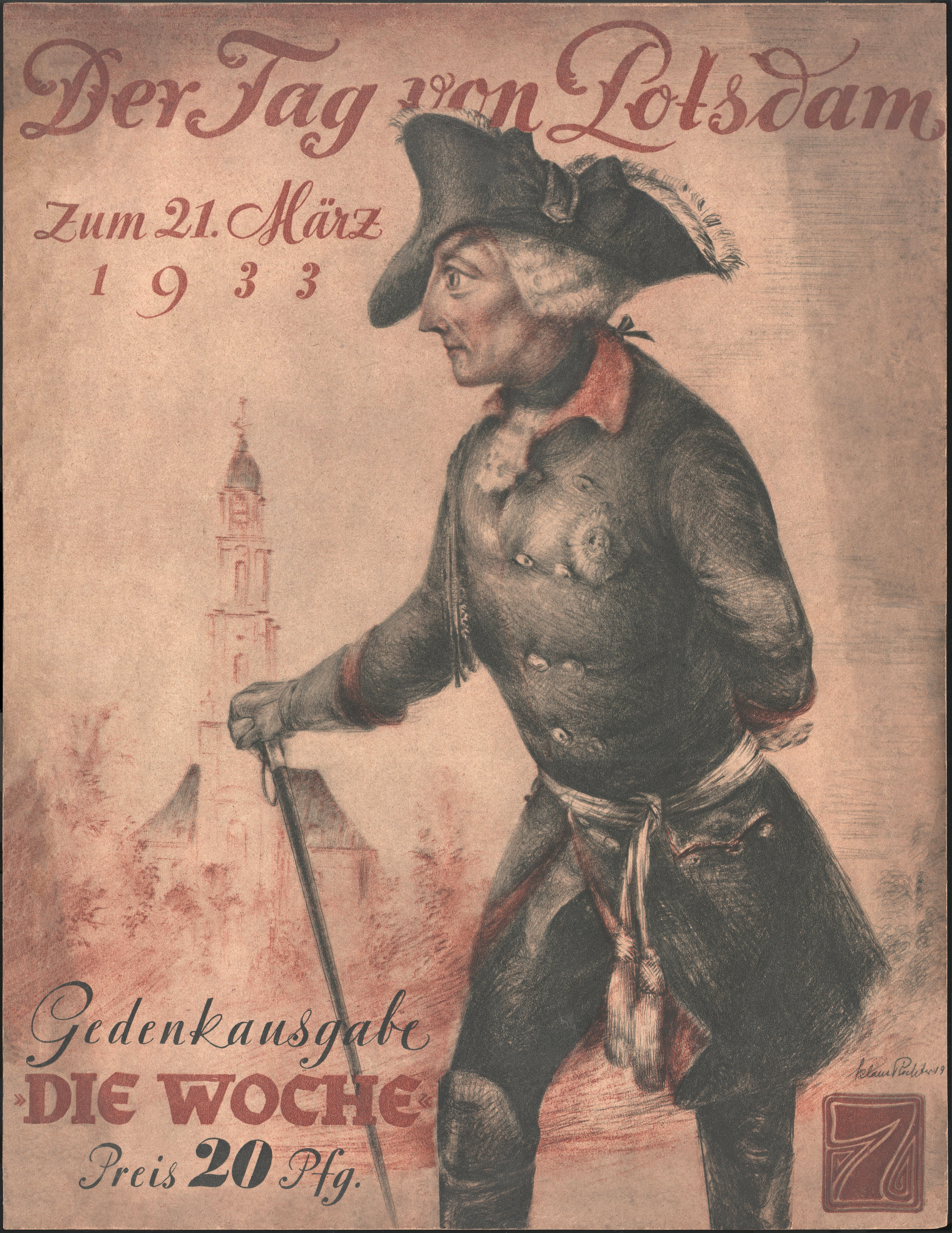
Cover of the special edition Der Tag von Potsdam in the weekly newspaper Die Woche

Potsdam Day, also known as the Tag von Potsdam or Potsdam Celebration, was a ceremony for the re-opening of the Reichstag following the Reichstag fire, held on 21 March 1933, shortly after that month's German federal election.

== Selection of site and date ==
Adolf Hitler and Joseph Goebbels selected the site of Potsdam, as it was the centre of the old Kingdom of Prussia of Frederick the Great, as well as the German Empire of Otto von Bismarck. The date was chosen because 21 March 1871 was when the first Reichstag of Imperial Germany opened.

== Attendees ==
Among the attendees were Crown Prince Wilhelm, guest of honour and representative of the Hohenzollern dynasty, and his three surviving brothers Prince Eitel Friedrich and Prince Oskar, both Der Stahlhelm members, and Prince August Wilhelm, an Oberführer in the SA, the Nazi stormtroopers. Prince Adalbert was the only brother who did not attend the ceremony.

== Broadcasting on radio ==
Broadcast in its entirety on radio, the festivities began with religious services. Protestant members of the Reichstag, including Chairman Hermann Göring, held services at the Church of Saint Nicholas presided over by Otto Dibelius. Catholics held services in Peter and Paul Church. Neither Hitler nor Goebbels attended the religious services, instead placing wreaths on the graves of various Nazi "martyrs", including Horst Wessel, but attended a later state ceremony at the Garrison Church. Speeches were made by Reich President Paul von Hindenburg and Hitler, the new Reich Chancellor, who had been in office less than two months, after which the two had a solemn handshake, symbolizing the "marriage of the old grandeur and new power". Famously, Hitler, who was dressed in civilian clothes, bowed his head deeply during the handshake with Hindenburg, who was wearing his full military uniform. Hindenburg laid a wreath at the tomb of Frederick the Great.

== Parades ==
Afterwards, parades were held with the participation of the Reichswehr, SA, SS, Stahlhelm, and others. Finally the deputies convened the new Reichstag at the Kroll Opera House, as the original Reichstag Building had been rendered unusable by the fire. That evening, celebrations ended with a torchlight parade and a performance of Richard Wagner's Die Meistersinger von Nürnberg at the Berlin State Opera with Hitler in attendance.

== Commemorative coins ==
A year later, two- and five-Reichsmark coins showing the church and the date "21 März 1933" were minted. They are not rare, but larger numbers of both denominations were also issued in 1934–1935 without the commemorative date.

== See also ==
- 23 March 1933 Reichstag speech
- Adolf Hitler's rise to power
- Enabling Act of 1933
- Gleichschaltung
- Reichstag fire
