= Law Against the Formation of Parties =

1933 German law that established the Nazi Party

- Reichsadler of the Weimar Republic, from 1928 to 1935

Hitler cabinet
- Citation: RGBl. 1933 I p. 479
- Enacted by: Hitler cabinet
- Signed by: Reich Chancellor Adolf Hitler
- Signed: 14 July 1933
- Commenced: 14 July 1933
- Repealed: 20 September 1945

Repealed by
- Control Council Law No. 1
- Status: Repealed

The Law Against the Formation of Parties (German: Gesetz gegen die Neubildung von Parteien), sometimes translated as the Law Against the Founding of New Parties, was a measure enacted by the government of Nazi Germany on 14 July 1933 that established the Nazi Party (NSDAP) as the de jure only political party in Germany.

== Background ==
After the Nazi seizure of power on 30 January 1933, Adolf Hitler quickly set about taking control of all aspects of the German government and society. One of his first acts was to engineer passage of the Enabling Act through the Reichstag on 23 March 1933. This empowered the "Reich government" (i.e., the Reich Chancellor and his cabinet) to enact laws for a period of four years without submitting them for passage and approval to the Reichstag or the Reich President. Reduced to insignificance, the Reichstag would only pass seven laws over the next nine years. Armed with these sweeping new emergency powers, Hitler used them to enact a series of laws aimed at establishing his dictatorial control over the nation. One means to this end was to eliminate all opposition parties and ensure that the Nazi Party had complete dominance over the politics of the nation.

By the provisions enacted in the Reichstag Fire Decree, many civil liberties guaranteed to German citizens by the Weimar Constitution had been suspended, including the right of habeas corpus, and freedom of speech, the press and assembly. A campaign of intimidation and terror was then waged by the Nazi Sturmabteilung (SA), the Party's paramilitary force. The blows fell first on their fiercest opponent, the Communist Party (KPD), whose Reichstag deputies were banned from taking their seats, and most of whom were arrested and taken to concentration camps. The KPD had effectively been outlawed in all but name by the Reichstag Fire Decree, and was completely banned from 6 March 1933.

Following additional months of violence and intimidation against the Social Democratic Party (SPD), the government seized all its assets on 10 May 1933. On 22 June, they banned all Social Democratic publications and meetings, and canceled all SPD electoral mandates in both the Reichstag and the state Landtage (parliaments). Membership in the SPD was declared incompatible with holding public office or a civil service position. All over Germany, three thousand party functionaries were arrested, assaulted, tortured and confined in prisons or concentration camps. The SPD was effectively hounded out of existence.

By early July, all other parties, representing the broad German middle class, had been intimidated into dissolving themselves rather than face arrest and imprisonment. All the major parties of the Weimar Republic formally disbanded within the span of about a week: the German National People's Party, the Nazis' coalition partner (27 June), the German State Party (28 June), the Centre Party (3 July), the Bavarian People's Party (4 July) and the German People's Party (4 July).

Ensuring that the Nazi Party's hegemony was enshrined in law, the Reich government then enacted the Law Against the Formation of Parties on 14 July 1933. It declared the NSDAP the country's only legal political party, and mandated a punishment of imprisonment for anyone supporting or seeking to establish another party organization.

== Text ==
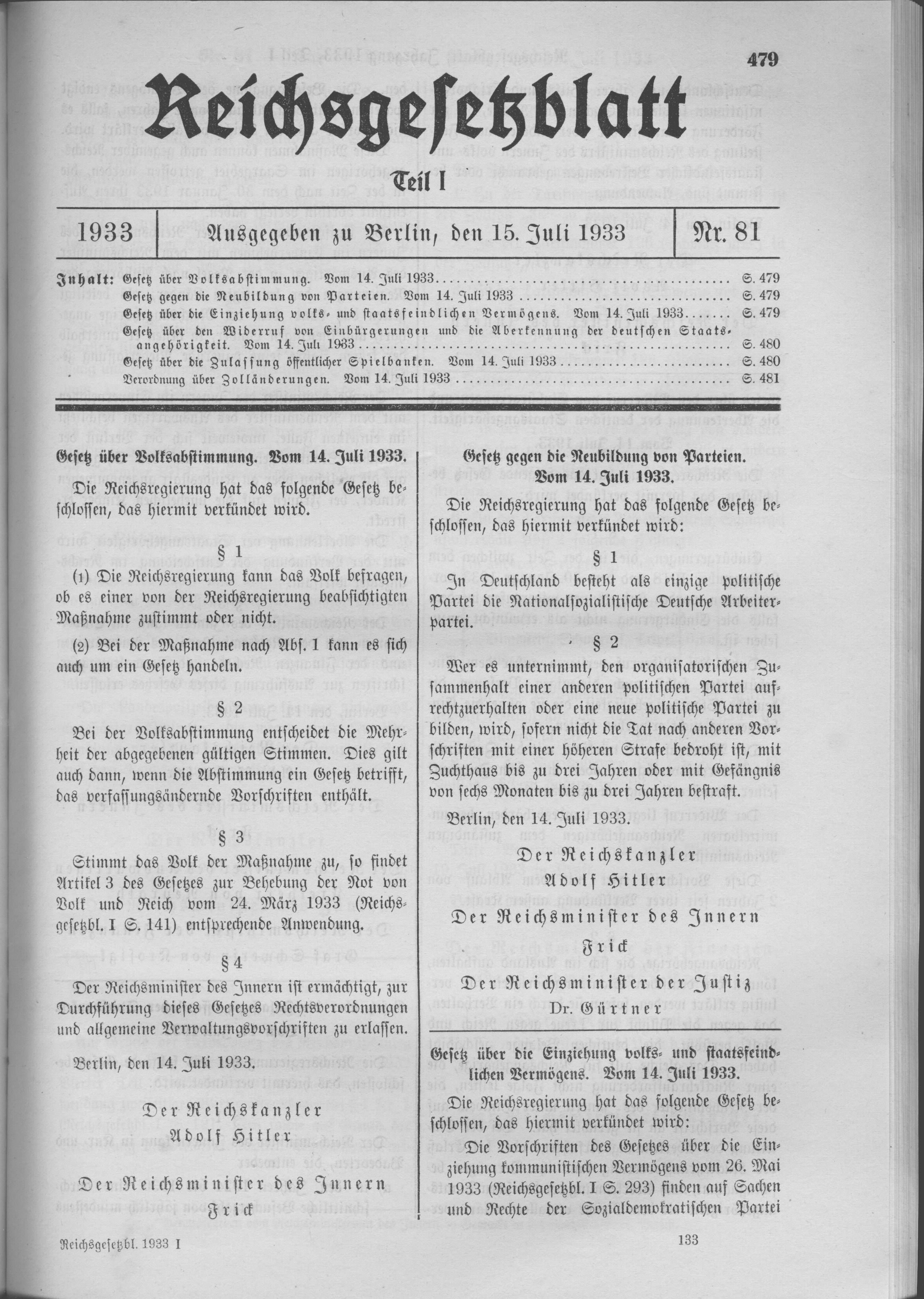
Promulgation of the Law Against the Formation of Parties in the Reichsgesetzblatt of 15 July 1933

German	English
Gesetz gegen die Neubildung von Parteien	Law Against the Formation of Parties
Die Reichsregierung hat das folgende Gesetz beschlossen, das hiermit verkündet wird:	The Reich Government has passed the following law, which is hereby promulgated:
1. In Deutschland besteht als einzige politische Partei die Nationalsozialistische Deutsche Arbeiterpartei.	1. The only political party in Germany is the National Socialist German Workers' Party.
2. Wer es unternimmt, den organisatorischen Zusammenhalt einer anderen politischen Partei aufrechtzuerhalten oder eine neue politische Partei zu bilden, wird, sofern nicht die Tat nah anderen Vorschriften mit einer höheren Strafe bedroht ist, mit Zuchthaus bis zu drei Jahren oder mit Gefängnis vor sechs Monaten bis zu drei Jahren bestraft.	2. Whoever attempts to maintain the organizational cohesion of another political party or to form a new political party shall, unless the act is punishable by a more severe penalty under other provisions, be punished with penal servitude for a term not exceeding three years or with imprisonment for a term not exceeding six months.
Der Reichskanzler, Adolf Hitler; Der Reichsminister des Innern, Frick; Der Reichsminister der Justiz, Dr. Gürtner	Reich Chancellor Adolf Hitler; Reich Minister of the Interior [Wilhelm] Frick; Reich Minister of Justice Dr. [Franz] Gürtner

== Effects ==
The law formalized what had already been accomplished through the campaign of Nazi terror and the complete capitulation of the opposition: it legalized a one-party state in Germany that would last for twelve years. At the subsequent Reichstag election of 12 November 1933, all 661 seats were won by the Nazi Party. The Reichstag, once the scene of democratic debate and deliberation, was reduced to a forum where Hitler would deliver speeches and other political pronouncements to a docile audience, and where the occasional piece of legislation was adopted by acclamation.

== Repeal ==
After the fall of the Nazi regime at the end of the Second World War in Europe, the Allied occupation authorities set about to "denazify" German law. Accordingly, Control Council Law No. 1 (20 September 1945), overturned twenty-five specifically enumerated Nazi laws or regulations, among them the Enabling Act and the Law Against the Formation of Parties. As political freedom was restored in the American, British and French occupation zones, many of the former Weimar parties reestablished themselves, including the Communist Party, the Social Democratic Party and the Centre Party.

== See also ==
- Gleichschaltung

== Sources ==
- Broszat, Martin (1981). The Hitler State: The Foundation and Development of the Internal Structure of the Third Reich. New York: Longman Inc. ISBN 978-0-582-48997-4.
- Childers, Thomas (2017). The Third Reich: A History of Nazi Germany. New York: Simon & Schuster. ISBN 978-1-45165-113-3.
- Evans, Richard J. (2005). The Coming of the Third Reich. New York: Penguin Books. ISBN 978-0-143-03469-8.
- Noakes, Jeremy; Pridham, Geoffrey, eds. (1998) [1983]. Nazism 1919-1945, Volume 1: The Rise to Power 1919-1934. University of Exeter Press. ISBN 0-85989 598 X.
- Shirer, William (1960). The Rise and Fall of the Third Reich. New York: Simon and Schuster. ISBN 978-0-831-77404-2.
