= Enabling Act of 1933 =

Override of German constitution by Nazis

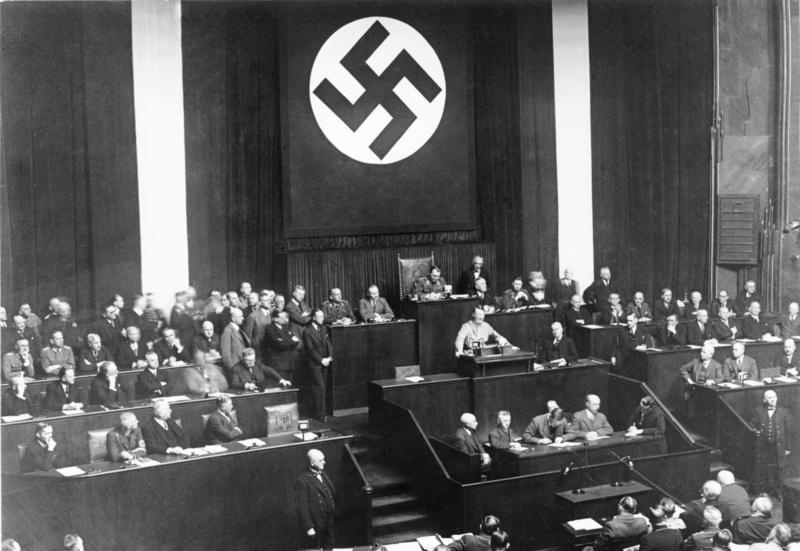
- Hitler's Reichstag speech promoting the bill; Because of the Reichstag fire, the meeting was held at the Kroll Opera House

Reichstag
- Long title: Law to Remedy the Distress of People and Reich
- Territorial extent: Weimar Republic → Nazi Germany
- Enacted by: Reichstag
- Enacted by: Reichsrat
- Signed by: President Paul von Hindenburg
- Signed: 23 March 1933
- Commenced: 23 March 1933
- Repealed: 20 September 1945

Legislative history

Initiating chamber: Reichstag
- Introduced by: Hitler cabinet
- Passed: 23 March 1933
- Voting summary: 444 voted for; 94 voted against; 109 absent

Revising chamber: Reichsrat
- Passed: 23 March 1933
- Voting summary: 66 voted for; None voted against

Repealed by
- Control Council Law No. 1 – Repealing of Nazi Laws
- Status: Repealed

The Enabling Act of 1933 (German: Ermächtigungsgesetz, officially titled Gesetz zur Behebung der Not von Volk und Reich lit. 'Law to Remedy the Distress of People and Reich') was a law that gave the German Cabinet—most importantly, the chancellor, Adolf Hitler—the power to make and enforce laws without the involvement of the Reichstag or President Paul von Hindenburg. By allowing the chancellor to override the checks and balances in the constitution, the Enabling Act of 1933 was a pivotal step in the transition from the democratic Weimar Republic to the totalitarian dictatorship of Nazi Germany.

== Background ==
On 30 January 1933, Adolf Hitler, leader of the Nazi Party (NSDAP), was appointed Chancellor, the head of the German government. Hitler immediately asked President von Hindenburg to dissolve the Reichstag. A general election was scheduled for 5 March 1933.

=== Reichstag fire ===
On 27 February 1933, the Reichstag building of the German parliament caught fire. Acting as chancellor, Hitler immediately accused the communists of perpetrating the arson as part of a larger effort to overthrow the German government. He persuaded Hindenburg to enact the Reichstag Fire Decree, which abolished most civil liberties, including the right to speak, assemble and protest, and the right to due process. A state of emergency was declared on the basis of the decree, which enabled a violent crackdown against the Nazis' political enemies, in particular the Communist Party.

Amid the ongoing repression, Hitler contended that the Reichstag Fire Decree was nonetheless insufficient and demanded a more sweeping measure. He submitted to the Reichstag a proposal for an enabling law that would grant effectively untrammeled power to his cabinet.

=== March 1933 election ===
For the general election of 5 March 1933, the Nazis were allied with other nationalist and conservative factions. At a secret meeting on 20 February, major German industrialists had agreed to finance the Nazis' election campaign. The main residual opposition was the Social Democrats. On election day Germans voted in an atmosphere of extreme voter intimidation, perpetrated mainly by the Nazi Sturmabteilung (SA) militia.

The NSDAP emerged from the election with five million more votes than in the previous election, but failed to gain an absolute majority in parliament. It remained dependent on the 8% of seats won by its coalition partner, the German National People's Party (DNVP), to attain a 52% majority.

In the first post-election cabinet meeting on 7 March, Hitler declared his intention to pass an Enabling Act in the form of a constitutional amendment that would enable the cabinet to bypass the Reichstag and the president in order to promulgate laws on its own.

== Preparations and negotiations ==
The Enabling Act would allow the National Ministry (essentially the cabinet) to enact legislation, including laws deviating from or altering the constitution, without the consent of the Reichstag, for a period of four years. The law was thus itself considered a constitutional amendment. It therefore required a two-thirds super-majority support from a quorum of at least two-thirds of all members of the Reichstag.

Despite the elimination of the Communists and heavy pressure on the rest of the opposition, the bill's passage was not a certainty. To pass it, the Nazis used a strategy of coercion, bribery, and manipulation of parliamentarians.

The Social Democrats and the Communists were expected to vote against. The government had already arrested all Communist and some Social Democrat deputies under the Reichstag Fire Decree. The conservative parties representing the middle class, the Junkers and business interests were expected to vote for the law.

A two-thirds majority would therefore be in reach with the votes of the Catholic Centre Party. Hitler negotiated with the Centre Party's chairman, Ludwig Kaas, a Catholic priest, and finalized an agreement on 22 March. Kaas agreed to support the law in exchange for assurances of his party's continued existence, the protection of Catholic civil liberties and Catholic schools, and the retention of civil servants affiliated with the party.

Some historians, such as Klaus Scholder, have maintained that Hitler also promised to negotiate a Reichskonkordat with the Holy See, a treaty that formalized the position of the Catholic Church in Germany on a national level. Kaas was a close associate of Cardinal Pacelli, then Vatican Secretary of State (and later Pope Pius XII). Pacelli had been pursuing a German concordat as a key policy for some years, but the instability of Weimar governments, as well as the opposition of some parties to a treaty, had blocked the project. The day after the Enabling Act vote, Kaas went to Rome in order to, in his own words, "investigate the possibilities for a comprehensive understanding between church and state".

== Text ==
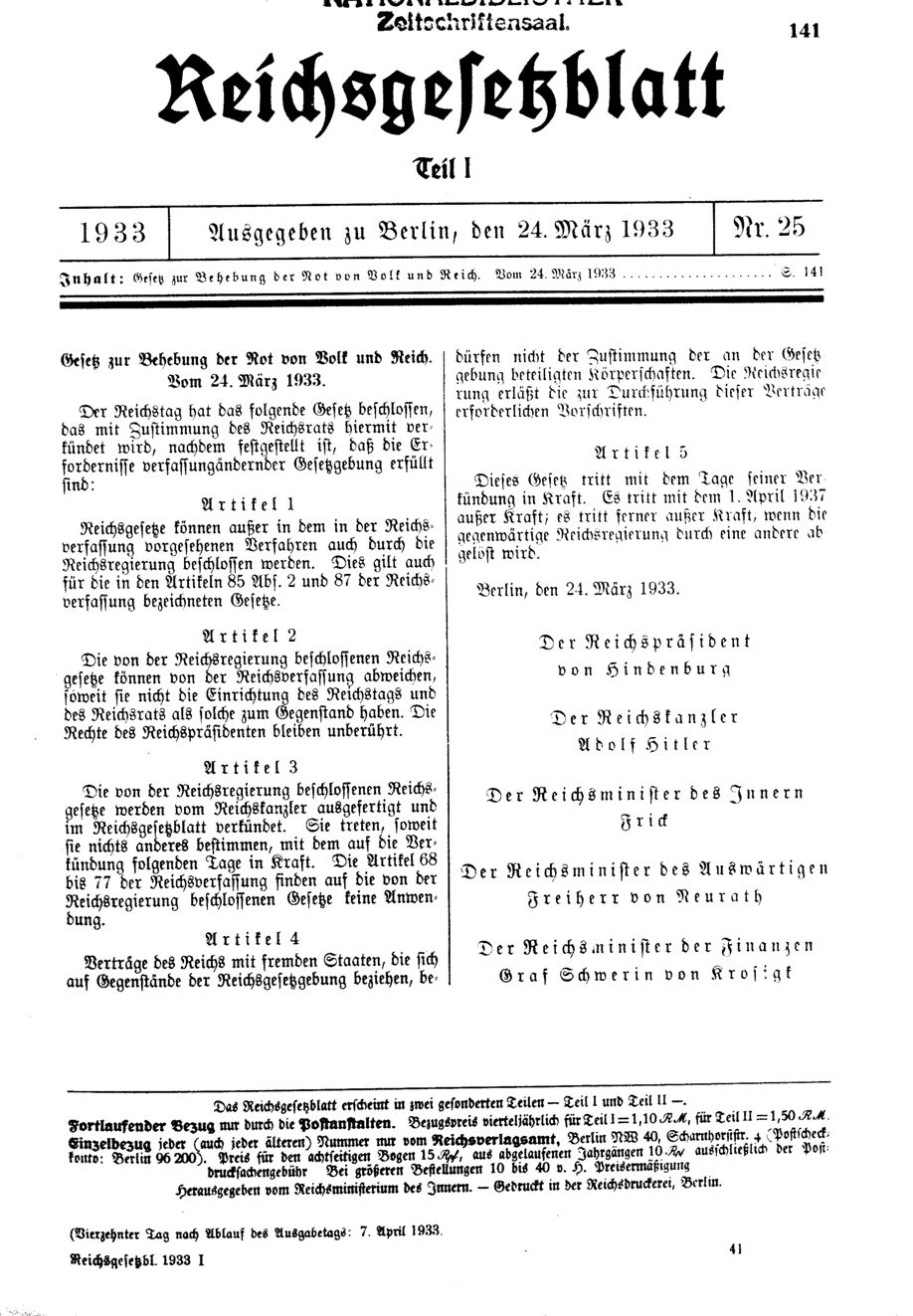
Enabling act of 1933 printed in the Reich Law Gazette

As with most of the laws passed in the process of Gleichschaltung, the Enabling Act is quite short, especially considering its implications. The full text, in German and English, follows:

Gesetz zur Behebung der Not von Volk und Reich

Der Reichstag hat das folgende Gesetz beschlossen, das mit Zustimmung des Reichsrats hiermit verkündet wird, nachdem festgestellt ist, daß die Erfordernisse verfassungsändernder Gesetzgebung erfüllt sind:

Artikel 1

Reichsgesetze können außer in dem in der Reichsverfassung vorgesehenen Verfahren auch durch die Reichsregierung beschlossen werden. Dies gilt auch für die in den Artikeln 85 Abs. 2 und 87 der Reichsverfassung bezeichneten Gesetze.

Artikel 2

Die von der Reichsregierung beschlossenen Reichsgesetze können von der Reichsverfassung abweichen, soweit sie nicht die Einrichtung des Reichstags und des Reichsrats als solche zum Gegenstand haben. Die Rechte des Reichspräsidenten bleiben unberührt.

Artikel 3

Die von der Reichsregierung beschlossenen Reichsgesetze werden vom Reichskanzler ausgefertigt und im Reichsgesetzblatt verkündet. Sie treten, soweit sie nichts anderes bestimmen, mit dem auf die Verkündung folgenden Tage in Kraft. Die Artikel 68 bis 77 der Reichsverfassung finden auf die von der Reichsregierung beschlossenen Gesetze keine Anwendung.

Artikel 4

Verträge des Reiches mit fremden Staaten, die sich auf Gegenstände der Reichsgesetzgebung beziehen, bedürfen für die Dauer der Geltung dieser Gesetze nicht der Zustimmung der an der Gesetzgebung beteiligten Körperschaften. Die Reichsregierung erläßt die zur Durchführung dieser Verträge erforderlichen Vorschriften.

Artikel 5

Dieses Gesetz tritt mit dem Tage seiner Verkündung in Kraft. Es tritt mit dem 1. April 1937 außer Kraft; es tritt ferner außer Kraft, wenn die gegenwärtige Reichsregierung durch eine andere abgelöst wird.

Translation:
Law to Remedy the Distress of the People and the Reich

The Reichstag has enacted the following law, which is hereby proclaimed with the assent of the Reichsrat, it having been established that the requirements for a constitutional amendment have been fulfilled:

Article 1

In addition to the procedure prescribed by the constitution, laws of the Reich may also be enacted by the government of the Reich. This includes the laws referred to by Articles 85 Paragraph 2 and Article 87 of the constitution.

Article 2

Laws enacted by the government of the Reich may deviate from the constitution as long as they do not affect the institutions of the Reichstag and the Reichsrat. The rights of the President remain unaffected.

Article 3

Laws enacted by the Reich government shall be issued by the Chancellor and announced in the Reich Law Gazette. They shall take effect on the day following the announcement, unless they prescribe a different date. Articles 68 to 77 of the Constitution do not apply to laws enacted by the Reich government.

Article 4

Treaties of the Reich with foreign states, which relate to matters of Reich legislation, shall for the duration of the validity of these laws not require the consent of the legislative authorities. The Reich government shall enact the legislation necessary to implement these agreements.

Article 5

This law enters into force on the day of its proclamation. It expires on 1 April 1937; it expires furthermore if the present Reich government is replaced by another.

Articles 1 and 4 gave the government the right to draw up the budget, approve treaties, and enact almost any law without input from the Reichstag. By the rules of pre-1933 German legal interpretation, and post-1945 if such a law were not now unconstitutional, this would mean that such laws would henceforth be decided by a majority vote in the Cabinet. This was not followed.

In the years immediately preceding, the government had relied on Article 48 emergency decrees. These had to be made by the President, alongside ordinary laws which he simply enacted. In the passing of Enabling-Act-based laws, the President had no role to play at all. Until Hitler effectively assumed the President's role in 1934, laws were passed without any contribution by the head of state. This was a situation unique in German history.

== Signatories ==
The signatories of the Enabling Act were:

- Reich President Paul von Hindenburg
- Reich Chancellor Adolf Hitler
- Reich Minister of the Interior Frick
- Reich Minister for Foreign Affairs Baron von Neurath
- Reich Minister of Finances Count Schwerin von Krosigk

== Passage ==
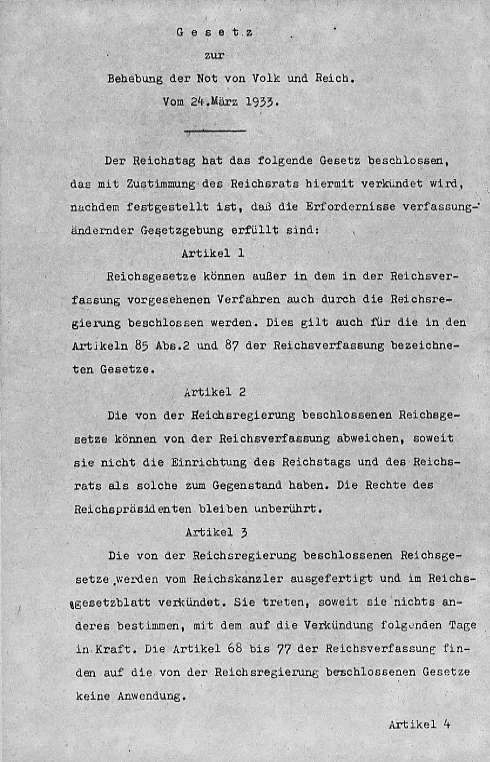
Page 1 of the Enabling Act

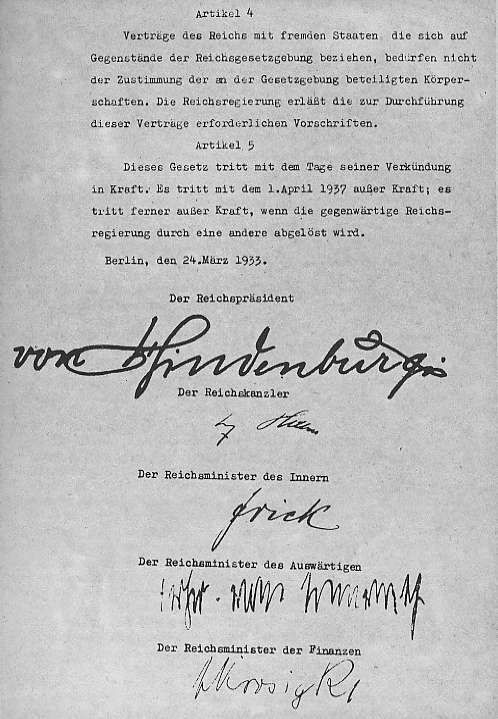
Page 2, with signatures

Late on 23 March, the Reichstag assembled at the Kroll Opera House, its temporary home since the Reichstag fire. SA men were positioned inside and outside the chamber.

=== Party positions ===
The KPD had not been formally banned despite the Nazis' virulent anti-Communist rhetoric. A violent uprising was still feared, and it was hoped that the KPD's presence on the ballot would siphon off votes from the SPD. However, even before the election of 5 March, the party was subject to intense police repression on the grounds of its purported involvement in the Reichstag fire and it was widely understood that the KPD deputies would not be allowed to take their seats in parliament.

The SPD's expected opposition was partly neutralized by the Reichstag Fire Decree, which had been used to detain a number of SPD deputies. Other SPD parliamentarians had fled into exile.

Debate within the Centre Party had continued until the day of the vote. Ludwig Kaas advocated voting in favour of the act, touting promised written guarantees from Hitler. Former Chancellor Heinrich Brüning wanted the bill to be rejected. The majority sided with Kaas, and Brüning agreed to maintain party cohesion by voting for the law.

=== Manoeuvring ===
The Reichstag, led by its president, Hermann Göring, changed its rules of procedure to make it easier to pass the bill. Under the Weimar Constitution, a quorum of two-thirds of the entire Reichstag membership was required to be present in order to call up a law amending the constitution—in this case, 432 of the Reichstag's 647 deputies. To sidestep this potential obstruction, Göring reduced this figure to 378 by not counting the 81 KPD deputies who were absent.

=== Speeches ===
Hitler spoke in favour of the proposed law. The speech recapitulated the supposed historical responsibility of the Weimar Republic in Germany's crisis, and then listed grievances that would be addressed by the Enabling Act. In a pitch to the Centre Party, Hitler emphasised the importance of Christianity in German culture and incorporated Ludwig Kaas's requested guarantees almost verbatim. His speech concluded with reassurances about the continuity of Weimar institutions, but an appeal to the inadequacy of parliamentary government:

"Some of the [government's] planned measures require the approval of the majority necessary for constitutional amendments. The performance of these tasks and their completion is necessary. It would be inconsistent with the aim of the national uprising and it would fail to suffice for the intended goal were the Government to negotiate with and request the approval of the Reichstag for its measures in each given case."

The Centre's Ludwig Kaas spoke to voice his party's support for the bill amid "concerns put aside". He had still not received the written guarantee he had negotiated but had been assured it was being "typed up". It was never received. Heinrich Brüning remained silent.

Wels–Hitler debate
Otto Wels's speech against the Enabling Act, followed by Hitler's response

Only SPD leader Otto Wels spoke against the Enabling Act. He defended the Social Democrats' record in rebuilding Germany following the First World War, and dismissed the Nazis' claimed need for special powers. Defying direct intimidation, Otto Wels declared his party's continued allegiance to Germany's institutions:

"The Weimar Constitution is not a socialist constitution. But we stand by the principles enshrined in, the principles of a state based on the rule of law, of equal rights, of social justice. In this historic hour, we German Social Democrats solemnly pledge ourselves to the principles of humanity and justice, of freedom and socialism. No Enabling Act gives you the power to destroy ideas that are eternal and indestructible."

Reinhold Maier (an MP of the German State Party) gave his own statement during the Reichstag session:

On March 5th, the German people elected an absolute majority of right wingers to the Reichstag, thereby expressing their will to entrust the leadership of their state to the current government. We hope and wish that, under the current leadership, the German people may successfully bring to a close their struggle for freedom and the resurgence of the nation, a struggle waged with great effort and sacrifice for the past fourteen years. We feel entirely aligned with the great national goals as presented today by the Reich Chancellor. […] If, however, we feel obliged in this most urgent hour to express our concerns, we assume that the current government will also welcome objective and loyal criticism of its measures. We find the current draft law lacking in explicit safeguards against infringements on fundamental constitutional rights and the foundations of the civil legal order. […] In the interest of the people and the fatherland, and in anticipation of a peaceful development, we today set aside our serious reservations and approve the law.

Initially the representatives of the German State Party had been divided, with some suggesting that they should vote against the Enabling Act or abstain, but the other members overruled them.

=== Voting ===
As voting proceeded, SPD deputies were actively intimidated by the Nazi SA men, who were present throughout the proceedings.

=== Results ===
All parties except the SPD voted in favour of the Enabling Act. With the KPD banned and 26 SPD deputies arrested or in hiding, the final tally was 444 in favour of the Enabling Act against 94 opposed (all Social Democrats). The Reichstag adopted the bill with the support of 83% of the deputies present. Even if all SPD deputies had been present, it would have passed with 78.7% support.

Voting on the Enabling Act
Party	Deputies	For	Against	Absent
Nazi Party	288	288	—N/a	—N/a
Social Democratic Party	120	—N/a	94	26
Communist Party	81	—N/a	—N/a	81
Centre	73	72	—N/a	1
National People's Party	52	52	—N/a	—N/a
Bavarian People's Party	19	19	—N/a	—N/a
State Party	5	5	—N/a	—N/a
Christian Social People's Service	4	4	—N/a	—N/a
People's Party	2	1	—N/a	1
Farmers' Party	2	2	—N/a	—N/a
Landbund	1	1	—N/a	—N/a
Total	647	444 (68.62%)	94 (14.53%)	109 (16.85%)

In the evening of the same day, the Reichsrat gave its assent, unanimously and without prior debate, and the Enabling Act was signed into law by President Paul von Hindenburg. (Note: see the following:) Unless extended by the Reichstag, the act would expire after four years.

== Consequences ==
The Enabling Act completed the effect of the Reichstag Fire Decree. It transformed Hitler's government into a legal dictatorship and laid the groundwork for his totalitarian regime. Thus empowered, Hitler could begin German rearmament and achieve his aggressive foreign policy aims, which ultimately resulted in World War II and the death of one-tenth of Germany's own population.

The Reichstag effectively became the rubber stamp parliament that Hitler sought. The German conservative elite, including the vice-chancellor Franz von Papen, having underestimated the determination of the Nazis to monopolize state power, were soon marginalized by the Nazi regime. By mid-March 1933, the government began sending communists, trade union leaders, and other political dissidents to Dachau, the first Nazi concentration camp.

On 14 July 1933, the Law Against the Formation of Parties made the Nazi Party the only legally permitted party in Germany. With that, Hitler fulfilled what he had promised in earlier campaign speeches: "I set for myself one aim ... to sweep these thirty parties out of Germany!"

== Legal fate ==
The Weimar Constitution of 1919, as amended by the Enabling Act, remained technically in effect. No new constitution was ever introduced and the Weimar constitution was never formally repealed or invalidated by the Nazi regime.

=== Consultation and deliberation ===
During the negotiations between the government and the political parties, it had been agreed that the government should inform the Reichstag parties of laws passed under the Enabling Act. For that purpose, a working committee was set up, co-chaired by Hitler and Centre Party chairman Kaas. However, the committee met only three times, without any major impact, and had become a dead letter even before all other parties were banned.

Although the Act had formally given legislative powers to the government as a whole, those powers were, for all intents and purposes, exercised by Hitler himself. After the passage of the Act, there were no longer serious deliberations in Cabinet meetings. After 1934, its meetings became more and more infrequent, and it did not meet in full after 1938.

=== Possible violations ===
The "Law on the Reconstruction of the Reich" (30 January 1934), passed by the Reichstag, dissolved the state parliaments and subordinated the state governments to the Reich government, turning Germany into a highly centralized state. This effectively rendered the Reichsrat impotent, since that chamber represented the states. Two weeks later (14 February) the Reichsrat itself was abolished by the Cabinet. Both laws appeared to contradict Article 2 of the Enabling Act, which explicitly protected the existence of the Reichsrat and stipulated laws passed under the Enabling Act "must not affect the institutions" of that chamber. Moreover, Article 63 of the Weimar Constitution requires that "the states shall be represented in the Reichsrat by members of their ministries". However, the Law on the Reconstruction of the Reich was passed by the Reichstag as a constitutional amendment (and was therefore not subject to the Enabling Act's restrictions in the first place), and its Article 4 reads: "The Reich Government may issue new constitutional laws." (See Law on the Abolition of the Reichsrat § Constitutional legitimacy.)

In August 1934, President Hindenburg died, and Hitler seized the president's powers for himself in accordance with the Law Concerning the Head of State of the German Reich, passed the previous day. The move was confirmed by a referendum later that month. However, Article 2 of the Enabling Act stated that the president's powers were to remain "undisturbed" (or "unaffected", depending on the translation), which has long been interpreted as barring Hitler from tampering with the presidency. Furthermore, a 1932 amendment to the constitution had made the president of the High Court of Justice, not the chancellor, first in the line of succession to the presidency—and even then on an interim basis pending new elections. This ostensible violation of Article 2 was never challenged in court; either way, it appeared that this law was not in violation of Article 4 of the Law of the Reconstruction of the Reich.

=== Renewals ===
The Enabling Act was renewed twice, the first coming in 1937 and the second in 1939. Its renewal was practically assured because all other parties were banned. Voters were presented with a single list of Nazis and Nazi-approved candidates under far-from-secret conditions. On 25 January 1943, Hitler extended the term of the Reichstag members until 30 January 1947 by enacting the Law on the Extension of the Electoral Term of the Greater German Reichstag, effectively extending its provisions for the duration of the war.

=== In the Federal Republic of Germany ===
The Enabling Act was formally declared to be repealed by the Allied Control Council in Control Council Law No. 1, following the surrender of Germany at the end of World War II.

Germany's Basic Law (constitution) of 1949 stipulates that only bodies that are constitutionally endowed with legislative power can enact laws. This theoretically precludes legislation such as the 1933 Enabling Act.

Article 9 of the 1949 constitution allows for social groups to be labeled verfassungsfeindlich ("hostile to the constitution") and to be proscribed by the federal government. Political parties can be labeled enemies to the constitution only by the Bundesverfassungsgericht (Federal Constitutional Court) according to Art. 21 II. This clause makes clear that even a popular majority cannot be allowed to install a totalitarian or autocratic regime such as with the Enabling Act of 1933, which would violate the principles of the German constitution.

== Validity ==
In his 2003 book, The Coming of the Third Reich, British historian Richard J. Evans argued that the Enabling Act was legally invalid. He contended that Göring had no right to arbitrarily reduce the quorum required to bring the bill up for a vote. While the Enabling Act only required the support of two-thirds of those present and voting, two-thirds of the entire Reichstag's membership had to be present in order for the legislature to consider a constitutional amendment.

According to Evans, while Göring was not required to count the KPD deputies in order to get the Enabling Act passed, he was required to "recognize their existence" by counting them for purposes of the quorum needed to call it up, making his refusal to do so "an illegal act". Even if the Communists had been present and voting, the intimidating atmosphere of the session was such that the Act would have still passed with at least 68.7% support.

Evans also argued that the act's passage in the Reichsrat was tainted by the overthrow of the state governments under the Reichstag Fire Decree; as Evans put it, the states were no longer "properly constituted or represented", making the Enabling Act's passage in the Reichsrat "irregular".

== In popular culture ==
The 2003 film Hitler: The Rise of Evil contains a scene portraying the passage of the Enabling Act.

== See also ==
- Streitbare Demokratie
- French Constitutional Law of 1940 (a similar law which amended the constitution to grant absolute authority to the government, whose passing heralded the end of the French Third Republic)
