= Reichsgesetzblatt =

Government gazette of the German Empire (1871–1945)

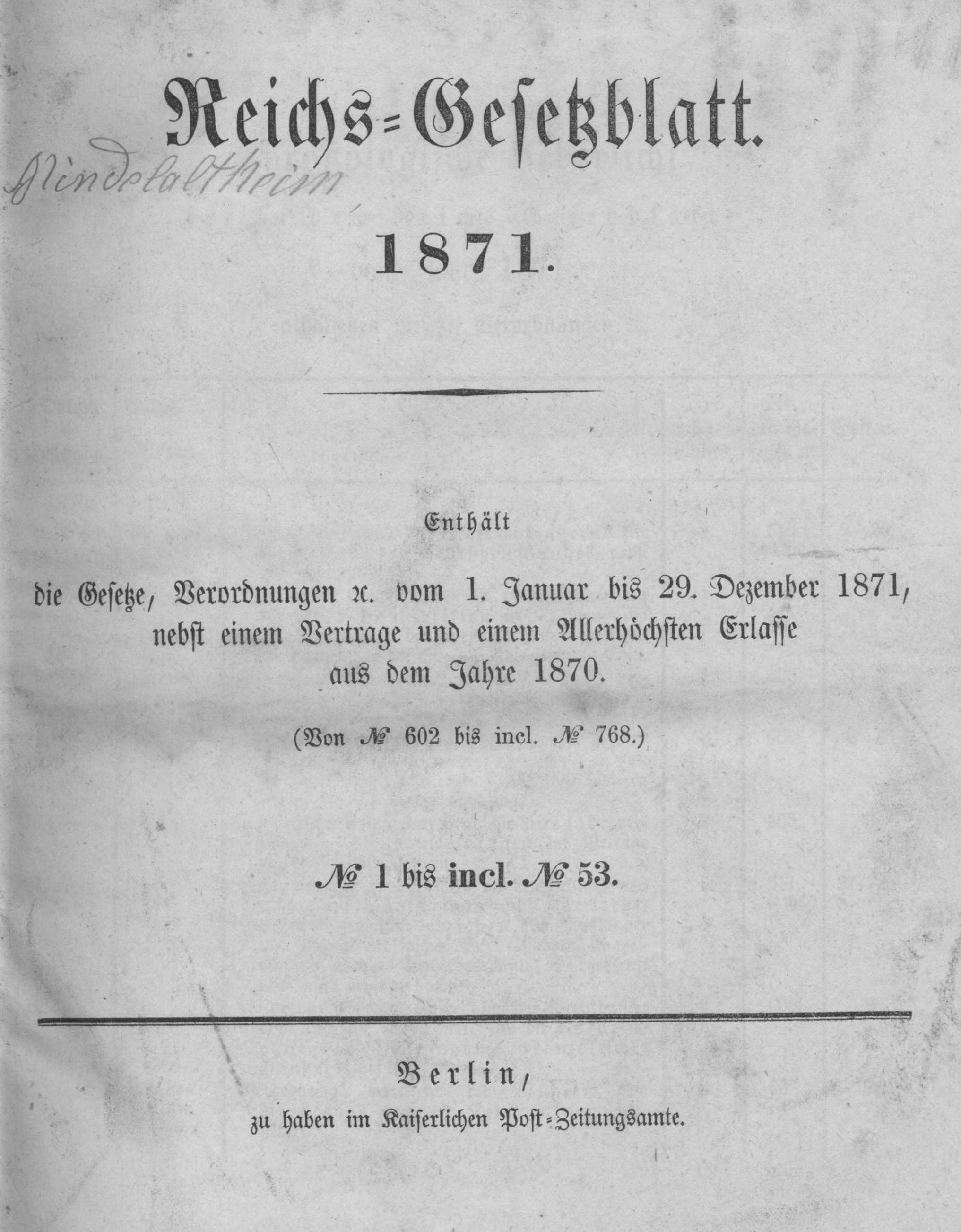
- Cover of the first volume of the Reichsgesetzblatt
- Type: Official journal
- Publisher: Office of the Reichskanzler (1871–1880); Reichsamt des Innern (1880–1918); Reich Ministry of the Interior (1918–1945)
- Founded: 8 May 1871 (under the name Reichsgesetzblatt)
- Language: German
- Ceased publication: 11 April 1945 (Part I)
- OCLC number: 224485947
- Free online archives: German Wikisource; alex.onb.ac.at/tab_dra.htm

The Reichsgesetzblatt (lit. 'Reich Law Gazette' or 'Imperial Law Gazette'; abbreviated RGBl.), was the government gazette of the German Reich from 1871 to 1945, thus covering the German Empire, the Weimar Republic, and Nazi Germany.

All laws of the German Reich in a formal sense (i.e., all laws that have been passed through the prescribed legislative process) had to be promulgated in it to become legally existent.

== Legal function ==
At least since the formation of the German Empire in 1871, the promulgation (Verkündung) of a law was the last step in the German legislative process. The legal existence of a law depended on its formal (and complete) promulgation – this promulgation had to happen in the Reichsgesetzblatt. The respective mechanism was laid down in the empire's constitution: Article 2 Sentence 2 of the 1871 Constitution prescribed that laws had to be promulgated in the Reichsgesetzblatt. If no special provision was made, they entered into force 14 days after their publication. The gazette thus had a significant role in the formation of the laws of the empire.

This role continued during the Weimar Republic era (1919–1933): Article 70 of the 1919 Weimar Constitution commanded that laws had to be published within a month of their adoption in the Reichsgesetzblatt and Article 71 again established that – in the absence of a special provision – they entered into force 14 days after their publication.

During Nazi Germany (1933–1945), Article 70 of 1919 Weimar Constitution formally remained in force, but the rule that laws entered into force 14 days after publication was only used once (for the Reichsbürgergesetz), because all other laws had their own special provision for their entry into force.

== History ==
=== Predecessors and first issues ===
The predecessors of the Reichsgesetzblatt were the Bundes-Gesetzblatt für den Norddeutschen Bund (Federal Law Gazette for the North German Confederation), the official journal of the North German Confederation, which was established on 26 July 1867, and the older Gesetzessammlung of the Kingdom of Prussia.

The Reichsgesetzblatt was first issued – as No. 19 – under this name on 8 May 1871. The issues No. 1 to 3 of the 1871 volume of the Reichsgesetzblatt were still published under the title Bundesgesetzblatt für den Norddeutschen Bund (Federal Law Gazette for the North German Confederation), while the issues No. 4 to 18 (27 January 1871 – 2 May 1871) of said volume were titled Bundesgesetzblatt für den Deutschen Bund (Federal Law Gazette for the German Confederation).

The Reichsgesetzblatt was originally published by the office of the German Reich Chancellor, while the Prussian Gesetzsammlungsamt (Law Collection Office) was in charge of the technical aspects of publishing the paper. Later the Reichsamt des Innern (1880–1918) and afterwards the Reich Ministry of the Interior (1918–1945) were responsible for its publication. The laws published in each volume of the Reichsgesetzblatt – always covering one year – were numbered chronologically.

=== Splitting of the Reichsgesetzblatt ===
The Reichsgesetzblatt was split into two parts on 1 April 1922; a proclamation of 6 March 1922 explained the splitting: Part II of the gazette would henceforth print those "publications that experience has shown to take up a lot of space and that many customers can do without", while laws and publications on all others topics would be published in part I. A list of topics was established that clarified which publications would be printed in part II. These were:

I. International treaties and the like, as well as agreements between the Reich and the Länder, also insofar as they are promulgated as law.

II. Publications concerning:

1. Reichshaushaltsgesetze and Ortsklassenverzeichnisse,
2. Industrial property rights and copyright,
3. Internal affairs of the Wehrmacht,
4. Railway traffic, shipping traffic and the administration of the Reich waterways,
5. Affairs of the coal or potash industry from the business area of the Reich Ministry of Economics,
6. Internal affairs of the Reichstag
7. Affairs of the Reichsbank and the private banks.

— Announcement on the Reich Law Gazette of 6 March 1922 (Bekanntmachung über das Reichsgesetzblatt vom 6. März 1922), RGBl. 1922 S. 232 (RGBl. 1922 p. 232) (Note: Original German text: I. Internationale Uebereinkommen und dergleichen, sowie vertragliche Abkommen zwischen Reich und Ländern, auch soweit sie als Gesetz verkündet sind. II. Veröffentlichungen, die betreffen: 1. Reichshaushaltsgesetze und Ortsklassenverzeichnisse, 2. den gewerblichen Rechtsschutz und das Urheberrecht, 3. innere Angelegenheiten der Wehrmacht, 4. den Eisenbahnverkehr, den Schiffahrtverkehr und die Verwaltung der Reichswasserstraßen, 5. Angelegenheiten der Kohlen- oder Kaliwirtschaft stellen aus dem Geschäftsbereiche des Reichswirtschaftsministeriums, 6. innere Angelegenheiten des Reichstags; 7. Angelegenheiten der Reichsbank und der Privatnotenbanken.)

In 1924, publications concerning the "Administration of the Reichsbahn Company" (Verwaltung der Reichsbahn-Gesellschaft) and "Matters of Industrial Burden" (Angelegenheiten der Industriebelastung) were added as topics for part II of the gazette by a proclamation dated 30 August 1924.

=== Publication of ordinances ===
In October 1923, a law was passed on the publication of ordinances of the country (Rechtsverordnungen des Reichs). It was decided that such ordinances should generally be published in the Reichsgesetzblatt, but they could also be published in the Reichs-Ministerialblatt (Reich Ministerial Gazette) or the Deutscher Reichsanzeiger (German Reich Gazette). In 1924, the legal scholar J. Jastrow considered this to be the most important change in the history of the Reichsgesetzblatt because since then it was no longer the only government gazette in which all laws (in a material sense) had to be published. He wrote:

Mit dem Gesetz vom 13. Oktober 1923 hat das RGBl. aufgehört, 'die' Gesetzsammlung des Deutschen Reiches (in vollendetem Sinne) zu sein. Eine Musterleistung staatsrechtlicher Abrundung ist geopfert. Der heutige Zustand ist ein Rückfall in eine Zeit, die das Deutsche Reich bei seinem Entstehen hinter sich gewiesen hat. With the law of 13 October 1923, the RGBl. ceased to be 'the' collection of laws of the German Reich (in the full sense). A model achievement of constitutional law has been sacrificed. Today's state of affairs is a relapse into an era that the German Reich left behind when it came into being.

— J. Jastrow, Das Reichsgesetzblatt (The Reich Law Gazette)

=== Nazi Germany, extension to Austria and successor gazettes ===
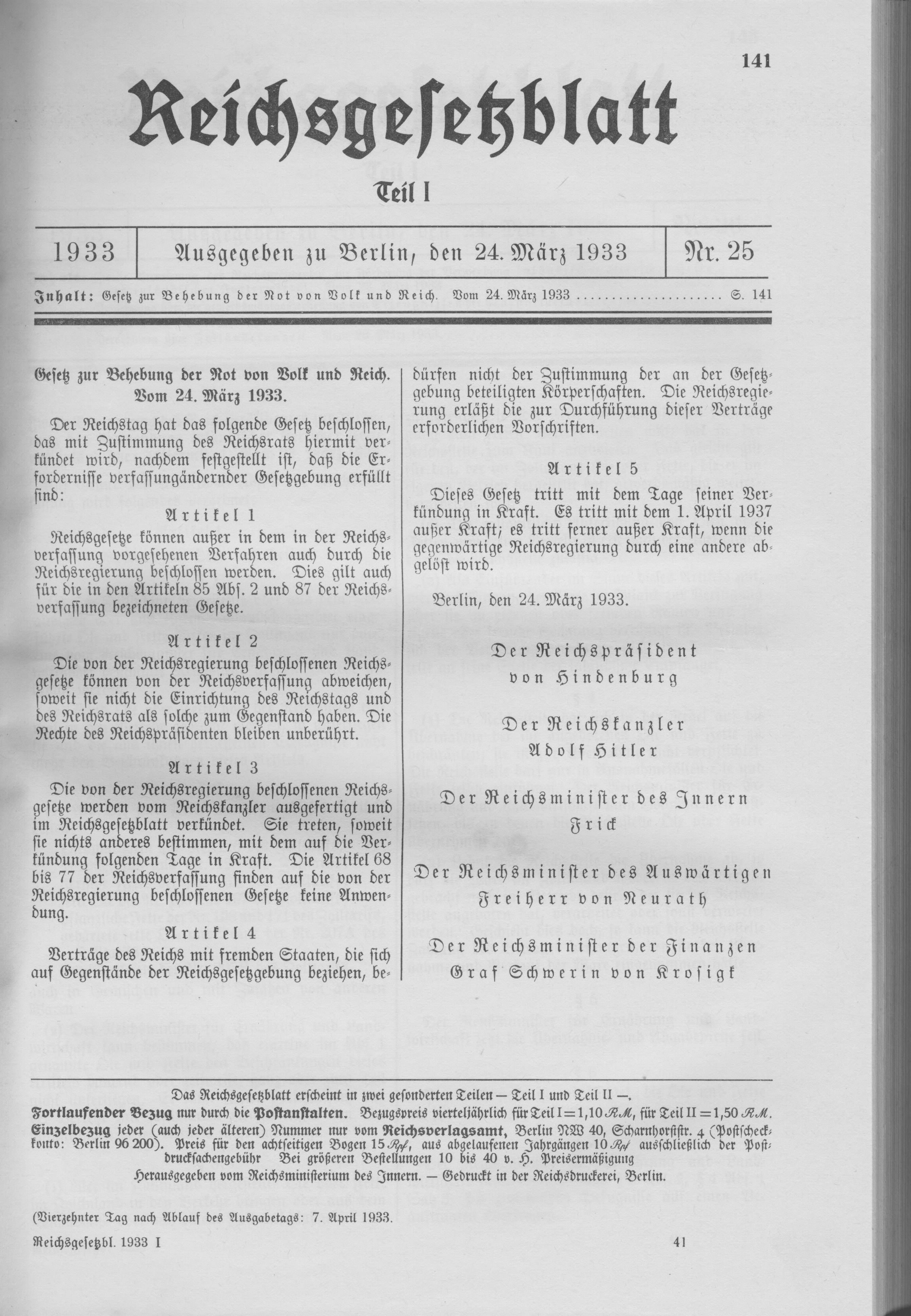
The Enabling Act of 1933 published as RGBl. 1933 I p. 141

The Reichsgesetzblatt continued to be used in Nazi Germany (1933–1945). The Enabling Act of 1933, for example, provided in its Article 3 that all laws enacted by the government – and not only those passed by the legislature (the Reichstag) – were to be published in the Reichsgesetzblatt. The ordinances of the Reich (Rechtsverordnungen des Reichs) were at first still published in the three publications named in the 1923 law, but soon other government gazettes were formed and prescribed as suitable for publication of such ordinances.

The publication requirement for laws was, however, no longer generally observed; the legal scholar Bernd Mertens notes that not all binding law was published by the Nazi authorities in their government gazettes. Furthermore, the Reichsgesetzblatt was no longer a government gazette for laws only, but also a paper for certain propaganda appeals by the Reich government without any legal value (for example, the Proklamation der Reichsregierung an das deutsche Volk [Proclamation of the Reich Government to the German People] concerning the re-introduction of compulsory military service in 1935). He comments:

Das Reichsgesetzblatt bot also nicht allein keine Gewähr mehr für Vollständigkeit, sondern verlor gleichzeitig auch seine exklusive Ausrichtung als Verkündungsorgan von Rechtsnormen. The Reichsgesetzblatt thus not only no longer offered a guarantee of completeness, but at the same time also lost its exclusive orientation as a promulgating organ of legal norms.

— Bernd Mertens, Rechtsetzung im Nationalsozialismus (Law-making under National Socialism)

After the Anschluss, the scope of application of the Reichsgesetzblatt was extended to Austria on 15 March 1938. Laws especially pertaining to Austria were printed in the Reichsgesetzblatt and the Gesetzblatt für das Land Österreich (Law Gazette for the Land of Austria): the latter was, however, discontinued in March 1940, and only the Reichsgesetzblatt was used thereafter.

In the wake of the Antiqua–Fraktur dispute, the Reichsgesetzblatt stopped using the typeface class Fraktur and began using Antiqua beginning with its first issue of 1942.

The last issue (No. 10) of the Reichsgesetzblatt was published in its part I on 11 April 1945, five days before the Battle of Berlin began. Its successors are the Bundesgesetzblatt (Federal Law Gazette) for Germany (1949–) and the Gesetzblatt der Deutschen Demokratischen Republik (Law Gazette of the German Democratic Republic) for East Germany, which was published from 1949 to 1990.

== Citing the Reichsgesetzblatt ==
The Reichsgesetzblatt is commonly cited in two ways, depending on the year: If a publication in the gazette up to (and including) year 1921 is cited, then, its abbreviation RGBl., the respective year (volume) and the page number is given. If a publication in the gazette after (and including 1922) is cited, the respective part of the RGBl. – Part I or Part II – is also provided by adding "I" or "II" after the year. If a specific law is cited and its year is given and it is the same as the volume of the Reichsgesetzblatt, the year is usually omitted in the citation.

For example, "RGBl. 1896 S. 195" (or RGBl. 1896 p. 195) gives the citation for the original version of the Bürgerliches Gesetzbuch (German civil code) on page 195 of the 1896 volume of the Reichsgesetzblatt, while "RGBl. 1933 I S. 141" or (RGBl. 1933 I p. 141) provides the citation for the Enabling Act of 1933 on page 141 of part I of the 1933 volume of the Reichsgesetzblatt.
