= History of Hesse =

This article is about the history of Hesse. Hesse is a state in Germany.

== Prehistoric ==
In the Paleolithic Era, the Central Hessian region around Wetzlar was settled. Extensive excavations along the Lahn in Wetzlar-Dalheim recently uncovered a 7000-year-old settlement from the Linear Pottery culture. Bell Beaker shards found in Rüsselsheim, Offenbach, Griesheim and Wiesbaden suggest settlement in southern Hesse 4,500 years ago.

== Early Middle Ages ==
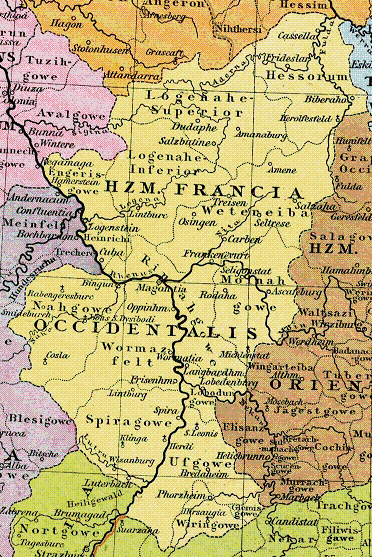
Western Franconia c. 1000 CE

During the early Holy Roman Empire, what is now Hesse broadly corresponded with Western or Rhenish Franconia, the western half of the stem duchy of Franconia. Hessengau or Pagus Hassorum was a Gau – a subdivision similar to a shire – in the far-north of Franconia. The name probably derives from the Chatti, a Germanic people who inhabited the area in Roman times.

== Landgraviate ==
The Landgraviate of Hesse (German: Landgrafschaft Hessen), a German principality of the Holy Roman Empire, was established in 1264 as a partition of the Landgraviate of Thuringia following the War of the Thuringian Succession.

The landgraviate gained the County of Katzenelnbogen in 1479. In 1500 a dispute over Katzenelnbogen with Nassau led to the lengthy War of the Katzenelnbogen Succession.

In 1568 with the death of Landgrave Philip I, the Landgraviate of Hesse was divided among his sons, establishing the lines of Hesse-Kassel (then spelled Cassel), Hesse-Marburg, Hesse-Rheinfels and Hesse-Darmstadt. Both Philip II of Hesse-Rheinfels and Louis IV of Hesse-Marburg died childless (in 1583 and 1604); their lands passed to Hesse-Kassel.

== 17th and 18th centuries ==
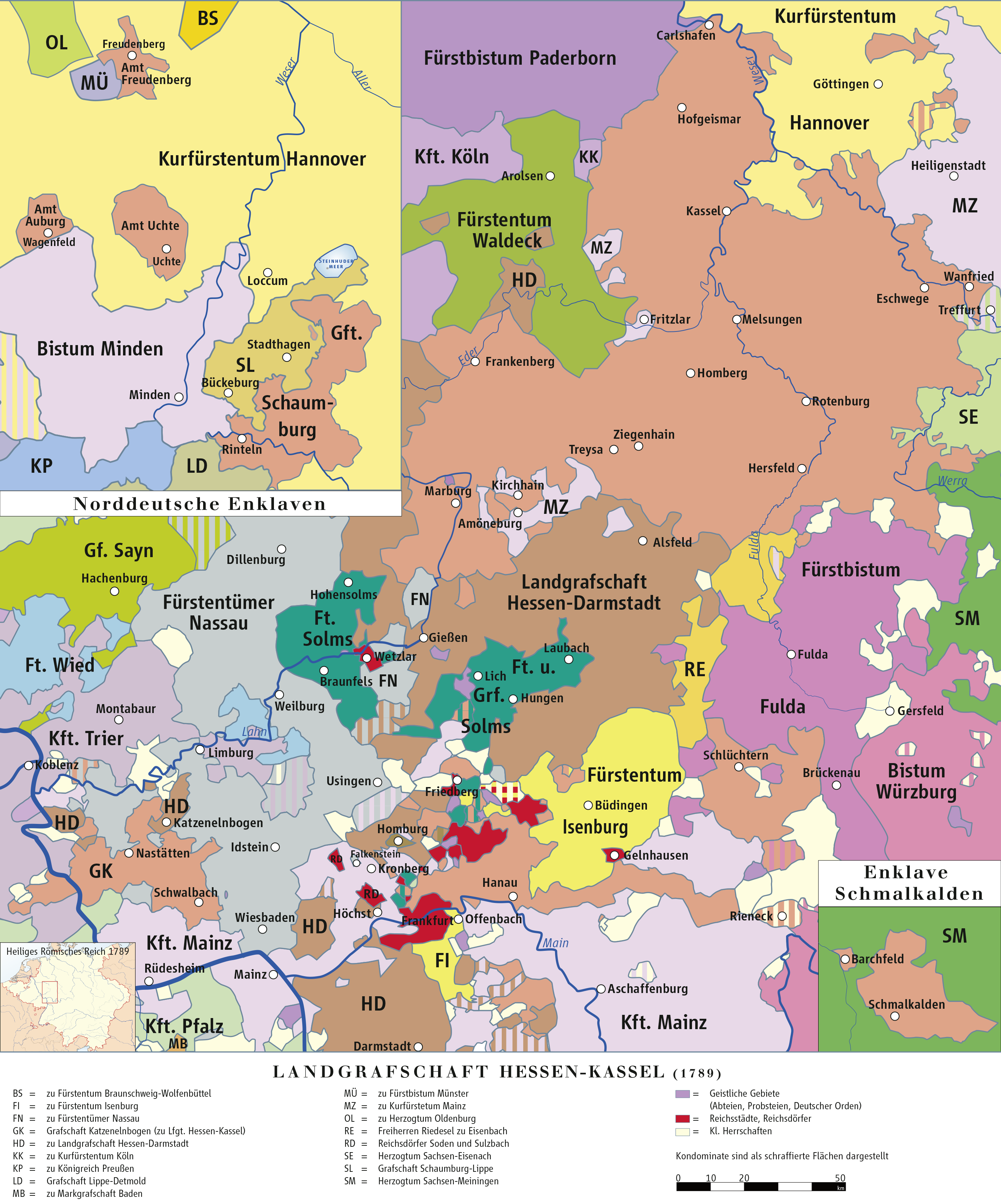
Hesse-Kassel c. 1789

While Hesse-Kassel converted to Calvinism and became one of the most zealous exponents of the Protestant cause in the Thirty Years' War, Landgrave George II remained a strict Lutheran and maintained a close alliance with Saxony, which led to a pro-Habsburg policy after 1642.

From the early years of the Reformation, the House of Hesse was predominately Protestant. Landgraves Philip I, William V, and Maurice married descendants of King George of Bohemia; from William VI onwards, mothers of the heads of Hesse-Kassel were always descended from William the Silent, the leader of the Dutch to independence on the basis of Calvinism.

During the Thirty Years' War, Calvinist Hesse-Kassel proved to be Sweden's most loyal German ally. Landgrave William V and, after his death in 1637, his widow Amelia of Hanau, a granddaughter of William the Silent, as regent supported the Protestant cause and the French and Swedes throughout the war and maintained an army, garrisoning many strongholds, while Hesse-Kassel itself was occupied by Imperial troops.

William V was succeeded by Landgraves William VI and William VII. Under King Frederick I of Sweden, Hesse-Kassel was in personal union with Sweden from 1730–51. But in fact the King's younger brother, Prince William, ruled in Kassel as Regent until he succeeded his brother, reigning as William VIII until 1760.

Although it was a fairly widespread practice at the time to rent out troops to other princes, it was the Landgraves of Hesse-Kassel who became infamous for hiring out contingents of their army as mercenaries during the 17th and 18th centuries. Hesse-Kassel maintained 7% of its entire population under arms throughout the eighteenth century. This force served as a source of mercenaries for other European states. Frederick II, notably, hired out so many troops to his nephew King George III of Great Britain for use in the American War of Independence, that "Hessian" has become a common term among Americans and historians for all German soldiers deployed by the British in the War. One of these regiments that saw service in America was the Musketeer Regiment Prinz Carl.

In 1640 Hesse-Kassel gained half of the County of Schaumburg (today in Lower Saxony), which remained an exclave of Hesse-Kassel (later Hesse-Nassau) until 1932.

In 1622 the small Hesse-Homburg was established from a cadet line of Hesse-Darmstadt.

During the 17th century, Hesse-Kassel was internally divided for dynastic purposes, without allodial rights, into:

- the Landgraviate of Hesse-Rotenburg (1627–1834)
- the Landgraviate of Hesse-Wanfried-(Rheinfels) (1649–1755)
- the Landgraviate of Hesse-Philippsthal
- the Landgraviate of Hesse-Philippsthal-Barchfeld

These were reunited with the Landgraviate of Hesse-Kassel when each particular branch died out without issue.

In 1736 the last Count of Hanau died; a 1643 a succession treaty led to Hanau-Münzenberg passing to Hesse-Kassel and Hanau-Lichtenberg (much of which lay in Alsace and so was subject to the Kingdom of France) to Hesse-Darmstadt. In 1760 the Hanau-Münzenberg territory became the Hesse-Kassel secundogeniture Hesse-Hanau, which persisted until 1821.

== 1789–1815 ==
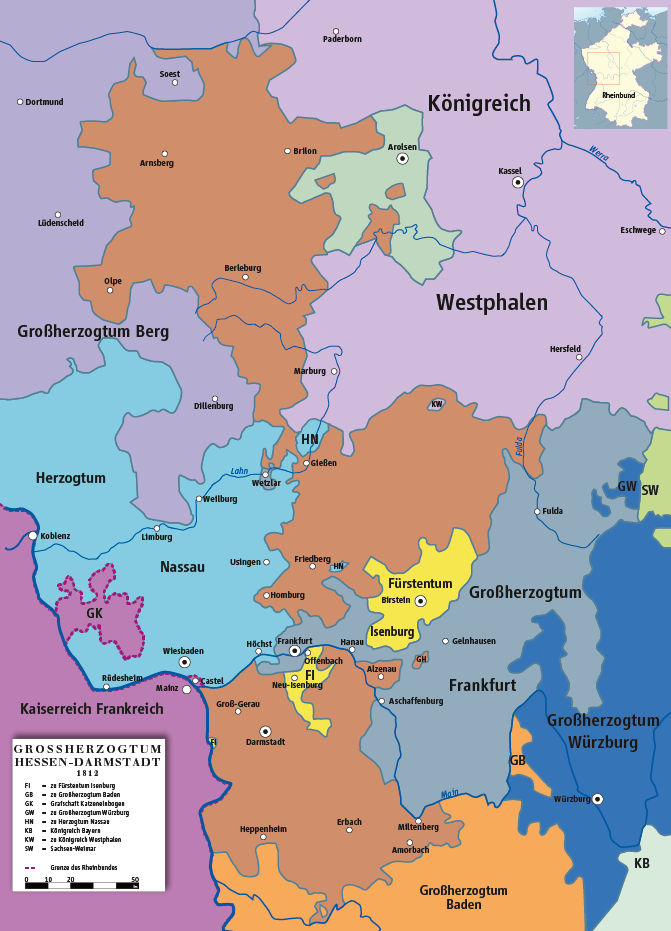
The Grand Duchy of Hesse and surrounding states c. 1812

During the French Revolutionary Wars the French Republic annexed the left bank of the Rhine, including most of Hanau-Lichtenberg.

Following the reorganization of the German states of 1803 – the Reichsdeputationshauptschluss – Landgrave William IX of Hesse-Kassel was elevated to prince-elector, taking the title William I, Elector of Hesse. His state thus became the Electorate of Hesse (German: Kurfürstentum Hessen, commonly shortened to Kurhessen), although it is still often referred to as Hesse-Kassel.

Hesse-Darmstadt gained a great deal of territory from the Reichsdeputationshauptschluss: the Duchy of Westphalia, formerly owned by the Electorate of Cologne, was significant, as were the acquisitions from the Electorate of Mainz and the Prince-Bishopric of Worms.

Hesse-Darmstadt left the Holy Roman Empire and joined Napoleon's Confederation of the Rhine on 12 July 1806. Hesse-Darmstadt was enlarged through the annexation of territories including Hesse-Homburg, Erbach, Solms and Wittgenstein and was elevated to the Grand Duchy of Hesse.

On 17 July Nassau-Usingen and Nassau-Weilburg joined the Confederation and on 30 August united into the Duchy of Nassau.

On 6 August 1806 the Holy Roman Empire was dissolved.

In late 1806 William I was dispossessed by Napoleon Bonaparte for his support of the Kingdom of Prussia. In 1807 Kassel became the capital of a new Kingdom of Westphalia with Napoleon's brother Jérôme Bonaparte as king. Hesse-Hanau was granted to Prince-primate Karl Theodor Anton Maria von Dalberg and was incorporated into the Grand Duchy of Frankfurt in 1810, along with Frankfurt, Aschaffenburg, Fulda and Wetzlar. The right-bank parts of the Lower County of Katzenelnbogen (Hesse-Rotenburg) were annexed to the French Empire as the Pays réservé de Catzenellenbogen.

The elector was restored following Napoleon's defeat in 1813, and although the Holy Roman Empire was now defunct, William retained his title of Prince-Elector, as it gave him pre-eminence over his cousin, the Grand Duke of Hesse. At the Congress of Vienna, the Grand Duke was forced to cede Westphalia to Prussia. In exchange for this he received a piece of territory on the left bank of the Rhine, including the important fortress at Mainz; the Grand Duchy changed its official name to the Grand Duchy of Hesse and by Rhine in 1816. Nassau's borders were significantly redrawn: it gained Lower Katzenelnbogen and the former possessions of Nassau-Dietz/Orange-Nassau (around Dillenburg and Hadamar) which had been under Berg from 1806; it lost the Siegerland (to Prussian Westphalia) and Wied (to the Prussian Grand Duchy of the Lower Rhine – the Rhine Province from 1822). Wetzlar and lands around it became Kreis Wetzlar and, until 1822 Kreis Braunfels, collectively an exclave of the Grand Duchy of the Lower Rhine. The Congress also partitioned Isenburg between the electorate and grand duchy, reinstated the Free City of Frankfurt and Hesse-Homburg as independent states and granted Fulda to the electorate. The Hessian states were now independent countries and, after 1815, members of the German Confederation.

== Later 19th century ==
Grand Duchy of Hesse in 1871

Hesse in 1900, divided between several states

Hesse-Homburg was inherited by Hesse-Darmstadt in March 1866.

In June 1866 Elector Frederick William and Grand Duke Louis III, sided with the Austrian Empire in the Austro-Prussian War. Following the Prussian victory the Electorate was annexed by Prussia and, along with the annexed Duchy of Nassau, Frankfurt and some parts of the Grand Duchy (including Hesse-Homburg and the Hessian Hinterland (Biedenkopf and Vöhl districts), see Peace Treaty of 3 September 1866) and Bavaria, Hesse-Kassel became part of the new Prussian Province of Hesse-Nassau. The northern Upper Hessian part of the Grand Duchy, now an enclave of Prussia, also became part of the North German Confederation in 1867 (along with Mainz-Kastel and Mainz-Kostheim as they lay north of the Main), making Louis a vassal in these lands; the southern part (Starkenburg and Rhenish Hesse) remained sovereign until the formation of the German Empire in 1871. Within the German Empire the Grand Dukes continued to rule their lands as vassals of the Emperor.

== 20th century ==
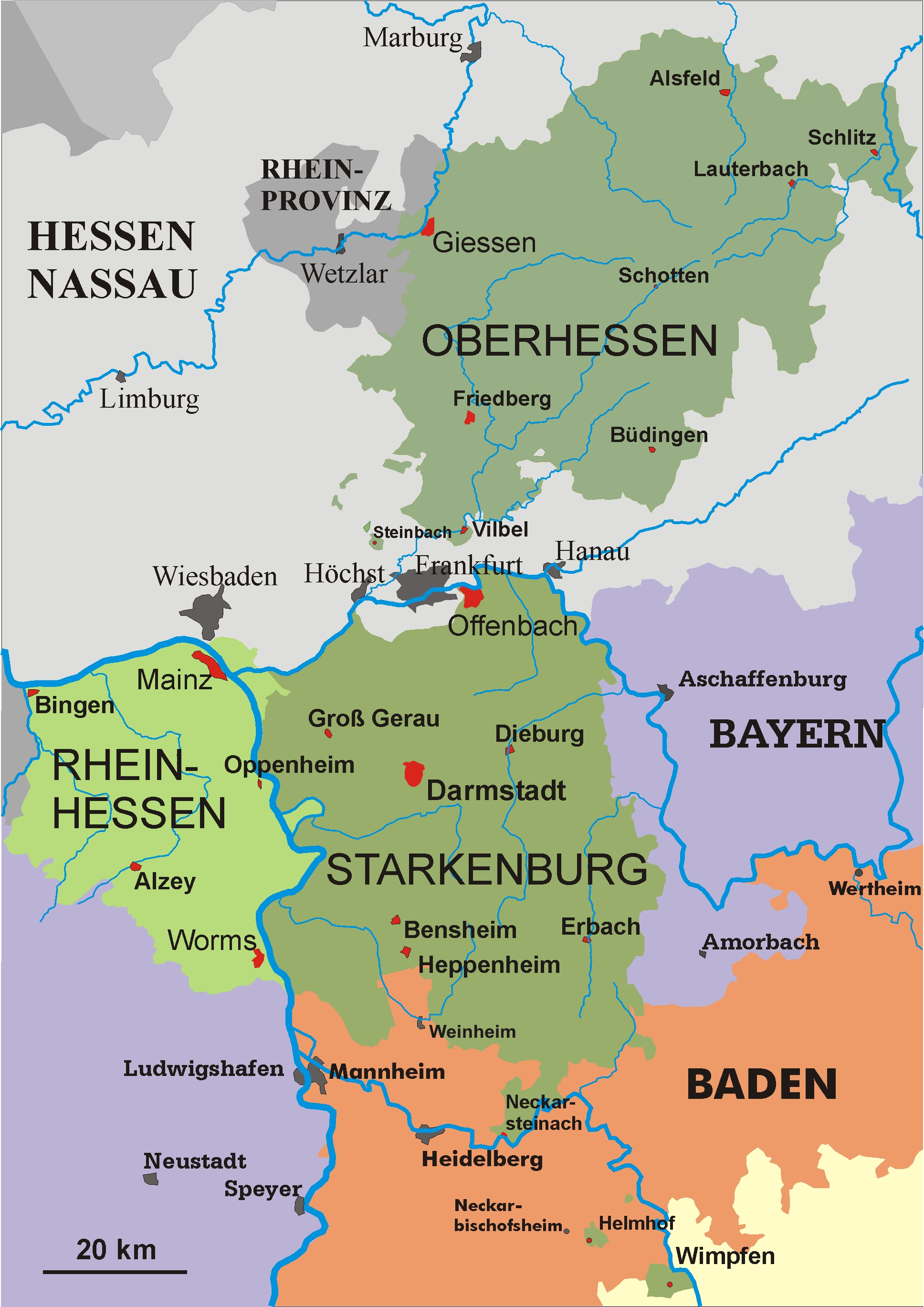
People's State of Hesse and part of Hesse-Nassau in 1930

In 1918, Prince Frederick Charles of Hesse, younger brother of the head of the house and a brother-in-law of Emperor William II, was elected by the pro-German Finnish government to be King of Finland, but he never reigned.

In 1918, following the German defeat in World War I and German Revolution, Hesse-Nassau became part of the Free State of Prussia. The last Grand Duke, Ernst Ludwig (a grandson of Queen Victoria and brother to Empress Alexandra of Russia), was forced from his throne and the Grand Duchy of Hesse became the People's State of Hesse (Volksstaat Hessen).

In 1929 Waldeck was incorporated into Hesse-Nassau (Regierungsbezirk Kassel). The Rhenish exclave of Wetzlar, which lay between Hesse-Nassau and Upper Hesse, was also incorporated in 1932 (to Regierungsbezirk Wiesbaden); at the same time the Hessian Schaumburg exclave passed to Hanover.

Within Nazi Germany a parallel system of "Gaue" was established; in Hesse there were two: Gau Kurhessen (initially Gau Hessen-Nassau-Nord) corresponded with Regierungsbezirk Kassel, while Gau Hessen-Nassau (initially Gau Hessen-Nassau-Süd) covered both Regierungsbezirk Wiesbaden and the People's State of Hesse. In 1944, the Province of Hesse-Nassau was divided into the Prussian provinces of Kurhessen and Nassau, corresponding with the Regierungsbezirke of Wiesbaden and Kassel respectively; Kassel's Schmalkalden exclave (the former Lordship of Schmalkalden which had been part of Hesse-Kassel since 1583 and before that a condominium with Henneberg since 1360) passed to Thuringia.

Greater Hesse (dark orange) in Allied-occupied Germany, 1945–1946

After World War II Kurhessen and most of Nassau and the People's State fell within the US occupation zone in Germany, and were merged to form the state of Greater Hesse (German: Großhessen). In 1946 Greater Hesse was reorganized into the modern State of Hesse. The People's State's Rhenish Hesse (Rheinhessen) and the westernmost part of Nassau/Wiesbaden (which became Regierungsbezirk Montabaur) on the other hand fell within the French occupation zone, where they became part of Rhineland-Palatinate from 1946. (Bad) Wimpfen — an exclave of the People's State — became part of Württemberg-Baden (absorbed into Baden-Württemberg in 1952), district of Sinsheim. The States of Hesse, Rhineland-Palatinate and Baden-Württemberg became federal states of West Germany in 1949.

In 1968, the head of the House of Hesse-Kassel became the head of the entire House of Hesse due to the extinction of the House of Hesse-Darmstadt.

== See also ==
- History of Frankfurt am Main and Timeline of Frankfurt
- Politics of Hesse
- Timeline of Kassel
