= Kassel (region) =

Coordinates: 51°10′N 9°25′E

- Regierungsbezirk
- Map of Hesse highlighting Kassel
- Country: Germany
- State: Hesse
- Region seat: Kassel

Government
  - District President: Mark Weinmeister (CDU)

Area
  - Total: 8,288.7 km^{2} (3,200.3 sq mi)

Population (31 December 2025)
  - Total: 1,197,263
  - Density: 144.45/km^{2} (374.11/sq mi)

GDP
  - Total: €57.802 billion (2024)
  - Per capita: €48,168 (2024)
- Website: www.rp-kassel.hessen.de

Kassel is one of the three Regierungsbezirke of Hesse, Germany, located in the north of the state. It was created in 1866 when Prussia annexed the Electorate of Hesse, forming part of the new Province of Hesse-Nassau. It was enlarged following the incorporation of the former Free State of Waldeck in 1929. From 1944 to 1945 it formed its own province: Kurhessen. After World War II it became part of Greater Hesse within the American Occupation Zone, the precursor to the modern state of Hesse. In its modern form it consists of 138 municipalities.

Kreise
(districts)
- Fulda
- Hersfeld-Rotenburg
- Kassel
- Schwalm-Eder-Kreis
- Waldeck-Frankenberg
- Werra-Meißner
Kreisfreie Städte
(district-free cities)
- Kassel

== Economy ==
The Gross domestic product (GDP) of the region was €45.4 billion in 2018, accounting for 1.4% of German economic output. GDP per capita adjusted for purchasing power was €34,200 or 113% of the EU27 average in the same year. The GDP per employee was 96% of the EU average.
