= Bombing of Kassel in World War II =

Kassel World War II bombings
- Part of Strategic bombing campaign in Europe
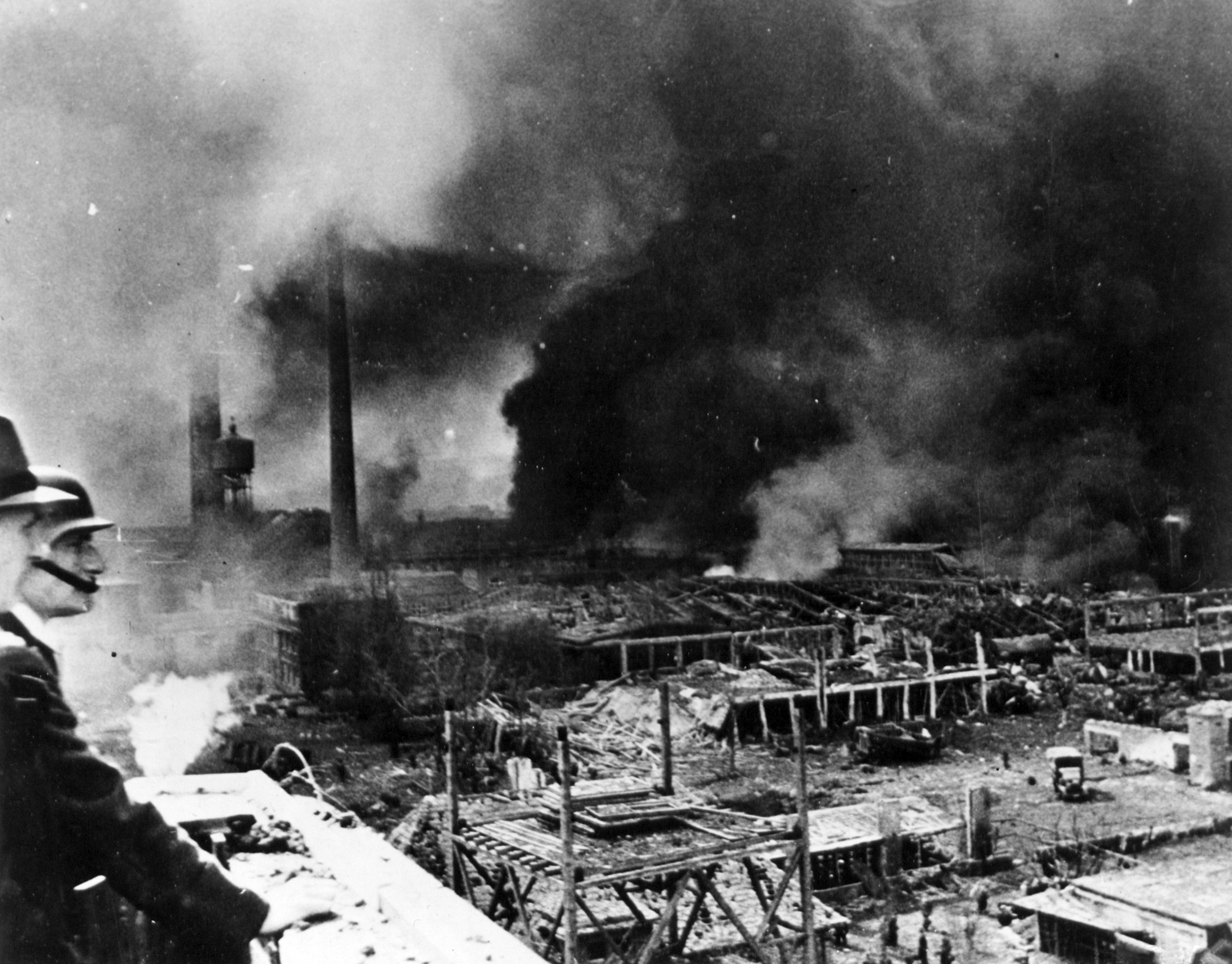
- Two people observing fires ravaging the Bettenhausen district after bombing
Date	1942–1945
Location	Kassel, Germany

Belligerents
United States; United Kingdom	Nazi Germany

Commanders and leaders
Carl Spaatz (May 1942 – ) Arthur Harris (1941–)	Gauleiters, Karl Weinrich, Karl Gerland

The Kassel World War II bombings were a set of Allied strategic bombing attacks which took place from February 1942 to March 1945. In a single deadliest raid on 22–23 October 1943, 150,000 inhabitants were bombed-out, at least 6,000 people died, the vast majority of the city center was destroyed, and the fire of the most severe air raid burned for seven days. When the US First Army captured Kassel on 3 April 1945, only 50,000 inhabitants remained of its 1939 population of 236,000.

== Targets ==
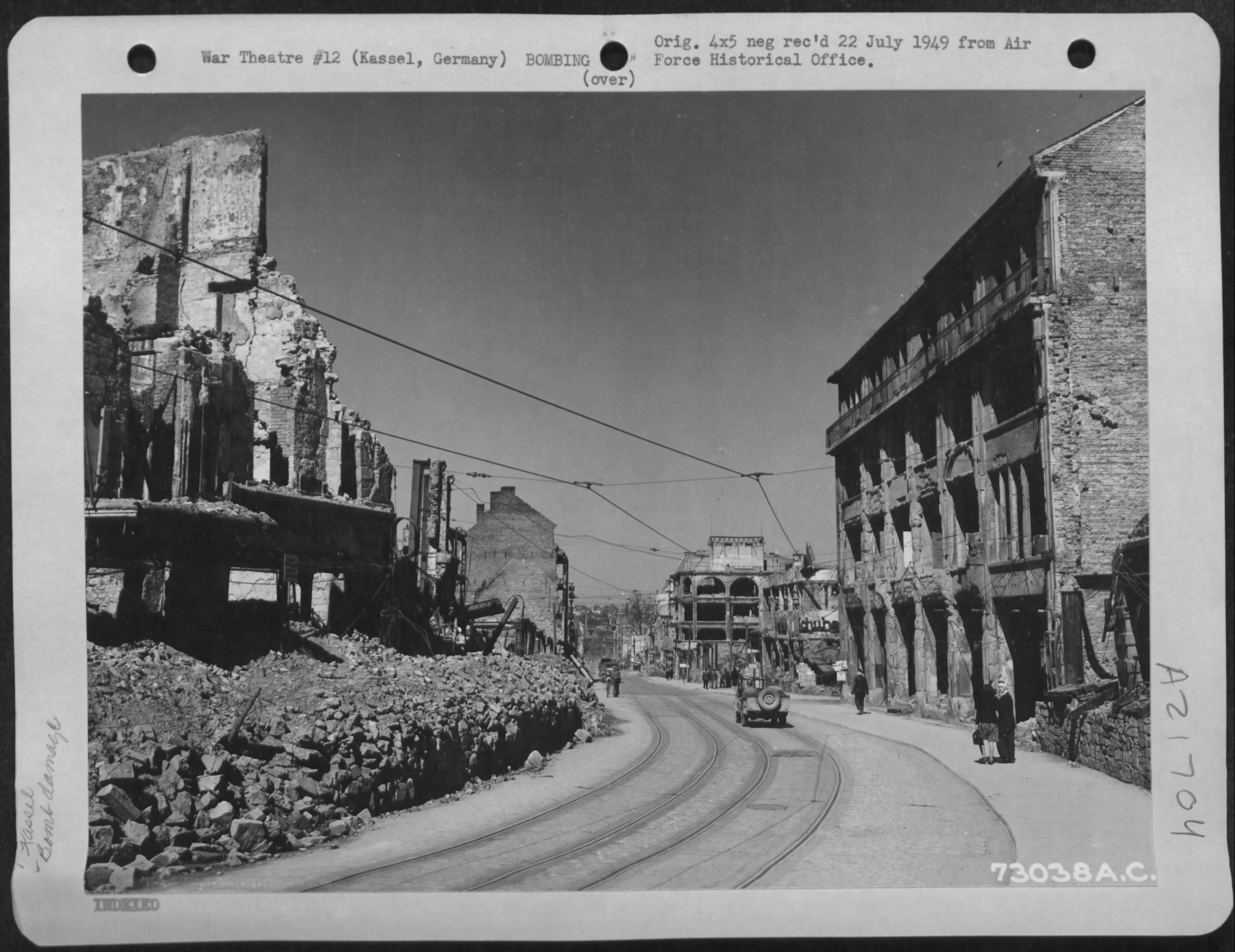
Bomb damaged buildings in Kassel, Untere Königsstraße

As well as being the capital of the provinces of Hesse-Nassau and Kurhessen, Kassel had some important targets:

- Fieseler aircraft facility
- Henschel & Sohn facilities, maker of the Tiger I and King Tiger heavy tanks
- The Henschel & Sohn firm's locomotive plant
- engine plant
- motor transport plant
- railway works
- Military HQs at Wehrkreis IX, and Bereich Hauptsitz Kassel
- Central Germany HQ, highway & railway construction
- Regional Supreme Court

== Bombing raids ==
Bombing raids on Kassel during World War II
Date	Target	
17/18 February 1942		10 Wellingtons and 3 Stirlings to Emden, Hamburg, Kassel and Aachen.
27/28 August 1942	Henschel	306 aircraft destroyed/seriously damaged 144/317 buildings, particularly in the city southwest. Three Henschel buildings were seriously damaged, and 43/251 were killed/injured.
8/9 September 1942		Nearly 100 aircraft hit several armament factories, and destroyed the railway station, the Red Palace, and the Museum Fridericianum, home of the Kassel State Library, along with 350,000 books, seven-eighths of the library's entire book collection.
2/3 October 1943		The Pathfinder Force (PFF) was not able to find the center of the city, and most bombs into Ihringshausen and Bettenhausen. In addition to considerable damage, an ammunition store was hit.
3/4 October 1943		547 aircraft used H2S radar; the main weight of bombs fell on the western suburbs and outlying towns and villages.
22/23 October 1943	city centre	569 bombers dropped more than 1,800 tons of bombs (including 460,000 magnesium fire sticks) in a concentrated pattern. For deception, the attack used Operation Corona radio spoofing and a Frankfurt diversionary raid. The blaze caused a minor firestorm similar in nature to that at Hamburg. Damage to the main telephone exchange and the city's water pipes hindered firefighting efforts.
18/19 March 1944		11 Mosquitos on a diversionary raid.
30/31 March 1944		34 Mosquitos on diversionary raids to Aachen, Cologne and Kassel.
27/28 September 1944		46 Mosquitos on a diversionary raid.
28 September 1944	Henschel motor transport plant	Mission 652: 243 of 262 dispatched B-24s bombed the Kassel/Henschel motor transport plant.
3/4 October 1944		43 Mosquitos.
15/16 October 1944		2 Mosquitos on a diversionary raid.
9/10 November 1944		3 Mosquitos.
27/28 December 1944		7 Mosquitos on Oboe (navigation) trials (some flew over Kassel).
6/7 January 1945		20 Mosquitos.
18/19 January 1945		12 Mosquitos.
21/22 January 1945		76 Mosquitos
2/3 March 1945		67 Mosquitos on a training raid.
8/9 March 1945		176 aircraft; the last heavy raid by the RAF on Kassel.
18/19 March 1945		24 Mosquitos.
20/21 March 1945		16 Mosquitos on a diversionary raid.

External images
- Before and after the bombings After the bombing in 1943

== See also ==
- List of strategic bombing over Germany in World War II

== Sources ==
- Werner Dettmar: Die Zerstörung Kassels im Oktober 1943. Hesse, Fuldabrück 1983, ISBN 3-924259-00-3
- Gebhard Aders: Bombenkrieg/Strategien der Zerstörung. licoverlag 2004
