= Timeline of Kassel =

The following is a timeline of the history of the city of Kassel, Germany.

== Prior to 19th century ==
Map of Kassel and the surrounding area (1789)

- 1462 - Martinskirche, Kassel (church) built.
- 1502 - Hofkapelle (orchestra) founded.
- 1593 - Marstall (Kassel) built.
- 1594 - Printer Wilhelm Wessel in business.
- 1606 - Ottoneum (theatre) built.
- 1626 - Population: 6,329.^{(de)}
- 1709 - Collegium Carolinum (Kassel) (school) founded.
- 1710 - Karlskirche (Kassel) (church) built.
- 1731 - Casselische Zeitung von Policey (newspaper) begins publication.
- 1761 - Siege of Cassel (1761): Cassel successfully defended by the French.
- 1762 - Siege of Cassel (1762): Cassel was captured by the Germans from the French.
- 1767 - Königsplatz (Kassel) (square) laid out.
- 1768 - Friedrichsplatz (Kassel) (square) laid out.
- 1769 - Opera house built on Königsstraße (Kassel).
- 1777 - Art school established.
- 1779 - Fridericianum museum opens.
- 1798 - Schloss Wilhelmshöhe (palace) built.

== 19th century ==
- 1807 - Became the capital of the Kingdom of Westphalia.
- 1810 - Population: 23,068.^{(de)}
- 1813 - Bombarded and captured by the Russian general Chernichev;
- 1836 - Verein für Naturkunde (society) founded.
- 1848 - Kassel–Warburg railway begins operating.
- 1850/51 - Occupied by the Prussians.
- 1866
  - Prussian XI Army Corps headquartered in Kassel.
  - Kassel becomes seat of province Hesse-Nassau in Prussia.
- 1877 - Steam tram begins operating.
- 1880 - Population: 58,290.
- 1885 - Population: 64,083.
- 1895 - Population: 81,752.
- 1899 - Wehlheiden becomes part of Kassel.
- 1900 - Population: 106,034.

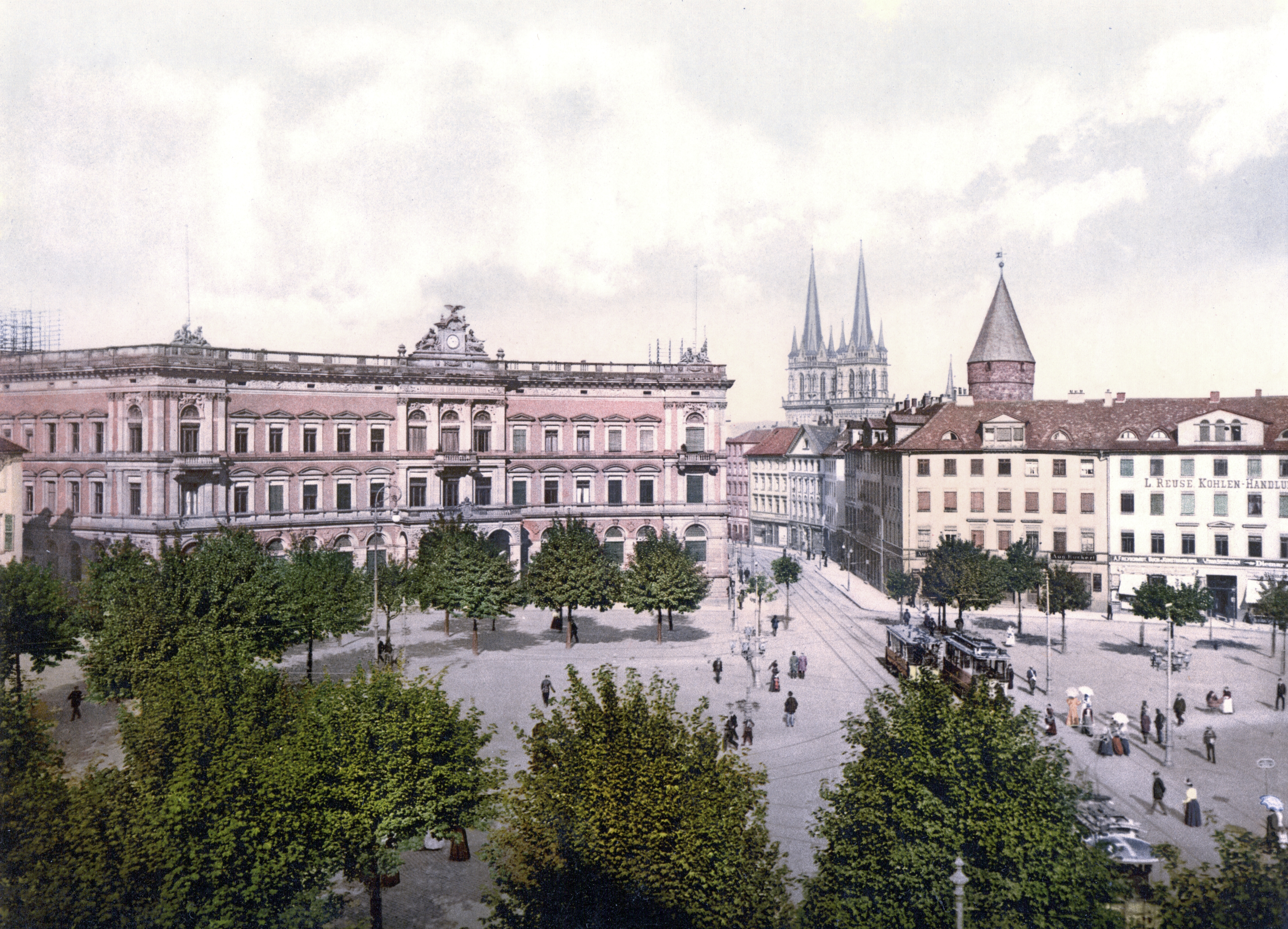
Kassel at the turn of the 19th and 20th centuries

== 20th century ==
- 1905 - Population: 120,446.
- 1906 - Bettenhausen, Kirchditmold, Rothenditmold, and Wahlershausen become part of Kassel.
- 1909
  - Neue Hoftheater (theatre) built.
  - Population: 150,577.^{(de)}
- 1914 - Stadthalle Kassel built.
- 1926 - Gutsbezirk Fasanenhof becomes part of Kassel.
- 1928 - Gutsbezirk Oberförsterei Kirchditmold, Kragenhof, Oberförsterei Ehlen, and Wilhelmshöhe become part of Kassel.
- 1936
  - Harleshausen, Niederzwehren, Nordshausen, Oberzwehren, Waldau, and Wolfsanger become part of Kassel.
  - Population: 203,418.^{(de)}
- 1939 - Nazi camp for Sinti and Romani people established (see also Porajmos).
- 1942 - Bombing of Kassel in World War II begins.
- 1943 - July: Kassel-Druseltal subcamp of the Buchenwald concentration camp established. The prisoners were mostly Poles and Russians.
- 1944 - October: Several prisoners escaped from the Kassel-Druseltal subcamp of Buchenwald.
- 1945
  - 29 March: Kassel-Druseltal subcamp of Buchenwald dissolved. Escape of many prisoners during their deportation to the main Buchenwald camp.
  - 1–4 April: Battle of Kassel (1945); Allied forces win.
  - Hessischen Nachrichten newspaper begins publication.
- 1955
  - National Bundesgartenschau 1955 (garden show) held in Kassel.
  - "Documenta" quinquennial art exhibition begins.

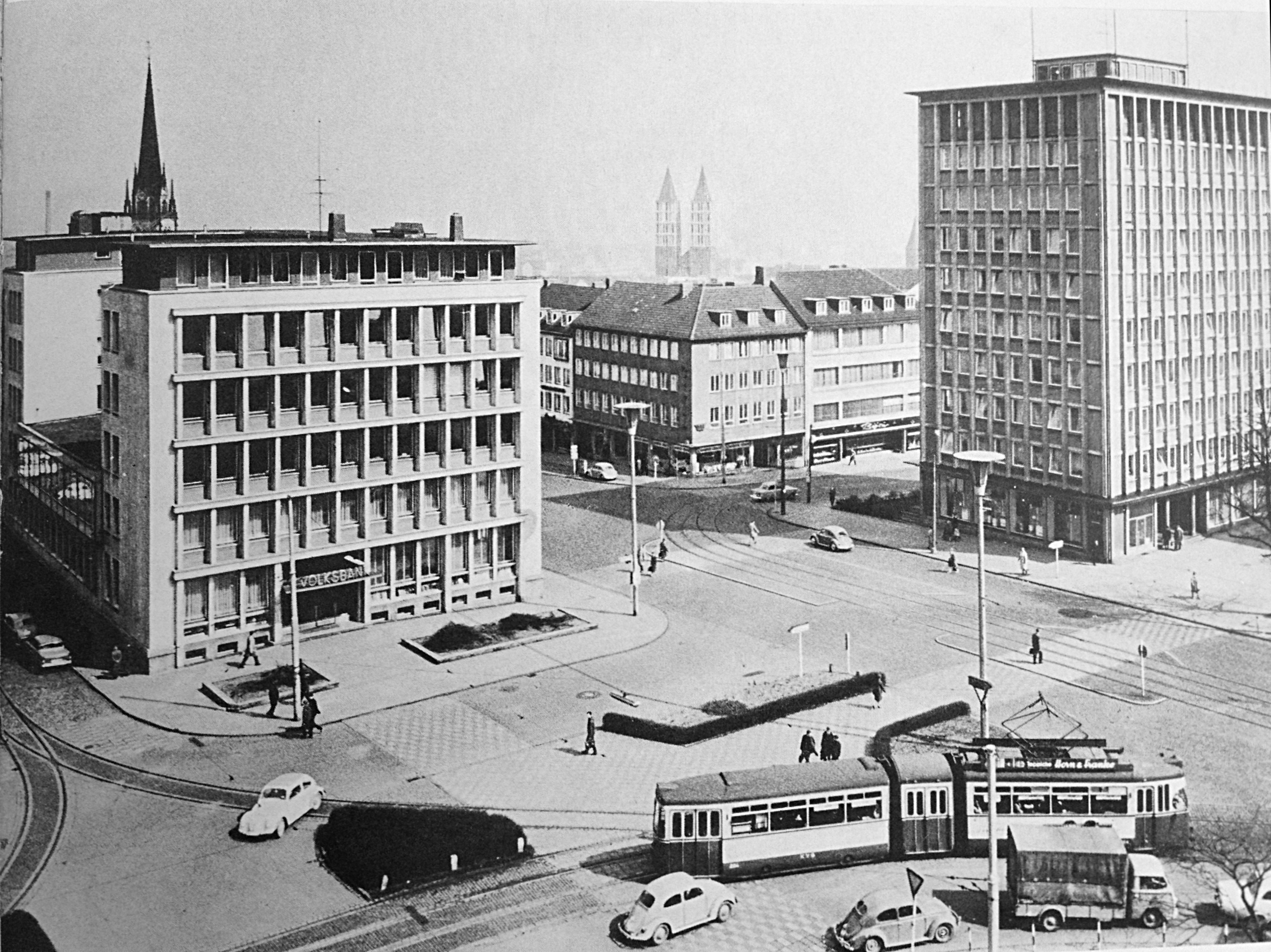
Kassel in 1958

- 1959 - Staatstheater Kassel built.
- 1960
  - Kassel Hauptbahnhof (train station) rebuilt.
  - Brüder Grimm-Museum Kassel opens.
- 1971 - University of Kassel established.
- 1972 - Kassel (district) formed in the state of Hesse.
- 1976 - New Gallery (Kassel) opens.
- 1977 - Eissporthalle Kassel (ice rink) opens.
- 1981 - National Bundesgartenschau 1981 (garden show) held in Kassel.
- 1985 - Population: 184,466.^{(de)}

== 21st century ==
- 2005
  - Scheidemannplatz (square) remodelled.
  - Bertram Hilgen becomes mayor.
- 2007
  - Kassel RegioTram begins operating.
  - Kassel Marathon begins.
- 2013 - Theater im Centrum opens.
- 2014 - Mevlana Mosque (Kassel-Oberzwehren) built.
- 2015 - Population: 200,507.^{(de)}

== See also ==
- History of Kassel
- Stadtarchiv Kassel (city archives)
- History of Hesse

Other cities in the state of Hesse:^{(de)}

- Timeline of Frankfurt

== Bibliography ==
=== in English ===
- "Cassel". Bradshaw's Illustrated Hand-book to Germany. London: W.J. Adams & Sons. 1876.
- "Cassel". Handbook for North Germany. Murray's hand-book Rhine & North Germany (20th ed.). London: J. Murray. 1886. hdl:2027/hvd.hn1imr.
- "Cassel". Chambers's Encyclopaedia. London. 1901. hdl:2027/njp.32101065312876.
- "Cassel", Jewish Encyclopedia, vol. 3, New York, 1902, hdl:2027/mdp.49015002282292
- "Cassel", Northern Germany (15th ed.), Leipzig: Karl Baedeker, 1910, OCLC 78390379
- "Cassel (Germany)" . Encyclopædia Britannica. Vol. 5 (11th ed.). 1910. pp. 457–458.

=== in German ===
- David August von Apell (1831). Cassel und dessen Umgebungen (in German). OCLC 174331391.
- G. A. Lobe (1837). Wanderungen durch Cassel und die Umgegend (in German). Krieger.
- Franz Carl Theodor Piderit (1844). Geschichte der Haupt- und Residenzstadt Kassel (in German). W. Appel.
- "Cassel". Biblioteca geographica: Verzeichniss der Seit der Mitte des vorigen Jahrhunderts bis zu Ende des Jahres 1856 in Deutschland (in German). Leipzig: Wilhelm Engelmann. 1858. (bibliography)
- "Cassel". Brockhaus' Konversations-Lexikon (in German). Vol. 3 (14th ed.). Leipzig: Brockhaus. 1896. hdl:2027/njp.32101064064452.
- NN (1910). Kreis Cassel (in German). Marburg. doi:10.11588/DIGLIT.12580 – via Heidelberg University Library, Heidelberger historische Bestände - digital.
- Cassel und Wilhelmshöhe. Griebens Reiseführer (in German). 1919.
- Gerhard Köbler (2007). "Kassel". Historisches Lexikon der Deutschen Länder (in German) (7th ed.). Munich: C.H. Beck. p. 327. ISBN 978-3-406-54986-1.
- Hessen I: Regierungsbezirke Gießen und Kassel. Handbuch der Deutschen Kunstdenkmäler (in German). Deutscher Kunstverlag. 2008. ISBN 978-3-422-03092-3.
- Wolfgang Adam; Siegrid Westphal, eds. (2012). "Kassel". Handbuch kultureller Zentren der Frühen Neuzeit: Städte und Residenzen im alten deutschen Sprachraum (in German). De Gruyter. pp. 1037–1092. ISBN 978-3-11-029555-9.
