= Werner Zschintzsch =

German lawyer and civil servant (1888–1953)

State Secretary Reich and Prussian Ministry of Science, Education and Culture
- In office 31 March 1936 – 8 May 1945
- Preceded by: Siegmund Kunisch (Acting)
- Succeeded by: Position abolished

Regierungspräsident Wiesbaden District
- In office 15 February 1933 – 1 March 1936
- Preceded by: Fritz Ehrler
- Succeeded by: Friedrich Pfeffer von Salomon

Personal details
- Born: 26 January 1888 Roßla, Kingdom of Prussia, German Empire
- Died: 1 July 1953 (aged 65) Göttingen, Lower Saxony, West Germany
- Party: Nazi Party
- Other political affiliations: German National People's Party
- Education: University of Lausanne; Ludwig-Maximilians-Universität München; Humboldt University of Berlin; Martin Luther University Halle-Wittenberg
- Profession: Lawyer

Military service
- Allegiance: German Empire
- Branch/service: Imperial German Army
- Years of service: 1914–1918
- Rank: Oberleutnant
- Unit: Field Artillery Regiment 74
- Commands: Field Artillery Regiments 92 & 302
- Battles/wars: World War I
- Awards: Iron Cross, 1st and 2nd class

Werner Zschintzsch (26 January 1888 – 1 July 1953) was a German administrative lawyer and civil servant. He served as the Regierungspräsident of Wiesbaden District and as the State Secretary of the Reich and Prussian Ministry of Science, Education and Culture in Nazi Germany. He was also an SS-Oberführer.

== Early life ==
Zschintzsch was born in Roßla (today, Südharz), the son of a forestry official. He attended Volksschule in his hometown and then the monastery high school in Ilfeld. From 1906, he studied law and political science at the University of Lausanne, the Ludwig-Maximilians-Universität München, the Humboldt University of Berlin, and the Martin Luther University Halle-Wittenberg. After passing his Referendar examination in Naumburg on 3 July 1909, he began his legal clerkship at the court in Roßla. From 1909 to 1910, he performed military service as a one-year volunteer reserve officer in the Torgau Field Artillery Regiment 74 in Wittenberg. From 1911 to 1914, he was employed as a Regierungsreferendar (government apprentice lawyer) in the Merseburg District. On the outbreak of the First World War, Zschintzsch returned to active military service as a Leutnant, serving as a battery officer with his old regiment. He became a battery commander in 1916 with Field Artillery Regiments 92 and 302 until the end of the war in November 1918. He was promoted to Oberleutnant in summer 1918 and was discharged in December, having been awarded the Iron Cross, 1st and 2nd class.

== Legal career in the Weimar Republic ==
Returning to civilian life, Zschintzsch resumed his legal career, having passed his Assessor examination on 13 November 1915 while on military leave. From 1919 to 1920, he was employed as the administrator of the Kreis Schwetz District in Schwetz, (today, Świecie), working as a commissioner for the transfer of the district to Poland under the terms of the Versailles Treaty. After the transfer, he became a department head at the Marienwerder District government in Marienwerder (today, Kwidzyn) on 16 September 1920. In January 1922, he attained the position of Regierungsrat (Government Councilor). On 13 January 1925, he became a consultant in the municipal affairs department of the Prussian Ministry of the Interior in Berlin where he remained until February 1933, being promoted to Oberregierungsrat on 1 April 1925 and to Ministerialrat (Ministerial Councilor) on 1 August 1926.

== Career in Nazi Germany ==
Zschintzsch belonged to the conservative and nationalist German National People's Party (DNVP), which entered into a coalition government with the Nazis on 30 January 1933. He replaced the Social Democrat Fritz Ehrler as Acting Regierungspräsident of the Wiesbaden District on 20 February 1933. After joining the Nazi Party on 1 May 1933, (membership number 3,495,469) his appointment was made permanent on 15 June. In 1934, he was appointed to the Prussian Provincial Council from the Province of Hesse-Nassau. On 14 March 1936, Zschintzsch was charged with the leadership of the affairs of the State Secretary in the Reich and Prussian Ministry of Science, Education and Culture under Reichsminister Bernhard Rust, and was formally named State Secretary on 31 March. He would retain this post through the end of the Nazi regime. In May 1936, he was appointed to the Prussian State Council by Prussian Minister President Hermann Göring. He was a member of Hans Frank's Academy for German Law and, in 1938, he was awarded the Golden Party Badge. On 1 July 1939, he was made an Ehrenbürger (honorary citizen) of the Goethe University Frankfurt and, in 1940, became chairman of the German-Hungarian Cultural Committee.

The Nazi regime engaged in a policy of "Nazification" of the educational system from first grade through the university level. This included requiring all teachers to belong to the National Socialist Teachers League that ensured all educators complied with teaching according to National Socialist doctrines. Jews were forbidden from the teaching professions, and the curriculum included the teaching of "racial sciences" that extolled Germans as the "master race". Education was nationalized, being transferred from the jurisdiction of local and state governments to that of the Ministry of Education. During Zschintzsch's tenure in office, a ministry decree was issued on 15 November 1938, expelling all Jewish students from universities and secondary schools in the aftermath of the assassination in Paris of the German diplomat Ernst vom Rath by a Jew on 9 November. It was signed by Zschintzsch and stated:

After the heinous murder in Paris, German schoolteachers can no longer be expected to teach Jewish children. It is also self-evident that it is intolerable for German children to have to share a classroom with Jews. Although racial segregation has been applied in the school system as a whole in the last few years, a number of Jewish pupils have remained in German schools. These pupils can no longer be allowed to attend school together with German boys and girls. Subject to further legislation, I therefore order the following with immediate effect: 1. Jews are not permitted to attend German schools. They may only attend Jewish schools. Any Jewish pupils currently attending German schools are to be expelled immediately, if this has not already occurred.

In addition to his governmental positions, Zschintzsch also served in a Nazi Party paramilitary organization. On 16 June 1936, he joined the Allgemeine SS (SS number 276,657) with the rank of SS-Standartenführer and was assigned to the SS Main Office. On 30 January 1937, he was promoted to SS-Oberführer and assigned to the staff of the Reichsführer-SS where he served until May 1945.

== Post-war period ==
Towards the end of the Second World War in Europe, Zschintzsch moved to Flensburg as part of the so-called Flensburg government of the newly installed Reichspräsident Karl Dönitz's administration. There, he was arrested on 23 May 1945 by British army troops, was interned from 1945 to 1948 in Camp Ashcan in Luxembourg, Dachau internment camp and in Darmstadt, and was interrogated several times in 1947 as part of the Nuremberg Trials. During the interrogations, he denied knowing anything about the crimes of the Nazi regime and asserted that he only found out about them after the end of the war.

After being released from captivity, Zschintzsch retired and lived in Bovenden. In 1949, he underwent a denazification proceeding in Göttingen and was classified as a "lesser offender". On appeal before the Hildesheim tribunal, he was reassessed as a "follower". Due to his SS membership, the Bielefeld court imposed a fine and a four-month prison sentence, which was waived in consideration of time served. He died in Göttingen on 1 July 1953.

== Sources ==
- Heim, Suzanne; Pearce, Caroline (2019). The Persecution and Murder of the European Jews by Nazi Germany, 1933 1945: German Reich 1938 August 1939. Vol. 2. Walter de Gruyter. ISBN 978-3-110-52371-3.
- Klee, Ernst (2007). Das Kulturlexikon zum Dritten Reich. Wer war was vor und nach 1945. Frankfurt am Main: Fischer S. Verlag GmbH. ISBN 978-3-10-039326-5.
- Lilla, Joachim (2005). Der Preußische Staatsrat 1921–1933: Ein biographisches Handbuch. Düsseldorf: Droste Verlag. ISBN 978-3-770-05271-4.
- Schiffer Publishing Ltd., ed. (2000). SS Officers List: SS-Standartenführer to SS-Oberstgruppenführer (As of 30 January 1942). Schiffer Military History Publishing. ISBN 0-7643-1061-5.
- Shirer, William (1960). The Rise and Fall of the Third Reich. New York: Simon and Schuster. ISBN 978-0-831-77404-2.
- Werner Zschintzsch entry (p.548) in Das Deutsche Führerlexikon 1934-1935
- Werner Zschintzsch entry in the Files of the Reich Chancellery
- Werner Zschintzsch entry in the Hessian Regional History Information System (LAGIS)
- Werner Zschintzsch entry in Officials of the National Socialist Reich Ministries
- Werner Zschintzsch Interrogations for the Nuremberg Trials on 19 May, 12 June and 11 December 1947, in the archive of the Institute for Contemporary History, Munich, Signature ZS-1670-1 1948/56 (online, PDF, 2.8 MB).
- Zilch, Reinhold and Holtz, Bärbel: (2001): The Protocols of the Prussian Ministry of State (Acta Borussica, Volume 12/II), Hildesheim: Olms-Weidmann, p. 737, ISBN 3-487-12704-0.
