= Karl Weinrich =

German Nazi Party official (1887–1973)

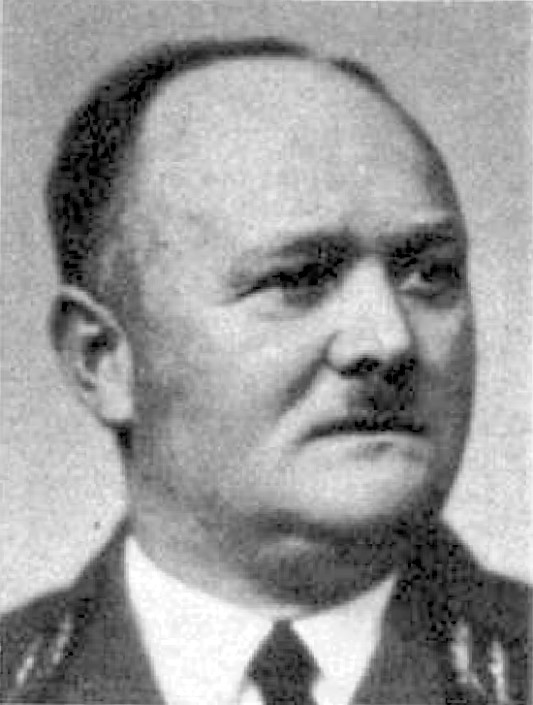
- Karl Weinrich in 1938

Gauleiter of Gau Kurhessen
- Acting from 1 September 1927
- In office 1 February 1928 – 6 November 1943
- Preceded by: Walter Schultz (Gauleiter)
- Succeeded by: Karl Gerland

Deputy Gauleiter of Gau Hesse-Nassau North
- In office 1925 – 1 February 1928

Personal details
- Born: 2 December 1887 Molmeck, Province of Saxony, Kingdom of Prussia, German Empire
- Died: 22 July 1973 (aged 85) Hausen, Hesse, West Germany
- Party: Nazi Party (NSDAP)
- Occupation: Soldier; Bureaucrat
- Awards: Golden Party Badge

Military service
- Allegiance: German Empire
- Branch/service: Imperial German Army
- Years of service: 1906–1920
- Unit: 28th Infantry Regiment, "von Goeben"
- Battles/wars: World War I

Karl Otto Paul Weinrich (2 December 1887 – 22 July 1973) was a German professional soldier who fought in the First World War. He became a Nazi Party official and politician who was the long-serving Gauleiter of Gau Kurhessen. During the Second World War, he was removed from his post for abandoning Kassel during a bombing raid. After the German surrender, he was interned and underwent denazification proceedings in which he was found to be a major offender and was sentenced to jail.

== Early life ==
Weinrich was born in Molmeck (today, Hettstedt) the son of a shoe manufacturer. After attending Volksschule and a mining vocational school there, he worked briefly as a mining trainee of copper, silver and iron ore. He then volunteered for the Royal Prussian Army in 1906, assigned to the 28th Infantry Regiment, "von Goeben," working as an administrative clerk and attaining the rank of Sergeant by 1912.

During the First World War he was employed in an army provisions office in Germany. After the war, Weinrich worked in a government supply office from 1920, first in Cologne and from 1920 in Landau in the Rhenish Palatinate. Becoming politically active, he joined the Deutschvölkischer Schutz- und Trutzbund, the largest and most influential antisemitic, Völkisch organization in Germany.

In February 1922, Weinrich joined the Nazi Party and founded local groups (Ortsgruppen) in Landau and other towns in the Palatinate. At this time, he was active in opposition to the French occupation of the Rhineland. In May 1923, Weinrich was sentenced by a French military court to four months imprisonment due to his nationalist activities and anti-French agitation. However, Weinrich fled across the Rhine, settled in Kassel and found employment as a laborer. In 1924, he joined the Reich Compensation Office as a tax secretary.

== Nazi Party career ==
Meanwhile, the Party had been banned in the wake of the failed Beer Hall Putsch in November 1923. After the ban was lifted, Weinrich immediately rejoined it in February 1925 (membership number 24,291). He co-founded the Ortsgruppe in Kassel, becoming the Ortsgruppenleiter (local group leader). He also served from 1925 to 1927 as Treasurer and Deputy Gauleiter of Gau Hesse-Nassau North. On 1 September 1927, he became Acting Gauleiter, when Walter Schultz was placed on leave of absence, and was named permanent Gauleiter on 1 February 1928. The Gau was renamed Gau Kurhessen on 1 January 1934.

Weinrich failed in his bid to be elected to the Landtag of Prussia on 20 May 1928. However, on 17 November 1929, he became a city councilor in Kassel, a member of its municipal parliament, and of the provincial parliament of the Province of Hesse-Nassau. On 14 October 1930, he was elected to the Prussian Landtag, serving until October 1933, and was a member of its executive committee from May 1932. From 1933, he was a member of the Prussian Provincial Council for Hesse-Nassau and also was the deputy representative of the province to the Reichsrat until its abolition on 14 February 1934. From 11 July 1933 to 1945, he was a member of the Prussian State Council and, from 12 November 1933 to May 1945, he was a member of the Reichstag for electoral constituency 19, Hesse-Nassau.

A member of the paramilitary National Socialist Motor Corps, he reached the rank of NSKK-Obergruppenführer on 30 January 1939. He was a holder of the Golden Party Badge.

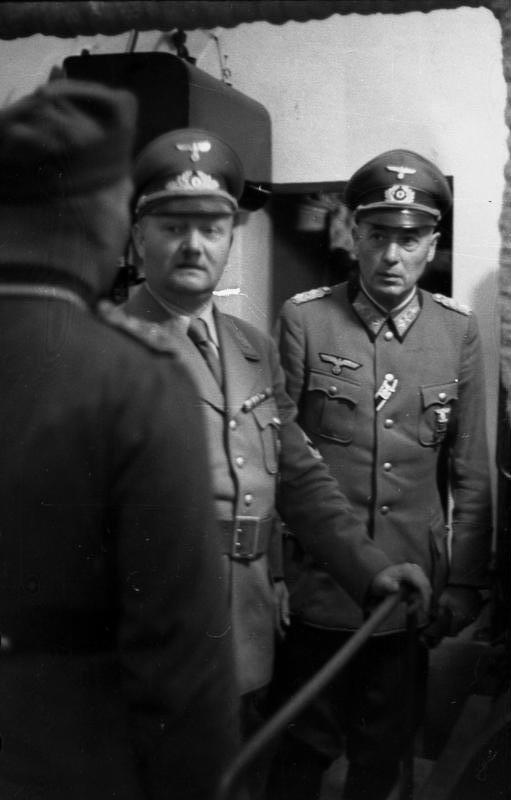
Karl Weinrich (middle), touring a Rhine River fortification

=== The war years ===
After the outbreak of World War II, Weinrich was made a member of the Defense Committee for Wehrkreis (Military District) IX which included Gau Kurhessen. On 15 November 1940, he was made the Housing Commissioner for his Gau, and on 6 April 1942 became the Gau representative of the Plenipotentiary for Labor Allocation, Fritz Sauckel. On 16 November 1942, when the jurisdiction for the Reich Defense Commissioners was changed from the Wehrkreis to the Gau level, he was appointed commissioner for his Gau. In this capacity, he had responsibility for civil defense and evacuation measures, as well as control over the war economy, including rationing and suppression of black market activities. Shortly after the massive incendiary air raid on Kassel of 22 October 1943, which destroyed the entire city center, Weinrich was charged with failing in Kassel's war preparations and abandoning the city to its fate during the bombing, returning only to check on the condition of his own property.

Reichsminister of Propaganda, Joseph Goebbels, wrote a scathing report to Hitler and commented in his diary:

Weinrich has in no way proven equal to the demands made on him by the recent air raid. The entire center of the city and most of the outlying sections have been destroyed. A gruesome picture strikes the eye … Much may have been prevented or at least mitigated if suitable preparations had been taken by the Gau leadership … Weinrich played a very sorry role … I shall certainly report to the Führer the pitiful role he played as Gauleiter and urge that he be quickly replaced.

Weinrich was placed on extended leave from his posts on 6 November 1943 and was retired to his farming estate in Trendelburg for the remainder of the war. His successor was Karl Gerland, then the Deputy Gauleiter in Reichsgau Lower Danube. Gerland was made the permanent Gauleiter on 13 December 1944.

== Postwar life ==
After Germany surrendered, Weinrich was interned in the Eselheide internment camp from 1945 to 1950. He underwent denazification proceedings and was adjudged to be in Category I, Major Offenders. On 6 July 1949, he was sentenced to ten years imprisonment in a labor camp by the Kassel Chamber of Justice. In November 1950 he was released, in consideration of time served. He returned to Trendelburg, then to Hausen (today, Obertshausen) and finally back to Kassel at the beginning of the 1960s. In 1960, the court in Kassel denied his request for compensation for loss of property during the wartime air raid. He died on 22 July 1973.

== Sources ==
- Höffkes, Karl (1986). Hitlers Politische Generale. Die Gauleiter des Dritten Reiches: ein biographisches Nachschlagewerk. Tübingen: Grabert-Verlag. ISBN 3-87847-163-7.
- Lengemann, Jochen: MdL Hessen. 1808–1996. Biographischer Index (= Politische und parlamentarische Geschichte des Landes Hessen. Bd. 14 = Veröffentlichungen der Historischen Kommission für Hessen. Bd. 48, 7). Elwert, Marburg 1996, ISBN 3-7708-1071-6.
- Miller, Michael D.; Schulz, Andreas (2021). Gauleiter: The Regional Leaders of the Nazi Party and Their Deputies, 1925 - 1945. Vol. 3 (Fritz Sauckel - Hans Zimmermann). Fonthill Media. ISBN 978-1-781-55826-3.
- Weinrich, Karl Otto Paul. Hessische Biografie. In: Landesgeschichtliches Informationssystem Hessen (LAGIS).
- Karl Weinrich in the Rheinland-Pfälzische Personendatenbank
