= Walter Schultz (Gauleiter) =

German Nazi Party official and politician (1874–1953)

Gauleiter of Gau Hesse-Nassau
- In office April 1925 – December 1925
- Preceded by: Position established
- Succeeded by: Position abolished

Gauleiter of Gau Hesse-Nassau North
- In office December 1925 – 1 February 1928
- Preceded by: Position established
- Succeeded by: Karl Weinrich

Acting Gauleiter of Hesse-Nassau South
- In office 22 September 1926 – 1 October 1926
- Preceded by: Anton Haselmayer
- Succeeded by: Karl Linder

Landrat (District Administrator) Landkreis Kassel
- In office 23 July 1934 – 28 April 1937

Landrat (District Administrator) Landkreis Eschwege
- In office 28 April 1937 – 8 May 1945

Personal details
- Born: 27 November 1874 Lautenburg, Province of West Prussia, Kingdom of Prussia, German Empire
- Died: 8 August 1953 (aged 78) Kassel, Hesse, West Germany
- Party: National Socialist German Workers' Party (NSDAP)
- Education: PhD
- Alma mater: Leipzig University; Marburg University
- Profession: Teacher

Military service
- Allegiance: German Empire
- Branch/service: Imperial German Army
- Years of service: 1894–1897; 1914–1918
- Rank: Hauptmann
- Unit: Baden Pioneer Battalions #14 and #19
- Battles/wars: World War I
- Awards: Iron Cross, 1st class and 2nd class

Walter Schultz (27 November 1874 – 8 August 1953) was an official of the Nazi Party who served as the Party Gauleiter in Hesse-Nassau, as well as in several governmental posts.

== Early life ==
Schultz was born the son of a farmer in Lautenburg in West Prussia (today, Lidzbark, Poland). He went to the Gymnasium and graduated in 1894. He then entered military service as a Fahnenjunker (officer cadet) in the Baden Pioneer Battalion 14, headquartered in Kehl. He attended military school in Anklam and was commissioned a Leutnant in April 1896. He was then assigned to Pioneer Battalion 19 based in Strasbourg. On 18 November 1897, he transferred to the reserves and then returned to school. He studied mathematics and natural sciences at Leipzig University and the Marburg University, receiving a PhD in December 1902. He then passed the state teacher's examination and began teaching at the secondary level in a Realschule in Kassel. In October 1904, he was appointed a head teacher. Around this time, he began to be active in the Völkisch movement.

Schultz returned to active military service as an Oberleutnant in World War I. He served from 1914 to 1918, was wounded in action and received the Iron Cross, 1st and 2nd class. At the end of the war, he left the service with the rank of Hauptmann in the reserves. He resumed his teaching career at a Gymnasium in Kassel. By 1924, he was a member of the Völkisch-Social Bloc, a right-wing political alliance. He then joined the National Socialist Freedom Movement, a front organization set up when the Nazi Party was outlawed in the wake of the Beer Hall Putsch.

== Nazi Party career ==
In April 1925, after the ban on the Nazi Party had been lifted, Schultz organized the Party in the Prussian Province of Hesse-Nassau and was made Gauleiter with his capital in Kassel. On 22 May 1925, he was formally enrolled in the Party (membership number 5,767). In September 1925, he became a member of the National Socialist Working Association, a short-lived group of northern and western German Gauleiter, organized and led by Gregor Strasser, which unsuccessfully sought to amend the Party program. It was dissolved in 1926 following the Bamberg Conference.

At the end of 1925, Schultz's large Gau was divided into two parts. He retained the leadership of Gau Hesse-Nassau North, while Gau Hesse-Nassau South went to Anton Haselmayer, based in Frankfurt. However, when Haselmayer resigned for health reasons on 22 September 1926, Schultz temporarily became acting Gauleiter in Hesse-Nassau South. This was very short-lived, as a new permanent replacement, Karl Linder, was appointed on 1 October. Almost a year later, on 1 September 1927, Schultz relinquished active leadership of Gau Hesse-Nassau North and was placed on leave due to the demands of his academic work. He formally stepped down on 1 February 1928 and was succeeded by his Deputy Gauleiter, Karl Weinrich.

In April 1929, Schultz was promoted to Oberstudienrat (senior teacher). Over the next few years, he was twice prosecuted for Nazi political activity. From November 1929 to March 1933, he was the municipal delegate to Landkreis Kassel. In March 1933, he was elected as a deputy to the Kreistag (district council) of Landkreis Kassel, and was named first district deputy. From October 1934 until April 1937, he sat on the Provinzialrat (provincial council) for the Province of Hesse-Nassau. In addition, Schultz served in an executive capacity as the Landrat (district administrator) in Landkreis Kassel from July 1934 to April 1937, and in Landkreis Eschwege from April 1937 to May 1945.

In addition to his government posts, Schultz remained active in the Party organization, becoming the leader of the Municipal Politics Office in Gau Kurhessen in 1933; additionally, from 1938 he worked in the Main Office for Municipal Political Affairs in the Party's Reichsleitung (National Leadership). He served in both these posts until the end of the Nazi regime in May 1945.

== Sources ==
- Höffkes, Karl (1986). Hitlers Politische Generale. Die Gauleiter des Dritten Reiches: ein biographisches Nachschlagewerk. Tübingen: Grabert-Verlag. ISBN 3-87847-163-7.
- Miller, Michael D.; Schulz, Andreas (2012). Gauleiter: The Regional Leaders of the Nazi Party and Their Deputies, 1925-1945. Vol. 1 (Herbert Albrecht - H. Wilhelm Hüttmann). R. James Bender Publishing. ISBN 978-1-932970-21-0.
- Miller, Michael D.; Schulz, Andreas (2021). Gauleiter: The Regional Leaders of the Nazi Party and Their Deputies. Vol. 3. Fonthill Media. ISBN 978-1-781-55826-3.
- Orlow, Dietrich (1969). The History of the Nazi Party: 1919-1933. University of Pittsburgh Press. ISBN 0-8229-3183-4.
