= Wiesbaden (region) =

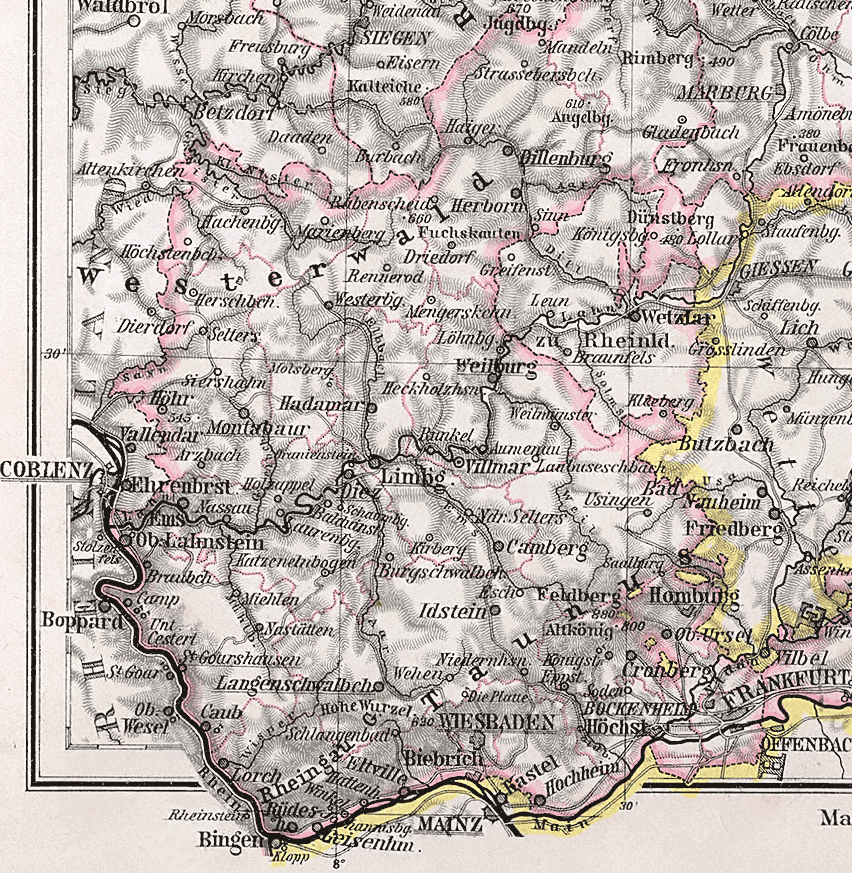
Regierungsbezirk Wiesbaden, 1905

The Wiesbaden Region (German: Regierungsbezirk Wiesbaden) was one of three administrative regions (along with Darmstadt Region and Kassel Region) from which the state of Hesse was formed in 1945.

== Regierungsbezirk (government region) ==
Following the Prussian annexations after the Austro-Prussian War of 1866, the administrative region of Wiesbaden was founded on February 22, 1867, comprising the formerly independent Duchy of Nassau, the Landgraviate of Hesse-Homburg and the formerly Free City of Frankfurt, previously states of the German Confederation. The Wiesbaden Region was one of the two political subdivisions (along with Kassel Region) within the province of Hesse-Nassau (the Prussian province formed in 1868 including, besides the Wiesbaden Region, further the former Electorate of Hesse, previously another member of the German Confederation).

In 1945 the northwestern part of region was dissected, when the Wiesbaden Region was divided between the American and the French zone of occupation in Germany. The bulk of region with the city of Wiesbaden continued to exist as a region within the new state of Hesse. The dissected northwest formed a new region, the Montabaur Region within Rhineland-Palatinate.

In 1968, the region was dissolved, and its territory was merged in the Darmstadt Region.

=== Region presidents (Regierungspräsidenten) ===
- 1867–1869 Gustav von Diest
- 1869–1872 Botho Graf zu Eulenberg
- 1872–1890 Lothar von Wurmb
- 1890–1897 Viktor von Tepper-Laski
- 1898–1902 Richard Wentzel
- 1902–1905 Wilhelm Hengstenberg
- 1905–1919 Karl Wilhelm von Meister
- 1919–1922 Willy Momm
- 1923–1925 Konrad Haenisch (SPD)
- 1925–1933 Fritz Ehrler (SPD)
- 1933–1936 Werner Zschintzsch (NSDAP)
- 1936–1943 Fritz Pfeffer von Salomon (NSDAP)
- 1943–1945 Otto Schwebel (NSDAP)
- 1945 (1 May - 3 August) Hans Bredow
- 1945–1948 Martin Nischalke (SPD)
- 1948–1956 Heinrich Noelle
- 1959–1963 Walter Schubert
- 1963–1968 Karl Wittrock (SPD)

== Bezirksverband (regional association) ==
Unlike other Prussian regions the Wiesbaden Region was not only an administrative entity of the Prussian government, but its pertaining counties formed a body, the Bezirksverband Nassau or Wiesbaden (about: regional association), with its own representative assembly (Nassauischer Kommunallandtag Wiesbaden, i.e. Nassau Communal Diet, existed between 1866 and 1933) and premises provided and tasks fulfilled for the entirety of the counties within the region. These tasks comprised among others schools, traffic installations, sanitary premises, hospitals, cultural institutions, jails etc. The same was the case in the Kassel Region with an own assembly (Kurhessischer Kommunallanddtag Kassel).

In most other Prussian provinces the tasks and rights of a Bezirksverband were fulfilled by the Provinzialverband (provincial association), comprising as members all the counties in a province instead of a region. The Nassau Communal Diet elected a regional government (first Verwaltungsausschuss, later Landesausschuss, i.e. administrative / land committee) presided over by the Landesdirektor (i.e. land director) or Landeshauptmann (i.e. land captain). On 8 June 1885 the Kommunalständischer Verband Frankfurt (i.e. Communal Estate Association of Frankfurt), holding the same responsibilities in the territory of the former Free City of Frankfurt upon Main, was merged into the regional association of Wiesbaden. The same reform enfranchised the Nassau Communal Diet to elect representatives for the newly established provincial diet of the Province of Hesse-Nassau, first convened in 1886.

In the course of the democratisation of the Prussian administration after 1918 the communal diets were directly elected by the people. After the abolition of the Nassau Communal Diet by the Nazi dictatorship each Landeshauptmann was appointed. After 1945 the administrative committees elected the Landeshauptmann, the regional parliament was not reestablished. In 1953 the Wiesbaden regional association was dissolved and its tasks and assets transferred to the new statewide State Welfare Association of Hesse (Landeswohlfahrtsverband Hessen).

=== Elections to the communal diets ===
Summary of the Nassau Communal Diet direct election results
| Parties | % 1921 | +/- 1921 | Seats 1921 | +/- 1921 | % 1925 | +/- 1925 | Seats 1925 | +/- 1925 | % 1929 | +/- 1929 | Seats 1929 | +/- 1929 | % 1933 | +/- 1933 | Seats 1933 | +/- 1933 |
|---|---|---|---|---|---|---|---|---|---|---|---|---|---|---|---|---|
| SPD | 29.9 | | 18 | | 30.6 | +0.7 (-4.6) | 16 | -2 (-5) | 26.2 | -4.4 | 14 | -2 | 17.8 | -8.4 | 10 | -4 |
| USPD | 5.3 | +5.3 | 3 | +3 | merged in SPD | +0.7 (-4.6) | 16 | -2 (-5) | 26.2 | -4.4 | 14 | -2 | 17.8 | -8.4 | 10 | -4 |
| Zentrum | 20.6 | | 12 | | 22.5 | +1.9 | 12 | -2 | 18.9 | -3.6 | 10 | -2 | 16.1 | -2.8 | 10 | 0 |
| DVP | 18.2 | +18.2 | 11 | +11 | 6.3 | -5.9 | 3 | -8 | 9.7 | +3.4 | 5 | +2 | | | 0 | -5 |
| DNVP | 10.8 | +10.8 | 7 | +7 | 5.4 | -5.4 | 3 | -4 | 5.2 | -0.2 | 3 | 0 | 6 | +0.8 | 4 | +1 |
| DDP | 9.7 | +9.7 | 7 | +7 | 5.9 | -3.8 | 4 | -3 | 4.5 | -1.4 | 3 | 0 | 1.7 | -2.8 | 0 | -3 |
| KPD | 3.4 | +3.4 | 2 | +2 | 6.4 | +3 | 4 | +2 | 8.21 | +1.81 | 5 | +1 | 7 | -1.21 | 4 | -1 |
| HNASL | not run | not run | not run | not run | 14.1 | +14.1 | 7 | +7 | | | 0 | -7 | | | 0 | 0 |
| WP | not run | not run | not run | not run | 7.8 | +7.8 | 3 | +3 | 5.1 | -2.7 | 3 | 0 | | | 0 | -3 |
| NSDAP | not run | not run | not run | not run | | | | | 8.19 | | 4 | +4 | 48.6 | +40,41 | 27 | +23 |
| CNBL | not run | not run | not run | not run | not run | not run | not run | not run | 8.4 | +8.4 | 5 | +5 | | | 0 | -5 |
| NaLa | | | 1 | +1 | | | 0 | -1 | | | 0 | 0 | | | 0 | 0 |
| Total 1921 | | | 61 | | Total 1925 | | 52 | | Total 1929 | | 52 | | Total 1933 | | 55 | |

=== Land director and land captains (Landesdirektor / Landeshauptmann) ===
- 1873–1881: Christian Wirth (1826–1895; Liberal Union), titled Landesdirektor
- 1881–1905: Otto Sartorius (1831–1911), titled Landeshauptmann
- 1905–1920: August Krekel (1847–1921), titled Landeshauptmann
- 1920–1926: Wilhelm Woell (1871–1926), titled Landeshauptmann
- 1926–1933: Wilhelm Lutsch (1879–), titled Landeshauptmann
- 1933–1944: Wilhelm Traupel (1891–1946; NSDAP), titled Landeshauptmann
- 1945: Ernst Ludwig Leyser (1896–1973; NSDAP), titled Landeshauptmann
- 1946–1953: Otto Witte (1884–1963; SPD), titled Landeshauptmann

== See also ==
- Wiesbaden
- Hesse-Nassau
- Greater Hesse
