= Anton Haselmayer =

German Nazi Party official (1895–1962)

Gauleiter of Gau Hesse-Nassau South
- In office December 1925 – 22 September 1926
- Preceded by: Position established
- Succeeded by: Walter Schultz

Personal details
- Born: 12 April 1895 Frankfurt am Main, Province of Hesse-Nassau, Kingdom of Prussia, German Empire
- Died: 22 January 1962 (aged 66)
- Party: Nazi Party (NSDAP)
- Profession: Lawyer

Anton Haselmayer (12 April 1895 – 22 January 1962) was a German journalist and an early member of the Nazi Party who served as the Gauleiter of Gau Hesse-Nassau South in 1925–1926, but was later dismissed and expelled from the Party. He became a lawyer, but his petitions for reinstatement were repeatedly denied and little is known of his subsequent life.

== Life ==
Haselmayer was born in Frankfurt am Main. After graduating from the local Gymnasium in 1914, he began studying law and then became a journalist. Haselmayer was an early adherent of the Nazi Party, joining it on 1 April 1925 (membership number 36) shortly after the lifting of the national ban that had been imposed on it in the wake of the failed Beer Hall Putsch.

At the end of 1925, when the large Gau of Hesse-Nassau was divided in two, Haselmayer was named the first Gauleiter for Gau Hesse-Nassau South, which comprised the People's State of Hesse and the southern section of the Prussian Province of Hesse-Nassau, with its capital at Frankfurt am Main.

In these early years of the Party's development when the ban on Adolf Hitler’s public speaking was still in effect, the Gauleiter served as the public face of the Party. Like all Gauleiter, Haselmayer was directly responsible to Hitler and was his personal representative to the Gau. As such, he wielded considerable power over all Party matters within his jurisdiction.

On 23 July 1926, Haselmayer was injured in an attempted assassination attempt in Frankfurt. On 28 July, Hitler wrote a letter to Haselmayer wishing him a speedy recovery and hoping that he would soon be well enough to exact revenge on the perpetrators. However, on 22 September 1926, Haselmayer resigned as Gauleiter, ostensibly "for health reasons", though the real reasons for his resignation were never entirely made clear. Furthermore, on 1 October 1928, he was expelled from the Nazi Party.

In 1930, Haselmayer's petition for reinstatement was denied. In March 1936, he obtained a law license and began working as an attorney in Munich. On 5 February 1937, his final petition for clemency and for readmission to the Party was denied. He was even accused of having staged the 1926 attack on himself as a way of improving his standing in the Party. The truth has never been definitively established. No additional details are known of Haselmayer's fate.

== Written works ==
- Der Fall Rosenbergs – und fällt Hitler mit? Eine Streitschrift zu "Der Fall Ludendorff" von Rosenberg. (English:The Rosenberg Case – and does it bring down Hitler too? A polemic on Rosenberg's "The Ludendorff Case") Munich, Ludendorffs Volkswarte Verlag (1932).
- Der Kampf um den Kirchenaustritt: Das Kirchenaustrittsrecht (English: The Fight for Leaving the Church: The Right to Leave the Church) Munich, Ludendorffs Volkswarte Verlag (1933).

== Sources ==
- Höffkes, Karl (1986). Hitlers Politische Generale. Die Gauleiter des Dritten Reiches: ein biographisches Nachschlagewerk. Tübingen: Grabert-Verlag. ISBN 3-87847-163-7.
- Miller, Michael D.; Schulz, Andreas (2012). Gauleiter: The Regional Leaders of the Nazi Party and Their Deputies, 1925–1945. Vol. 1 (Herbert Albrecht – H. Wilhelm Hüttmann). R. James Bender Publishing. ISBN 978-1-932-97021-0.
- Miller, Michael D.; Schulz, Andreas (2021). Gauleiter: The Regional Leaders of the Nazi Party and Their Deputies, 1925–1945. Vol. 3 (Fritz Sauckel – Hans Zimmermann). Fonthill Media. ISBN 978-1-781-55826-3.
- Orlow, Dietrich (1969). The History of the Nazi Party: 1919–1933. University of Pittsburgh Press. ISBN 0-8229-3183-4.
