= Province of Nassau =

Province of Prussia

Province of Nassau Provinz Nassau (German)
- Province of Prussia
- 1944–1945
- Flag Coat of arms

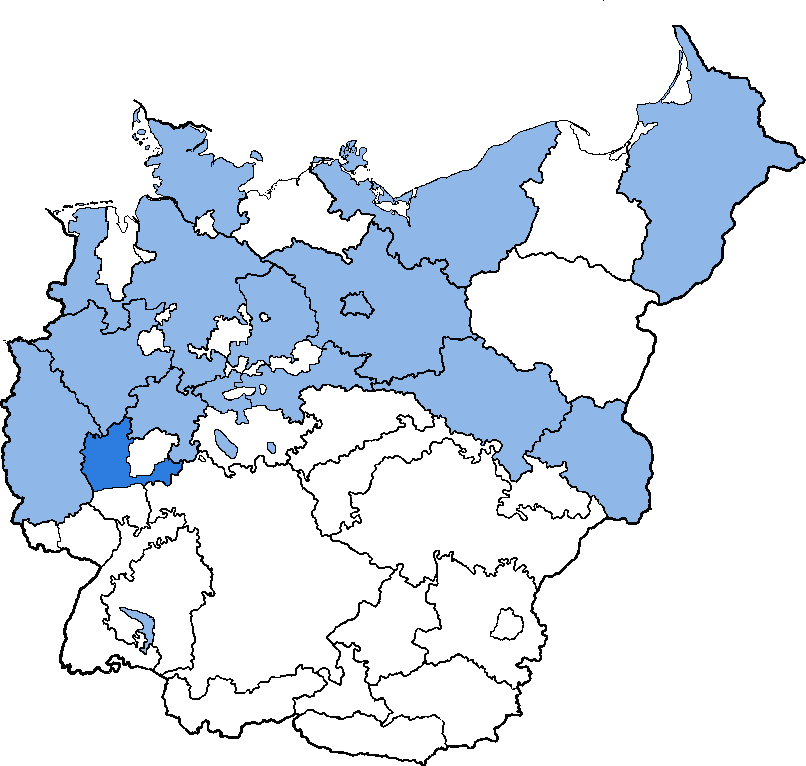
- The Province of Nassau in 1944.
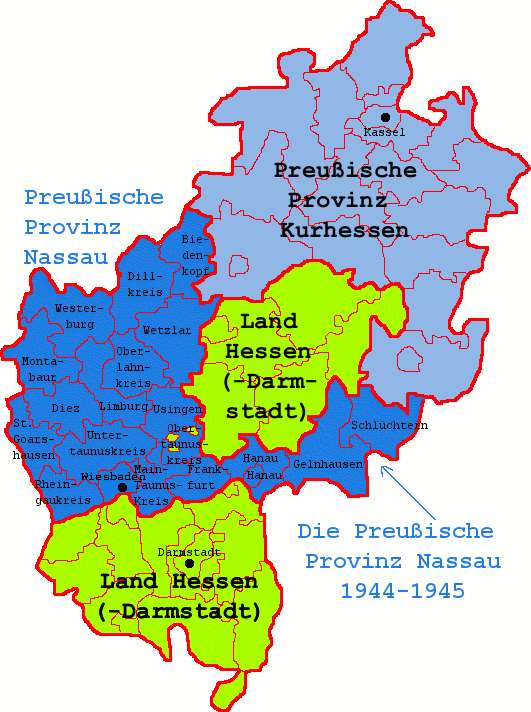
- Capital: Wiesbaden
- Area
  - 1944: 7,366.034 km^{2} (2,844.042 sq mi)
- Population
  - 1944: 1,670,000
- Government
  - Type: Province
- High President
  - 1944–1945: Jakob Sprenger
- Historical era: World War II
  - Established: 1 July 1944
  - Disestablished: 19 September 1945
Preceded by	Succeeded by
Province of Hesse-Nassau	Greater Hesse; Rhineland-Palatinate

The Province of Nassau (German: Provinz Nassau) was a province of Prussia from 1944 to 1945.

== Creation ==
Although the German states (including Prussia) had lost their sovereignty to the Reich in 1934, the Prussian provinces continued to exist as administrative units. The Nazi government partitioned the Prussian Province of Hesse-Nassau by a decree issued on 1 April 1944 and effective on 1 July 1944. The Kassel government region became the Province of Kurhessen and the Wiesbaden government region became the Province of Nassau, with the stated aim of bringing the administrative districts into line with the Reich defence districts. At the same time the city and district of Hanau and the districts of Gelnhausen and Schlüchtern were transferred from Kurhessen to Nassau, and the district of Schmalkalden to the Erfurt government region. The decree assigned Schmalkalden to the Province of Saxony, but that province was split up on the same day; the Erfurt region was not made a province of its own and was instead placed under the Reichsstatthalter in Thuringia.

Districts affected by the 1944 partition of the Province of Hesse-Nassau
State	Before (to 30 June 1944)				After (from 1 July 1944)		
State	Province	Region	District	Gau	Province	Region	Gau
Prussia	Hesse-Nassau	Wiesbaden	All districts	Hesse-Nassau	Nassau	Wiesbaden	Hesse-Nassau
Prussia	Hesse-Nassau	Kassel	Hanau (city)	Hesse-Nassau	Nassau	Wiesbaden	Hesse-Nassau
Prussia	Hesse-Nassau	Kassel	Hanau (district)	Hesse-Nassau	Nassau	Wiesbaden	Hesse-Nassau
Prussia	Hesse-Nassau	Kassel	Gelnhausen	Hesse-Nassau	Nassau	Wiesbaden	Hesse-Nassau
Prussia	Hesse-Nassau	Kassel	Schlüchtern	Hesse-Nassau	Nassau	Wiesbaden	Hesse-Nassau
Prussia	Hesse-Nassau	Kassel	All other districts	Kurhessen	Kurhessen	Kassel	Kurhessen
Prussia	Hesse-Nassau	Kassel	Herrschaft Schmalkalden	Thuringia	Saxony (Note: On paper only. The decree moved Schmalkalden into the Erfurt region of the Province of Saxony, but that province was split up on the same day, 1 July 1944. Its Magdeburg and Merseburg regions became provinces of their own; the Erfurt region did not, and was instead run by the Reichsstatthalter in Thuringia, who was also Gauleiter of Thuringia.)	Erfurt	Thuringia
Prussia	Saxony	Erfurt	All districts	Thuringia	Saxony	Erfurt	Thuringia

The new province consisted of the Prussian part of the Nazi Party's Gau Hesse-Nassau. The Gau also included the People's State of Hesse, the former Grand Duchy of Hesse. Its Gauleiter, Jakob Sprenger, had also been the Reichsstatthalter in Hesse since 1933 and Reich Defense Commissioner for Wehrkreis XII since 1939. In November 1942, the Reich defence districts were redrawn to match the party Gaue, and from then on every Gauleiter was Reich Defense Commissioner for his own Gau.

The government of the Prussian part of his Gau—Hesse-Nassau's Wiesbaden region—roughly the former Duchy of Nassau, plus Frankfurt am Main, Hesse-Homburg, Wetzlar,Hanau, Gelnhausen and Schlüchtern—long remained outside his control, and there he had to work with the Prussian state authorities. His appointment as Oberpräsident of the new Province of Nassau in July 1944 ended that limitation, and united party and state authority in his hands across the whole Gau.

== Name ==
The name comes from the former Duchy of Nassau (1806–1866), which Prussia annexed following the Austro-Prussian War to form part of the province of Hesse-Nassau. The territory of the province was larger than that of the former duchy, encompassing those areas of the NSDAP Gau Hesse-Nassau not part of the People's State of Hesse.

== Dissolution ==
Following the end of World War II, most of the province of Nassau fell under American administration. The province of Nassau was dissolved by the occupying US forces on 19 September 1945, forming part of the administrative zone of Greater Hesse along with Kurhessen and the American parts of the People's State of Hesse. Just over a year later, Greater Hesse became the modern German state of Hesse. A small western part of the province of Nassau instead fell under French control; it became the Regierungsbezirk Montabaur of the modern state of Rhineland-Palatinate on 30 August 1946.
