= Waldeck state elections in the Weimar Republic =

German state elections

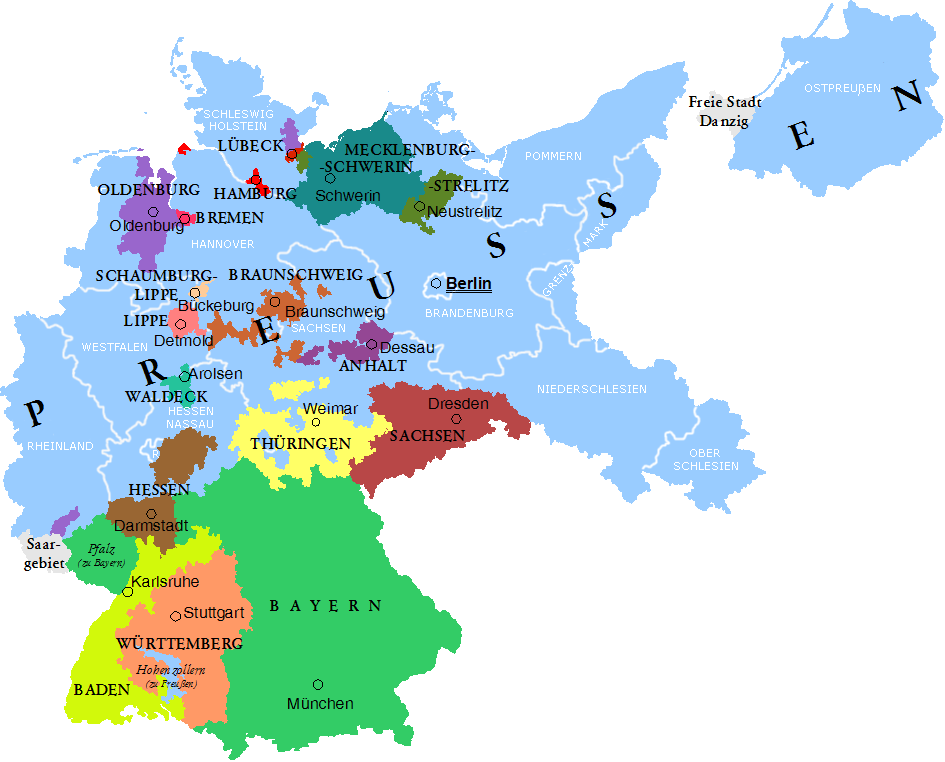
Waldeck in the Weimar Republic. At the center-left in light green.

State elections in the Free State of Waldeck (prior to December 1921, the Free State of Waldeck-Pyrmont) during the Weimar Republic were held at 3-year intervals between 1919 and 1925. Results with regard to the total vote, the percentage of the vote won and the number of seats allocated to each party are presented in the tables below. Pyrmont, in accordance with the results of a plebiscite, was detached from Waldeck and incorporated into the Free State of Prussia on 30 November 1921. Following a second plebiscite, Waldeck itself also subsequently merged with Prussia on 1 May 1929.

== 1919 ==
The 1919 Waldeck-Pyrmont state election was held on 9 March 1919 to elect 21 Constituent Landesvertreter (State Representatives).

1919 Waldeck-Pyrmont state election
Party	Votes	%	Seats
Social Democratic Party of Germany	8,196	30.40	7
German National People's Party	6,265	23.24	6
German Democratic Party	5,718	21.21	4
Waldeck People's Federation	3,654	13.55	3
German People's Party	1,919	7.12	1
Centre Party	769	2.85	0
Other	436	1.62	0
Total	26,957	100.00	21
Valid votes	26,957	100.00	
Invalid/blank votes	0	0.00	
Total votes	26,957	100.00	
Registered voters/turnout	34,000	79.29	

== 1922 ==
The 1922 Waldeck state election was held on 21 May 1922 to elect the 17 Landesvertreter (State Representatives).

1922 Waldeck-Pyrmont state election
Party	Votes	%	Seats	+/–
Waldeck State Electoral Association (DNVP, DVP, LB & Craftsmens Federation)	9,064	50.15	9	New
Social Democratic Party of Germany	3,774	20.88	4	–3
German Democratic Party	2,338	12.93	2	–2
Waldeck Union	1,571	8.69	1	New
Independent Social Democratic Party	1,328	7.35	1	New
Total	18,075	100.00	17	–4
Valid votes	18,075	99.81		
Invalid/blank votes	35	0.19		
Total votes	18,110	100.00		
Registered voters/turnout	32,419	55.86		

== 1925 ==
The 1925 Waldeck state election was held on 17 May 1925 to elect the 17 Landesvertreter (State Representatives).

1925 Waldeck-Pyrmont state election
Party	Votes	%	Seats	+/–
Agricultural League	5,158	33.47	7	New
Social Democratic Party of Germany	2,866	18.60	3	–1
German National People's Party	2,488	16.14	3	New
Craftsmens Federation	1,870	12.13	2	New
Middleclass Federation (German People's Party)	1,473	9.56	1	New
German Democratic Party	1,027	6.66	1	–1
Wirtschaftsbund (Economic Federation)	529	3.43	0	New
Total	15,411	100.00	17	0
Valid votes	15,411	99.39		
Invalid/blank votes	94	0.61		
Total votes	15,505	100.00		
Registered voters/turnout	34,492	44.95		
