= Karl Gerland =

Nazi Party official (1905–1945)

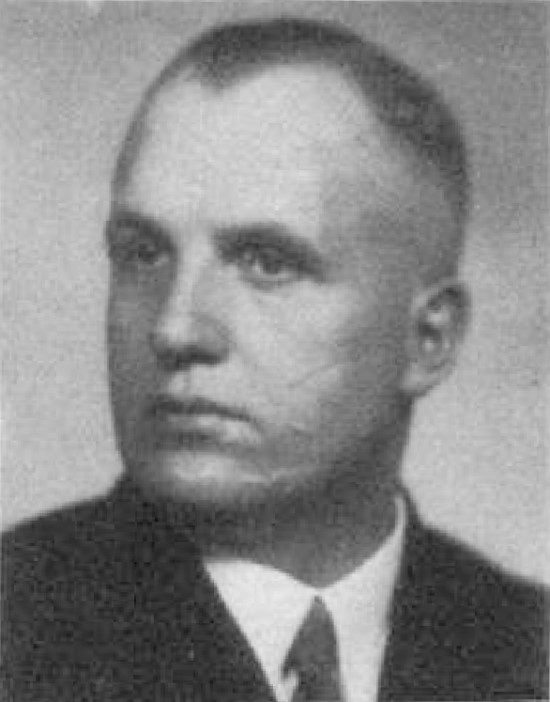

Gauleiter Gau Kurhessen
- In office 6 November 1943 – 21 April 1945
- Preceded by: Karl Weinrich
- Succeeded by: Position abolished

Oberpräsident Province of Kurhessen
- In office 1 July 1944 – 10 April 1945
- Preceded by: Position created
- Succeeded by: Fritz Hoch

Deputy Gauleiter Reichsgau Lower Danube
- In office 1 June 1938 – 6 November 1943
- Preceded by: Position created
- Succeeded by: Position unfilled

Personal details
- Born: 14 July 1905 Gottsbüren, Province of Hesse-Nassau, Kingdom of Prussia, German Empire
- Died: 21 April 1945 (aged 39) Frankfurt (Oder), Nazi Germany
- Party: Nazi Party (NSDAP)
- Profession: Mechanical engineer
- Awards: Golden Party Badge

Military service
- Allegiance: Nazi Germany
- Branch/service: German Army
- Years of service: 1940
- Rank: Unteroffizier
- Battles/wars: World War II

Karl Gerland (14 July 1905 – 21 April 1945) was a Nazi Gauleiter of Gau Kurhessen and Oberpräsident of the Prussian Province of Kurhessen. On 21 April 1945, Gerland was killed in action against the Soviet Red Army at Frankfurt (Oder).

== Early years ==
Gerland was born in Gottsbüren (now a part of Trendelburg) near Kassel. He graduated from the gymnasium in Kassel in 1923 and then was employed as a mechanical engineer by the German National Railway. He pursued additional training in engineering at the University of Hanover until 1928 and then worked in various commercial and technical businesses.

== Nazi career ==
Gerland joined the Nazi Party in December 1929 and became Kreisleiter (County Leader) in Kreis Hofgeismar from September 1930 to January 1932. From January to July 1932, he was Beziksleiter (District Leader) in Fulda-Gersfeld-Hünfeld and Deputy Propaganda Leader of Gau Hesse-Nassau North. In July 1932, he advanced to Gau Propaganda Leader. After the Nazi seizure of power, he became head of the provincial office of the Reich Ministry of Propaganda from May to November 1934. He then worked as a department head in the office of Deputy Führer Rudolf Hess in the Party Reichsleitung (National Leadership) in Munich from November 1934 to November 1938. In March 1936, Gerland was elected to the Reichstag from electoral constituency 8, (Liegnitz), a seat he retained until his death. On 30 January 1938, he was awarded the Golden Party Badge. Gerland joined the SS on 16 March 1938 with the rank of Hauptsturmführer. From 1 June 1938 until 6 November 1943, he was Deputy Gauleiter in Reichsgau Lower Danube.

== The war years ==
From May to September 1940, Gerland saw military service as an Unteroffizier of Reserves, and was wounded in the battle of France. On 9 November 1940, he was promoted to SS-Oberführer and assigned to the staff of the Reichsführer-SS. In November 1943, Gerland was promoted to SS-Brigadeführer and, on 6 November, he was appointed Gauleiter and Reich Defense Commissioner in Gau Kurhessen. He succeeded Karl Weinrich, who had been removed from these posts for abandoning the city of Kassel during an air raid on 22 October. Gerland served as acting Gauleiter from 6 November 1943 until being named permanent on 13 December 1944. From 1 July 1944, Gerland was also Oberpräsident (High President) of the newly formed Prussian Province of Kurhessen, which formerly had been part of the Province of Hesse-Nassau. Gerland thus united under his control the highest party and governmental offices in the province. On 1 August 1944, Gerland was promoted to SS-Gruppenführer.

In the spring of 1945, with the American Army invading his Gau, he received high praise from Joseph Goebbels. In his diary entry of 2 April 1945, Goebbels noted that Gerland was conducting himself "superbly," adding, "I would have expected this from [him] anyway." When his capital, Kassel, fell to American forces on 4 April 1945, Gerland fled eastward and joined German forces fighting in Brandenburg. On 21 April, Gerland was killed near Frankfurt (Oder) during fighting on the Eastern Front.

== Sources ==
- Höffkes, Karl (1986). Hitlers Politische Generale. Die Gauleiter des Dritten Reiches: ein biographisches Nachschlagewerk. Tübingen: Grabert-Verlag. ISBN 3-87847-163-7.
- Miller, Michael D.; Schulz, Andreas (2012). Gauleiter: The Regional Leaders of the Nazi Party and Their Deputies, 1925-1945. Vol. I (Herbert Albrecht – H. Wilhelm Huttmann). R. James Bender Publishing. ISBN 978-1-932970-21-0.
- Trevor-Roper, Hugh, ed. (1978). Final Entries, 1945: The Diaries of Joseph Goebbels. New York: Avon Books. ISBN 0-380-42408-8.

== External website ==
- Information about Karl Gerland in the Reichstag database
