= Gau Electoral Hesse =

Administrative division in Nazi Germany (1933–1945)

- Gau of Nazi Germany
- 1925–1945
- Flag Coat of arms

- Capital: Kassel
- Government
- Gauleiter
  - 1925–1928: Walter Schultz
  - 1928–1943: Karl Weinrich
  - 1943–1944: Karl Gerland (acting)
  - 1944–1945: Karl Gerland
- History
  - Establishment: December 1925
  - Disestablishment: 8 May 1945
Preceded by	Succeeded by
Hesse-Nassau	Greater Hesse
- Today part of: Germany

The Gau Electoral Hesse (German: Gau Kurhessen) was an administrative division of Nazi Germany from 1933 to 1945, initially known under the name Gau Hesse-Nassau-North (German: Gau Hessen-Nassau-Nord), comprising the northern part of the Prussian province of Hesse-Nassau. Before that, from 1925 to 1933, it was the regional subdivision of the Nazi Party in that area.

== History ==
The Nazi Gau (plural Gaue) system was originally established in a party conference on 22 May 1926, in order to improve administration of the party structure. From 1933 onwards, after the Nazi seizure of power, the Gaue increasingly replaced the German states as administrative subdivisions in Germany. The Gau was originally part of the Gau Hesse-Nassau which was split into Gau Hesse-Nassau-North and Gau Hesse-Nassau-South at the end of 1925. In 1934 the Gau Hesse-Nassau-North was reorganised and renamed Gau Electoral Hesse.

At the head of each Gau stood a Gauleiter, a position which became increasingly more powerful, especially after the outbreak of the Second World War, with little interference from above. Local Gauleiters often held government positions as well as party ones and were in charge of, among other things, propaganda and surveillance and, from September 1944 onward, the Volkssturm and the defense of the Gau.

The position of Gauleiter was originally held by Walter Schultz from 1925 to 1928, followed by Karl Weinrich from 1928 to 1943. Karl Gerland succeeded Weinrich, initially in an acting position before becoming permanent Gauleiter in 1944. Gerland was killed in action in April 1945. Weinrich, his predecessor who was removed from his position because of incompetence during a bombing raid on Kassel, survived the war, was sentenced to a ten-year prison term in 1949 and died in 1973.

== See also ==
- Gauliga Hessen, the highest association football league in the Gau from 1933 to 1945
