= Free State of Waldeck-Pyrmont =

Constituent state of Weimar Germany

Free State of Waldeck-Pyrmont (1918–21) Freistaat Waldeck-Pyrmont Free State of Waldeck (1921–29) Freistaat Waldeck
- State of the Weimar Republic
- 1918–1929
- Flag

- The Free State of Waldeck (red) within the Weimar Republic (after Pyrmont became part of Prussia in 1921)
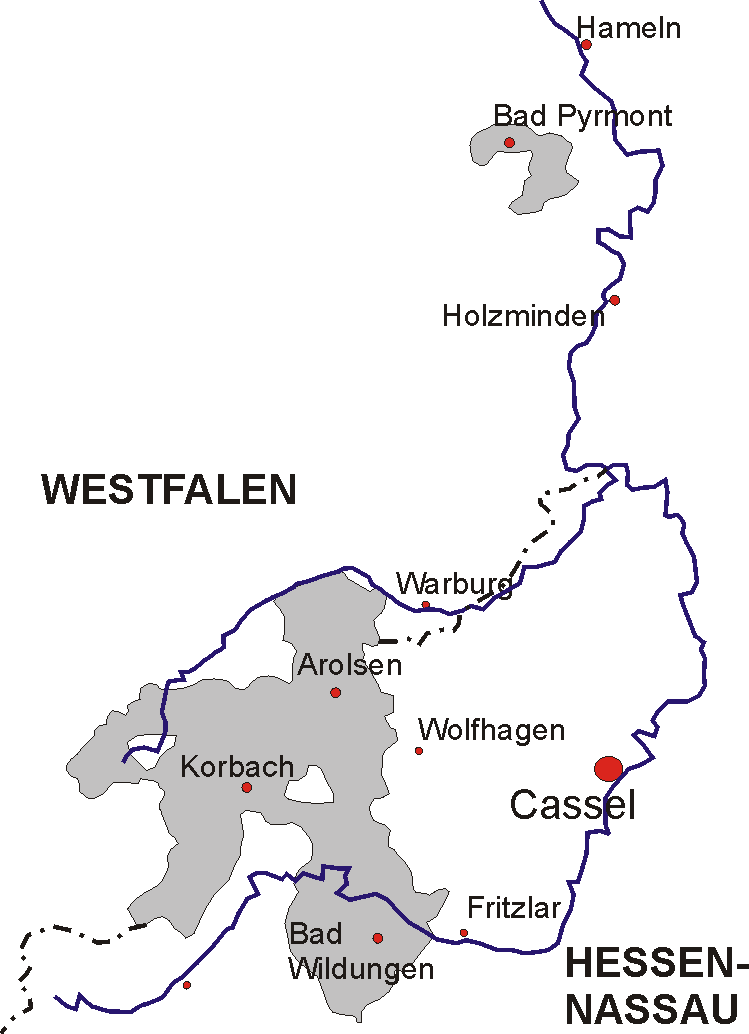
- Waldeck (southern gray area) and Pyrmont (in the north)

Anthem
- Mein Waldeck
- Capital: Arolsen
- Area
  - Coordinates: 51°22′00″N 9°01′00″E
- Population
  - 1925: 55,750
  - Type: Republic
- Historical era: Interwar period
  - German Revolution: 1918
  - Pyrmont joins Hanover: 1921
  - Merges with Prussian province of Hesse-Nassau: 1929
Preceded by
Principality of Waldeck and Pyrmont
Succeeded by
Free State of Prussia
Province of Hanover
Province of Hesse-Nassau

The Free State of Waldeck-Pyrmont (German: Freistaat Waldeck-Pyrmont; 1918–1921), later the Free State of Waldeck (Freistaat Waldeck; 1921–1929), was a constituent state of the Weimar Republic. It was created from the Principality of Waldeck and Pyrmont during the German revolution of 1918–1919, which led to the abdications of Prince Friedrich and all of the other German monarchs.

On 30 November 1921, Pyrmont was incorporated into the Prussian province of Hanover. The remainder of the state became part of the Prussian province of Hesse-Nassau on 1 May 1929. The territory is today part of the Waldeck-Frankenberg district of Hesse.

== History ==
=== Principality of Waldeck and Pyrmont ===
The Principality of Waldeck and Pyrmont, in existence since 1180, was a member state of the German Confederation (1815–1866), the North German Confederation (1866–1871) and the German Empire (1871–1918). In 1867, the parliament of Waldeck and Pyrmont unanimously rejected the proposed constitution of the North German Confederation in the belief that the Principality would not be able to bear the costs associated with joining. Prince George Victor was forced to make a treaty of accession with the Kingdom of Prussia, and on 1 January 1868 it took over Waldeck and Pyrmont's administration, including its justice and education systems. Prussia found it necessary to provide the Principality with ever-increasing subsidies, to the point that it became a de facto protectorate of Prussia. The arrangement remained in place throughout the remaining existence of both Pyrmont and Waldeck.

=== German revolution ===
The German revolution, which broke out in late October 1918 as World War I drew to a close, reached Waldeck and Pyrmont in the first weeks of November. Representatives of the workers' and soldiers' council from nearby Kassel, which was similar to many that were taking control in cities and towns across Germany, came to Arolsen on 11 November and attempted to force the abdication of Prince Friedrich. The workers' and soldiers' council that formed in Arolsen the following day declared the Prince deposed on the 14th and assumed control of the government.

On 9 March 1919, a constituent assembly was elected to draft a constitution for the new Free State of Waldeck-Pyrmont. None was developed, however, and the constitution of 1849/1852 remained in place, making Waldeck-Pyrmont the only state in the Weimar Republic without a republican constitution. Its head of government was a state director (Landesdirektor) appointed by the Prussian state ministry. It also had a freely elected 17-member state parliament (Landesvertretung).

=== Incorporation into Prussia ===
In a non-binding referendum held in Pyrmont in 1921, 80% of the voters chose to become part of the Free State of Prussia. On 29 November 1921, representatives of Waldeck-Pyrmont and Prussia signed an agreement to make Pyrmont part of the new Hameln-Pyrmont district of the Prussian Province of Hanover. The annexation went into effect on 1 April 1922.

The remaining territory continued to be governed according to the 1867 treaty with Prussia until it was cancelled in 1926. On 9 April 1927, Germany's federal Financial Equalisation Act (Finanzausgleichsgesetz) was amended in a way that made Waldeck's financial situation untenable. The question of joining Prussia was the subject of considerable controversy in Waldeck. All parties in the state parliament saw the move as necessary, but the majority of the population opposed it. The agreement between Prussia and Waldeck was signed on 23 March 1928 and went into effect on 1 May 1929. Waldeck became part of the Province of Hesse-Nassau, marking the end of Waldeck's existence as a sovereign state.

== State directors ==
State directors were appointed by the Prussian state ministry.

- 1918–1920 Wilhelm von Redern
- 1920–1929 Wilhelm Schmieding (German People's Party)
- 1929 Herbert Herberg

== See also ==
- Waldeck state elections in the Weimar Republic
