= American occupation zone in Germany =

Allied-occupied area in Germany (1945–1949)

American occupation zone in Germany Amerikanische Besatzungszone
- Military occupation zone of the American part of Allied-occupied Germany
- 1945–1949
- Flag of the United States

- American occupation zone (orange)

Anthem
- "The Star-Spangled Banner"
- Capital: Frankfurt
- Government
  - Type: Military Occupation
- Military governors
  - 1945 (first): Dwight D. Eisenhower
  - 1949 (last): Clarence R. Huebner
- Historical era: Post-World War II; Cold War
  - Surrender of Nazi Germany: May 8, 1945
  - Federal Republic of Germany established: May 23, 1949
Preceded by	Succeeded by
Nazi Germany	West Germany
- Today part of: Germany

The American occupation zone in Germany (German: Amerikanische Besatzungszone), also known as the US-Zone, and the Southwest zone, was one of the four occupation zones established by the Allies of World War II in Germany west of the Oder–Neisse line in July 1945, around two months after the German surrender and the end of World War II in Europe. It was controlled by the Office of Military Government, United States (OMGUS) and ceased to exist after the establishment of the Federal Republic of Germany on 21 September 1949 (FRG established 23 May 1949). However, even as of 2026, the United States still maintains some military presence across Germany.

== Geography ==
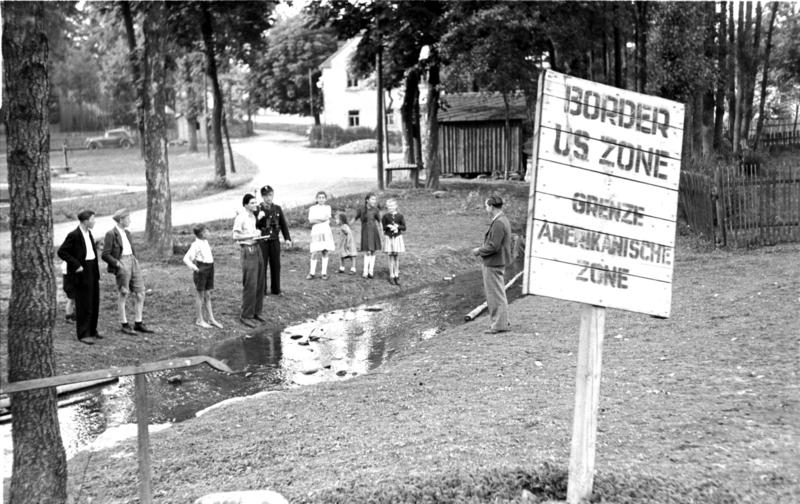
Border of the American zone at Tannbach in Mödlareuth, between Thuringia and Bavaria, in 1949.

The American zone of occupation was more than 40,000 square miles (100,000 km^{2}) or about the size of the state of Pennsylvania, with almost 1,400 miles (2,300 km) of internal and international boundaries. The largest cities were Frankfurt and Munich. The zone encompassed a large section of south-eastern and central Germany:

- Bavaria (including the Thuringian exclave of Ostheim, but excluding Lindau and the Palatinate)
- The Prussian provinces of Kurhessen and Nassau (excluding the various exclaves belonging to them and the districts of Oberwesterwald, Unterwesterwald, Unterlahn, and Sankt Goarshausen)
- The portions of the People's State of Hesse east of the Rhine river (Starkenburg, Upper Hesse, and the parts of Rhenish Hesse east of the river) which became the state of Greater Hesse.
- The portions of Württemberg and the Republic of Baden north of the Karlsruhe-Ulm Reichsautobahn (now the A 8), which were combined to become the state of Württemberg-Baden.

In addition, Bremen and Bremerhaven (including the districts of Wesermünde, Osterholz und Wesermarsch until December 1945) were part of the zone and played a central role as the port through which the occupation zone was supplied.

More than 16 million Germans and more than one half million displaced persons lived in the zone. At the end of October 1946, the American Zone had a population of:

- Bavaria 8.7 million
- Hesse 3.97 million
- Württemberg-Baden 3.6 million
- Bremen 0.48 million

Berlin was divided in four between the four occupying powers. The southwestern portion (consisting of the boroughs of Neukölln, Kreuzberg, Schöneberg, Steglitz, Tempelhof, and Zehlendorf) was the American sector and came under US military administration, but was formally separate from the American occupation zone.

Under the Wanfried agreement on 17 September 1945, some villages on the Werra river were exchanged for some villages in the Soviet Occupation Zone, in order to place the whole of the Frankfurt–Göttingen railway under American control. This also brought part of Eichsfeld into the zone.

== Military government ==
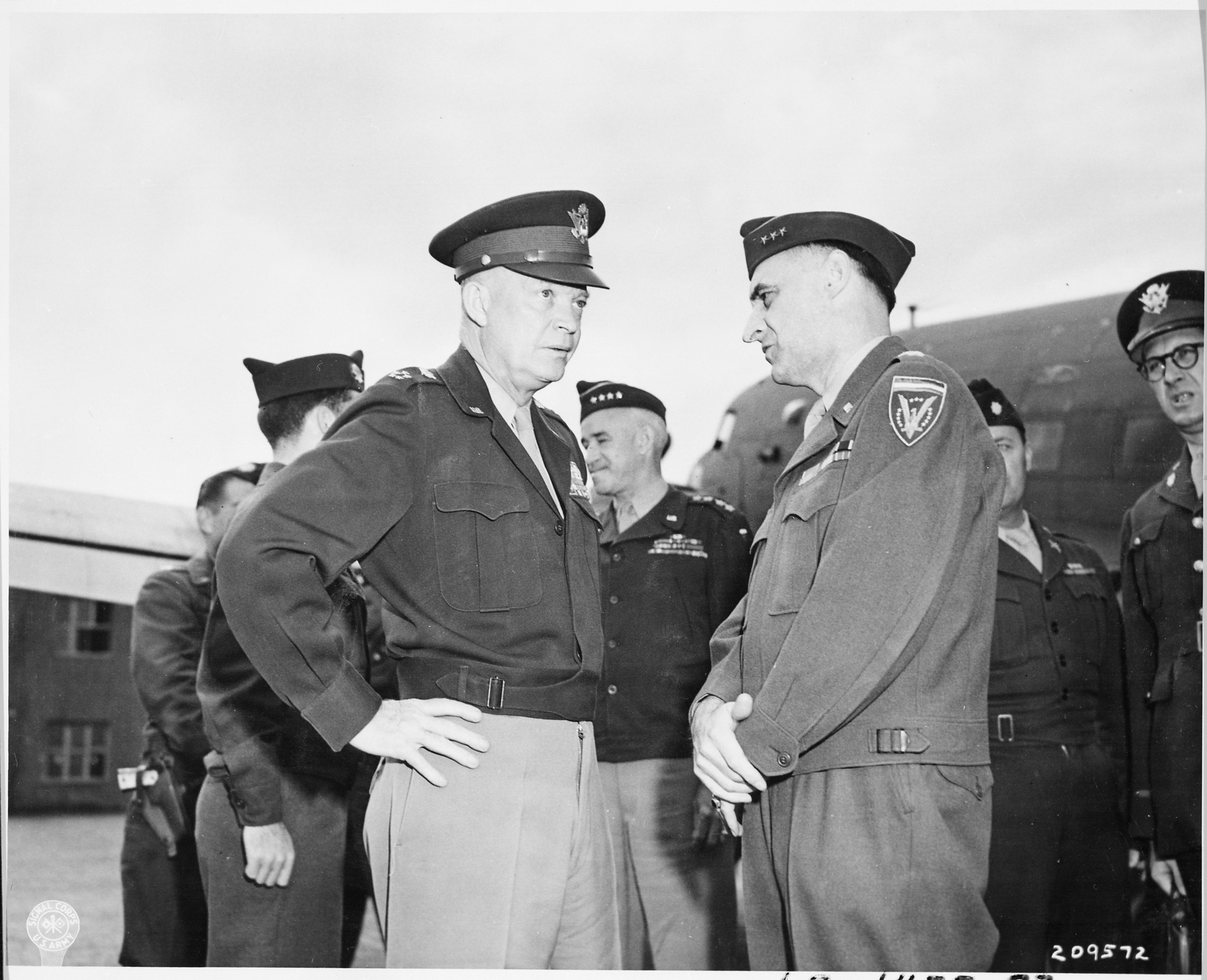
Dwight D. Eisenhower and Lucius D. Clay in Berlin in 1945

The headquarters of the OMGUS was the former IG Farben Building in Frankfurt. Command of the OMGUS was initially invested in Dwight Eisenhower, who was commander-in-chief of the American forces in Europe at the end of World War II.

Eisenhower's successors were:

- George S. Patton (November 1945, acting)
- Joseph T. McNarney (November 1945–January 1947)
- Lucius D. Clay (January 1947–May 1949)
- Clarence R. Huebner (May–September 1949, acting)

The four Allied powers coordinated the occupation of Germany through the Allied Control Council, which ceased to operate after the Soviets withdrew from it on 20 March 1948. In 1949, the military administration of the American, British, and French zones was succeeded by the Allied High Commission, which remained in operation until 1955.

The United States Constabulary provided security, with soldiers in other fields retraining as military police. The military occupation of the American sector of West Berlin continued until 2 October 1990.

== Political organization ==
Under "Proclamation no. 2" of 19 September 1945, they announced the intention to organise the territory on a federal model. Between 1945 and 1946, the Americans established four states in their zone: Bavaria, Bremen, Greater Hesse, and Württemberg-Baden, which worked together in the State Council of the American occupation zone (Länderrat). Württemberg-Baden subsequently merged with the states of Baden and Württemberg-Hohenzollern in the French occupation zone to form Baden-Württemberg in 1952.

On 5 March 1946, the "Law for Liberation from National Socialism and Militarism" (German: Befreiungsgesetz) came into force in the American zone, providing the model for Denazification throughout the Western zones: all Germans over 18 years of age were required to complete a questionnaire giving an account of their role in Nazi Germany.

In January 1946 elections were held for local councils in 10,429 towns smaller than 20,000 people. Nazis were disqualified from voting or running for office. An unexpectedly high 86% of eligible voters participated. CSU received the most votes in Bavaria, CDU in Württemberg-Baden, and SPD in Greater Hesse. While OMGUS observers were dubious of the German people having suddenly wholeheartedly embraced democracy, they were pleased that the elections gave some legitimacy to local governments that until then the American occupation had appointed. Landkreis and Stadtkreis elections were held on 28 April and 26 May 1946; while OMGUS remained skeptical of genuine democratic inclination, American Landkreis and Stadtkreis detachments became liaison and security forces.

The first state Constituent Assembly elections (except in Bremen) were held on 30 June 1946. In Bavaria, CSU won a majority; in Württemberg-Baden, CDU won a plurality, whilst in Greater Hesse, SPD won a plurality. In Bremen, the first elections were held on 13 October 1946, resulting in a SPD majority, but Wilhelm Kaisen still chose to form a coalition with KPD and Bremen's Democratic People's Party (Bremer Demokratische Volkspartei, BDV), a precursor of FDP. Following the passage of state constitutions, new elections were held in Württemberg-Baden on 24 November, resulting in Reinhold Maier (DVP) continuing the all-party (CDU, SPD, DVP, KPD) government, and on 1 December in Bavaria, where CSU won a majority, but Hans Ehard still formed a grand coalition with SPD and WAV, before leading a one-party government from 20 September 1947; and in Hesse, where SPD won a plurality and Christian Stock (SPD) formed a grand coalition with CDU. On 12 October 1947, Bremen held another election, where SPD came four seats short of a majority and thus formed a coalition with BDV, with Kaisen continuing in office.

On 1 January 1947, the American and British occupation zones were combined to form the Bizone. This became the Trizone after the French occupation zone joined on 1 August 1948 and became the Federal Republic of Germany ("West Germany") on 23 May 1949 with the passage of the Basic Law.

== Media ==
Following the complete closure of all Nazi German media, the launch and operation of completely new newspaper titles began by licensing carefully selected Germans as publishers. Licenses were only granted to Germans not involved in Nazi propaganda to establish those newspapers, including Frankfurter Rundschau, Der Tagesspiegel, and Süddeutsche Zeitung.

Radio stations were run by the military government via the Information Control Division Unlike the French and British zones, which each established a single channel (SWF and NWDR respectively), the Americans established several broadcasters, in line with the system of local radio broadcasters in the United States: Bayerischer Rundfunk (BR, initially Radio München), Radio Bremen, Hessischer Rundfunk (HR, initially Radio Frankfurt), and Süddeutscher Rundfunk (SDR, initially Radio Stuttgart). The radio station Rundfunk im amerikanischen Sektor ("Radio in the American Sector" or RIAS) was established and run by the military government, and remained under U.S. control for the duration of the Cold War.

== Transport ==
From 22 September 1945, there were three long-distance train services operating in the American occupation zone, for the first time since the end of the war. All three routes travelled from Frankfurt am Main and were third class only:

- D 57 / D 58 Frankfurt (Main) Ost through Nuremberg Central to Munich Central (ca. 11 hours)
- D 369 / D 370 Frankfurt (Main) Süd through Kornwestheim to Munich Central (ca. 10.5 hours)
- D 115 / D 116 Frankfurt (Main) Ost–Hof Central (ca. 10 hours)

== Archives ==
The original documents of the OMGUS are kept in the Washington National Records Center (held by the University of Maryland). The documents from Hesse were recorded on microfiche in the late 1970s/early 1980s, which are now accessible in all three Hessian State Archives (Hessian Central State Archives in Wiesbaden, Hessian State Archives in Marburg und Hessian State Archives in Darmstadt). The Hessian State Archives in Darmstadt have made the details of all these microfiches available online.

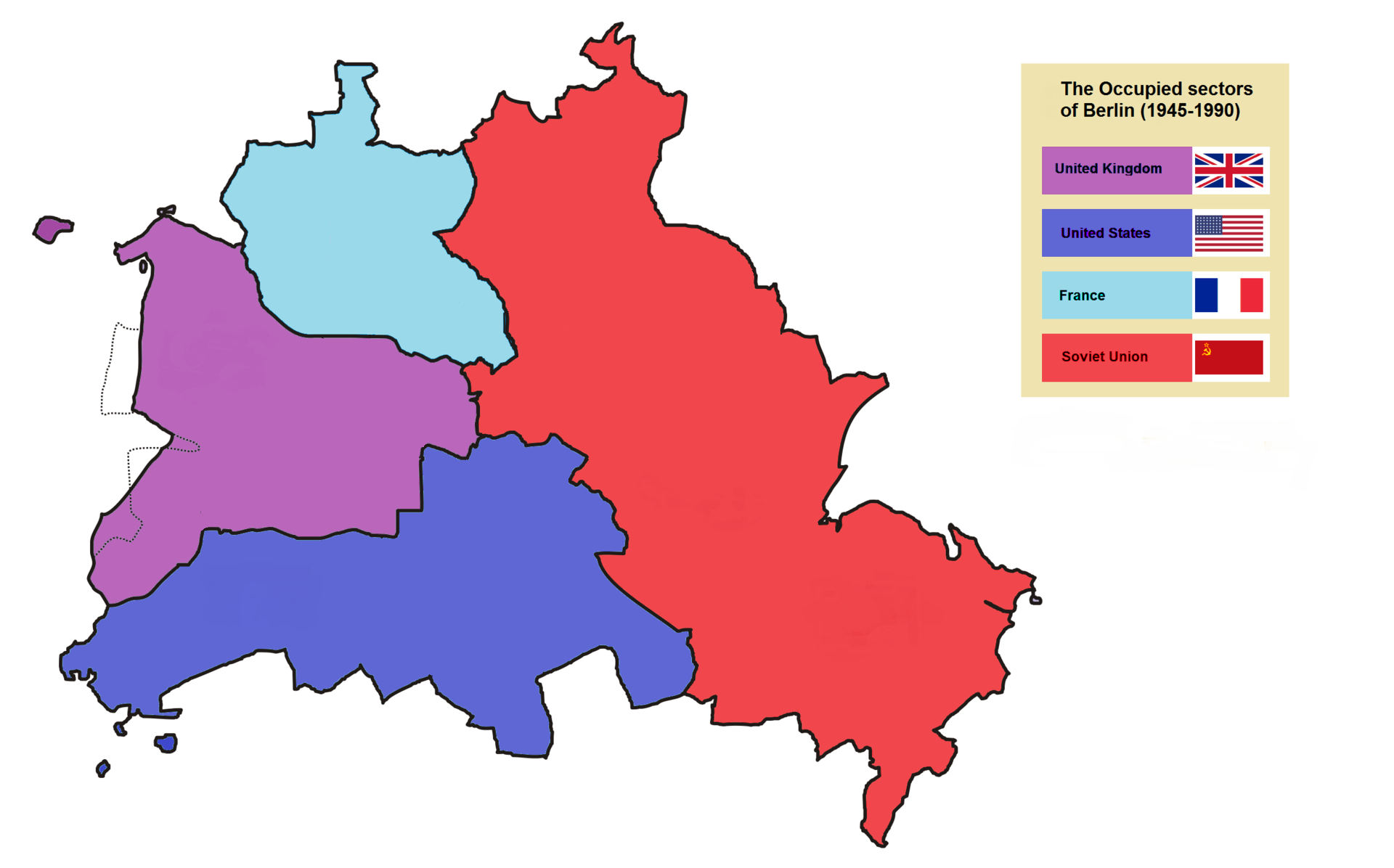
The occupied sectors of Berlin

== See also ==
- List of United States Army installations in Germany

== Bibliography ==
- John Gimbel: Amerikanische Besatzungspolitik in Deutschland 1945–1949. S. Fischer Verlag, Frankfurt am Main 1971, ISBN 3-10-026101-1.
- Klaus-Dietmar Henke: Die amerikanische Besetzung Deutschlands. 3rd edition. Oldenbourg, München 2009, ISBN 978-3-486-59079-1.
- Ralph Willett: The Americanization of Germany, 1945–1949. (Revised edition). Routledge, London 1992, ISBN 978-0-41507710-1.
- Earl F. Ziemke: The U.S. Army in the Occupation of Germany, 1944–1946. Center of Military History, United States Army, Washington D.C. 1990 (history.army.mil).
