= Mein Waldeck =

German patriotic song

Mein Waldeck is a German patriotic song and was the anthem of the Waldeck between 1879 and 1929, when the region became part of Prussia.

== History ==
Benjamin Christoph Friedrich Rose (1755–1818) composed the melody for the poem "Unter dieser Eiche lasst euch nieder" by Philipp Ludwig Bunsen. In 1879, this melody became the unofficial anthem of Waldeck after Princess Emma of Waldeck and Pyrmont married King William III of the Netherlands, which created the need for a regional anthem.

In 1890, August Koch wrote the text of Mein Waldeck to the already existing tune. An anecdote says that Koch and some friends were lampooned during a festival because they were not able to sing a song that praises their native land. In the following weeks, Koch started to write such a song.

== Lyrics ==
Unter allen Landen deutscher Erde
Preis ich Waldeck, mein lieb Heimatland.
Bis zum letzten Atemzug werde
Ihm ich weihen treulich Herz und Hand.

Refrain:
Mein Waldeck, lebe hoch! Mein Waldeck, lebe hoch!
Mein teures, liebes Waldeck, es lebe, lebe hoch!

Seht das Land im Schmuck der schönsten Wälder,
Wenn der Lenz mit neuer Pracht einzieht,
Wenn die Berge, Täler, Wiesen, Felder
Grün geziert so weit das Auge sieht.

Refrain

Wie so mächtig auf den Höhen rauschen
Eich’ und Buche, trotzend Sturm und Wind!
Hirsch und Reh im stillen Waldgrund lauschen,
Wo der Quell zum klaren Bächlein rinnt.

Refrain

Echte Deutsche sind in Waldecks Gauen.
Sachs’ und Franke reichen sich die Hand.
Fürst und Volk einander stets vertrauen,
Lieb’ und Treue sind ihr festes Band.

Refrain

Schwarz-Rot-Gold sind meine Landesfarben.
Dunkler Nacht folgt goldnes Morgenrot.
Für Alldeutschland Waldecks Söhne starben,
Deutsche Treu bewährend bis zum Tod.

Refrain

Fest, o Waldeck, steh zum Deutschen Reiche,
Wie dein hohes Felsenschloss so fest!
Grün und blüh gleich deiner schönsten Eiche,
Stürmt es auch von Osten oder West.

Refrain

Translation:

Among all lands on German soil,
I praise Waldeck, my beloved homeland.
Until my last breath I will
Loyally devote to it heart and hand.

Refrain:
My Waldeck cheers to thee, my Waldeck cheers to thee,
My dear, beloved Waldeck, cheers to thee!

See the land adorned with beautiful forests,
When spring arrives with new splendour,
When hills, valleys, meadows, fields
Are green so far the eye can see.

Refrain

How mighty rustle on the heights,
Oak and beech trees bravely resisting storm and wind.
Deer and roe listen in the silent forest valley,
Where the source gives birth to the clear stream.

Refrain

True Germans live in Waldeck’s places,
Saxonian and Franconian shake hands.
Prince and people firmly trust each other,
Love and loyalty are their solid bonds.

Refrain

Black, Red, and Gold are the colours of my land,
Dark night is followed by golden morning dawn.
For all Germany Waldeck’s sons died,
German loyalty preserving till their end.

Refrain

Be steadfast, o Waldeck, loyal to the German Empire,
Firm like your high rock castle!
Green and flourish like your most beautiful oak tree,
Resistings storms whether from East or West.

Refrain

== See also ==
- Auferstanden aus Ruinen
- Bayernhymne
- Deutschlandlied
- Heil dir im Siegerkranz
