= Province of Kurhessen =

Province of Prussia (1944–1945)

Province of Kurhessen Provinz Kurhessen (German)
- Province of Prussia
- 1944–1945
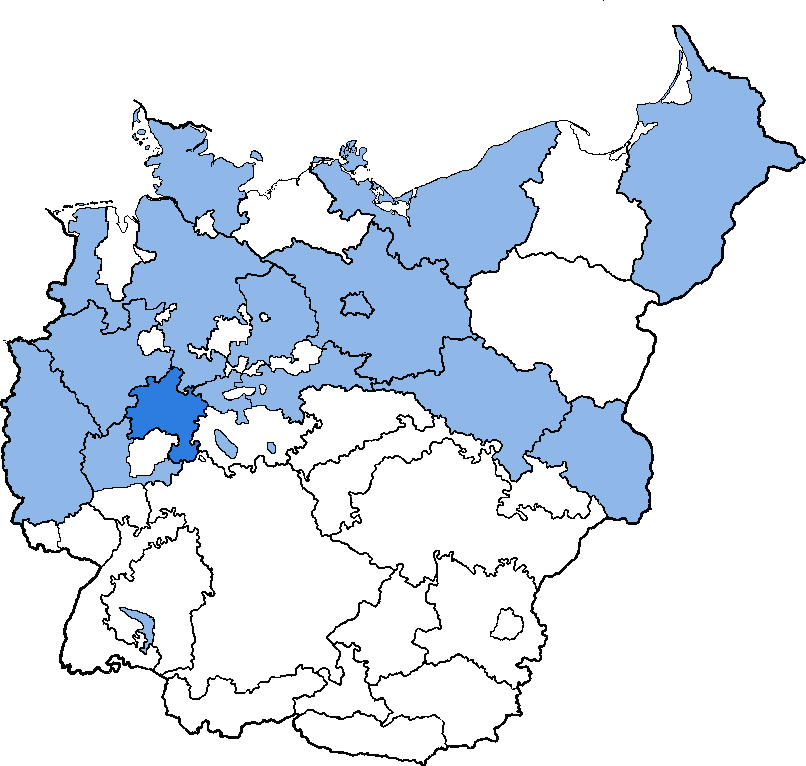
- The Province of Kurhessen in 1944.
- Capital: Kassel
- Area
  - 1944: 9,200 km^{2} (3,600 sq mi)
- Population
  - 1944: 971,887
- Government
  - Type: Province
- High President
  - 1944–1945: Karl Gerland
- Historical era: World War II
  - Established: 1 July 1944
  - Disestablished: 19 September 1945
Preceded by	Succeeded by
Hesse-Nassau	Greater Hesse

The Province of Kurhessen (German: Provinz Kurhessen) or Electoral Hesse was a province of Prussia within Nazi Germany between 1944 and 1945.

Although all German states, including Prussia, had de facto been dissolved since 1933, the Nazi government formally partitioned the Prussian Province of Hesse-Nassau into two provinces effective with a decree issued on 1 April 1944 and effective on 1 July 1944. The two new provinces were the province of Kurhessen and the Province of Nassau.

Following the end of World War II, Kurhessen fell under American administration. The province was dissolved by the occupying US forces on 19 September 1945 and formed part of the administrative zone of Greater Hesse. Just over a year later, Greater Hesse became the modern German state of Hesse.

== Etymology ==
The name Kurhessen comes from the former Electorate of Hesse-Kassel (or Hesse-Cassel; 1803–1866) which, following the Austro-Prussian War, Prussia annexed to form part of the Province of Hesse-Nassau. This is also where its anglicized name Electoral Hesse comes from.
