= Greater Hesse =

Provisional name for a section of German territory

Greater Hesse Groß-Hessen
- Subdivision of American-administered Germany
- 1945–1946
- Greater Hesse (bright orange) within the US-administered zone of post-World War II Germany (pale orange).
- Capital: Wiesbaden
- Government
  - Type: Military occupation
- Minister-President
  - September–October 1945: Ludwig Bergsträsser
  - October 1945 – December 1946: Karl Geiler
- Historical era: World War II
  - Established: 19 September 1945
  - Disestablished: 1 December 1946
Preceded by
People's State of Hesse
Province of Kurhessen
Province of Nassau
Succeeded by
Hesse

Greater Hesse (German: Groß-Hessen) was the provisional name given for a section of German territory created by the United States military administration in at the end of World War II. It was formed by the Allied Control Council on 19 September 1945 and became the modern German state of Hesse on 1 December 1946.

== Formation ==
Greater Hesse was formed from parts of two German states that were dissolved in the aftermath of World War II:

- The part of the People's State of Hesse that lay east of the Rhine: the provinces of Upper Hesse (Oberhessen, capital: Gießen) and Starkenburg (capital: Darmstadt).
- The Prussian provinces of Kurhessen (capital: Kassel) and Nassau (capital: Wiesbaden). These two provinces were formed from the division of the province of Hesse-Nassau in 1944.

The remaining Hessian province of Rhenish Hesse (Rheinhessen, capital: Mainz) and the western part of the province of Nassau (containing the Westerwald, part of the Taunus range and the Rhine end of the Lahn river) became part of the French occupation zone and eventually part of the modern state of Rhineland-Palatinate. The separation of Rhenish Hesse from Greater Hesse caused Mainz to lose its six districts that lay east of the Rhine, even though they are still named today as being part of Mainz – such as Mainz-Kastel, now a district of Wiesbaden.

A number of smaller territorial changes also took place. The enclave of Bad Wimpfen, which previously belonged to the Hessian province of Starkenburg, became part of American-administered Württemberg-Baden. A small part of the Prussian province of Hesse, containing the town of Schmalkalden, lay in the Soviet zone and became part of the state of Thuringia.

This new territory was named Hesse because most of the territory that comprised it had previously belonged to successor states of the Landgraviate of Hesse, which was divided in 1567.

== The new Hessian capital ==
While Proclamation No. 2 of the Allied Control Council declared the territory that would comprise Greater Hesse, no capital was specified. Four cities were considered for the new capital:

- Frankfurt, the former Imperial city (annexed by Prussia in 1866, see Free City of Frankfurt), was by far the largest city in the new region. Given its role as locale for imperial elections during the Holy Roman Empire and as federal council seat of the German Confederation (see Frankfurt Parliament), Frankfurt was considered to be an ideal candidate for a future national capital of West Germany in the absence of a united Berlin. However, Frankfurt declined the position of Hessian state capital since it had only 90 years prior become part of Hessian territory and it was thought that the city could not identify enough with the new region. Another reason for Frankfurt's unsuitability as state capital was that most of the city had been destroyed by Allied bombing during the war.
- Darmstadt, the former Hessian capital, was also considered unsuitable due to its war damage.
- Kassel, the capital of the Prussian province of Kurhessen, was considered unsuitable, not only due to its war damage but also due to its peripheral location in the comparably sparsely populated north of the new state.
- Wiesbaden, the capital of the Prussian province of Nassau, suffered relatively minor damage from the war. This, combined with its location within the Rhine-Main metropolitan area and the fact that it was already a regional seat of the US military administration, made Wiesbaden the best choice.

On 12 October 1945, the first organisational directive for Greater Hesse (Organisationsverfügung Nr. 1) was announced. Point number one of this directive stated that the civilian capital for Greater Hesse would be Wiesbaden, effective from noon on that day.

== Administration ==
In addition to the establishment of Wiesbaden as the new Hessian capital, 12 October 1945 saw the installment of high-school teacher Karl Geiler as minister-president. Geiler replaced SPD-politician Ludwig Bergsträsser, who served as acting minister-president for only one month and would remain in office until a successor could be democratically elected.

On 22 November 1945, the constitution for Greater Hesse (Staatsgrundgesetz des Staates Groß-Hessen) was introduced. This constitution was superseded on 1 December 1946 with the establishment of the modern state of Hesse. On the day that Hesse was established, the first state legislative elections were held, leading to the appointment of Christian Stock on 20 December as the first democratically elected minister-president of Hesse.
