= Province of Hesse-Nassau =

Province of Prussia (1868–1944)

Province of Hesse-Nassau Provinz Hessen-Nassau (German)
- Province of Prussia
- 1868–1944
- Flag Coat of arms

- The Province of Hesse-Nassau (red), within the Kingdom of Prussia (blue), within the German Empire
- Capital: Kassel
- Area
  - 1905: 15,699.3 km^{2} (6,061.5 sq mi)
  - 1939: 16,845 km^{2} (6,504 sq mi)
- Population
  - 1905: 2,070,076
  - 1939: 2,688,922
- History
  - Established: 1868
  - Disestablished: 1944
- Political subdivisions: Kassel; Wiesbaden
Preceded by
Electorate of Hesse
Duchy of Nassau
Free City of Frankfurt
Grand Duchy of Hesse
Kingdom of Bavaria
Succeeded by
Province of Kurhessen
Province of Nassau
- Today part of: Germany

The Province of Hesse-Nassau (German: Provinz Hessen-Nassau) was a province of the Kingdom of Prussia from 1868 to 1918, then a province of the Free State of Prussia until 1944.

The Prussian province was officially formed in 1868 by a Royal Decree of 7 December 1868, which merged the two administrative districts of Kassel and Wiesbaden; however, it had already come into being through the annexations of Hesse-Kassel, Nassau, and Frankfurt in 1866 and was organized by decrees of March 1867 (concerning the municipal constitutions).

== History ==
Hesse-Nassau was created as a consequence of the Austro-Prussian War of 1866 by combining the previously independent Hesse-Kassel (or Hesse-Cassel), the Duchy of Nassau, the Free City of Frankfurt, areas gained from the Kingdom of Bavaria, and areas gained from the Grand Duchy of Hesse (including part of the former Landgraviate of Hesse-Homburg from Hesse-Darmstadt). These regions were combined to form the province Hesse-Nassau in 1868 with its capital in Kassel and redivided into two administrative regions: Kassel and Wiesbaden. The largest part of the province surrounded the province of Upper Hesse in the Grand Duchy of Hesse (People's State of Hesse from 1918).

On 1 April 1929, the Free State of Waldeck became a part of Hesse-Nassau after a popular vote, becoming part of the Kassel administrative region.

In 1935, the Nazi government de facto abolished all states, so the provinces held little meaning. Nevertheless, effective 1 July 1944, Hesse-Nassau was split into the provinces of Kurhessen (capital in Kassel) and Nassau (capital in Wiesbaden). On 19 September 1945, after the end of World War II, these two provinces were re-merged and combined with most of the neighbouring People's State of Hesse to form Greater Hesse, which became the modern state of Hesse in 1946. Parts of Nassau were also moved into the Rhineland-Palatinate.

== Oberpräsidents ==
The Oberpräsident ('High Commissioner') was the chief administrator of a Prussian province, appointed by the King on the advice of the Prussian Minister for the Interior. The Oberpräsident administered the province with the assistance of a Prussian government-appointed provincial council.

Oberpräsidenten for the Province of Hesse-Nassau
Name	Image	Born-Died	Party affiliation	Start of Tenure	End of Tenure
Eduard von Möller		1814–1880		1867	1871
Ludwig von Bodelschwingh		1811–1879		1872	1875
August von Ende		1815–1889	DRP	1876	1881
Botho zu Eulenburg		1831–1912	DkP	1881	1892
Eduard von Magdeburg		1844–1932		1892	1898
Robert von Zedlitz-Trützschler		1837–1914		1898	1903
Ludwig von Windheim		1857–1935		1903	1907
Wilhelm Hengstenberg				1907	1917
August von Trott zu Solz		1855–1938		1917	1919
Rudolf Schwander		1868–1950		1919	1930
August Haas		1881–1945	SDP	1930	1932
Ernst von Hülsen		1875–1950		1932	1933
Philipp von Hessen		1896–1980	Nazi	1933	1943
Ernst Beckmann		1893–1957	Nazi	1943	1944

== Population ==
Historical population numbers
	1871	1875	1880	1890	1900	1925	1933	1939
Evangelical christians	988.041	-	-	1.156.457	1.308.016	1.631.157	1.776.895	1.798.267
Catholic christians	371.736	-	-	455.477	530.541	674.175	709.701	741.384
Other christian affiliation	3.892	-	-	7.625	10.611	4.271	1.283	12.299
Jews	36.390	-	-	44.543	48.105	52.757	46.923	20.662
Total	1.400.370	1.467.898	1.554.376	1.664.426	1.897.981	2.396.871	2.584.828	2.675.111

== Insignia ==
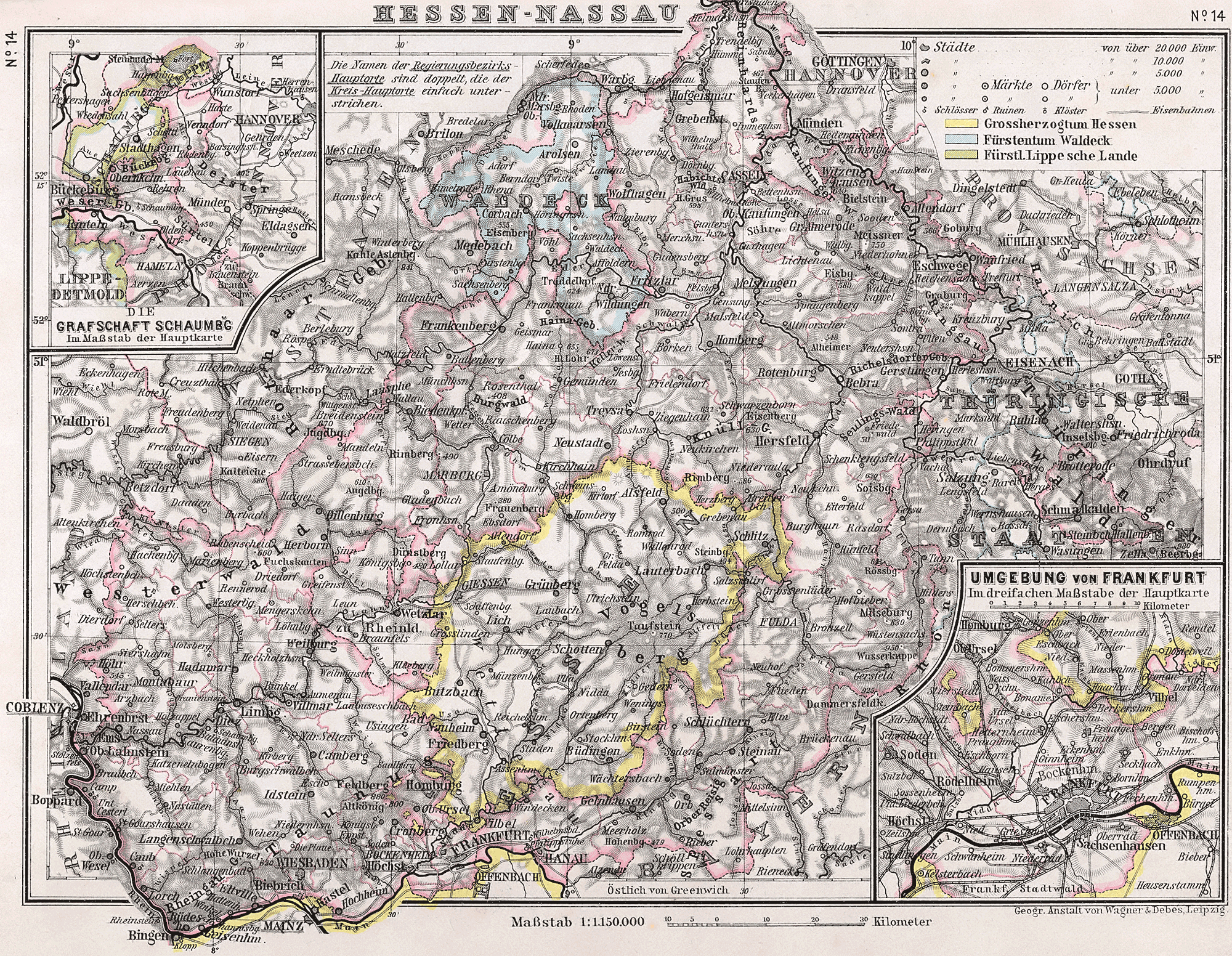
Hesse-Nassau in 1905

The flag of Hesse-Nassau is identical to that of the Netherlands. The Dutch royal house originates from the Duchy of Nassau.

The coat of arms is split into three parts, each part showing the coats of arms for the three entities that formed Hesse-Nassau:

- a crowned, silver/red-striped lion on a blue background (Electorate of Hesse)
- a crowned, golden lion on a blue field strewn with billets (Duchy of Nassau)
- a silver eagle with golden talons on a red background (Free City of Frankfurt)
