= Fritz Wächtler =

German Nazi Party official and politician (1891–1945)

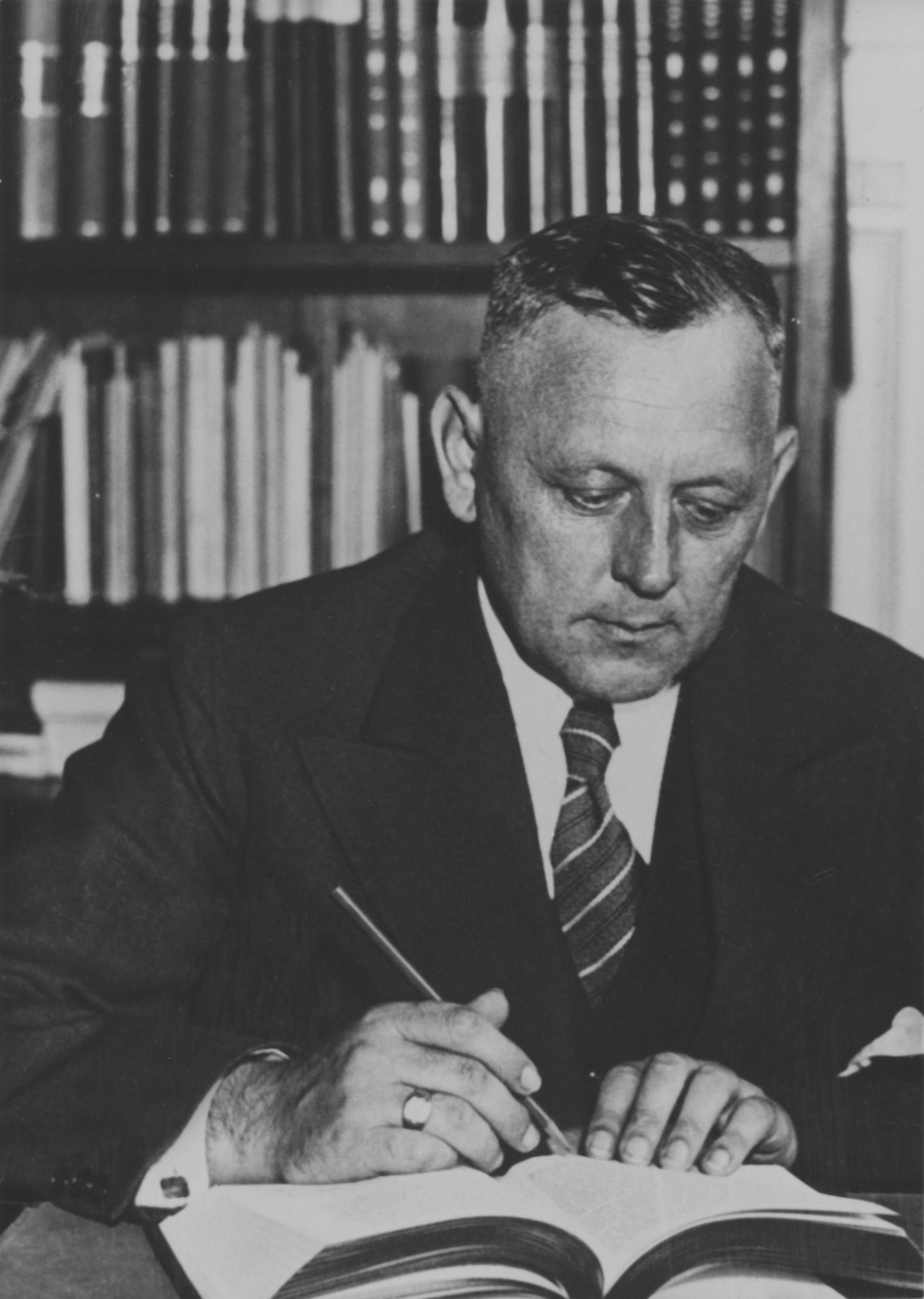

Gauleiter of Gau Bayreuth
- In office 5 December 1935 – 19 April 1945
- Appointed by: Adolf Hitler
- Preceded by: Hans Schemm
- Succeeded by: Ludwig Ruckdeschel

Head of the National Socialist Teachers League
- In office 5 December 1935 – 17 February 1943
- Appointed by: Adolf Hitler
- Preceded by: Hans Schemm
- Succeeded by: Post abolished

Deputy Gauleiter of Gau Thuringia
- In office 15 June 1932 – 5 December 1935
- Appointed by: Adolf Hitler
- Preceded by: Willy Marschler
- Succeeded by: Heinrich Siekmeier

Interior Minister of Thuringia
- In office 8 May 1933 – 22 January 1936
- Prime Minister: Willy Marschler
- Preceded by: Fritz Sauckel
- Succeeded by: Walter Ortlepp

Personal details
- Born: 7 January 1891 Triebes, Principality of Reuss-Gera, German Empire
- Died: 19 April 1945 (aged 54) Waldmünchen, Bavaria, Nazi Germany
- Cause of death: Execution by firing squad
- Party: Nazi Party
- Profession: Teacher

Military service
- Allegiance: German Empire
- Branch/service: Imperial German Army
- Years of service: 1913–1918
- Rank: Leutnant
- Unit: Infantry Regiment 94; Landwehr Infantry Regiment 7
- Battles/wars: World War I
- Awards: Iron Cross, 2nd class

Fritz Wächtler (7 January 1891 – 19 April 1945) was a Nazi Party official and politician who served as the Gauleiter of the eastern Bavarian administrative region of Gau Bayreuth. Trained as a primary school teacher, he also became head of the National Socialist Teachers League (NSLB) in 1935. During World War II he held the honorary rank of SS-Obergruppenführer and was the Reich Defense Commissioner of Gau Bayreuth. Prone to alcoholic outbursts and unpopular with the local residents, he eventually ran afoul of Martin Bormann in a political intrigue. Wächtler was executed on orders from Führer Headquarters near the end of the war on 19 April 1945.

== Early life ==
Fritz Wächtler was born in 1891 in Triebes, in the Principality of Reuss-Gera (present-day Thuringia), the son of a watchmaker. He attended volksschule in Triebes and Erfurt, and between 1905 and 1911 he attended the Weimar Lehrerseminar, a special training academy for primary school teachers. After two years working as a teacher in Vippachedelhausen, he volunteered for military service in October 1913 as a "one-year volunteer" (German: Einjährigfreiwilliger) with Infantry Regiment 94, "Grand Duke of Saxony." On the outbreak of World War I he was deployed to the western front. By August 1915 he had been promoted to Leutnant and served as the commander of a machine gun company with his original regiment and, later, Landwehr Infantry Regiment 7. In the spring of 1916 he was twice wounded in action and classified as unfit for front-line duty. However, in January 1918 he was returned to the front, serving there until discharged at the end of the war in November. During the war he received many decorations, including the Iron Cross, 2nd class. After discharge from the service, Wächtler returned to his teaching position in Vippachedelhausen, working as an educator until 1932.

== Nazi career ==
Wächtler joined the Nazi Party (membership number 35,313) on 26 April 1926. He founded the local branch of the Party in Vippachedelhausen, becoming the Ortsgruppenleiter (Local Group Leader) there for the next two years. He also joined the Sturmabteilung (SA) becoming the SA-Führer for the Weimar-North district. From 1927 to 1932 he also became the Party Kreisleiter (District Leader) for Weimar-North. From 1928 to 1932 he served as the only Nazi member of the Kreisrat (District Council) in Landkreis Weimar. On 8 December 1929, Wächtler was elected as a member of the Landtag of Thuringia where he would serve until October 1933. From 1929 to 1932, he was the Business Manager and Training Officer for Gau Thuringia. Then on 15 June 1932, he was made the Organization Leader and Deputy Gauleiter there under Fritz Sauckel. On 26 August 1932, Wächtler was appointed Education Minister in the cabinet formed by Sauckel when he became Minister President of Thuringia.

Following the Nazi Seizure of Power in 1933, Sauckel was made Reichsstatthalter (Reich Governor) of Thuringia. Wächtler remained as education minister and, on 8 May 1933, was also named interior minister; on 13 May he was also made deputy to the new minister president, Willy Marschler. Wächtler retained all these posts until 22 January 1936. As the powerful interior minister, he had control over all the police and security apparatus of the State. Wächtler was elected a member of the Reichstag for electoral constituency 12, Thuringia, on 12 November 1933. He would remain a Reichstag deputy until his death, switching to constituency 25, Lower Bavaria–Upper Palatinate, at the 29 March 1936 election.

In November 1934, Wächtler joined the Schutzstaffel (SS-Number 209,058) as an SS-Oberführer. By the end of January 1936 he was promoted to the rank of SS-Brigadeführer, in April 1937 to SS-Gruppenführer and, finally, on 1 August 1944 to SS-Obergruppenführer. He was assigned to the staff of the Reichsführer-SS from April 1937 until his death.

=== Gauleiter ===
On 5 March 1935 the first Gauleiter of the Gau Bavarian Eastern March, Hans Schemm, died in an airplane crash. For an interim period the Gau was run by the Deputy Gauleiter Ludwig Ruckdeschel in an acting capacity. However, on 5 December Wächtler was appointed the permanent Gauleiter in place of Ruckdeschel. This would engender a rivalry between them that would have dire consequences for Wächtler. The Gau capital of Bayreuth was home to the family of Richard Wagner and the site of the annual Bayreuth Festival, supported and regularly attended by Adolf Hitler. As such, its Gauleiter was considered a high-profile posting. Wächtler at the same time also succeeded Schemm as head of the National Socialist Teachers League (NSLB) and head (Hauptamtsleiter) of the Main Office for Education in the Party Reichsleitung (National Leadership). From January 1936 he also was the Expert on All School Questions on the Party headquarters staff of Deputy Führer Rudolf Hess. In this position he had supervisory authority over the Reichsschule Feldafing, an elite Party leadership school.

At the 29 March 1936 elections, Wächtler was returned as a Reichstag Deputy for electoral constituency 25, Niederbayern (Lower Bavaria). For a short period in 1938 he served as the acting Oberbürgermeister of Bayreuth. Unlike Schemm, Wächtler was an outsider to Bavarians and enjoyed no popularity among the residents of his Gau or among the Reich leadership. He was brutal with subordinates and prone to uncontrolled alcoholic outbursts in public. One assessment of his character stated:

In place of the elegant, affable Schemm, a brilliant orator, there appeared the ungainly figure of the oratorically untalented and philistine Wächtler, whose dogged adherence to the Party line soon earned him the epithet ‘megalomaniac schoolteacher’. He rigorously put the increasingly draconian new laws into effect, above all those aimed at Jews and the churches, and as an outsider he made enemies in the area …

Even Winifred Wagner, daughter-in-law of Richard Wagner, complained repeatedly about his misconduct to her friend Hitler. However, she also frequently tried to intervene with Hitler on behalf of Jewish friends for clemency. This is likely why Wächtler, while not in Hitler's favor, remained untouched until 1945.

Wächtler was involved in organizing the anti-Jewish Kristallnacht riots of 9–10 November 1938 in his Gau. The next day, the Reich leadership in Berlin ordered cessation of further property destruction because they feared the riots they had instigated would lead to more radical actions not under their control. Wächtler tried to use the opportunity to force public school teachers to sign a personal oath that they would no longer teach any religious subjects. Highly unpopular, Rudolf Hess had to order the directive rescinded. From 1938, Wächtler's district became home to the Flossenbürg concentration camp and its many subcamps.

In February 1939, the Donau-Zeitung reported about Wächtler's visit in Hauzenberg, where the Gauleiter had dedicated a party district house. After seeing the condition of the school in Wegscheid, a new building was decided. In March 1939, when Wächtler spoke at the Passau Nibelungenhalle, the Donau-Zeitung reported an audience of 12,000. In April 1939, Wächtler purchased the Passau Haus, where Hitler had lived for two years. One year later, he donated it to the city of Passau.

On 2 June 1942, Wächtler's Gau Bavarian Eastern March was renamed Gau Bayreuth, since due to Germany's territorial expansion it was no longer a borderland region. On 16 November 1942, Wächtler was appointed Reich Defense Commissioner (Reichsverteidigungskommissar) for his Gau, and in September 1944 he became the commander of the Volkssturm units in the Gau. It was in these positions that he came to realize the war would be lost. This attitude became apparent to his superiors when he prevented the seizure of the historic Bayreuth Festspielhaus for use in defense of the city. By 1945 his additional failure to send daily situation reports to Führer Headquarters brought him to the attention and suspicion of Martin Bormann, Hitler's powerful Secretary and head of the Nazi Party Chancellery. Bormann had previously ordered the closing of the National Socialist Teachers League (NSLB) on 17 February 1943, together with all its Gau offices across Germany. Wächtler, fearing the loss of influence, complained that the NSLB was essential for the war effort in long rambling memos to Bormann, to no avail.

== Death ==
In 1945 Hitler declared the city of Bayreuth to be a fortress, which led to the destruction of over one third of the city by air raids. On 1 April 1945, Bormann issued a further order that all Gauleiters, Kreisleiters, and other NSDAP political leaders were to fight to the death in their districts. A particularly heavy air raid took place on 11 April. With much of the city in ruins and only 200 irregular defenders left, Wächtler fled Bayreuth with his staff the next day as American forces approached. He reportedly left the bomb-ruined city in a convoy of "several lorries of food, spirits and cigarettes." He set up offices at a hotel in Waldmünchen in the southern part of the Gau near the former Czechoslovak border, some 140 kilometers from Bayreuth. On 14 April, Bayreuth surrendered to the US 3rd Army without a fight. It is unclear whether communications difficulties prevented Wächtler from informing Führer Headquarters of his location, however his Deputy Gauleiter and longtime political rival Ludwig Ruckdeschel used the opportunity to contact Bormann and accuse Wächtler of desertion. On 19 April, Wächtler was relieved of all his posts and expelled from the Party for cowardice and desertion. On orders from Führer Headquarters, Ruckdeschel appeared at the hotel with 35 SS troops, pronounced a death sentence and summarily executed Wächtler by firing squad. Ruckdeschel immediately replaced Wächtler as acting Gauleiter and Reich Defense Commissioner.

A posthumous denazification proceeding was held in Ansbach, and on 17 February 1949, Wächtler was classified into Group I (Major Offender) resulting in the confiscation of his entire estate. Ruckdeschel was sentenced to 13 years in prison for several executions after the war, albeit not for that of Wächtler.

== See also ==
- List SS-Obergruppenführer

== Sources ==
- Joachim Lilla, Martin Döring, Andreas Schulz: Statisten in Uniform. Düsseldorf: Droste, 2004, ISBN 3-7700-5254-4.
- Erich Stockhorst: 5000 Köpfe. Wer war was im Dritten Reich. Kiel: Arndt, 2000, ISBN 3-88741-116-1.
- Albrecht Tyrell: Führer befiehl … – Selbstzeugnisse aus der ‚Kampfzeit' der NSDAP, Gondrom Verlag Bindlach 1991 (© 1969 Droste Verlag Düsseldorf) ISBN 3-8112-0694-X, p. 385.
