= Kurt Günther =

German Nazi SA general (1896–1947)

Führer, SA-Gruppe Thüringen
- In office 1 March 1935 – 8 May 1945
- Preceded by: Gustav Zunkel
- Succeeded by: Position abolished

Führer, SA-Untergruppe Thüringen-Ost
- In office 1 July 1932 – 28 February 1935

Führer, SA-Sturmbann I, SA-Standarte 153
- In office 1 October 1929 – 13 April 1932

Additional positions
- 1944–1945: People's Court Judge
- 1936–1945: Thuringian State Council
- 1932–1933; 1933–1945: Reichstag Deputy
- 1929–1933: Tiefengrün Municipal Council

Personal details
- Born: 31 October 1896 Gera, Principality of Reuss-Gera, German Empire
- Died: 3 April 1947 (aged 50) Weimar, State of Thuringia, Soviet occupation zone
- Cause of death: Executed by firing squad
- Party: Nazi Party
- Education: Technische Hochschule Stuttgart
- Occupation: Topographer
- Civilian awards: Golden Party Badge

Military service
- Allegiance: German Empire; Nazi Germany
- Branch/service: Imperial German Army; German Army
- Years of service: 1915–1918; 1939–1943
- Rank: Gefreiter; Oberleutnant
- Unit: Pioneer Battalion 11; Mine Laying Company 408; Infantry Regiment 307; Infantry Regiment 324
- Battles/wars: World War I World War II
- Military awards: Iron Cross, 2nd class Clasp to the Iron Cross, 2nd class Wound Badge

Kurt Wilhelm Günther (31 October 1896 – 3 April 1947) was a German surveyor who became an SA-Obergruppenführer in the Sturmabteilung, the Nazi Party paramilitary organization, and was the long-serving leader of the SA in Thuringia. He was also a Nazi politician and sat as a deputy in the Reichstag throughout most of the Third Reich. He served in the German Army during the Second World War and, after the end of the war, he was executed for war crimes by the State of Thuringia in the Soviet occupation zone.

== Early life ==
Günther was born in Gera, the son of a weaving mill foreman. He was educated in the local Mittelschule through age 16. He then trained as a surveyor for three years. In 1915 he was drafted into the Imperial German Army and fought in the First World War. He served in Pioneer Battalion 11 and in Mine Laying Company 408 on the eastern and the western fronts. He was detached for specialized training in topography from February to July 1918 at the Preußische Landesaufnahme (Prussian State Survey) in Berlin and the Technische Hochschule Stuttgart. After serving in two infantry regiments until the end of the war, he was discharged from the army in December 1918 with the rank of Gefreiter and the Iron Cross, 2nd class.

Returning to civilian life, Günther worked as a topographer at the Gera non-profit building cooperative, where he was involved in engineering projects. From August 1919 to December 1933, Günther worked in the construction department of the Hirschberg Leather factory (formerly Heinrich Knoch & Co.) in Hirschberg.

== Career in the Nazi Party and the Sturmabteilung ==
Günther joined the Nazi Party in September 1922 and was a co-founder of the Ortsgruppe (local group) in Hirschberg, where he served as the local secretary and treasurer until 1929 (excepting the period when the Party was outlawed). In the wake of the Beer Hall Putsch, he was arrested and detained briefly for his support of the failed coup. Additionally, he was fined 25 Reichsmark in June 1924 by the Hirshberg District Court for illegal possession of a firearm. On 15 February 1926, he formally rejoined the re-founded Party (membership number 30,179). As an early Party member, he later would be awarded the Golden Party Badge.

=== Political activity ===
From December 1929 to December 1933 Günther sat on the municipal council of Tiefengrün (today, part of Berg) in Upper Franconia. At the parliamentary election of July 1932, he was elected as a deputy of the Reichstag for electoral constituency 12 (Thuringia) and served until the election in November of the same year. After being out of parliament for four months, he was able to return to the Reichstag at the March 1933 election, and he retained that seat until the end of Nazi rule in May 1945. On 27 February 1936, he obtained a seat on the Thuringian State Council. From January 1936, he was a member of the Chamber of Labor for Central Germany and, from June 1938, president of the Central German Racing Association in Gotha. On 4 August 1944 he was named as an associate lay judge at the People's Court.

=== SA commands ===
Günther also joined the Nazi Party paramilitary unit, the Sturmabteilung (SA) in September 1922. In August 1927, he became the SA-Führer in Schleiz. From October 1929 to April 1932, he commanded Sturmbann (battalion) I in SA-Standarte 153 in Gera. He advanced in July 1932 to the leadership of SA-Untergruppe Thüringen-Ost. This unit obtained the designation SA-Brigade 41 in September 1933, and Günther remained at its head until the end of February 1935. Though he was arrested and detained for two days during the Night of the Long Knives at the end of June 1934, he avoided the fate of many other SA leaders, and was released to return to his command. Effective 1 March 1935, he was named Führer of SA-Gruppe Thüringen, headquartered in Weimar. On 9 November 1938, he was promoted to SA-Obergruppenführer and retained his command in Thuringia for over ten years until Germany's surrender in May 1945.

=== SA ranks ===
SA ranks
Date	Rank
1 August 1927	SA-Truppführer
30 March 1929	SA-Sturmführer
1 October 1929	SA-Standartenführer
1 July 1932	SA-Oberführer
10 November 1933	SA-Brigadeführer
9 November 1935	SA-Gruppenführer
9 November 1938	SA-Obergruppenführer

== War service, capture and execution ==
After the outbreak of the Second World War, Günther enlisted in the German Army in November 1939, entering the service as a Gefreiter of reserves with Infantry Regiment 307. In January 1940, he was transferred to Infantry Regiment 324 and took part in the air landings in Norway in April. He was then deployed to northern Finland, where he was wounded in a Soviet bombing raid on 1 September 1941. After hospitalization and recovery, he was transferred to a staff position in Potsdam in February 1942, where he remained until being discharged from the army on 8 November 1943 with the rank of Oberleutnant and having earned the Clasp to the Iron Cross, 2nd class. In the last six months of the war, he served as Chief of Staff of the Nazi Party militia, the Volkssturm, in Thuringia.

On 17 May 1946, Günther was discovered and arrested by the Soviet NKVD in Weimar, which was now located in the Soviet occupation zone. He was brought to trial before the Military Court of the State of Thuringia, convicted and sentenced to death on 20 February 1947 for war crimes. The sentence was carried out by firing squad in Weimar on 3 April 1947.

== Sources ==
- Information about Kurt Günther in the Reichstag database
- Miller, Michael D.; Schulz, Andreas (2015). Leaders of the Storm Troops. Vol. 1. Solihull, England: Helion & Company. ISBN 978-1-909-98287-1.

== Enternal links ==
- Literature by and about Kurt Günther in the German National Library catalogue
- Kurt Günther entry in Deutsche Biographie
