= List of defendants at the International Military Tribunal =

Between 20 November 1945 and 1 October 1946, the International Military Tribunal (IMT), better known as the Nuremberg trials, tried 24 of the most important political and military leaders of Nazi Germany. Of those convicted, 12 were sentenced to death and 10 hanged. Hermann Göring died by suicide the night before he was due to be hanged, and Martin Bormann was tried in absentia (unbeknownst to anyone involved, he had in fact committed suicide in May 1945).

Most of the defendants had surrendered to the United States Army, but the Soviet Union held a few high-ranking Nazis who were extradited for trial at Nuremberg. The defendants included some of the most famous Nazis, including Hermann Göring, Rudolf Hess, Joachim von Ribbentrop, and Wilhelm Keitel. Also represented were some leaders of the German economy, such as Gustav Krupp (of the conglomerate Krupp) and former Reichsbank president Hjalmar Schacht.

Defendants receiving a prison sentence were incarcerated at Spandau Prison. Following Hess's suicide, the prison was demolished.

== Choosing the defendants ==
At the London Conference, the question of which defendants to try was not much discussed. The British delegation had suggested a list of roughly a dozen names compiled by the British Foreign Office in 1944. Only one general—Wilhelm Keitel—was listed, while the rest were members of the Nazi Party. Nevertheless, the list aroused controversy in the British government, with Foreign Secretary Anthony Eden arguing that military "professionals who are merely carrying out the régime's orders" could not be considered criminals. In contrast, deputy Prime Minister Clement Attlee argued that the military leadership as well as industrialists needed to face judgement for their actions in enabling Nazi crimes. The American prosecution supported a longer list. Added to haphazardly, this list was the basis of those to be prosecuted at Nuremberg. Some of the most prominent Nazis—Adolf Hitler, Heinrich Himmler, and Joseph Goebbels—had died by suicide and therefore could not be tried. The French prosecution added Konstantin von Neurath, former governor of the Protectorate of Bohemia and Moravia. Of the Soviet suggestions, only admiral Erich Raeder and propagandist Hans Fritzsche—a stand-in for Goebbels—were accepted; the others—including general Willi Moser and SS officer Friedrich Jeckeln, a major perpetrator of the Holocaust in the Baltics, were to be considered for a future trial.

Although the list of defendants was finalized on 29 August, as late as October, chief United States prosecutor Robert Jackson demanded the addition of new names, proposing the addition of Hermann Schmitz, an IG Farben executive, Karl Wolff and other high-ranking SS officers, as well as generals Walther von Brauchitsch, Franz Halder, and the Luftwaffe's Erhard Milch. The other prosecutors refused to consider the last minute changes. Of the 24 men indicted, Martin Bormann was tried in absentia, as the Allies were unaware of his death; Krupp was too ill to stand trial; and Robert Ley had died by suicide a month before the start of the trials. The American, French, and Soviet prosecutors asked to substitute Alfried Krupp for his father, but the judges rejected this.

Initially, the Americans had planned to try fourteen organizations and their leaders, but this was narrowed to six: the Reich Cabinet, the Leadership Corps of the Nazi Party, the Gestapo, the SA, the SS and the SD, and the General Staff and High Command (OKW) of the German military (Wehrmacht). The aim was to have these organizations declared criminal, so that their members could be tried expeditiously for membership in a criminal organization. Senior American officials believed that convicting organizations was a good way of showing that not just the top German leaders were responsible for crimes, without condemning the entire German people.

== List of defendants ==
The defendants were indicted for:

1. Participation in a common plan or conspiracy for the accomplishment of a crime against peace
2. Planning, initiating and waging wars of aggression and other crimes against peace
3. Participating in war crimes
4. Crimes against humanity

The 24 accused were, with respect to each charge, either indicted but not convicted (I), indicted and found guilty (G), or not charged (—), as listed below by defendant, charge, and eventual outcome:

Photos	Name	Count				Penalty	Notes
Photos	Name	1	2	3	4	Penalty	Notes
	Martin Bormann	I	—	G	G	Death in absentia	Successor to Hess as Nazi Party Secretary. Sentenced to death in absentia. Remains found in Berlin in 1972, conclusively identified as his in 1998, and eventually dated to 2 May 1945 (per Artur Axmann's account); died by suicide, or was killed, while trying to flee Berlin in the last few days of the war.
	Karl Dönitz	I	G	G	—	10 years in prison	Senior Kriegsmarine officer responsible for submarines, Commander in Chief of the Kriegsmarine (1943–45), President of Germany (1945). Convicted of waging aggressive war and ordering war crimes, although the latter conviction was set aside in part because the United States had committed the same breach. Released 1 October 1956. Showed no regret and died 24 December 1980. Defence attorney: Otto Kranzbühler
	Hans Frank	I	—	G	G	Execution	Reich Law Leader (1933–45), Governor-General of the General Government in occupied Poland (1939–45). Confessed eagerly and was convicted of overseeing Jewish extermination policies and the ruin of Poland. Hanged 16 October 1946.
	Wilhelm Frick	I	G	G	G	Execution	Minister of the Interior (1933–43), General Plenipotentiary for Administration of the Reich (1938–43), Reich Protector of Bohemia and Moravia (1943–45). Convicted of annexing occupied territory and overseeing oppressive and inhumane policies including the Final Solution and Aktion T4. Hanged 16 October 1946.
	Hans Fritzsche	I	–	I	I	Acquitted	Radio propagandist (1933–45), last official to remain in Berlin. Acquitted for lack of evidence that he personally planned or incited atrocities. Classified as a "major offender" by a denazification court in 1947 and sentenced to 9 years hard labor. Released early in 1950. Died 27 September 1953.
	Walther Funk	I	G	G	G	Life imprisonment	Under Secretary of Propaganda (1933–37), Minister of Economics (1938–45). Convicted of making economic preparations for the war, confiscating property from Jews and the occupied territories, and importing slave laborers. Released 16 May 1957 due to ill health. Died 31 May 1960.
	Hermann Göring	G	G	G	G	Execution (not carried out)	Commander of the Luftwaffe (1935–45), Chief of the 4-Year Plan (1936–45), Reichsmarschall (1940–1945), creator of the Gestapo, Hitler's designated successor until the final month of the war. Convicted of a broad range of Nazi crimes including pursuing aggressive war, purging opponents of war, establishing concentration camps, using slave labor, conscripting prisoners of war, plundering occupied territory, and the Final Solution. Died by suicide the night before his scheduled execution.
	Rudolf Hess	G	G	I	I	Life imprisonment	Deputy Führer (1933–41), flew to Scotland in 1941 on an unauthorized peace mission. Convicted of participating in the Nazi war conspiracy and preparing for and carrying out aggressive war. Died in Spandau prison 17 August 1987 by suicide.
	Alfred Jodl	G	G	G	G	Execution	Chief of the High Command of the Wehrmacht (OKW) National Defense Section (1933–38), Chief of OKW Operations Staff (1939–45), Chief of OKW (May 1945). Convicted of planning and waging aggressive war, violating peace agreements, transmitting war crime orders, and ordering the burning of civilian houses in the Finnmark. Hanged 16 October 1946. Posthumously rehabilitated in 1953, which was later reversed. Defence attorneys: Franz Exner and Hermann Jahrreiß
	Ernst Kaltenbrunner	I	—	G	G	Execution	Higher SS and Police Leader in Austria (1938–43), Director of the Security Service and the Reich Security Main Office (1943–45). Highest-ranking SS leader tried at Nuremberg. Convicted of overseeing the concentration camp system and participating actively or tacitly in its crimes. Hanged 16 October 1946.
	Wilhelm Keitel	G	G	G	G	Execution	Head of the OKW and de facto defence minister (1938–45). Known for his unquestioning loyalty to Hitler. Convicted of violating peace agreements and issuing war crime orders, sometimes with knowledge of their illegality. Hanged 16 October 1946.
	Gustav Krupp von Bohlen und Halbach	I	–	I	I	No decision	President (1912-40) and chairman (1940–45) of Friedrich Krupp AG, charged with conspiring to rearm Germany and financing the Nazi party. Trial postponed due to ill health from a 1941 stroke. The charges remained on record should he recover. He never did, and died 16 January 1950. A motion to substitute for Gustav his son Alfried, who managed the company during the war, was rejected in view of the evidence against Gustav. Alfried was tried in the separate Krupp trial for using slave labor and sentenced to 12 years.
	Robert Ley	I	–	I	I	No decision	Head of the German Labour Front. Died by suicide before trial on 25 October 1945.
	Konstantin von Neurath	G	G	G	G	15 years in prison	Minister of Foreign Affairs (1932–38), Reich Protector of Bohemia and Moravia (1939–43). Convicted of violating peace agreements and overseeing repression of the Czech population. His intervention to release some Czechs in 1939 and absence from duty after September 1941 were accepted as mitigating factors. Released 6 November 1954 due to ill health after suffering a heart attack. Died 14 August 1956.
	Franz von Papen	I	I	—	—	Acquitted	Chancellor of Germany (1932), Vice Chancellor (1933–34), ambassador to Austria (1934–38), ambassador to Turkey (1939–44). Brokered the agreement to appoint Hitler as Chancellor. Acquitted because he pursued Nazi goals through means short of war. Classified as a Nazi "major offender" by a German denazification court in 1947 and sentenced to 8 years hard labor, which he successfully appealed. Died 2 May 1969.
	Erich Raeder	G	G	G	—	Life imprisonment	Commander in Chief of the Kriegsmarine (1928–43). Convicted of planning war of aggression, violating peace agreements, and permitting war crimes, including U-Boat attacks. As with Dönitz, the last finding was set aside. Expecting a death sentence, he was shocked to have received a life sentence instead, and unsuccessfully formally asked the Tribunal to change his sentence, hoping to be shot 16 October 1946. Released 26 September 1955 due to ill health after several petitions by his wife Erika and by German veterans. Died 6 November 1960.
	Joachim von Ribbentrop	G	G	G	G	Execution	Ambassador-Plenipotentiary (1935–36), Ambassador to the United Kingdom (1936–38), Minister of Foreign Affairs (1938–45). Convicted of violating peace agreements and inciting war crimes and Jewish extermination policies. Hanged 16 October 1946.
	Alfred Rosenberg	G	G	G	G	Execution	Racial theory ideologist, Minister of the Eastern Occupied Territories (1941–45). Convicted of violating peace agreements, pillage, slave deportations and mass killings. Hanged 16 October 1946.
	Fritz Sauckel	I	I	G	G	Execution	Gauleiter of Thuringia (1927–45), General Plenipotentiary for Labor Deployment (1942–45). Convicted of creating and overseeing a slave labor program involving millions of conscripted workers. Hanged 16 October 1946. Defence attorney: Robert Servatius.
	Dr. Hjalmar Schacht	I	I	—	—	Acquitted	President of the Reichsbank (1923–30, 1933, 1937–38), Economics Minister (1934–37), General Plenipotentiary for War Economy (1935–37), Minister without Portfolio (1937–43). Fell out with the Nazis in 1936, sidelined in 1939, and arrested in 1944. Acquitted at Nuremberg for lack of evidence that he shared the Nazis' rearmament aims. Classified as a "major offender" by a denazification court in 1947 and sentenced to 8 years hard labor, which he successfully appealed. Died 3 June 1970.
	Baldur von Schirach	I	—	—	G	20 years in prison	Head of the Hitlerjugend (1933–40), Gauleiter of Vienna (1940–45). Convicted of carrying out Jewish extermination policies in Austria. Released 30 September 1966. Died 8 August 1974.
	Arthur Seyss-Inquart	I	G	G	G	Execution	Instrumental in the Anschluss. Austrian Chancellor (1938), deputy to Frank in Poland (1939–40), Reichskommissar of the occupied Netherlands (1940–45). Convicted of violating peace agreements and ordering occupation war crimes and persecution of Jews. Hanged 16 October 1946.
	Albert Speer	I	I	G	G	20 years in prison	Hitler's friend, favorite architect, and Minister of Armaments from 1942 until the end of the war. Convicted of using slave labor, although he disclaimed responsibility for mistreatment of the laborers. Released 1 October 1966. Later portrayed himself as a bystander and dupe of the Nazis, a portrayal that has drawn significant criticism. Died 1 September 1981.
	Julius Streicher	I	—	—	G	Execution	Gauleiter of Franconia (1929–40), publisher of antisemitic newspaper Der Stürmer. Convicted of inciting ethnic persecution against Jews. Showed no remorse and denounced the process at every opportunity. Hanged 16 October 1946.
