= Johann Maier =

German Roman Catholic priest

Johann Maier

Johann Maier (23 June 1906 in Berghofen, today part of Aham, Lower Bavaria – 24 April 1945 in Regensburg) was from 1939 until his death a Catholic priest at Regensburg Cathedral. On 22 April 1945, Reich Defense Commissioner Ludwig Ruckdeschel took city defence to the extreme in Regensburg when United States Army tanks had already reached the Danube.

The next day, an excited crowd of people gathered at the Moltkeplatz – nowadays known as Dachauplatz. Johann Maier was there and bade the crowd be quiet as he had something to say. He called for the town's peaceful handover. Even before he had finished his speech, he was seized by plainclothes police. Likewise, several other demonstrators were arrested. That evening, Maier was brought before a drumhead court and sentenced to death by hanging. Michael Buchberger, the Bishop of Regensburg, was frightened into silence and hid himself in a cellar.

On the morning of 24 April 1945 at 3:25, Maier was hanged at Moltkeplatz. About his neck, he wore a sign that said "I am a saboteur". Later the Wehrmacht and the SS both fled southwards out of town; Regensburg fell without a fight.

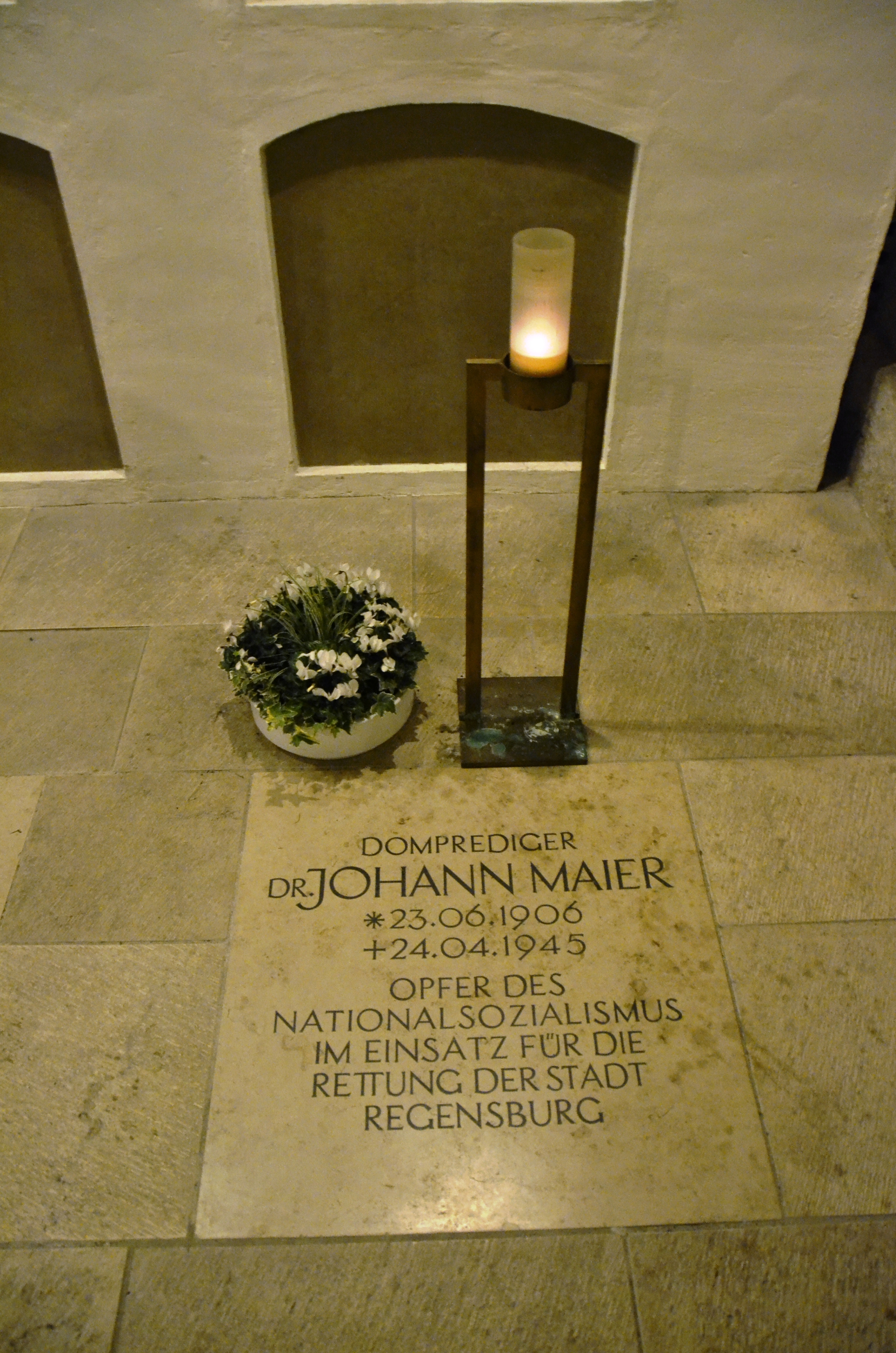
The grave of Johann Maier in the Cathedral

Maier's grave can be found in the Cathedral among the bishops' graves. There is also a memorial plaque at the Cathedral.

== Literature ==
- Werner Chrobak, Paul Mai, Barbara Möckershoff: 50 Jahre danach. Domprediger Dr. Johann Maier und seine Zeit. Schnell & Steiner, Regensburg 1995, ISBN 3-7954-1083-5
- Karl Hausberger: Sterben, damit andere leben können. Der Regensburger Domprediger Dr. Johann Maier (1906-1945). Schnell & Steiner, Regensburg 2005, ISBN 3-7954-1758-9
- Anton M. Kormann: Domprediger Dr. Johann Maier. Erinnerungen an einen Blutzeugen. 1995, ISBN 3-9804016-2-6
