= Willy Marschler =

Nazi Party politician, Thuringian Minister-President (1893–1952)

Minister-President of Thuringia
- In office 8 May 1933 – 8 May 1945
- Preceded by: Fritz Sauckel
- Succeeded by: Hermann Brill

Minister of Finance of Thuringia
- In office 26 August 1932 – 8 May 1945
- Preceded by: Irwin Baum
- Succeeded by: Leonhard Moog

Minister of Economics of Thuringia
- In office 26 August 1932 – 8 May 1945
- Preceded by: Wilhelm Kästner
- Succeeded by: Alphons Gaertner

Minister of Education of Thuringia
- In office 22 January 1936 – 8 May 1945
- Preceded by: Fritz Wachtler
- Succeeded by: Walter Wolf

Deputy Gauleiter of Gau Thuringia
- In office 1931 – 15 June 1932
- Preceded by: Hans Severus Ziegler
- Succeeded by: Fritz Wachtler

Personal details
- Born: 12 August 1893 Liegnitz, Kingdom of Prussia, German Empire
- Died: 8 November 1952 (aged 59) Karlsruhe, Baden-Württemberg, West Germany
- Party: (Nazi Germany) NSDAP
- Other political affiliations: National Socialist Freedom Movement
- Occupation: Commercial Clerk

Military service
- Allegiance: German Empire
- Branch/service: Imperial German Army
- Years of service: 1914 – 1918
- Unit: Infantry Regiment 94; Reserve Infantry Regiment 223
- Battles/wars: World War I
- Awards: Iron Cross, 2nd class

Willy Marschler (12 August 1893 – 8 November 1952) was a German Nazi Party politician who served as one of the first two Nazis to hold ministerial office in a German State. He went on to be the Minister-President of Thuringia through most of the Third Reich.

== Early life ==
Marschler was born in Liegnitz as the son of a mill owner. From 1900 to 1907 he attended volksschule in Liegnitz and Plauen. He then did a commercial apprenticeship for three years and worked as a commercial clerk until 1914. From 1914 to 1918 he participated in the First World War as a member of Infantry Regiment 94, “Grand Duke of Saxony” and Reserve Infantry Regiment 233. He was wounded twice and was awarded the Iron Cross, 2nd class. After discharge from the service, from 1919 to 1923 he worked as a commercial clerk and iron dealer in Halle and Ilmenau.

== Nazi career ==
In November 1922, Marschler joined the Nazi Party and became a member of the Ilmenau Ortsgruppe (Local Group) headed by Fritz Sauckel. After the Nazi Party was banned in the aftermath of the failed Beer Hall Putsch, Marschler was elected to the Landtag of Thuringia on 10 February 1924 as a member of the National Socialist Freedom Movement, a Nazi front organization. After the ban was lifted, he rejoined the Nazi Party on 7 December 1925 (membership number 24,216) and in the 1929 Thuringian state election, he was returned as a Nazi Party member, becoming the Second Vice-president of the Landtag. He, together with Wilhelm Frick, on 23 January 1930 joined a Thuringian State coalition government as the first Nazi Party members to hold ministerial office in any German State. Marschler was given the portfolio of Stadtsrat (Councilor of State) for Weimar. Frick, as Interior and Education Minister, began to aggressively purge members of the civil service, police and educational system. These actions proved too much for other coalition partners and, after a successful motion of no confidence against Frick on 1 April 1931, Marschler and Frick resigned.

Marschler went on to become the Deputy Gauleiter to Sauckel in Gau Thuringia. In addition, Marschler was Burgermeister (Mayor) of Ohrdruf from 1931 to 1932. After the Nazi Party victory in the 1932 Thuringian state election, Marschler served briefly as the Landtag President before becoming Minister of State for both Finance and Economics on 26 August 1932 in the cabinet of Minister-President Fritz Sauckel. After the Nazi seizure of power at the national level, Sauckel was appointed to the newly created position of Thuringian Reichsstatthalter (Reich Governor) and Marschler succeeded him as Minister-President of Thuringia on 8 May 1933 while also retaining the portfolios of Finance and Economics. After the dissolution of the Landtag in October 1933, Marschler went on to be elected as a member of the Reichstag from electoral constituency 12, Thuringia, in November 1933 and would retain this seat until May 1945. After Fritz Wächtler left the State ministry on 22 January 1936, Marschler also took on the portfolio of Minister of Education.

In 1940 Marschler was appointed head of the Thuringian State office for the Four Year Plan. In 1943 he was promoted to SA-Obergruppenführer. A holder of the Golden Party Badge, Marschler remained at the head of the Thuringian State government through the end of the Nazi regime.

== Postwar life ==
On 30 May 1945, the US Army captured Marschler in Gera and he was interned. However, due to a serious illness, on 10 October 1946 he was released on probation from the internment camp near Darmstadt. In 1948-1949 he underwent denazification proceedings and was convicted by a Bavarian court. After a stay in Dortmund he lived in Ermershausen until January 1950. He then moved to Karlsruhe, where he died.

== Sources ==
- Broszat, Martin (1987). Hitler and the Collapse of Weimar Germany. Berg Publishers Ltd. ISBN 978-0-854-96517-5.
- Hohmann, Joachim S. (1992). Landvolk unterm Hakenkreuz. Agrar- und Rassenpolitik in der Rhön. Ein Beitrag zur Landesgeschichte Bayerns, Hessens und Thüringens. P. Lang. ISBN 978-3-631-45093-2.
- Klee, Ernst (2007). Das Personenlexikon zum Dritten Reich. Wer war was vor und nach 1945. Fischer-Taschenbuch-Verlag. ISBN 978-3-596-16048-8.
- Miller, Michael D.; Schulz, Andreas (2012). Gauleiter: The Regional Leaders of the Nazi Party and Their Deputies, 1925-1945. Vol. 1 (Herbert Albrecht - H. Wilhelm Hüttmann). R. James Bender Publishing. ISBN 978-1-932970-21-0.
- Miller, Michael D.; Schulz, Andreas (2021). Gauleiter: The Regional Leaders of the Nazi Party and Their Deputies, 1925 - 1945. Vol. 3 (Fritz Sauckel - Hans Zimmermann). Fonthill Media. ISBN 978-1-781-55826-3.
- Post, Bernhard; Mahl, Volker (1999). Thüringen-Handbuch – Territorium, Verfassung, Parlament, Regierung und Verwaltung in Thüringen 1920 bis 1995. Verlag Hermann Böhlaus Nachfolger. ISBN 978-3-740-00962-5.

== External web links ==
- Information about Willy Marschler in the Reichstag database
- Willy Marschler in Files of the Reich Chancellery
