= Friedrichsberg (Lower Bavaria) =

Mountain in Germany

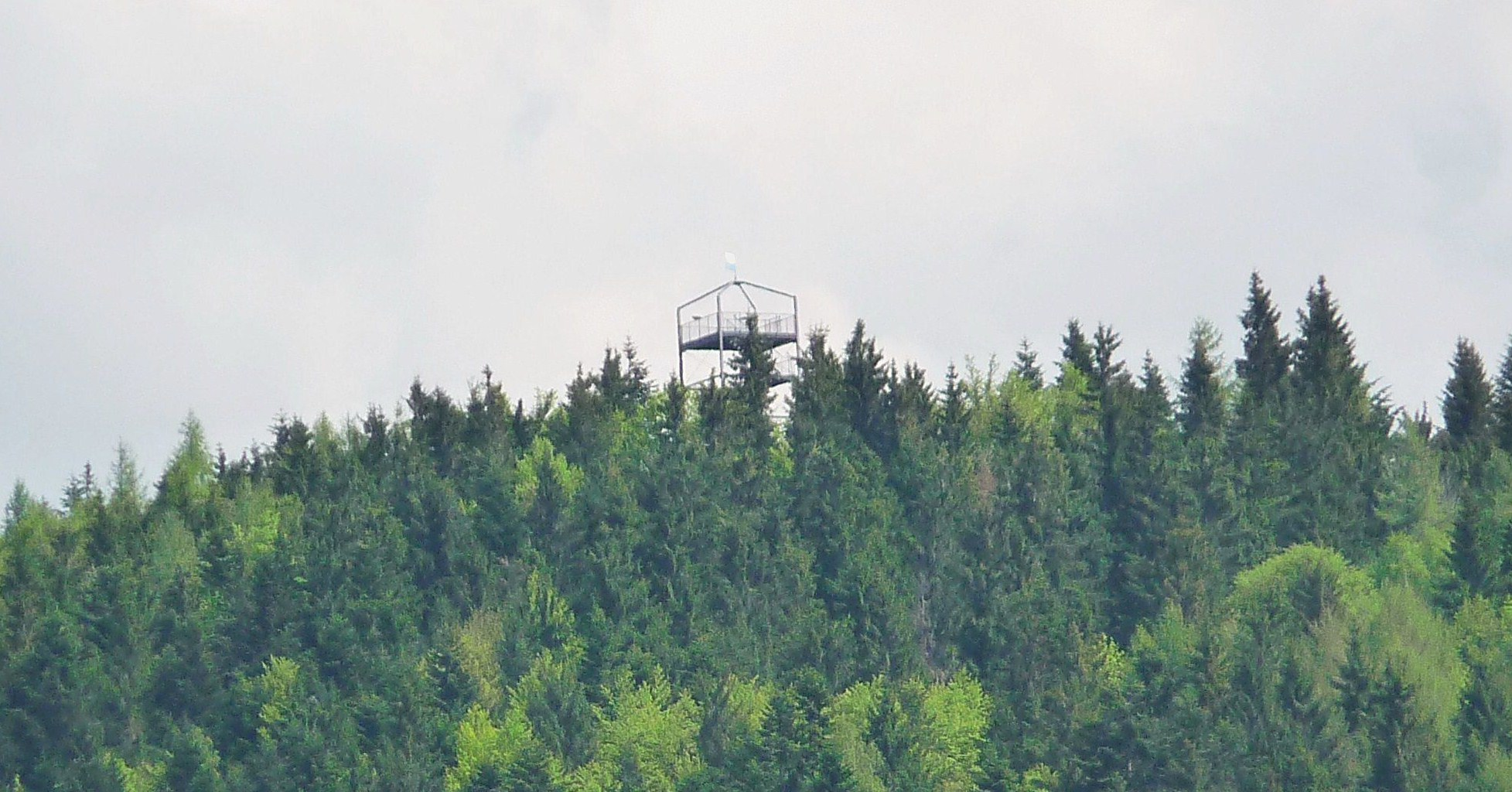
- The viewing tower at the top

Highest point
- Elevation: 930 m above sea level (NHN) (3,050 ft)
- Listing: Viewing tower
- Coordinates: 48°39′17″N 13°47′48″E

Geography
- Location within Bavaria
- Location: Bavaria, Germany
- Parent range: Bavarian Forest

Geology
- Rock type: gneiss

The Lower Bavarian Friedrichsberg is a mountain, 930 m above sea level (NHN), in the southern Bavarian Forest in Germany between the villages of Breitenberg and Wegscheid in the county of Passau not far from the border with Upper Austria.

For several years a viewing tower has stood at the top, which offers an all-round view. On clear days in föhn conditions, the chain of the Alps may be seen from the Totes Gebirge to the Kaiser Mountains. The Friedrichsberg may be climbed in a short time using one of several footpaths from the surrounding villages and hamlets.

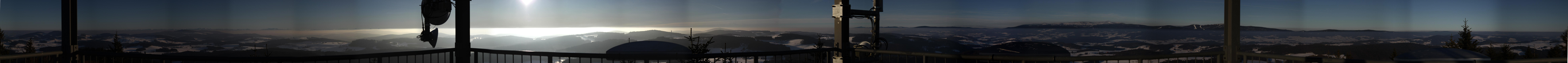
Panoramic view from the top of the viewing tower o the Friedrichsberg
