= Ludwig Ruckdeschel =

German Nazi politician (1907–1986)

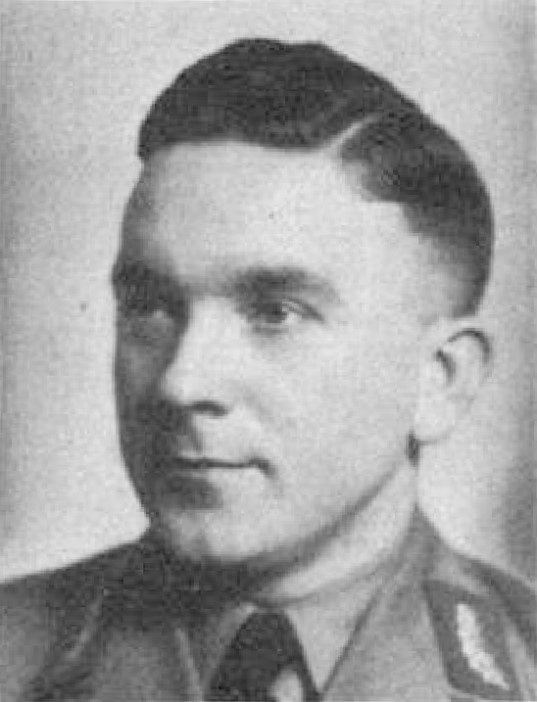
- Ruckdeschel in 1938

Acting Gauleiter of Gau Bayreuth
- In office 19 April 1945 – 8 May 1945
- Preceded by: Fritz Wächtler
- Succeeded by: Gau abolished

Acting Gauleiter of Gau Bayerische Ostmark
- In office 5 March 1935 – 5 December 1935
- Preceded by: Hans Schemm
- Succeeded by: Fritz Wächtler

Deputy Gauleiter of Gau Bayerische Ostmark, later Gau Bayreuth
- In office 1 February 1933 – 19 April 1945
- Preceded by: Gau established
- Succeeded by: None

Personal details
- Born: 15 March 1907 Bayreuth, German Empire
- Died: 8 November 1986 (aged 79) Wolfsburg, West Germany
- Party: Nazi Party

Ludwig Ruckdeschel (15 March 1907 – 8 November 1986) was the Acting Nazi Gauleiter of Bayreuth during the final month of the Gau's existence before the collapse of Nazi Germany in 1945. Before this, from 1933, he served as the Deputy Gauleiter, first to Hans Schemm, and then to Fritz Wächtler, whom he had executed on orders by Martin Bormann. From 1933 to 1945 he was also a member of the German Parliament, the Reichstag.

During the Second World War Ruckdeschel served in the Waffen-SS, rising to the rank of Obersturmbannführer. After the war he was arrested in 1947 and sentenced to 13 years in prison but released in 1952.

== Early life ==
Ruckdeschel was born in Bayreuth, then part of the Kingdom of Bavaria within the German Empire in 1907. After finishing his education he became a merchant.

== Nazi Party career ==
Ruckdeschel joined a nationalist youth organisation in 1921 and the SA in 1923. He was a founding member of the Ortsgruppe (local branch) of the Nazi Party in Bayreuth in February 1925 and became a close protégé of Ortsgruppenleiter Hans Schemm. He served as the Ortsgruppe secretary 1926–1927. From 1928 onward he became a permanent employee of the Gau administration. In this role he was responsible for the publication of right-wing books and newspapers. In October 1928 he became the business manager, propaganda leader and treasurer of the Gau Lower Franconia (Oberfranken) under now Gauleiter Schemm. He served as Schemm's permanent deputy, and in September 1932 was formally named Deputy Gauleiter.

On 1 February 1933 Ruckdeschel became Deputy Gauleiter of the newly formed Gau Bavarian East March (Bayerische Ostmark) again under Schemm. (This Gau was renamed Gau Bayreuth in June 1942.) He also was elected a member of the Reichstag in November 1933 from electoral constituency 25, Lower Bavaria–Upper Palatinate and held this seat until 1945.

In September 1934 Ruckdeschel transferred from the SA to the SS, joining as a Sturmhauptführer but receiving frequent promotions after this. With the death of Hans Schemm in a plane crash on 5 March 1935, Ruckdeschel temporarily became Acting Gauleiter for nine months until Fritz Wächtler was appointed as permanent Gauleiter on 5 December 1935.

Ruckdeschel was called up for service in the SS Division Totenkopf in April 1940. He was drafted into the Wehrmacht in July 1941, serving in a propaganda unit, but released again in October. From December 1941 onward he served in a war correspondent role in the Waffen-SS. He was transferred to the SS Division Leibstandarte Adolf Hitler in May 1942 and became a company commander in the SS Division Hitlerjugend in May 1943. He was promoted to Hauptsturmführer on 21 June 1944 and severely wounded six days later, losing his right arm. After recovery from his injuries Ruckdeschel spend time in a SS training unit before serving as an inspector of the Volkssturm from January 1945 onward. It was at this point that he was promoted to SS-Obersturmbannführer.

Ruckdeschel, according to the historian Ian Kershaw, was a fanatical Nazi. After Gauleiter Wächtler left Bayreuth on 13 April 1945 ahead of advancing US forces, Ruckdeschel denounced his long-term rival as a coward and deserter. On orders from Martin Bormann, he led an SS contingent that executed Wachtler on 19 April. He then served as the Acting Gauleiter and Reich Defense Commissioner of Gau Bayreuth in the final weeks of the war.

== Post-war life ==
In post-war Germany Ruckdeschel was arrested in August 1947 and sentenced to eight years in jail the following year for attempted manslaughter and negligence for the execution of two citizens of Regensburg, one of them the preacher Johann Maier, who had advocated the peaceful surrender of the city. The sentence was expanded to 13 years in 1949. Released in 1952 he worked for Volkswagen until 1968 and died in Wolfsburg in 1986.
