= Gau Bayreuth =

Administrative division of Nazi Germany

Gau Bayreuth Gau Bayerische Ostmark
- Gau of Nazi Germany
- 1933–1945
- Flag Coat of arms

- Map of Nazi Germany showing its administrative subdivisions (Gaue and Reichsgaue).
- Capital: Bayreuth
- Area
  - 17 May 1939: 29,600 km^{2} (11,400 sq mi)
- Population
  - 17 May 1939: 2,220,873
- Government
- Gauleiter
  - 1933–1935: Hans Schemm
  - 1935–1945: Fritz Wächtler
  - 1945: Ludwig Ruckdeschel
- History
  - Establishment: 19 January 1933
  - Disestablishment: 8 May 1945
Preceded by	Succeeded by
Bavaria; Czechoslovakia	Bavaria; Czechoslovakia
- Today part of: Germany; Czech Republic

Gau Bayreuth (until June 1942, Gau Bayerische Ostmark, 'Bavarian Eastern March') was an administrative division of Nazi Germany formed by the 19 January 1933 merger of Gaue in Lower Bavaria, Upper Palatinate and Upper Franconia, Bavaria. It was in existence from 1933 to 1945.

== History ==
The Nazi Gau (plural Gaue) system was originally established in a party conference on 22 May 1926, in order to improve administration of the party structure. From 1933 onwards, after the Nazi seizure of power, the Gaue increasingly replaced the German states as administrative subdivisions in Germany.

At the head of each Gau stood a Gauleiter, a position which became increasingly more powerful, especially after the outbreak of the Second World War. Local Gauleiters were in charge of propaganda and surveillance and, from September 1944 onwards, the Volkssturm and the defence of the Gau.

The Gau Bayerische Ostmark was formed in 1933, when Hans Schemm, the gauleiter of Oberfranken, united the three Gaue of Oberpfalz, Niederbayern and Oberfranken into one in an internal power struggle. The term Bayerische Ostmark was coined after the First World War for the region to refer to the fact that the area now bordered the new Czechoslovakia, a country perceived as hostile to Germany. The term Mark (English: March) was historically used in Imperial Germany for border regions to hostile neighbors. It was the only one of the Bavarian Gaue to incorporate more than one Regierungsbezirk, covering three of them.

Hans Schemm led the Gau until his death in a plane accident in 1935; his successor, Fritz Wächtler, could not muster the same popularity with the population of the region. After the occupation of Czechoslovakia, parts of this country were incorporated in the Gau. The districts (German: Kreis) of Bergreichenstein, Markt Eisenstein and Prachatitz were added to the Gau. From 1938, the Gau was also home to the Flossenbürg concentration camp and its many subcamps. Because the Gau Bayerische Ostmark was not a border region any more, it was renamed Gau Bayreuth in June 1942. Wächtler was shot on orders of Hitler, having left his capital Bayreuth in April 1945. He was replaced by Ludwig Ruckdeschel, whose reign until the surrender of Nazi Germany was very brief.

== Gauleiter ==
The Gauleiter of Gau Bayreuth:

- Hans Schemm – 19 January 1933 to 5 March 1935
- Fritz Wächtler – 5 December 1935 to 19 April 1945
- Ludwig Ruckdeschel – 19 April 1945 to 8 May 1945

Ludwig Ruckdeschel was the deputy Gauleiter from 1 February 1933 to June 1941. In this position, he led the Gau in an acting position from Hans Schemm's death to the appointment of Fritz Wächtler in 1935. After Wächtler's execution for defeatism by an SS squad in 1945, he became Gauleiter himself.
