= Fritz Sauckel =

German Nazi politician (1894–1946)

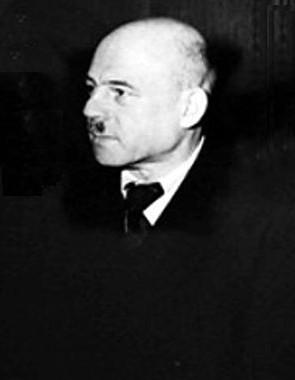
- Sauckel at the Nuremberg trials

General Plenipotentiary for Labour Deployment
- In office 21 March 1942 – 8 May 1945
- Appointed by: Adolf Hitler
- Preceded by: Position created
- Succeeded by: Position abolished

Gauleiter of Gau Thuringia
- In office 30 September 1927 – 8 May 1945
- Appointed by: Adolf Hitler
- Preceded by: Artur Dinter
- Succeeded by: Position abolished

Reichsstatthalter of Thuringia
- In office 5 May 1933 – 8 May 1945
- Prime Minister: Willy Marschler
- Preceded by: Position created
- Succeeded by: Position abolished

Minister-President of Thuringia
- In office 26 August 1932 – 8 May 1933
- Preceded by: Erwin Baum
- Succeeded by: Willy Marschler

Additional positions
- 1935—1937: Acting Reichsstatthalter of the Free State of Anhalt
- 1935–1937: Acting Reichsstatthalter of the Free State of Brunswick
- 1933—1945: Member of the Greater German Reichstag
- 1929—1934: Member of the Landtag of Thuringia

Personal details
- Born: 27 October 1894 Haßfurt, Kingdom of Bavaria, German Empire
- Died: 16 October 1946 (aged 51) Nuremberg Prison, Bavaria, Allied-occupied Germany
- Party: Nazi Party
- Spouse: Elisabeth Wetzel
- Children: 10
- Occupation: Merchant sailor
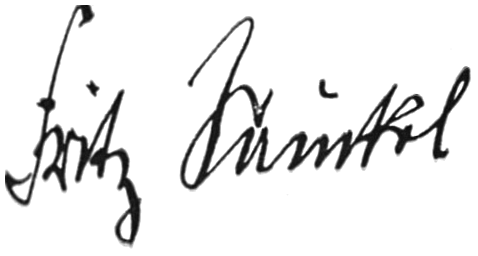
- Signature
- Criminal information
- Status: Executed by hanging
- Convictions: War crimes Crimes against humanity
- Trial: Nuremberg trials
- Penalty: Death

Ernst Friedrich Christoph Sauckel (27 October 1894 – 16 October 1946) was a German Nazi politician and convicted war criminal. As General Plenipotentiary for Labour Deployment (Arbeitseinsatz) from March 1942 until the end of the Second World War, he oversaw the mobilization of forced labour for the benefit of the German war effort.

Born in Haßfurt in Bavaria, Sauckel worked as a seaman from a young age. During the First World War, he was interned in France as an enemy alien. He joined the Nazi Party in 1923 and established himself as a leading party organiser in Thuringia. He was appointed Gauleiter of Thuringia in 1927 and, following Hitler's appointment as chancellor, Reichsstatthalter in 1933; he would retain both positions until the end of the Nazi regime.

During the Second World War, Sauckel was responsible for regional defense until 1942, when he was appointed General Plenipotentiary for Labour Deployment, working directly under Hermann Göring's Four Year Plan office. In this capacity, he deported some five million workers from occupied territories for forced labour in German industries, often by brutal coercion. In addition, he authorized the use of prisoners of war in response to ever-increasing demands.

At the end of the war, Sauckel was arrested by American troops in Salzburg. He was among the 24 major war criminals accused in the Nuremberg trials before the International Military Tribunal. He was found guilty of war crimes and crimes against humanity, sentenced to death, and executed by hanging in October 1946.

== Early years ==
Born in Haßfurt (Kingdom of Bavaria), as the only child of a postman and a seamstress, Sauckel attended the local volksschule and the gymnasium in Schweinfurt, leaving in 1909 without graduating when his mother fell ill. He joined the merchant marine of Norway and Sweden when he was 15, first on a Norwegian three-masted schooner, and later on Swedish and German vessels. Starting off as a cabin boy, he went on to sail throughout the world, rising to the rank of Vollmatrose (able seaman). At the outbreak of World War I in 1914, he was on a German vessel en route to Australia when the vessel was captured by French naval forces. He was subsequently interned as an enemy alien in France from August 1914 until 20 October 1919. While interned, he studied mathematics, languages and economics.

When released, he returned to Germany and found factory work for the next few years in Schweinfurt as an apprentice locksmith and toolmaker in the Ersten Automatischen Gußstahlkugel-Fabrik & Cie ball-bearing works. In 1919 he joined the Deutschvölkischer Schutz- und Trutzbund, the largest and most influential antisemitic organization in Weimar Germany. He served as its local manager for Lower Franconia until 1921. Moving to Thuringia, he studied engineering at a technical school in Ilmenau from 1922 to 1923, but was expelled for his political activities.

== Nazi career ==
Sauckel joined the Nazi Party (NSDAP) in January 1923 (member 1,395) and cofounded an Ortsgruppe (Local Group) in Ilmenau, serving as its Ortsgruppenführer. He also enrolled in the SA, the party’s paramilitary organization. He planned a "March on Berlin" with about 80 followers in conjunction with Adolf Hitler’s Beer Hall Putsch in Munich on 9 November 1923. However, he and 22 followers were arrested and briefly detained in Coburg before the march could get under way. Despite the forced dissolution of the party in the wake of the failed putsch, Sauckel remained politically active, establishing a right wing organization called Bund Teja, giving speeches, founding an SA front organization in Thuringia named Deutscher Wanderverein and serving as the Bezirksleiter (District Leader) for Thuringian Forest. He also became in 1924 the publisher of a small newspaper in Ilmenau, which in 1925 would merge with another paper and develop into the official organ of the Party in Thuringia, Der Nationalsozialist. Published in Weimar, he would serve as its editor from 1927 until 1945. Sauckel thus established his credentials as an Alter Kämpfer (old fighter) with whom Hitler always retained strong bonds of loyalty. In 1924 he married Elisabeth Wetzel, with whom he had ten children.

After the ban on the party was lifted, Sauckel became the business manager for Gau Thuringia under Gauleiter Artur Dinter in March 1925 and formally rejoined the party on 6 April. On 6 February 1927, he was also named Deputy Gauleiter and Gau Organisationsleiter, in charge of personnel issues. Sauckel succeeded Dinter as Gauleiter of Thuringia on 30 September 1927 and would retain this position until the end of the Nazi regime.

On 8 December 1929, Sauckel was elected to the Landtag of Thuringia as one of six Nazi deputies that would hold the balance of power there between the leftist (24) and center-right (23) parties. On 23 January 1930, a coalition government took office in Thuringia which for the first time in Germany included Nazi ministers, Wilhelm Frick and Willy Marschler. Sauckel, though not included as a State cabinet minister, became the leader of the Nazi faction in the Landtag. Following the 31 July 1932 election, the Nazis captured 42.5% of the votes and 26 seats, and Sauckel became the new Leading Minister of State (equivalent to Minister-President) as well as the interior minister from which portfolio he controlled all the State police and security apparatus.

Following Hitler's appointment as Chancellor of Germany on 30 January 1933, Sauckel was appointed to the new position of Reichsstatthalter (Reich Governor) of Thuringia on 5 May 1933, a post he would retain until May 1945. The new post was created to provide more centralized control over the State governments. On 8 May he left the Thuringian cabinet and was succeeded by Willy Marschler. On 9 November 1933, Sauckel was promoted to SA-Gruppenführer and, on 12 November, he was elected to the Reichstag from electoral constituency 12 (Thuringia), retaining this seat until the fall of the Nazi regime in May 1945.

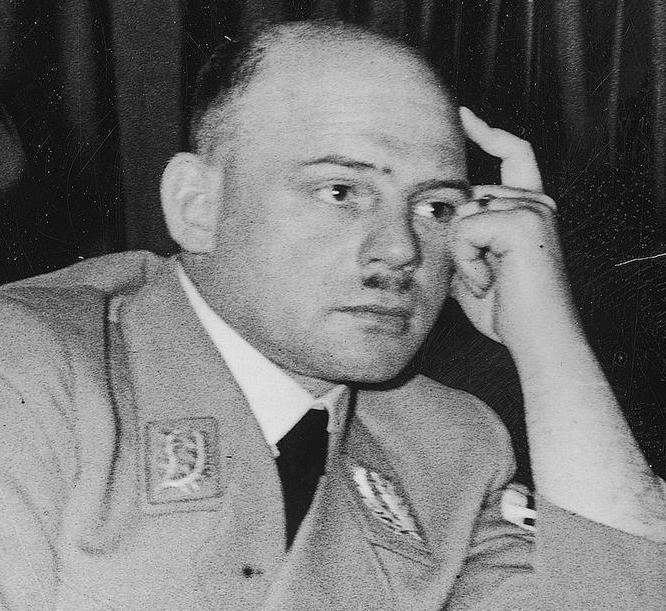
Sauckel in his Gauleiter uniform, 1937

On 9 September 1934, Sauckel joined the SS as an SS-Gruppenführer at the invitation of Heinrich Himmler and was assigned to SS-Oberabschnitt Mitte (Senior Section Central) based in Weimar until 1 April 1936 when he was transferred to the staff of the Reichsführer-SS. Upon the death of Wilhelm Friedrich Loeper Sauckel was appointed to succeed him as the acting Reichsstatthalter of both Anhalt and Brunswick from 30 November 1935 to 20 April 1937. On 23 January 1937 Sauckel was made the head of the Main Office for the Four Year Plan in Thuringia. He was also given an honorary rank of SA-Obergruppenführer on 9 November 1937.

=== World War II ===
At the start of World War II on 1 September 1939, Sauckel was named Reich Defense Commissioner (Reichsverteidigungskommissar) for Wehrkreis (Military District) IX headquartered in Kassel. This district comprised Gau Thuringia along with Gau Electoral Hesse, the eastern half of Gau Hesse-Nassau and smaller parts of four neighboring Gaue. In this position, he was entrusted with supervising civil defense measures over a large area, including air raid defenses and evacuations, as well as control over the war economy, rationing and suppression of the black market. On 16 November 1942, the jurisdiction of the Reich Defense Commissioners was changed from the Wehrkreis to the Gau level, and he remained Commissioner for only his Gau of Thuringia. A member of the SS since 1934, he was promoted to honorary SS-Obergruppenführer on 30 January 1942. He was a holder of the Golden Party Badge.

=== General Plenipotentiary for Labour Deployment ===
On 21 March 1942, Sauckel was appointed to the position for which he would be forever linked in history, General Plenipotentiary for Labour Deployment (Generalbevollmächtigter für den Arbeitseinsatz) on the recommendation of Martin Bormann.

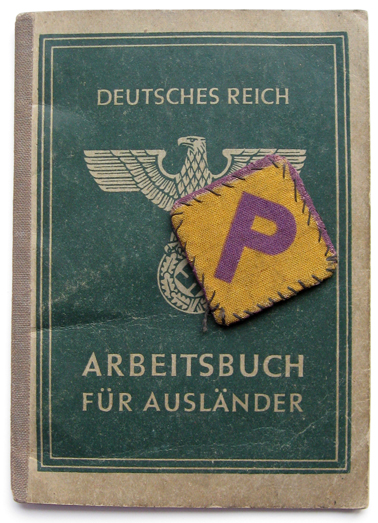
Identity document issued to a Polish forced labourer in 1942, together with a letter "P" patch that Poles were required to wear.

Sauckel worked directly under Reichsmarschall Hermann Göring within the Four Year Plan Office, obtaining and allocating labour for German industry and agriculture. On 27 March 1942, Göring issued a decree naming Sauckel the Leader of the Department of Labor Allocation within the Four Year Plan. In response to increased demands for labour from German war industries, Hitler issued a decree on 30 September 1942 granting Sauckel extraordinary powers over both civil and military authorities in the occupied territories. His agents were authorized “to issue directives to the competent military and civilian authorities” to ensure an adequate supply of labourers. Sauckel therefore met the ever-increasing requirement for manpower with people from the occupied territories. Voluntary numbers were insufficient and forced civilian labour was introduced within a few months. Of an estimated five million foreign workers brought to Germany, only around 200,000 came voluntarily, according to a March 1944 statement by Sauckel introduced as evidence at the Nuremberg trials.

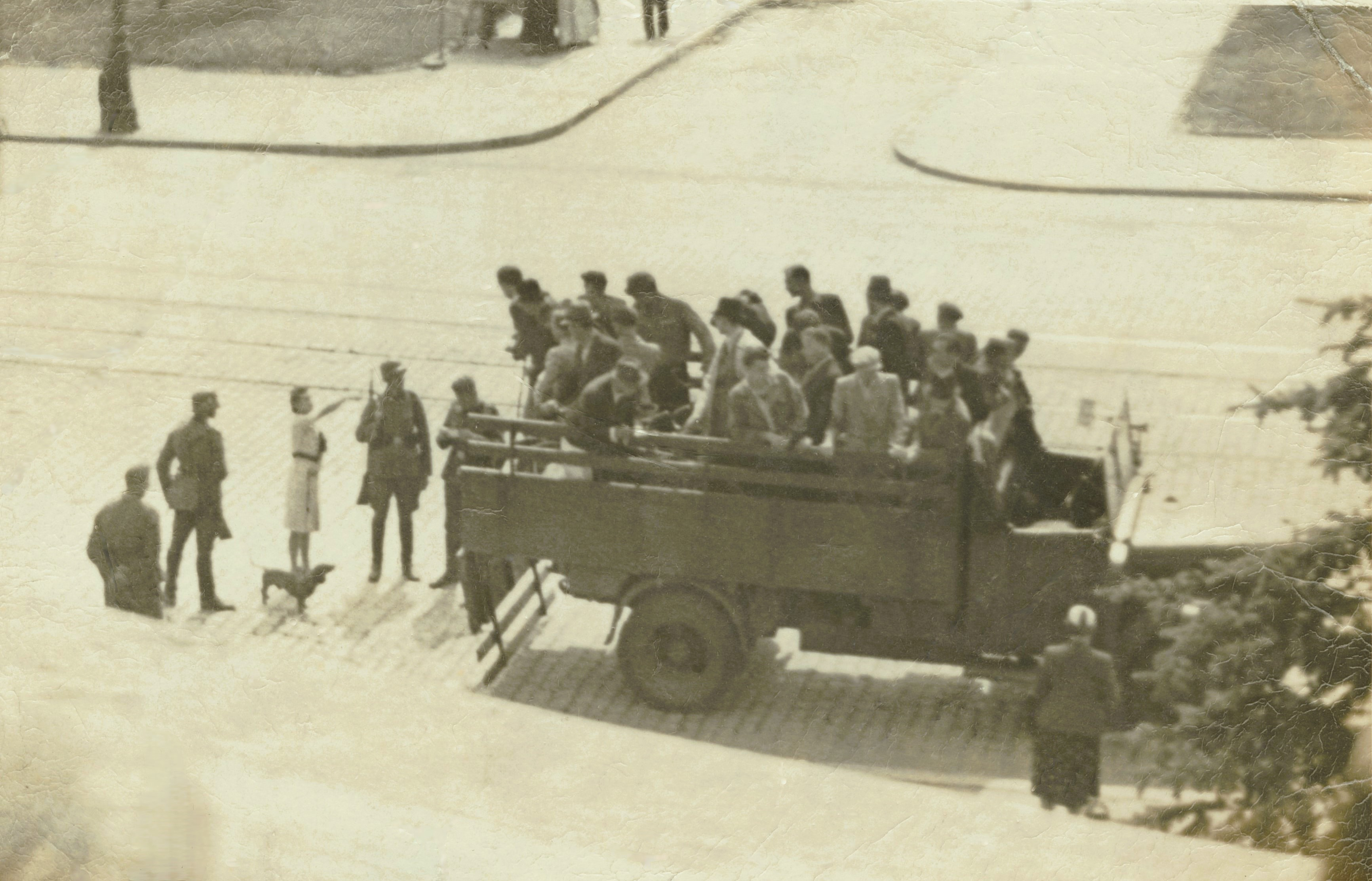
Street roundup of random civilians in Warsaw's Żoliborz district, 1941

The majority of the acquired workers originated from the Eastern territories, especially in Poland and the Soviet Union where the methods used to gain workers were very harsh. The Army was used to pressgang local people and most were taken by force to the Reich. In addition to forced civilian labourers, Sauckel authorized the use of prisoners of war. Conditions of work were extremely poor and discipline severe, especially for concentration camp prisoners. All the latter were unpaid and provided with starvation rations, barely keeping those workers alive. Such slave labour was widely used in many German industries, including coal mining, steel making, and armaments manufacture. The use of forced and slave labour continually increased throughout the war, especially after Albert Speer, the Reichsminister of Armaments and War Production, in April 1942 brought about the formation of the Central Planning Board, which determined the labor requirements of industry, agriculture and all other components of the German war economy, and requisitioned that labor through Sauckel’s office. It has been estimated that over 12 million such laborers eventually were brought forcibly to Germany to work, often by brutal coercion.

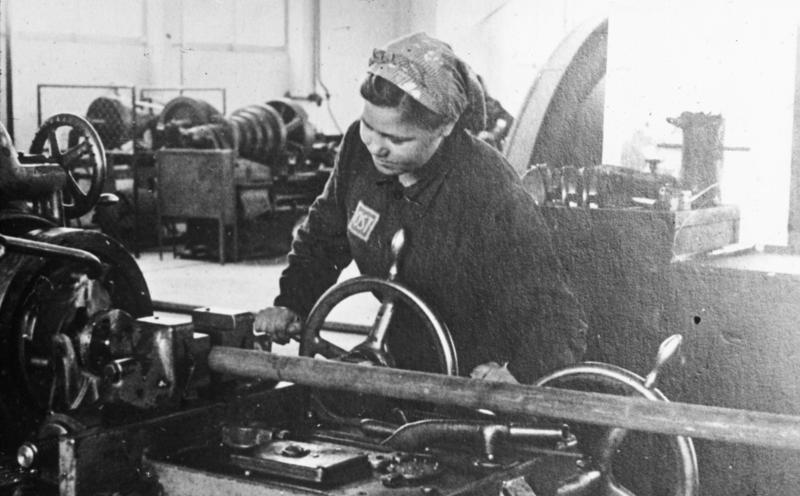
Woman with Ostarbeiter badge in Auschwitz

=== Final months of the war ===
On 1 July 1944, following the division of the Prussian Province of Saxony, Sauckel was named Oberpräsident of the Regierungsbezirk (Government District) Erfurt, which became part of Thuringia. On 25 September 1944, Sauckel was named leader of the Volkssturm forces in his Gau. On 27 October 1944 he was given a cash award of 250,000 ℛ︁ℳ︁ in honor of his 50th birthday and for his contributions to the Reich. On 10 April 1945, only a day after declaring Weimar a fortress city and exhorting his Volkssturm forces to resist the approaching American Army, Sauckel fled the city by car. After the end of the war, he was arrested in Salzburg by members of the US Army Counterintelligence Corps on 12 May 1945. He was interned in the 7th Army Interrogation Center in Augsburg, Camp King in Oberursel and, finally, in Nuremberg.

== Trial and execution ==
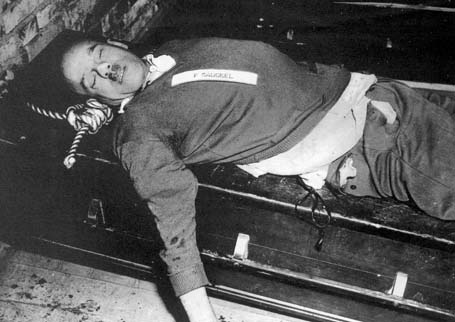
Sauckel's body after execution, October 16, 1946

On 20 November 1945, Sauckel was put on trial before the International Military Tribunal as a major war criminal. He was indicted on all four charges of conspiracy to commit crimes against peace; planning, initiating and waging wars of aggression; war crimes and crimes against humanity. He defended the Arbeitseinsatz as "nothing to do with exploitation. It is an economic process for supplying labour". He denied that it was slave labour or that it was common to deliberately work people to death (extermination by labour) or to mistreat them. Yet, documents put into evidence showed that he was complicit in exploiting the labourers:

All the men [prisoners of war and foreign civilian workers] must be fed, sheltered, and treated in such a way as to exploit them to the highest possible extent at the lowest conceivable degree of expenditure. It has always been natural for us Germans to refrain from cruelty and mean chicaneries towards the beaten enemy, even if he has proved himself the most bestial and most implacable adversary, and to treat him correctly and humanely, even when we expect useful work of him.

— Letter from Fritz Sauckel to Alfred Rosenberg, 20 April 1942, Report on Labor Mobilization Program

Robert Servatius, Sauckel's counsel, portrayed Sauckel as a representative of the labour classes of Germany; an earnest and unpretentious party man assiduously committed to promoting the collective utility of the working class. This portrait was contrary to that of Speer, whom Servatius juxtaposed against Sauckel as a technical genius and entrepreneurial administrator. Sauckel surmised that Speer bore greater legal and moral responsibility by virtue of the fact that the former merely met the demands of the latter, in accordance with protocol. This strategy did not yield to his favour, however, as the ratio in the final judgement against the respective defendants outlined that Speer's tasks were numerous, with the forced labour program comprising only one facet of his ministerial responsibilities, while Sauckel was singularly responsible for his office as General Plenipotentiary.

Sauckel was found guilty of war crimes and crimes against humanity, and was hanged at Nuremberg Prison on 16 October 1946, 11 days before his 52nd birthday after receiving Communion. His last words were recorded as "Ich sterbe unschuldig, mein Urteil ist ungerecht. Gott beschütze Deutschland. Möge es leben und eines Tages wieder groß werden. Gott beschütze meine Familie." ("I die an innocent man, my sentence is unjust. God protect Germany. May it live and one day become great again. God protect my family.") Albert Speer escaped the death sentence and served 20 years at Spandau prison, one of the most controversial verdicts of the Nuremberg trials. The discrepancy of an effective subordinate facing death with the superior facing a prison sentence has faced much attention and criticism in historical analysis, including by Gitta Sereny, who later interviewed Speer concerning his responsibility for slave labour.

Sauckel's body, as were those of the other nine executed men and the corpse of Hermann Göring, was cremated at Ostfriedhof in Munich and the ashes were scattered in the river Isar.

== Portrayal in popular culture ==
Fritz Sauckel has been portrayed by the following actors in film, television and theatre productions;

- Ken Kramer in the 2000 Canadian/U.S. T.V. production Nuremberg
- Oliver Stern in the 2005 German docudrama Speer und Er
- Paul Brennen in the 2006 British television docudrama Nuremberg: Nazis on Trial

== See also ==
- Forced labour in Germany during World War II
- Eastern worker
- List SS-Obergruppenführer
- Service du travail obligatoire
- SS Main Economic and Administrative Office

== Literature ==
- Steffen Raßloff: Fritz Sauckel. Hitler "Muster-Gauleiter" (Thüringen. Blätter zur Landeskunde 36). Erfurt 2004. (PDF) (translation into English)
- Steffen Raßloff: Fritz Sauckel. Hitlers "Muster-Gauleiter" und "Sklavenhalter" (Schriften der Landeszentrale für politische Bildung Thüringen. Bd. 29). 3. Auflage, Erfurt 2008. ISBN 978-3-937967-18-9 (PDF)

== Documentary film ==
- Thüringens Gauleiter - Fritz Sauckel (2003, 44 min, German)

== Bibliography ==
- Miller, Michael D.; Schulz, Andreas (2021). Gauleiter: The Regional Leaders of the Nazi Party and their Deputies, 1925–1945. Vol. 3. Stroud: Fonthill Media. ISBN 978-1-781-55826-3.
- Williams, Max (2017). SS Elite: The Senior Leaders of Hitler's Praetorian Guard. Oxford, England: Fonthill Media. ISBN 978-1-78155-638-2.
