= Artur Dinter =

German writer and Nazi politician (1876–1948)

Arthur Dinter
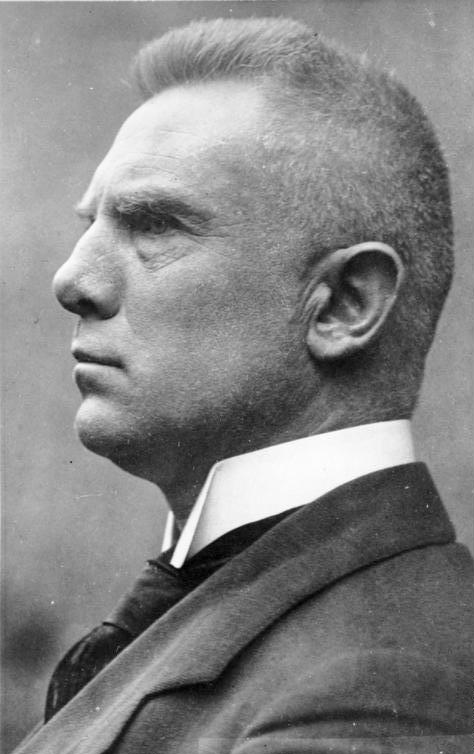

Gauleiter of Gau Thuringia
- In office 6 April 1925 – 30 September 1927
- Appointed by: Adolf Hitler
- Preceded by: Position established
- Succeeded by: Fritz Sauckel

Personal details
- Born: 27 June 1876 Mülhausen, Alsace-Lorraine, German Empire
- Died: 21 May 1948 (aged 71) Offenburg, Baden, Allied-occupied Germany
- Party: Nazi Party
- Other political affiliations: German Völkisch Freedom Party; Völkisch-Social Bloc
- Education: University of Strasbourg
- Occupation: Writer; Playwright; Theatre director

Military service
- Allegiance: German Empire
- Branch/service: Imperial German Army
- Years of service: 1914–1918
- Rank: Hauptmann
- Unit: Alsatian Infantry Regiment 136
- Battles/wars: World War I
- Awards: Iron Cross, second class

Artur Dinter (27 June 1876 – 21 May 1948) was a German writer and theater director who was a member of Pan German and antisemitic organizations. He joined the Nazi Party and became the Gauleiter of Gau Thuringia in the Party's early years. However, he fell out with Adolf Hitler, was expelled from the Party and forbidden from publishing any works. He underwent post-war denazification proceedings and was issued a fine.

== Biography ==
Dinter was born in Mülhausen, in Alsace-Lorraine, German Empire to Josef Dinter, a customs adviser, and his wife Berta, née Hoffmann, and he was baptized in the Catholic Church.

After doing his school-leaving examination, Dinter began studying natural sciences and philosophy in 1895 at the Ludwig-Maximilians-Universität München and at the University of Strasbourg. From 1901 to 1903, he worked as a chemistry assistant at the University of Strasbourg. He graduated in 1903 summa cum laude. Already while he was studying, he had been undertaking endeavours as a writer. His 1906 play Die Schmuggler ("The Smugglers") was awarded a first prize.

After graduation, Dinter was director of the botanical school garden in Strasbourg. In 1904, as a senior teacher at a German school, he went to Constantinople (Istanbul). In 1905 he switched to drama and became a theatre leader in his Alsatian homeland. From 1906 to 1908 he worked as a director at the city theatre in Rostock and the Schillertheater in Berlin, founding at the same time the Federation of German Playwrights (Verband Deutscher Bühnenschriftsteller or VDB). As director, he furthermore led the theatre publishing house from 1909 to 1914. Moreover, Dinter was a member of the antisemitic and Pan-German Alldeutscher Verband, from which he was excluded in 1917.

=== World War I ===
Dinter took part in World War I as an Oberleutnant in an Alsatian Infantry Regiment 136, and was quickly promoted to Hauptmann of the reserves and awarded the Iron Cross, second class. In 1915, he fell ill with cholera, and in 1916 he spent a great deal of time in field hospitals having suffered serious wounds, after which he was discharged from the military. During his stay in the field hospitals, Dinter became familiar with the German nationalist and mystic Houston Stewart Chamberlain's writings and became a follower of the Völkisch movement.

=== Bestselling Völkisch writer ===
In 1919, Dinter established himself as a writer in Weimar, after his 1917 antisemitic bestseller Die Sünde wider das Blut ("The Sin Against the Blood") came out, which was to sell more than 260,000 copies by 1934, and which vividly set forth the stereotypes of the racial-Völkisch perceptions of his time. Heartened as Dinter was by the great success, this novel became the first instalment in a trilogy later given the name "Die Sünden der Zeit" ("The Sins of the Time"). A short summary of the content of these books can be found in Richard Steigmann-Gall (2003), The Holy Reich, pp. 30–31.

=== Völkisch movement and the NSDAP ===
Dinter's thinking in the years after the war became steadily more radical and more racist. In 1919, he had already taken part in founding the antisemitic and Völkisch Deutschvölkischer Schutz- und Trutzbund and was in its leadership until it was banned in 1922. Thereafter, he became a founding member of the German Völkisch Freedom Party and forged closer ties with Adolf Hitler. Dinter was elected in February 1924 to the Thuringian Landtag as a representative of the electoral alliance Völkisch-Social Bloc, becoming leader of its Landtag faction. However, in a dispute with other party members, he was removed as leader in July. He drew ever nearer the Nazi Party's position, and Hitler, while still in Landsberg Prison in December 1924, appointed Dinter the Nazi Party State Leader of Thuringia. Thuringia was the only German state that had not banned the Nazi Party after the Beer Hall Putsch in Munich in 1923. At the same time, Dinter became publisher of the newspaper Der Nationalsozialist, which appeared in Weimar. He fell out with his former associates from the VSB, leading to his expulsion from that party in December 1924. In February 1925, after Hitler had been released early from prison, the Nazi Party was re-founded after having been disbanded after the débâcle in Munich. For his loyalty to the Party, Dinter received the single-digit membership number 5, when he re-enrolled in April 1925. On 6 April 1925, Hitler officially appointed him Landesleiter, later redesignated Gauleiter, of Thuringia.

=== Deutsche Volkskirche ===
It soon began to stand out quite clearly that Dinter's goals were not so much political as overridingly religious. In 1927, he founded the Geistchristliche Religionsgemeinschaft ("Spiritual Christian Religion Community"), which in 1934 was given the new name "Deutsche Volkskirche" (German People's Church). Its goal was to "de-Judaicize" Christian teaching. The Old Testament was dismissed as Jewish. Dinter's special course promptly led to conflict with Hitler. Dinter's views that Nazism should lead a religious reformation were increasingly unpopular in the Party, and jeopardized the religious neutrality that Hitler cultivated. On 30 September 1927, Hitler removed Dinter as Gauleiter and replaced him with Fritz Sauckel. Dinter was deeply shocked but increased his opposition, and started attacking Hitler in his magazine Das Geistchristentum. At a membership meeting on 2 August 1928, Dinter called for establishing a Party Senate to advise Hitler on all major policy issues. Hitler forcefully opposed the resolution, claiming sole leadership authority. Amid a chorus of boos, the proposal was unanimously defeated. Dinter persisted, refusing to accede to Hitler's sole authority and continued his written attacks. This led to his formal expulsion from the Party on 11 October 1928. Even in the years that followed, the polemics against Hitler continued. In 1932, he became the NSDAP's electoral rival, along with his "Dinterbund".

=== Later life ===
After the Nazis gained power in 1933, Dinter attempted to re-join the NSDAP in April. He was rebuffed and the Gestapo intensified its surveillance of him throughout the 1930s and even arrested him for a short while. Heinrich Himmler banned Dinter's "Deutsche Volkskirche" in 1937. Two years later, the Reich Chamber of Literature expelled Dinter, effectively banning him from publishing anything, as one had to be a member to do so. In 1942, he was brought before a special court (Sondergericht) in Freiburg im Breisgau to be tried for violating the ban on public writing. In 1945, he was sentenced by a denazification court in Offenburg to a fine of 1000 Reichsmark for his antisemitic writings, which the court ruled helped provide the intellectual basis for the 1935 Nuremberg Laws.

Dinter died in 1948 in Offenburg, Baden at the age of 71.

== Quotation ==
"Ein Körper ist ja nur das Instrument, auf dem die Seele spielt."
"A body is only the instrument on which the soul plays."

(Artur Dinter in Die Sünde wider das Blut, 1917)

== Selected works ==
- Jugenddrängen. Briefe und Tagebuchblätter eines Jünglings, 1897
- Der Dämon, Schauspiel in fünf Akten, 1906
- Das eiserne Kreuz. Volksstück in 5 Akten, 1913
- Weltkrieg und Schaubühne, 1916
- Mein Ausschluß aus dem "Verbande Deutscher Bühnenschriftsteller", 1917
- Lichststrahlen aus dem Talmud, 1919
- Die Sünden der Zeit (Trilogie)
  - Bd. I: Die Sünde wider das Blut. Ein Zeitroman, 1917
  - Bd. II: Die Sünde wider den Geist. Ein Zeitroman, 1920
  - Bd. III: Die Sünde wider die Liebe. Ein Zeitroman, 1922
- Der Kampf um die Geistlehre, 1921
- Das Evangelium unseres Herrn und Heilandes Jesus Christus, nach den Berichten des Johannes, Markus, Lukas und Matthäus im Geiste der Wahrheit, 1923
- Völkische Programm-Rede im Thüringer Landtag, 1924
- Ursprung, Ziel und Weg der deutschvölkischen Freiheitsbewegung. Das völkisch-soziale Programm, 1924
- 197 Thesen zur Vollendung der Reformation. Die Wiederherstellung der reinen Heilandslehre, 1924

== Literature ==
- H. Ahrens: Wir klagen an den ehemaligen Parteigenossen Nr. 5 Artur Dinter, Gauleiter der NSDAP in Thüringen. In: Aufbau 3 (1947) S. 288–290.
- Hans Beck: Artur Dinters Geistchristentum. Der Versuch einer "artgemäßen" Umgestaltung" des Wortes Gottes. Berlin-Steglitz: Evang. Preßverband für Deutschland 1935.
- Hans Buchheim: Glaubenskrise im Dritten Reich. Drei Kapitel nationalsozialistischer Religionspolitik. Stuttgart: Dt. Verl.-Anstalt 1953.
- Kurt Meier: Die Deutschen Christen. Das Bild einer Bewegung im Kirchenkampf des Dritten Reiches. Göttingen: Vandenhoeck u. Ruprecht 1964.
- Kurt Meier: Kreuz und Hakenkreuz. Die evangelische Kirche im Dritten Reich. München: dtv 1992. (= dtv; 4590; Wissenschaft) ISBN 3-423-04590-6
- Paul Weyland: Die Sünde wider den gesunden Menschenverstand. Eine Auseinandersetzung mit Artur Dinter. Berlin: Selbstverl. 1921.
- Artur Sünder: Die Dinte wider das Blut. 39., wildgewordene und vermasselte Aufl., 640.-683. Ts. vielm. verb. u. verm. Aufl., 11. – 20. Ts. Hannover u.a.: Steegemann 1921. (This little book with its 39 pages is a witty send-up of Dinter's "Sünde wider das Blut". The writer is actually Hans Reimann, and his parody has of course not sold about 683,000 copies.)
- Gauleiter: The Regional Leaders Of The Nazi Party And Their Deputies, 1925–1945 (Herbert Albrecht-H. Wilhelm Huttmann)-Volume 1 by Michael D. Miller and Andreas Schulz R. James Bender Publishing, 2012.
