= National Socialist Teachers League =

Organization for Socialist teacher training

- Nationalsozialistischer Lehrerbund
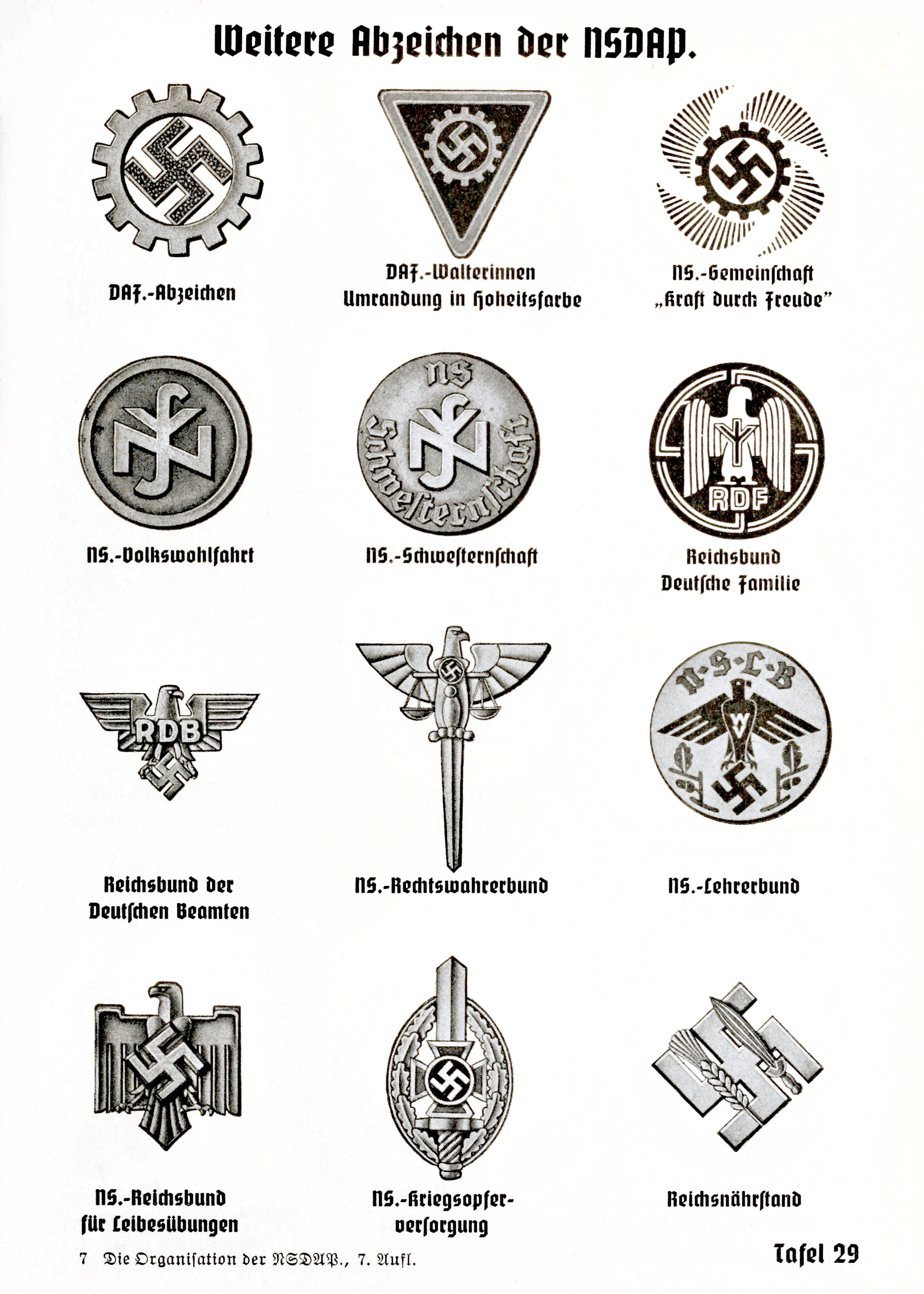
- Founded: 21 April 1929
- Dissolved: 1943
- Key people: Hans Schemm, Fritz Wächtler
- Affiliations: Nazi Party

The National Socialist Teachers League (German: Nationalsozialistischer Lehrerbund, NSLB) was a trade union, established on 21 April 1929. Its original name was the Organization of National Socialist Educators. Its founder and first leader was former schoolteacher Hans Schemm, the Gauleiter of Bayreuth. The organization was based in Bayreuth at the House of German Education. On October 27, 1938, the NSLB opened its own Realschule for teacher training in Bayreuth.

After Schemm's death in 1935, the new leader, or Reichswalter, was Fritz Wächtler.

This organization saw itself as "the common effort of all persons who saw themselves as teachers or wanted to be seen as educators, independently from background or education and from the type of educational institution". Its goal was to make the Nazi worldview and foundation of all education and especially of schooling. In order to achieve this it sought to have an effect on the political viewpoint of educators, insisting on the further development of their spirit along Nazi lines. Organized mountain excursions in places called Reichsaustauschlager (Exchange Camps of the Reich) were perceived as helping in this purpose.

The organization was dissolved in 1943 by the financial administration of the NSDAP.

== See also ==
- J. Hans D. Jensen
- Otto Friedrich Ranke
