= Hans Schemm =

German Nazi Party official (1891–1935)

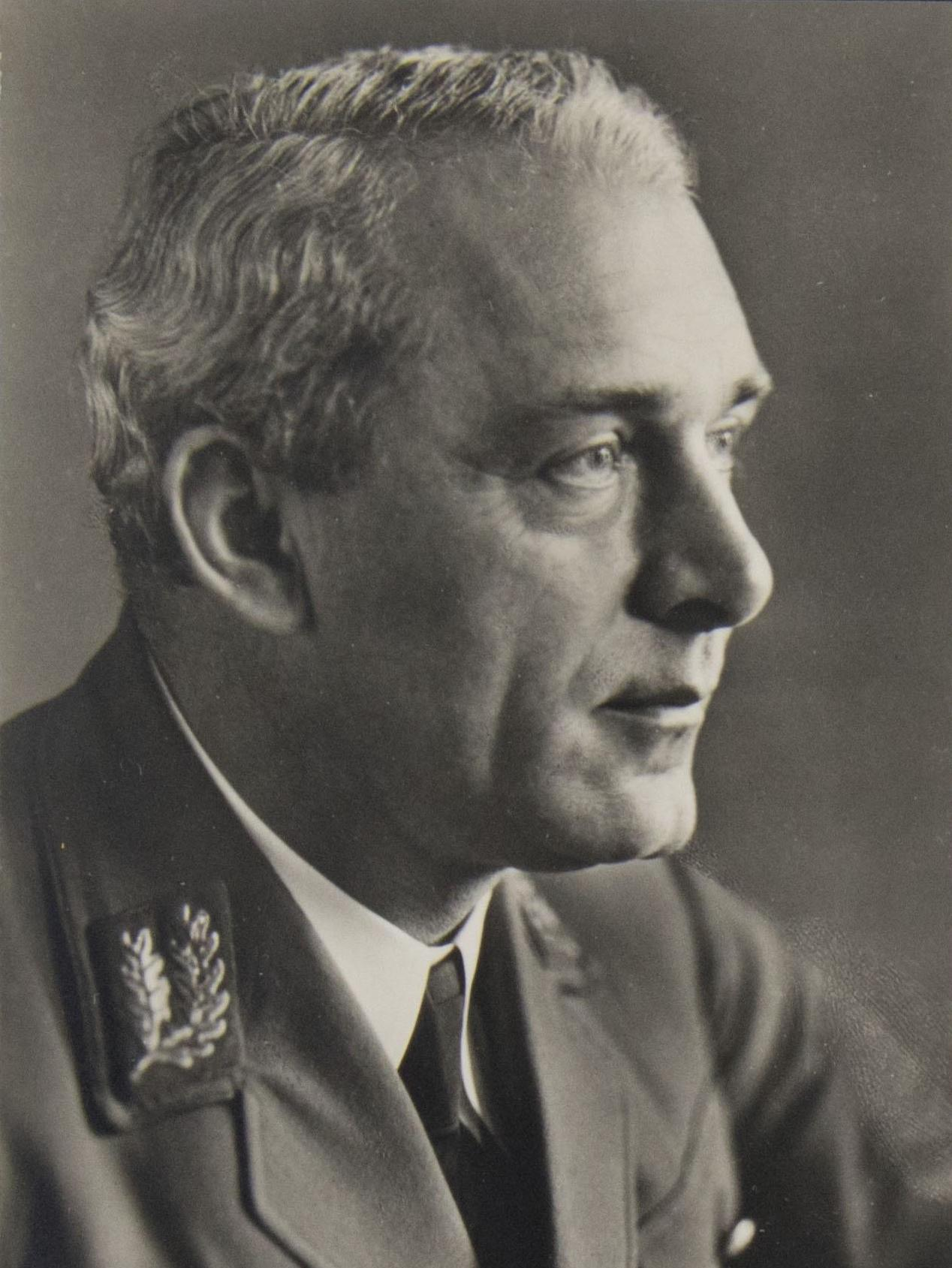
- 1933 portrait

Gauleiter of Gau Bavarian Eastern March
- In office 19 January 1933 – 5 March 1935
- Appointed by: Adolf Hitler
- Preceded by: Position established
- Succeeded by: Ludwig Ruckdeschel (Acting)

Gauleiter of Gau Upper Franconia
- In office 1 October 1928 – 19 January 1933
- Appointed by: Adolf Hitler
- Preceded by: Position established
- Succeeded by: Position abolished

Head of the National Socialist Teachers League
- In office 21 April 1929 – 5 March 1935
- Preceded by: Position established
- Succeeded by: Fritz Wachtler

Bavarian State Minister for Education and Culture
- In office 16 March 1933 – 5 March 1935
- Appointed by: Franz Ritter von Epp
- Prime Minister: Ludwig Siebert
- Preceded by: Franz Xaver Goldenberger
- Succeeded by: Adolf Wagner

Personal details
- Born: Hans Heinrich Georg Schemm; 6 October 1891 Bayreuth, Kingdom of Bavaria, German Empire
- Died: 5 March 1935 (aged 43) Bayreuth, Bavaria, Nazi Germany
- Party: Nazi Party
- Other political affiliations: National Socialist Freedom Movement
- Profession: Teacher

Military service
- Allegiance: German Empire
- Branch/service: Imperial German Army
- Years of service: 1914–1916
- Unit: Medical Corps
- Battles/wars: World War I

Hans Schemm (6 October 1891 – 5 March 1935) was a German educator who became a prominent Nazi Party official. He served as Gauleiter of Gau Bayreuth and Bavarian State Minister for Education and Culture until his death in an airplane accident.

== Early life ==
Schemm was born on 6 October 1891 in Bayreuth. His parents ran a shoemaker's shop. Schemm attended volksschule for five years and then a teacher training preparatory school. From 1908 to 1910, he attended the Royal Bavarian Teachers' Seminar, a teachers' college in Altdorf bei Nürnberg. He taught school beginning in 1910, first in Wülfersreuth, then as of 1911 in Neufang. Schemm would get married in 1915, and he had a son in 1917.

When the First World War broke out, Schemm was drafted and served as a medical attendant at a military epidemic hospital in Bayreuth. There he became infected with tuberculosis and, consequently, was discharged from military service on 26 August 1916. He returned to his teaching job in Neufang. In 1919, he was a member of the Freikorps Bayreuth, which took part in the suppression of the short-lived Bavarian Soviet Republic in Munich. On the basis of his background in bio-chemistry, Schemm became head of a bacteriological-chemical laboratory (Sanitorium Hubertusbad) in Thale. After it closed in 1921 for financial reasons, Schemm returned to the classroom as a volkschule teacher at the Altstadtschule ("Old Town School") in Bayreuth, which after his death was named the Hans-Schemm-Schule.

== Nazi Party career ==
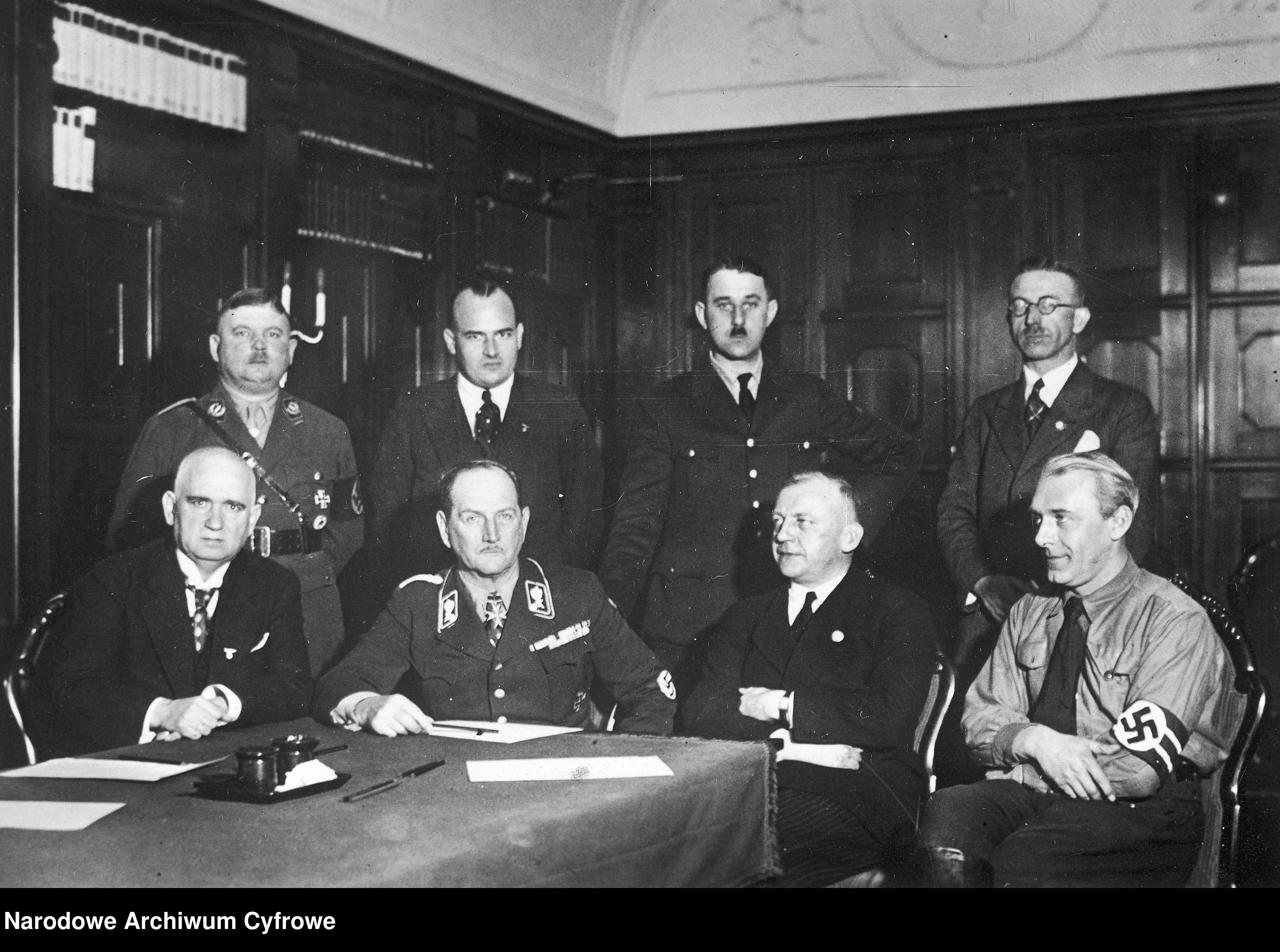
Schemm (bottom right) among the members of the Bavarian Commissarial Government

Schemm had joined the Nazi Party in 1922. On 30 September 1923, he first met Adolf Hitler. When the Party was banned in the wake of the Beer Hall Putsch, Schemm, with Hitler's blessing, became First Assessor in the Bayreuth Völkischer Bund in 1924 and, when it disbanded, joined the National Socialist Freedom Movement. When the Nazi Party was re-established in 1925, Schemm immediately rejoined it on 27 February (membership number 29,313) and organized the Bayreuth Ortsgruppe (Local Group), becoming its Ortsgruppenleiter, a post he would retain until his death. In May 1927 he advanced to Bezirksleiter (District Leader) in Upper Franconia. A gifter speaker, he became an effective propagandist and served as a Reichsredner (national orator). During that time, a very close personal rivalry developed with Friedrich Puchta, an SPD member and Bayreuth's representative in the Reichstag.

On 20 May 1928, Schemm was elected a member of the Bavarian Landtag, serving until September 1930. On 1 October 1928, when Julius Streicher’s large Gau of Northern Bavaria (Nordbayern) was broken up, Schemm became the Gauleiter of the newly established Gau of Upper Franconia (Oberfranken). On 24 November 1928, Schemm co-founded the National Socialist Teachers League (NSLB) in Hof and was elected its leader ("Reichswalter") on 21 April 1929.

Schemm also took on the role of Nazi Party publicist. Between 1928 and 1929, he was the editor of several Nazi newspapers (Der Streiter, Weckruf and Nationale Zeitung). In August 1929, Schemm founded his own newspaper, the Nationalsozialistische Lehrerzeitung ("National Socialist Teachers' Newspaper"), which became the journalistic organ of the NSLB. On 1 October 1930 came the first edition of the weekly newspaper Kampf für deutsche Freiheit und Kultur ("Struggle for German Freedom and Culture"), which was published by Schemm, and whose circulation rose from 3,000 in the beginning to 20,000 by 1932. In July 1931, Schemm founded the Bayreuth National Socialist Cultural Publishing House (Nationalsozialistischer Kulturverlag Bayreuth), which, beginning on 1 October 1932, published the daily newspaper Das Fränkische Volk (circulation: 10,000).

On 8 December 1929, Schemm became a member of the Bayreuth Stadrat (City Council) and chairman of its Nazi faction. In September 1930, he was elected as a deputy to the national parliament, the Reichstag, from electoral constituency 26 (Franconia) and retained this seat until his death. On 19 January 1933, the Gau of Upper Franconia, led by Schemm, was merged with the Gau of Lower Bavaria-Upper Palatinate (Niederbayern-Oberpfalz) to form the Gau Bavarian Eastern March. Schemm became the Gauleiter of the enlarged Gau.

On 10 March 1933, when the Nazis seized control of the Bavarian state government, Schemm was made the Staatskommissar (State Commissioner) in charge of education and culture, and also was appointed one of the state's representatives to the Reichsrat until its abolition on 14 February 1934.

After Schemm's arch-enemy Friedrich Puchta was taken into "protective custody" on the night of 9/10 March 1933, like many other political opponents of the National Socialists throughout Germany, Schemm personally delivered him to Sankt Georgen prison on 10 March. When Puchta was transferred to Dachau concentration camp on 24 April, Schemm made sure that Puchta was placed in the dreaded Barrack VII, which was considered a penal camp.

On 16 March 1933, the Reichsstatthalter (Reich Governor) of Bavaria, Franz Ritter von Epp, appointed Schemm as the Acting State Minister for Education and Culture. On 12 April, he was made permanent minister and "Leader of Cultural and Educational Affairs of Bavaria" in the cabinet of Minister-President Ludwig Siebert. At the same time, he officially left school service. In October 1933, Schemm became a member of the Academy for German Law. He was a holder of the Golden Party Badge and was also granted honorary citizenship of Bayreuth. On 17 November 1933, he became head of the Office for the NSLB within the leadership of the Nazi Party. On 1 April 1934, Schemm was named head (Hauptamtsleiter) of the Main Office for Education at the Brown House, the national headquarters of the NSDAP.

Schemm has been described as "perhaps the most skilled and dynamic of Franconia's Nazi leaders." However, his political positions were clearly anti-democratic, antisemitic and anti-communist, as can be seen in some of his quotations:

- "We are not objective – we are German!"
- " ... that a Jew should dangle from every lamppost."

In April 1933, when Schemm arrived in Passau to attend the laying of the corner stone for the Hall of the Nibelungs, he addressed the masses. Passau honored Schemm by dedicating a street and a school to him.

== Death ==
On 5 March 1935, Schemm was seriously injured in an aircraft crash. Although Hitler personally ordered noted surgeon Professor Ferdinand Sauerbruch to fly to Bayreuth, Schemm died of his injuries that same day before the professor's arrival. He was succeeded by his Deputy, Ludwig Ruckdeschel, as Acting Gauleiter until Fritz Wächtler was appointed the permanent replacement on 5 December. He was given a lavish state funeral, attended by Hitler and most Party and State dignitaries. One observer noted:

[It] was the biggest Bayreuth had ever seen and far more ostentatious than Richard Wagner's. When all the guests had taken their places, for the funeral ceremony, Hitler arrived unexpectedly, and walked silently between the ranks of the raised arms. ... Hess delivered the main funeral oration, followed by Goebbels, Frick, Frank, Rosenberg, Himmler and many others. The ceremony concluded with the funeral march from the Twilight of the Gods.

The Nazis posthumously honored Schemm as a publicist and educator by naming multiple schools, streets, and halls after him.

== Works ==
- Der rote Krieg. Mutter oder Genossin, 1931
- Gott, Rasse und Kultur, 1933
- Unsere Religion heisst Christus, unsere Politik heisst Deutschland!, 1933
