= Berg, Upper Franconia =

Berg
- Municipality
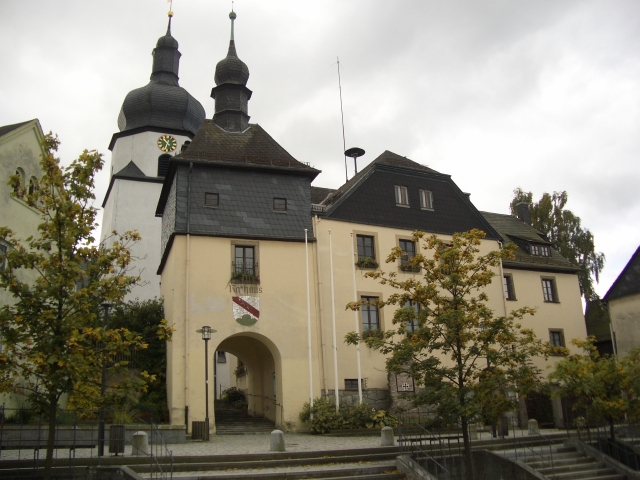
- Town hall and the Church of Saint James

- Coat of arms

- Location of Berg within Hof district
- Interactive map of Berg
- Location within Germany Location within Bavaria
- Coordinates: 50°22′N 11°46′E
- Country: Germany
- State: Bavaria
- Admin. region: Oberfranken
- District: Hof
- Subdivisions: 25 Ortsteile

Government
  - Mayor (2020–26): Patricia Rubner (CSU)

Area
  - Total: 38.9 km^{2} (15.0 sq mi)
- Elevation: 636 m (2,087 ft)

Population (2025-12-31)
  - Total: 1,951
  - Density: 50.2/km^{2} (130/sq mi)
- Time zone: UTC+01:00 (CET)
  - Summer (DST): UTC+02:00 (CEST)
- Postal codes: 95180
- Dialling codes: 09293
- Vehicle registration: HO
- Website: www.gemeindeberg.de

Berg (German pronunciation: [bɛʁk]) is a municipality in the district of Hof in Bavaria, Germany.

== History ==
Between 1966 and 1990, Berg's component village Rudolphstein served as the West German inner German border crossing for cars travelling between the East German Democratic Republic, or West Berlin and the West German Federal Republic of Germany. Traffic was subject to the Interzonal traffic regulations that followed the special regulations of the Transit Agreement (1972) made between West Germany and West Berlin
