= Wegscheid =

- Municipality
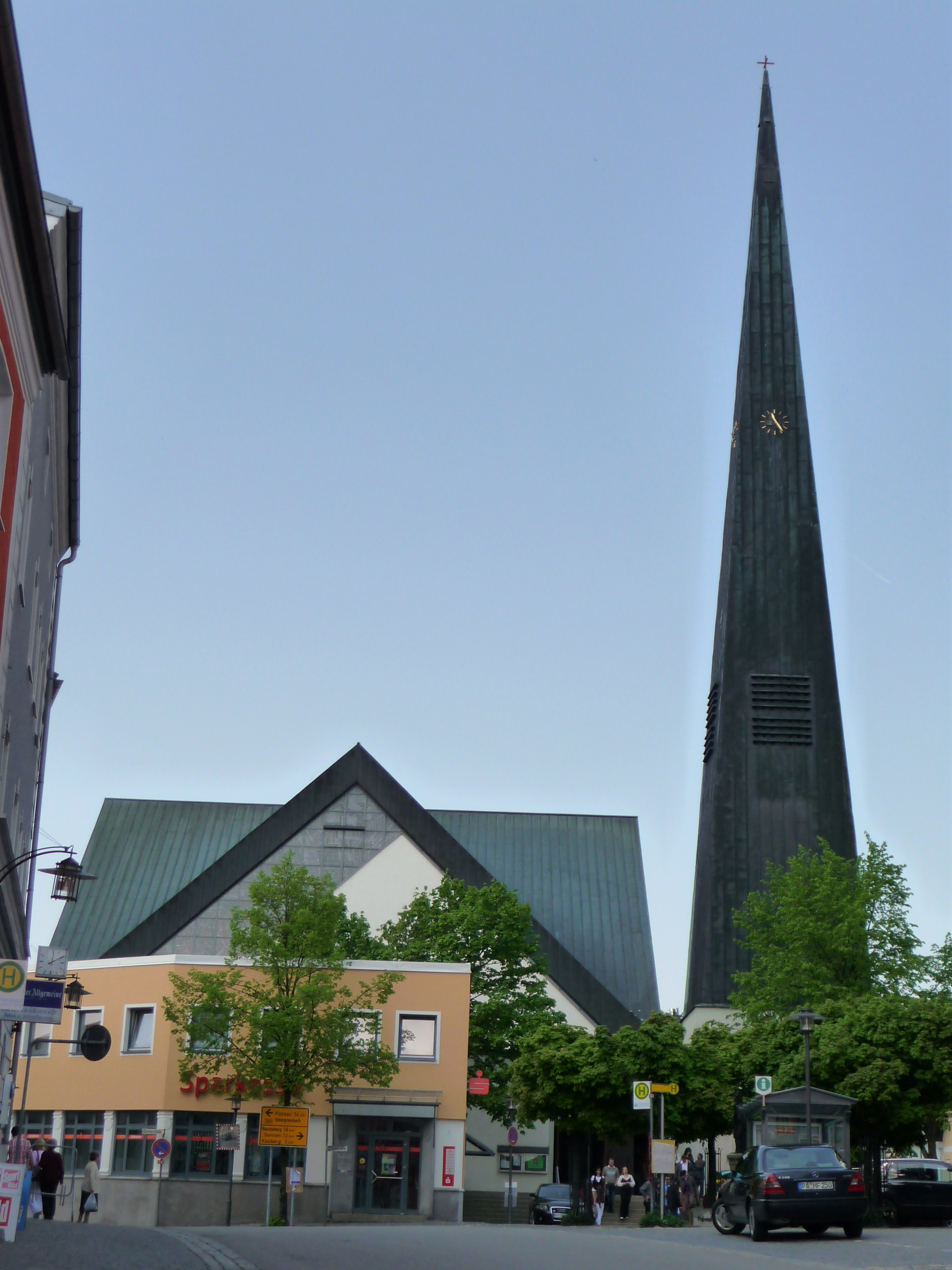
- Saint John the Baptist Church

- Coat of arms

- Location of Wegscheid within Passau district
- Interactive map of Wegscheid
- Location within Germany Location within Bavaria
- Coordinates: 48°36′N 13°47′E
- Country: Germany
- State: Bavaria
- Admin. region: Niederbayern
- District: Passau

Government
  - Mayor (2023–29): Christian Escherich (CSU)

Area
  - Total: 80.65 km^{2} (31.14 sq mi)
- Elevation: 718 m (2,356 ft)

Population (2025-12-31)
  - Total: 5,361
  - Density: 66.47/km^{2} (172.2/sq mi)
- Time zone: UTC+01:00 (CET)
  - Summer (DST): UTC+02:00 (CEST)
- Postal codes: 94110
- Dialling codes: 08592
- Vehicle registration: PA
- Website: www.wegscheid.de

Wegscheid (German pronunciation: [ˈveːkʃaɪt]) is a municipality in the district of Passau in Bavaria in Germany.

In November 1936, Fritz Wächtler visited the school.

In January 1939, when the Adalbert-Stifter school was dedicated, Kreisleiter Krenn joined the guests of honor.
