= Reich Defense Commissioner =

Government position in Nazi Germany

Reich Defense Commissioner (German: Reichsverteidigungskommissar, RVK) was a governmental position created in Nazi Germany at the outbreak of World War II on 1 September 1939. Charged with overall defense of the territory of the German Reich, there was originally one Reich Defense Commissioner for each of 15 Wehrkreise (Military Districts). On 16 November 1942, the geographical scope was reduced to the Gau level, raising the number of Reich Defense Commissioners to 42.

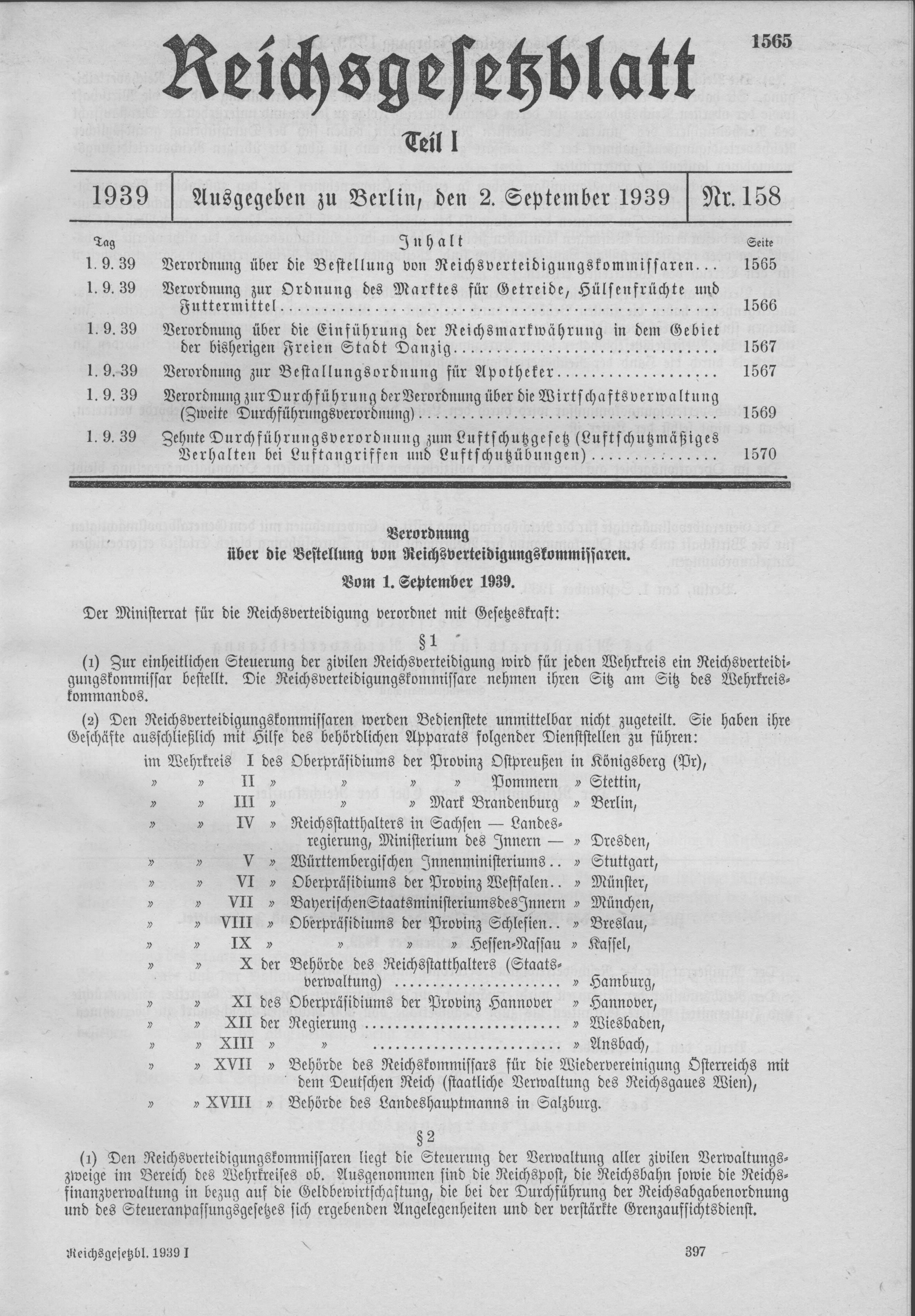
Decree of 1 September 1939

== Establishment on 1 September 1939 ==
The office of Reich Defense Commissioner was created by the “Ordinance on the Appointment of Reich Defense Commissioners” issued by the Council of Ministers for Defense of the Reich on 1 September 1939. The Reich Defense Commissioners were subordinate to this council and were under the direct supervision of the Reichsminister of the Interior, a member of the Council in his capacity as Generalbevollmächtigter für die Verwaltung (General Plenipotentiary for Administration). One Reich Defense Commissioner was appointed for each of the 15 Wehrkreise (Military Districts) that served as the headquarters of a German Army corps. Each appointee was a Gauleiter of the Nazi Party. In addition, most all held the highest governmental position in their jurisdiction, usually being either a Reichsstatthalter (Reich Governor) of a German State or an Oberpräsident (High President) of a Prussian province. (The Commissioners of the two Austrian Wehrkreis would be elevated to the rank of Reichstatthalter in April 1940.) One Commissioner, the Bavarian Interior Minister, headed the two military districts that together comprised the Free State of Bavaria.

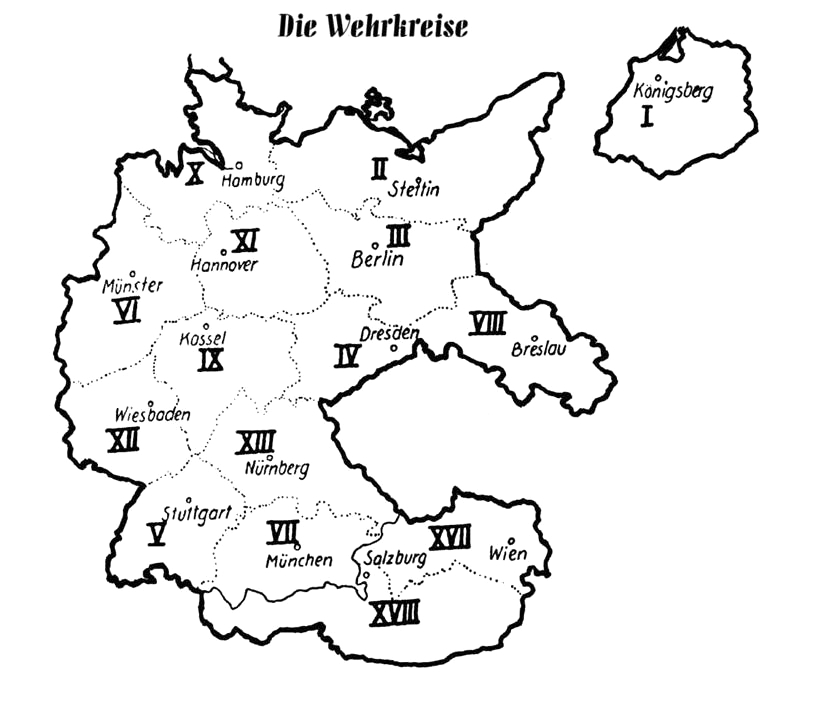
The Wehrkreise on 1 September 1939

Reich Defense Commissioners appointed on 1 September 1939:

Wehrkreis*	Reich Defense Commissioner	Gauleiter of:
I Konigsberg	Erich Koch, Oberpräsident of East Prussia	Gau East Prussia
II Stettin	Franz Schwede, Oberpräsident of Pomerania	Gau Pomerania
III Berlin	Emil Stürtz, Oberpräsident of Brandenburg	Gau Mark Brandenburg
IV Dresden	Martin Mutschmann Reichsstatthalter of Saxony	Gau Saxony
V Stuttgart	Wilhelm Murr Reichsstatthalter of Württemberg	Gau Württemberg-Hohenzollern
VI Munster	Josef Terboven, Oberpräsident of Rhine Province	Gau Essen
VII Munich	Adolf Wagner, Interior Minister of Bavaria	Gau Munich-Upper Bavaria
VIII Breslau	Josef Wagner, Oberpräsident of Silesia	Gau Silesia
IX Kassel	Fritz Sauckel, Reichsstatthalter of Thuringia	Gau Thuringia
X Hamburg	Karl Kaufmann, Reichsstatthalter of Hamburg	Gau Hamburg
XI Hanover	Rudolf Jordan, Reichsstatthalter of Anhalt and Brunswick	Gau Magdeburg-Anhalt
XII Wiesbaden	Jakob Sprenger, Reichsstatthalter of Hesse	Gau Hesse-Nassau
XIII Nurnberg	Adolf Wagner, Interior Minister of Bavaria	Gau Munich-Upper Bavaria
XVII Vienna	Josef Bürckel, Reichskommissar of Austria	Reichsgau Vienna
XVIII Salzburg	Friedrich Rainer, Landeshauptmann of the State of Salzburg	Reichsgau Salzburg

* Army motorized corps XIV, XV, XVI and XIX had no corresponding specific Wehrkreis.

All aspects of civil defense were entrusted to the Reich Defense Commissioners. They were expected to work in close coordination with the military district commanders. They were charged with management and coordination of all civil administrative agencies within their jurisdictions, and thereby had the power to issue instructions to all civil authorities in their districts in matters of defense. In the early war years this mainly involved responsibility for air raid defense preparations and for organizing the evacuation of any endangered areas. It also involved responsibilities in the area of managing the war economy, with significant control over labor deployment, exemptions from military service, housing allocation and enforcement of wartime rationing.

== Expansion of October 1939 ==
In late October 1939, after the invasion and conquest of Poland, two new Wehrkreise were formed out of the annexed Polish territory and two additional Reich Defense Commissioners were named:

Wehrkreis	Reich Defense Commissioner	Gauleiter of:
XX Danzig	Albert Forster, Reichstatthalter of Reichsgau Danzig-West Prussia	Reichsgau Danzig-West Prussia
XXI Posen	Arthur Greiser, Reichstatthalter of Reichsgau Wartheland	Reichsgau Wartheland

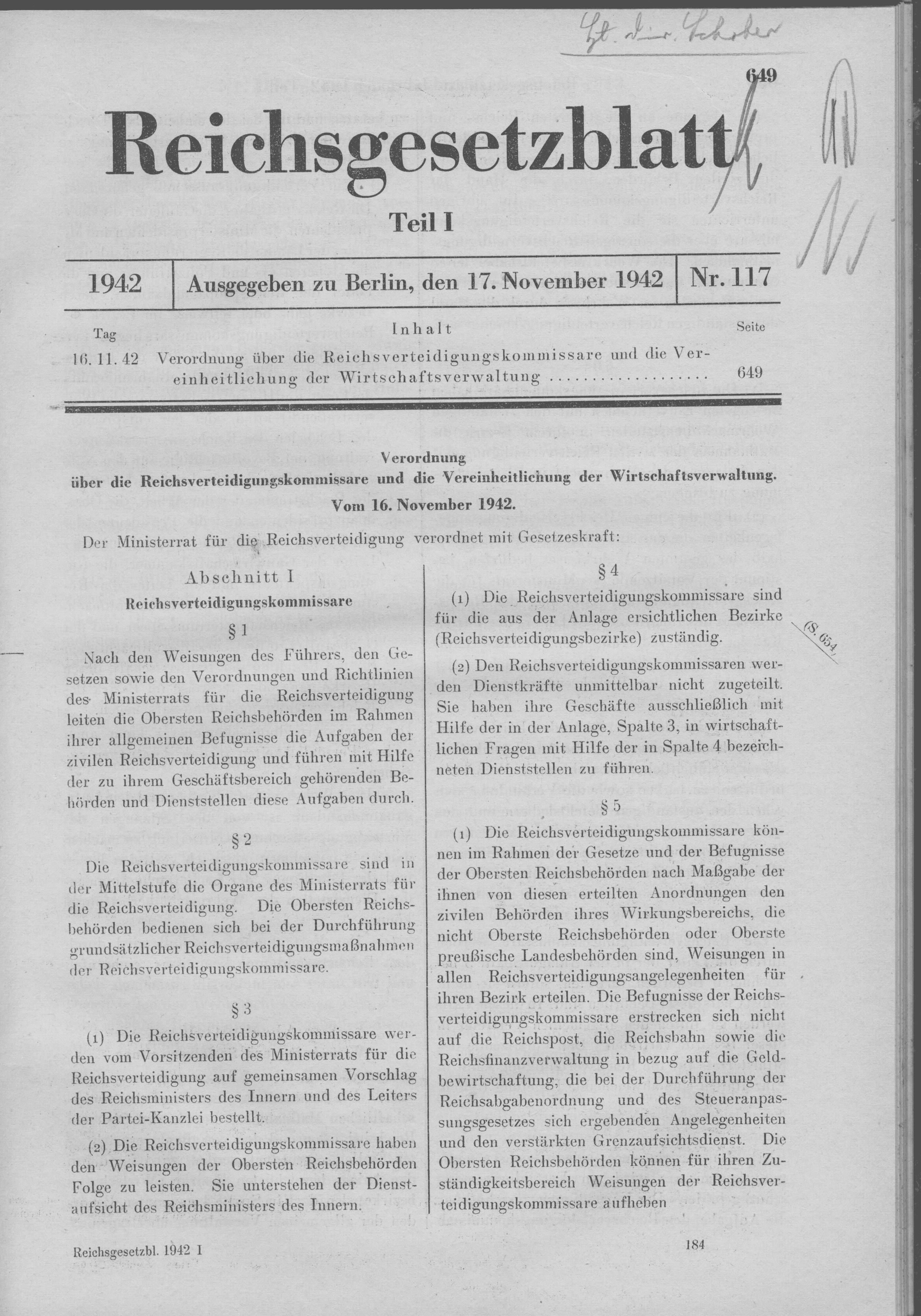
Decree of 16 November 1942

== Reorganization of 16 November 1942 ==
Because the military districts were not necessarily geographically contiguous with the various Party Gaue, German States, or Prussian provinces, conflicts with those Gauleiters and civil authorities who had not been appointed Reich Defense Commissioners often arose. In order to defuse these increasingly sharp conflicts in the course of the war, the "Ordinance on the Reich Defense Commissioners and the Unification of Economic Administration" of 16 November 1942 decreed each Party Gau to be a Reich Defense District. Each Gauleiter now was assigned the additional position of a Reich Defense Commissioner, and the cadre of 17 commissioners expanded to 42. This resulted in increased power for all Gauleiters, as economic councils and armaments commissions conformed to the new Reich Defense Districts.

== Activities in the final phase of the war ==
The autonomy and power of the Reich Defense Commissioners was increased by their involvement in the total war campaign, which Joseph Goebbels authorized on 25 July 1944 as Reich Plenipotentiary for Total War. The Reich Defense Commissioners were charged with maximizing the mobilization of all internal manpower resources by registering men and women between the ages of sixteen and sixty for war-related work assignments.

In the final phase of the war, when the territory of the Reich was invaded, the office of Reich Defense Commissioner contributed significantly to the expansion of power of the Gauleiters. In October 1944 when the Volkssturm national militia was created, its enrollment, organization and leadership was put under the direct control of the Gauleiters in their capacity as Reich Defense Commissioners.

The territorial authority of the military command extended ten kilometers behind the front line. To the rear of this line, all measures not of a purely military nature – even the construction of defensive fortifications – were under the authority of the Reich Defense Commissioners, who were responsible for carrying them out with the aid of the civilian population and the Volkssturm. In many instances the Wehrmacht attempted to intervene, while the Reich Defense Commissioners jealously guarded their prerogatives. The atmosphere between the two authorities tended to be highly strained and often contributed to conflicting and contradictory orders.

In the end, the Reich Defense Commissioners confronted dwindling manpower resources and materiel in the face of powerful offensives by the Allied powers, and were unable to significantly contribute to staving off the impending defeat. The position of Reich Defense Commissioner disappeared with the fall of the Nazi regime.

== Bibliography ==
- Broszat, Martin (1981). The Hitler State, The Foundation and Development of the Internal Structure of the Third Reich. Longman Group Ltd. ISBN 0-582-49200-9.
- Caplan, Jane (2008). Nazi Germany: Short Oxford History of Germany. Oxford University Press. ISBN 978-0199276875.
- Carruthers, Bob, ed. (2013). Götterdämmerung: The Last Days of the Wehrmacht in the East. Pen and Sword. ISBN 978-1781591369.
- Longerich, Peter (2016). Goebbels. Vintage Books. ISBN 978-0-099-52369-7.
- Miller, Michael D.; Schulz, Andreas (2012). Gauleiter: The Regional Leaders of the Nazi Party and Their Deputies, 1925-1945. Vol. I (Herbert Albrecht - H. Wilhelm Hüttmann). R. James Bender Publishing. ISBN 978-1-932970-21-0.
- Orlow, Dietrich (1973). The History of the Nazi Party: 1933-1945. University of Pittsburgh Press. ISBN 0-822-9-3253-9.
