= Gau Thuringia =

Administrative division of Nazi Germany

- Gau of Nazi Germany
- 1925–1945
- Flag Coat of arms

- Map of Nazi Germany showing its administrative subdivisions (Gaue and Reichsgaue).
- Capital: Weimar
- Government
- Gauleiter
  - 1925–1927: Artur Dinter
  - 1927–1945: Fritz Sauckel
- History
  - Establishment: 6 April 1925
  - Disestablishment: 8 May 1945
Preceded by
| Thuringia |
Succeeded by
| Thuringia |
| Bavaria |
| Saxony-Anhalt (1945–1952) |
- Today part of: Germany

The Gau Thuringia (German: Gau Thüringen) formed on 6 April 1925, was an administrative division of Nazi Germany in the State of Thuringia from 1933 to 1945. Before that, from 1925 to 1933, it was the regional subdivision of the Nazi Party in that area.

== History ==
The Nazi Gau (plural Gaue) system was originally established in a party conference on 22 May 1926, to improve administration of the party structure. From 1933 onwards, after the Nazi seizure of power, the Gaue increasingly replaced the German states as administrative subdivisions in Germany.

At the head of each Gau stood a Gauleiter, a position which became increasingly more powerful, especially after the outbreak of the Second World War, with little interference from above. Local Gauleiters often held government positions as well as party ones and were in charge of, among other things, propaganda and surveillance and, from September 1944 onward, the Volkssturm and the defense of the Gau.

The position of Gauleiter in Thuringia was originally held by Artur Dinter. On 30 September 1927 Fritz Sauckel, his Deputy Gauleiter, took over and held this position until the end of the war. Sauckel also served as the Reich General Plenipotentiary for Labor Allocation. He was convicted at the Nuremberg trials and executed for war crimes and crimes against humanity on 16 October 1946. His deputies were Hans Severus Ziegler (1927-1931), Willy Marschler (1931–32), Fritz Wächtler (1932–35) and Heinrich Siekmeier (1936–45).

The Buchenwald concentration camp was located in the Gau Thuringia. Of the 238,980 prisoners that were sent to the camp 43,045 were killed.
