= Friedrich Ringshausen =

German Nazi official (1880–1941)

Head of Ministerial Department II People's State of Hesse
- In office 1 July 1933 – 17 February 1941

Gauinspekteur, Gau Hesse-Nassau
- In office 1 January 1933 – 17 February 1941

Reichstag Deputy for Hesse-Darmstadt
- In office 14 September 1930 – 17 February 1941

Gauleiter, Gau Hesse-Darmstadt
- In office 1 March 1927 – 9 January 1931
- Preceded by: Position established
- Succeeded by: Peter Gemeinder

Personal details
- Born: 28 June 1880 Nidda, Grand Duchy of Hesse, German Empire
- Died: 17 February 1941 (aged 60) Darmstadt, Nazi Germany
- Party: Nazi Party
- Other political affiliations: German National People’s Party; Deutschvölkischer Schutz- und Trutzbund
- Profession: Schoolteacher
- Awards: Golden Party Badge

Friedrich Ringshausen (28 June 1880 – 17 February 1941) was a German school teacher who became an official of the Nazi Party (NSDAP) and served as the Gauleiter of Gau Hesse-Darmstadt, and in the state government of the People's State of Hesse. He was also a national speaker and propagandist for the Party, and was an SA-Standartenführer in the paramilitary Sturmabteilung (SA). He sat as a deputy in the Reichstag from 1930 until his death.

== Early life ==
The son of a master glazier, Ringshausen was born in Nidda on 28 June 1880. He attended the local Volksschule and the teacher training college in Friedberg from 1896 to 1899. He then entered the Hessian school service, passed his state teacher examinations in 1901, and taught at the elementary level in several Hessian towns. In 1909, he became a teacher in Offenbach am Main where he taught until 1933.

Between 1918 and 1922, Ringshausen was a member of the Deutschvölkischer Schutz- und Trutzbund, the largest, most active, and most influential antisemitic federation in Germany. From 1919 to 1923, he was a member of the German National People’s Party (DNVP), an alliance of nationalists, reactionary monarchists, Völkisch and antisemitic elements.

== Nazi career ==
In September 1923, Ringshausen joined the Nazi Party and founded an Ortsgruppe (local group) in Offenbach am Main, serving as the Ortsgruppenleiter. As an early Party member, he later would be awarded the Golden Party Badge. When the Party was banned in the aftermath of the failed Beer Hall Putsch, Ringshausen remained active as an orator and advanced to being the Kreisleiter (county leader) in the Offenbach area. After the ban on the Party was lifted, he rejoined it on 3 July 1925 (membership number 8,993). When the Party restructured its existing Gaue in the Hesse-Nassau region into three Gaue on 1 March 1927, Ringshausen was appointed the first Gauleiter of the new Gau Hesse-Darmstadt, consisting of the People's State of Hesse (comprising the provinces of Upper Hesse, Rheinhessen and Starkenburg).

On 7 November 1929, Ringshausen became a member of the Offenbach Stadtrat (city council) and also of the Starkenburg provincial Landtag and the provincial executive committee. In September 1930, he was elected as a deputy to the Reichstag from electoral constituency 33, (Hesse-Darmstadt) and retained this seat until his death. Also in that year, Ringshausen joined the National Socialist Teachers League and became its chairman in Hesse, an office he held until his death.

On 9 January 1931, Ringshausen was given a leave of absence from his Gauleiter position, and was succeeded by Peter Gemeinder. Ringshausen was posted to the Party’s Reichsleitung (national leadership) office at the Brown House in Munich. He became a Reichsredner (national speaker) and was engaged in propaganda activity. He would not return to his prior post, as Gau Hesse-Darmstadt was merged with the neighboring Gau Hesse-Nassau South on 1 January 1933 to form Gau Hesse-Nassau under Jakob Sprenger. Instead, Ringshausen became a Gauinspekteur and head of the Party's Office of Education in Gau Hesse-Nassau. He would retain these Party assignments until his death.

After the Nazi seizure of power in 1933, Ringshausen was named as a Ministerialrat (ministerial councilor) in the government of the People’s State of Hesse on 24 June. This was followed on 1 July 1933 by his appointment as the leader of Ministerial Department II in the Hessian State Ministry, where he oversaw education, culture, art and nationhood issues. He would retain this government post until his death. In November 1935, he was again named as a Reichsredner on behalf of the Nazi Auslands-Organisation. A member of the Sturmabteilung (SA), the Party's paramilitary unit, Ringshausen was assigned to SA-Brigade 50 and promoted to SA-Standartenführer on 30 January 1938.

== Death ==
Ringshausen died in Darmstadt on 17 February 1941.

== Sources ==
- Höffkes, Karl (1986). Hitlers Politische Generale. Die Gauleiter des Dritten Reiches: ein biographisches Nachschlagewerk. Tübingen: Grabert-Verlag. ISBN 3-87847-163-7.
- Miller, Michael D.; Schulz, Andreas (2017). Gauleiter: The Regional Leaders of the Nazi Party and Their Deputies, 1925-1945. Vol. II (Georg Joel – Dr. Bernhard Rust). R. James Bender Publishing. ISBN 978-1-932970-32-6.

== External websites ==
- Information about Friedrich Ringshausen in the Reichstag database
- Ringshausen, Friedrich in the Hessische Geschichte entdecken und erforschen
