= Karl Lenz =

Nazi Party official and teacher (1899–1944)

Gauleiter of Gau Hesse-Darmstadt
- In office 16 September 1931 – 15 December 1932
- Preceded by: Peter Gemeinder
- Succeeded by: Position abolished

Deputy Gauleiter of Gau Baden
- In office Autumn 1926 – August 1931
- Preceded by: Position established
- Succeeded by: Walter Köhler

Personal details
- Born: 7 July 1899 Heidelberg, Grand Duchy of Baden, German Empire
- Died: 7 November 1944 (aged 45) Freising, Bavaria, Nazi Germany
- Party: Nazi Party (NSDAP)
- Profession: Teacher

Military service
- Allegiance: German Empire; Nazi Germany
- Branch/service: Imperial German Army; German Army
- Years of service: 1916–1919; 1940
- Unit: Mecklenburg Jäger Battalion 14; Infantry Regiment 70; Reserve Infantry Regiment 221
- Battles/wars: World War I World War II
- Awards: Iron Cross, 2nd class

Karl Lenz (7 July 1899 – 7 November 1944) was a Nazi Party (NSDAP) official who served as the third and last Gauleiter of Gau Hesse-Darmstadt. He was also an officer in the Allgemeine SS and the Waffen-SS.

== Early years ==
Lenz was born in 1899 in Heidelberg to the son of a school administrator.

After attending primary and high school, he volunteered for service in World War I in November 1916 with Mecklenburg Jäger Battalion 14.

He saw action on both the Eastern Front and Western Front with Infantry Regiment 70 and Reserve Infantry Regiment 221. In October 1918 he was wounded in action, losing his left eye, and was captured by British forces. He was awarded the Iron Cross 2nd class, classified as severely war-disabled and discharged from the military in January 1919. Lenz worked for a time as an agricultural laborer and then attended teacher's college until 1920.

He worked as a teacher in the Baden State government from 1920 to 1928, however his political activities led to numerous suspensions. From 1920 to 1924 he was a member of the Freikorps and active in the League for Freedom and Justice, a right wing political organization.

== Nazi Party career ==
On 15 January 1922, Lenz joined the Nazi Party and founded the “Sturmtrupp Lenz” in Heidelberg. He headed the Sturmabteilung (SA) in Heidelberg from 1922 to 1925 and was at one time arrested and held in detention for smuggling arms and explosives. In 1922 he was selected as a Party Reichsredner (National Speaker) in Baden and was engaged in propaganda work. The Nazi Party was banned in the aftermath of the Beer Hall Putsch but when the ban was lifted, Lenz re-enrolled in April 1926 (membership number 32,388) and was made the Ortsgruppenleiter (Local group Leader) in Eichtersheim. He also became a municipal delegate there and by autumn moved up to Kreisleiter (County Leader) in Sinsheim, south of Heidelberg. Shortly thereafter, he was named Deputy Gauleiter of Gau Baden, under Robert Wagner. In the spring of 1927, Lenz was named, in addition, the Gau Propagandaleiter. He also became a writer for "Führer", the Nazi newspaper of Gau Baden published in Karlsruhe.

In November 1928 he was finally dismissed from his teaching position due to his political activities. He was then employed as a writer for the Nazi newspaper "Gau Baden der NSDAP" in Karlsruhe. In October 1929 he was elected to the Baden Landtag (State Parliament) and served for a year. In 1930 he also took on the duties of Kreisleiter in Mannheim and became publisher of "Hakenkreuzbanner" (Swastika Banner), the NSDAP news organ in that city. In September 1930, Lenz was elected to the Reichstag for electoral constituency 32 (Baden).

On 16 September 1931 following the death of Peter Gemeinder, Lenz was appointed Gauleiter of Gau Hesse-Darmstadt, which consisted of the People's State of Hesse. In December 1931, Lenz was elected to the Landtag of Hesse and in January was named the NSDAP parliamentary faction leader. At the July 1932 election, he became a Reichstag deputy for electoral constituency 33 (Hesse-Darmstadt).

Within the Party, Lenz was associated with the Gregor Strasser wing and the notgemeinschaft, a kind of internal opposition to the party leadership. He also was engaged in a power struggle with Jakob Sprenger, the Landesinspekteur whose duties included oversight of Lenz' Gau. In November 1932, Sprenger wrote a report to the Party Reichsleitung (National Leadership) demanding the ouster of Lenz as Gauleiter, alleging that he spent less time running his Gau than cultivating various sexual relationships. Just after Strasser's fall from power on 8 December 1932, Lenz was removed as Gauleiter of Hesse-Darmstadt on 15 December. His resignation was ostensibly due to health problems related to pneumonia and pleurisy but, in reality, was due to the above noted factors. On 1 January 1933, Gau Hesse-Darmstadt was officially dissolved and merged with Sprenger's Gau Hesse-Nassau South to form Gau Hesse-Nassau. By July 1933, Lenz was the subject of a proceeding in the Supreme Party Court. On 1 April 1934, he was found guilty of conduct damaging to the Party, given a formal reprimand and banned from holding political office for three years. Though not immediately removed as a Reichstag deputy, he was not allowed to stand for reelection in March 1936.

== Later years and death ==
In 1935, Lenz resettled in Munich, returned to teaching and became active as a member of the National Socialist Teachers League. In 1936 he was made a district school counselor in Viechtach. In spring 1940 he did military service on the Western Front.

In September 1941, he was allowed to join the Allgemeine SS, given the rank of SS-Sturmbannführer and assigned to the Reich Security Main Office. On 26 February 1943 he joined the Waffen-SS but remained in an administrative position in the SS Main Office in Berlin under Gottlob Berger. In March 1943, his final assignment was as the business manager for DeVlag, the Nazi organization in Flanders that was active in recruiting members for the Waffen-SS. Lenz died on 7 November 1944 in Freising, from complications following an appendectomy.

== Bibliography ==
- Höffkes, Karl (1986). Hitlers Politische Generale. Die Gauleiter des Dritten Reiches: ein biographisches Nachschlagewerk. Tübingen: Grabert-Verlag. ISBN 3-87847-163-7.
- Miller, Michael D.; Schulz, Andreas (2017). Gauleiter: The Regional Leaders of the Nazi Party and Their Deputies, 1925-1945. Vol. II (Georg Joel - Dr. Bernhard Rust). R. James Bender Publishing. ISBN 978-1-932970-32-6.
