= Ferdinand Werner =

German schoolteacher and Nazi Party politician

Professor Ferdinand Werner
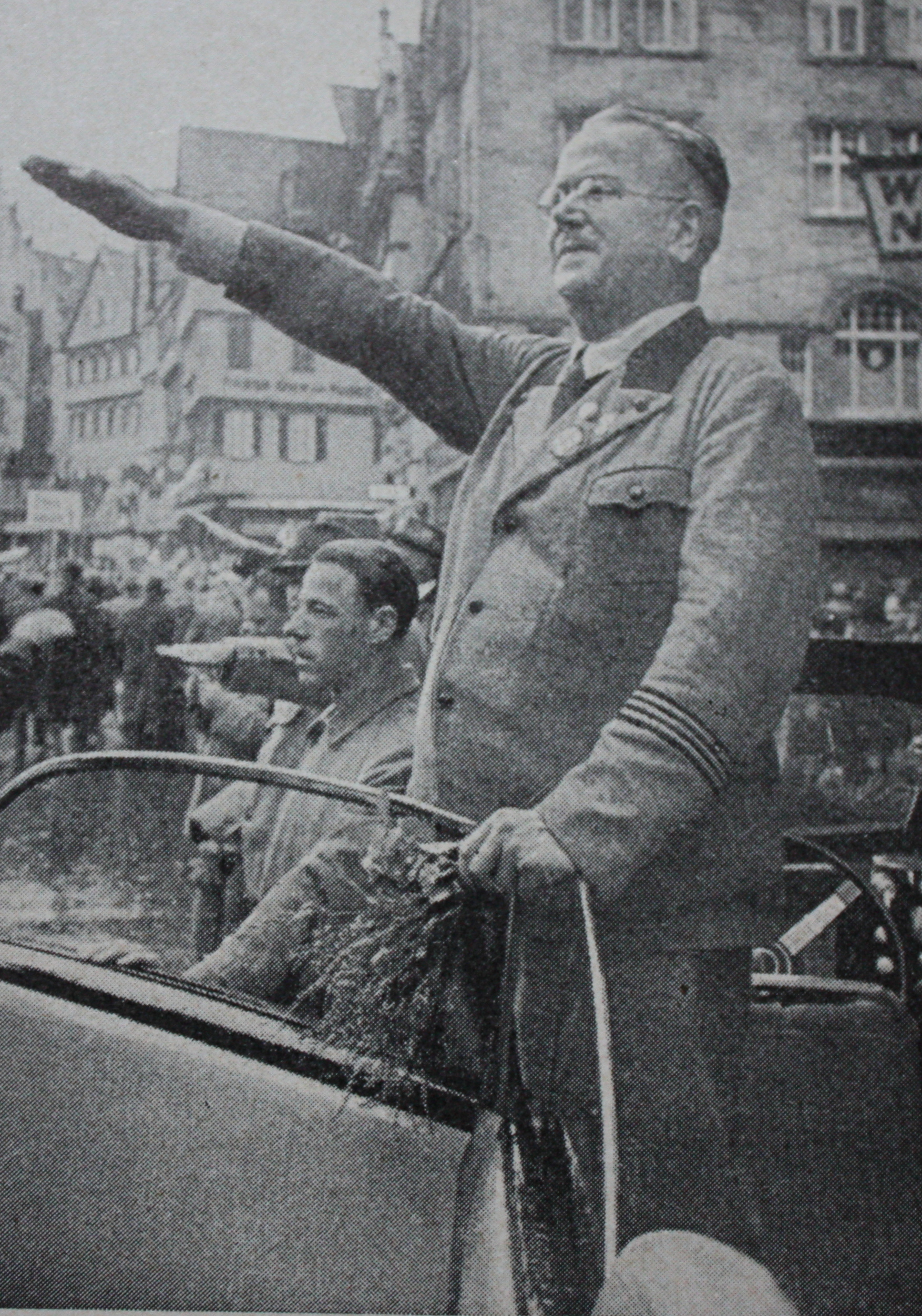
- Werner at the German Hiking Day in Stuttgart on 21 August 1938

Minister-President People's State of Hesse
- In office 15 May 1933 – 20 September 1933
- Preceded by: Position created
- Succeeded by: Philipp Wilhelm Jung

State President People's State of Hesse
- In office 13 March 1933 – 15 May 1933
- Preceded by: Bernhard Adelung
- Succeeded by: Position abolished

Landtag President People's State of Hesse
- In office 8 December 1931 – 13 March 1933

Additional positions
- 1921–1933: Hesse Landtag Deputy
- 1911–1917 1924–1928: Imperial Reichstag Deputy; Republican Reichstag Deputy

Personal details
- Born: 27 October 1876 Gladenbach, Province of Hesse-Nassau, Kingdom of Prussia, German Empire
- Died: 5 March 1961 (aged 84) Gießen, Hesse, West Germany
- Party: Nazi Party
- Other political affiliations: German Social Party; Deutschvölkische Partei; German National People's Party
- Education: University of Gießen
- Profession: Schoolteacher
- Awards: Golden Party Badge

Ferdinand Friedrich Karl Werner (27 October 1876 – 5 March 1961) was a German schoolteacher and long-serving politician who held offices during the German Empire, the Weimar Republic and Nazi Germany. Throughout his career, he belonged to several far-right and antisemitic parties. He was a deputy in the Imperial Reichstag from 1911 to 1917, and again in the Republican Reichstag from 1924 to 1928. From 1921 to 1933, he served as a deputy of the Landtag of the People's State of Hesse. In the first year of Nazi Germany he was the first Nazi Party State President and, later, Minister-president of Hesse but was dismissed in a power struggle with Reichsstatthalter (Reich Governor) Jakob Sprenger. He then worked for the Association of German Mountain and Hiking Clubs and as a Hessian state historian.

== Early life ==
Ferdinand Werner was born the son of a master locksmith in Weidenhausen, a section of Gladenbach. He attended the Realschule and the Gymnasium in Gießen. During his studies of history, and modern languages at the University of Gießen, he was a member of the German Student Association. After completion of his education, Werner entered the Hessian school service as a secondary school teacher in 1900. He became an Oberlehrer (senior teacher) in Gießen in 1905 and, after obtaining a doctorate in 1906, became an Oberlehrer in Worms. He often was transferred because of his open hostility to Jews until 1910, when he took a teaching post at the Weidigschule in Butzbach, where he taught until 1933. From 1914, he carried the title of Gymnasialprofessor. During this time he campaigned in vain against the construction of the first Heinrich-Heine monument in Germany at Frankfurt, which was eventually torn down in 1933 at his instigation.

== Entry into politics in the Wilhelmine Empire ==
Politically active from 1898, Werner's antisemitism was already evident when he joined the Pan-German League and became a member of its Jewish Committee. In 1908, Werner applied for a mandate in the Hessian state parliament for the far-right and antisemitic German Social Party (DSP) but withdrew his candidacy. In 1909, he was elected as the DSP chairman in Hesse. In 1911, he was elected to the Reichstag for the Gießen constituency in a by-election, and was reelected in the Reichstag election of 1912. He was exempted from military service during the First World War due to extreme nearsightedness. The DSP disbanded in 1914 and, from 1915, Werner was chairman of its successor organization, the German Folkish Party (Deutschvölkische Partei), also an antisemitic and Völkisch entity that started using the swastika for its party publication German Folkish Paper (Deutschvölkische Blätter) in January 1917. From July 1918, Werner briefly served as a member of the Second Chamber of the state parliament of the Grand Duchy of Hesse before its abolition following the overthrow of the House of Hesse at the end of the war. Shortly afterward, when the DvP dissolved and merged into the German National People's Party (DNVP) on 24 November 1918, Werner became a member of its six-member executive board.

== The Weimar Republic years ==
From 1919 to 1924, Werner was a member of the Butzbach Stadtrat (city council). He was elected the first chairman of the Deutschvölkischer Bund (German Völkisch League) on 30 March 1919. At the end of the year, it merged into the Deutschvölkischer Schutz- und Trutzbund, which would become the largest and most active antisemitic organization in Germany. Werner was involved in organizing its regional association in Hesse. In April 1920, he became a deputy chairman of the organization, serving until July 1922. At the Reichstag election of June 1920, he ran but failed to win a seat.

On 27 November 1921, Werner was elected as a DNVP deputy to the Landtag (state parliament) of the People's State of Hesse, where he would become the DNVP faction leader from 1924 to 1927. He would remain a Landtag deputy continuously until 1933. He was elected to the Reichstag on the DNVP party list in the elections of May and December 1924, and served until 1928.

== Nazi Party career ==
Werner left the DNVP in 1930 and joined the Nazi Party. Following the Hessian state election in November 1931, the Nazi Party became the largest party in the Landtag, though they lacked a majority of the seats. On 8 December, however, with the support of the Center Party deputies, Werner was elected as President of the Landtag. After the Nazis seized power at the national level at the end of January 1933, they instituted a policy of Gleichschaltung (coordination) by which they sought to assert their control over all the German Länder.

On 6 March 1933, armed members of the Nazi paramilitary Sturmabteilung (SA) and Schutzstaffel (SS) took control of the streets of the Hesse capital, Darmstadt. Isolated clashes with the local security police broke out as the paramilitaries raised the swastika flag over government buildings. One police squad was forcibly disarmed, and SA troops prevented the State President and the Interior Minister from leaving their homes or having any telephone communications with the outside. On 13 March 1933, the Landtag met and formally elected Werner as the State President of Hesse, replacing the Social Democrat Bernhard Adelung. At the same time, he also became Minister of Foreign Affairs and of Culture and Education. He was now at the height of his power. Hesse was one of only three states in March 1933, along with Hamburg and Württemberg, where a new Nazi government was formally and legally established by the legitimately elected parliament.

However, following passage of the Second Law on the Coordination of the States with the Reich, the post of Reichsstatthalter (Reich Governor) was created by the central government to gain additional control over the states. On 5 May, Adolf Hitler filled this post with the Nazi Party Gauleiter of Hesse-Nassau, Jakob Sprenger. On 15 May, to emphasize his primacy, Sprenger abolished the post of State President. He then appointed Werner to the subordinate position of Minister-president and, in a reduced administration, also gave him the leadership of the education, finance, interior and justice ministries. A power struggle ensued, with Werner resisting Sprenger's attempts to subordinate Hesse to Hesse-Nassau. After a dispute over the merger of their respective chambers of commerce, Sprenger dismissed Werner on 20 September 1933 and replaced him with Philipp Wilhelm Jung.

In 1936, Werner was appointed by Oberpräsident Josef Wagner as a Regierungsdirektor (government director) in Breslau (today Wrocław), where he worked as acting head of the department for higher education for the Province of Lower Silesia until 1938. Werner also held the office of president of the Verband Deutscher Gebirgs- und Wandervereine (Association of German Mountain and Hiking Clubs), from 1933 to 1942. In this position, he was a member of the Reich Leadership Council of German Sports. During Werner's tenure, he ordered the exclusion of all non-Aryans from the association's member organizations. Only Nazi Party members were permitted to be chairmen of the member clubs, and its youth groups were forcibly transferred to either the Hitler Youth or the League of German Girls. When Werner retired as president of the association in 1942, he received a pension payment and, in 1943, the Golden Party Badge. He was succeeded by Heinrich Haake, the Landeshauptmann of Prussia's Rhine Province.

== Selected works ==
- Königtum und Lehnswesen im französischen Nationalepos, Dissertation, University of Giessen, 1907
- Geschichte der französischen Literatur, Berlin, 1907
- Ein öffentliches Heinedenkmal auf deutschem Boden?, Leipzig, 1913
- Der Wahrheit eine Gasse! Eine Abrechnung mit dem Judentum und seinen Helfern, Ernst Boepple's Deutscher Volksverlag, Munich 1919
- In Sturm und Stille, Mainz 1935

== Post-war life ==
After the end of the Second World War, Werner underwent denazification proceedings in 1949 and was classified as Category III, a "lesser offender". On appeal in 1950, this was downgraded to Category IV, a "follower". Werner worked as a historian for the State of Hesse and remained a leading member of the Hessian Historical Commission in Darmstadt. He died in March 1961 at Gießen.

== Sources ==
- Broszat, Martin (1981). The Hitler State: The Foundation and Development of the Internal Structure of the Third Reich. New York: Longman Inc. ISBN 978-0-582-48997-4.
- Childers, Thomas (2017). The Third Reich: A History of Nazi Germany. New York: Simon & Schuster. ISBN 978-1-45165-113-3.
- Das Deutsche Führerlexikon 1934-1935. Berlin: Verlagsanftalt Otto Stollberg G. m. b. H. 1934.
- Ferdinand Werner Biography in the Reichstag Database
- Lohalm, Uwe (1970). Völkischer Radikalismus: Die Geschichte des Deutschvölkischen Schutz- und Trutz-Bundes. 1919–1923. Hamburg: Leibnitz-verlag. ISBN 978-3-874-73000-6.
- Miller, Michael D.; Schulz, Andreas (2021). Gauleiter: The Regional Leaders of the Nazi Party and Their Deputies, 1925–1945. Vol. 3 (Fritz Sauckel - Hans Zimmermann). Fonthill Media. ISBN 978-1-781-55826-3.
- Werner, Ferdinand entry in the Hessen Landesgeschichtliches Informations System

== Additional reading ==
- Jatho, J.P.: Dr. Ferdinand Werner. Eine biographische Skizze zur Verstrickung eines völkischen Antisemiten in den Nationalsozialismus, in: Wetterauer Geschichtsblätter 34. 1985, S. 181–224.
