= Peter Gemeinder =

German Nazi official (1891–1931)

Gauleiter of Gau Hesse-Darmstadt
- In office 9 January 1931 – 29 August 1931
- Preceded by: Friedrich Ringshausen
- Succeeded by: Karl Lenz

Reichstag Deputy for Hesse-Nassau
- In office 14 September 1930 – 29 August 1931

Personal details
- Born: 31 January 1891 Dillhausen, Province of Hesse-Nassau, Kingdom of Prussia, German Empire
- Died: 29 August 1931 (aged 40) Mainz, Weimar Republic
- Cause of death: Heart attack
- Party: Nazi Party
- Other political affiliations: National Socialist Freedom Party
- Profession: Civil servant

Military service
- Allegiance: German Empire; Weimar Republic
- Branch/service: Imperial German Army; Reichswehr
- Years of service: 1911–1920
- Rank: Offiziersstellvertreter
- Unit: Pioneer Battalion 21
- Battles/wars: World War I
- Awards: Iron Cross, 2nd class Military Merit Cross; Wound Badge

Peter Gemeinder (31 January 1891 – 29 August 1931) was a German from the working class who became a soldier and fought in the First World War. He became a business representative, a tax official and an early member of the Nazi Party (NSDAP). He was politically active in municipal, provincial and national legislative positions. He became a member of the German Reichstag and the Nazi Gauleiter in the People's State of Hesse before his early death.

== Early life and military career ==
Gemeinder was born on 31 January 1891 in Dillhausen. He attended Volksschule in Biebrich until 1905. He then worked as a bricklayer until 1908 and as a factory worker to help support his family.

In 1911, Gemeinder enlisted as a soldier in Nassau Pioneer Battalion 21, headquartered in Kassel. He served in the First World War from August 1914 until the end of the war in November 1918, becoming an Offiziersstellvertreter ("deputy officer" or warrant officer) in December 1917. He was twice wounded in action and was awarded the Iron Cross, 2nd class, the Military Merit Cross and the Wound Badge. Gemeinder remained in the peacetime German army, the Reichswehr, was selected as a Soldatenrat (soldier councilor) to the German Workers' and Soldiers' Councils and attended the December 1918 and April 1919 national congresses. He was discharged from the Reichswehr in July 1920 and found employment as a business representative in Kassel. At the end of 1921, he entered the civil service at the Finance Office in Frankfurt am Main where he would remain employed for the next ten years.

== Nazi political career ==
On 26 May 1922, together with Jakob Sprenger, Gemeinder became one of the founding members of the Nazi Party in Frankfurt. By 1923, he also joined Gottfried Feder's Fighting League (Kampfbund) for Breaking Interest Bondage, which demanded nationalization of all banks and an abolition of interest. In December 1924, in the aftermath of the failed Beer Hall Putsch when the Nazi Party was outlawed, Gemeinder became a member of the National Socialist Freedom Party, a Nazi front organization. At that time, he was elected as a city councilor in Frankfurt, serving until December 1930.

On 2 June 1925, Gemeinder formally rejoined the Nazi Party, just over three months after the ban on it was lifted. In June 1926, he became the leader of the Party's faction on the city council. On 1 March 1927, Sprenger appointed him Ortsgruppenleiter (local group leader) of greater Frankfurt. On 17 November 1929, he was elected to the Landtag of the Prussian province of Hesse-Nassau. In 1930, he also attained membership in the regional diet of the Regierungsbezirk Wiesbaden (Wiesbaden government region). On 14 September 1930, Gemeinder entered national politics when he was elected to the Reichstag from electoral constituency 19, Hesse-Nassau. On 9 January 1931, Gemeinder succeeded Friedrich Ringshausen becoming the second Gauleiter of Gau Hesse-Darmstadt, which comprised the People's State of Hesse.

== Death ==
Gemeinder's tenure was short, as on 29 August 1931 he died of a heart attack, after speaking at a Party rally in Mainz. He was denied burial in a Catholic cemetery, a move that sparked protests from the Party. He was succeeded as Gauleiter by Karl Lenz.

== Sources ==
- Höffkes, Karl (1986). Hitlers Politische Generale. Die Gauleiter des Dritten Reiches: ein biographisches Nachschlagewerk. Tübingen: Grabert-Verlag. ISBN 3-87847-163-7.
- Information about Peter Gemeinder in the Reichstag database
- Miller, Michael D.; Schulz, Andreas (2012). Gauleiter: The Regional Leaders of the Nazi Party and Their Deputies, 1925–1945. Vol. 1 (Herbert Albrecht – H. Wilhelm Hüttmann). R. James Bender Publishing. ISBN 978-1-932-97021-0.
- Peter Gemeinder in Hessische Geschichte entdecken und erforschen
