= Karl Linder =

German Nazi official (1900–1979)

Gauleiter of Gau Hesse-Nassau South
- In office 1 October 1926 – 1 April 1927
- Preceded by: Walter Schultz
- Succeeded by: Jakob Sprenger

Deputy Gauleiter of Gau Hesse-Nassau South
- In office 1 January 1928 – 17 August 1932

Gauleiter of Gau Hesse-Nassau South
- In office 17 August 1932 – 31 December 1932
- Preceded by: Jakob Sprenger
- Succeeded by: Jakob Sprenger

Deputy Gauleiter of Gau Hesse-Nassau
- In office 1 January 1933 – 15 March 1933
- Preceded by: Position established
- Succeeded by: Heinrich Reiner

Second Bürgermeister of Frankfurt am Main
- In office 13 March 1933 – 30 June 1937
- Succeeded by: Joseph Kremmer

Deputy Gauleiter of Gau Hesse-Nassau
- In office 1 July 1937 – 8 May 1945
- Preceded by: Heinrich Reiner
- Succeeded by: Position abolished

Personal details
- Born: Friedrich Wilhelm Karl Linder; 5 April 1900 Frankfurt am Main, Kingdom of Prussia, German Empire
- Died: 17 March 1979 (aged 78) Groß-Bieberau, West Germany
- Party: National Socialist German Workers' Party (NSDAP)
- Profession: Civil Servant

Military service
- Allegiance: German Empire
- Branch/service: Imperial German Army
- Years of service: 1918
- Unit: Infantry Regiment 81
- Battles/wars: World War I

Karl Linder (5 April 1900 in Frankfurt am Main – 17 March 1979 in Groß-Bieberau) was a Nazi Party (NSDAP) official who served as Gauleiter of Gau Hesse-Nassau South and Gau Hesse-Nassau as well as in many governmental positions, including as Second Bürgermeister of Frankfurt am Main. A member of the Sturmabteilung (SA), Linder held the rank of SA-Brigadeführer.

== Early years ==
The son of a businessman, Linder attended elementary, middle and high school in Frankfurt. In June 1918, he volunteered for military service in World War I and served during the closing months of the war with a communications replacement company and in Infantry Regiment 81. After the war, Linder joined the Freikorps and fought in the Spartacist uprising in early 1919. He then took courses in civil service and commercial trade. He also studied economics at the University of Frankfurt am Main but broke off his studies in 1920. That year, Linder joined the Finance Administration in Frankfurt as a civil service candidate. He passed his civil service examinations in 1923 and worked in the Finance Department as a senior tax secretary and tax inspector until 1933.

== Nazi Party career ==
In September 1923, Linder joined the National Socialist German Workers' Party (NSDAP). The Party was banned in the aftermath of the Beer Hall Putsch, but re-established in February 1925. Linder rejoined the Party on 2 June 1925 (membership number 5,284). He became the Gau Treasurer for Gau Hesse-Nassau South, and on 1 October 1926, succeeded Walter Schultz as Gauleiter, serving until 1 April 1927 when he was succeeded by Jakob Sprenger. Linder then became the Gau Business Manager serving until 1 January 1928. On that date he became Deputy Gauleiter to Sprenger who valued Linder's organizational talent, propaganda skills and knowledge of public finances. In addition, he held the post of Gau Treasurer from 1 July 1927 to 31 March 1929.

In May 1928 Linder became a Stadtverordneter (City Councillor) of Frankfurt. Also in 1928, Linder became a member of the State Committee for Hesse-Nassau. In November 1929, he was elected to the Municipal Parliament of Wiesbaden and the Landtag (Provincial Parliament) of Hesse-Nassau, becoming the leader of the Nazi Party faction in that body. Linder also served as a Party Reichsredner (National Speaker) and was engaged in propaganda activities. In the parliamentary election of September 1930, Linder was elected as a deputy to the Reichstag from electoral constituency 19 (Hessen-Nassau). He retained this seat until the end of National Socialist rule in May 1945.

When Sprenger moved up to the position of Landesinspekteur on 17 August 1932, Linder succeeded him as Gauleiter of Hesse-Nassau South. However, in December 1932, the entire Landesinspekteur system was repealed, following the fall from power of Gregor Strasser whose brainchild it was. On 1 January 1933, Sprenger returned as Gauleiter of the new Gau Hesse-Nassau (formed by the merger of Gau Hesse-Nassau South and Gau Hesse-Darmstadt) and Linder returned as his Deputy Gauleiter. From April 1933 to September 1939, Linder also headed the Gau Department of Municipal Politics, and was simultaneously the Chairman of the Hesse-Nassau office of the German Municipal Association.

In March 1933, Linder left the Deputy Gauleiter position after he was appointed Second Bürgermeister and head of human resources for the city of Frankfurt under Oberbürgermeister Friedrich Krebs. Linder set about dismissing numerous civil servants who were Jewish or political opponents of the Nazi Party, even before the anti-Semitic Law for the Restoration of the Professional Civil Service was passed in April. In early 1933, he was also named to the Prussian State Council. From March 1933 to July 1937, Linder served as the editor of the magazine Das Rathaus (The Town Hall). In January 1935, he was appointed to the Prussian Provincial Council for Hesse-Nassau, serving through the end of the Nazi regime in 1945.

On 1 July 1937, when he relinquished his position as Second Bürgermeister of Frankfurt, Linder was again appointed Deputy Gauleiter of Gau Hesse-Nassau. He held this office until the end of the regime. On 20 April 1941, Linder was promoted to the Party rank of Befehlsleiter (Command Leader). In late March 1945, when the American army was invading Hesse-Nassau, Linder opposed the orders to destroy the bridges over the Main River. During the Battle of Frankfurt, just before the fall of the city on 29 March 1945, Linder fled to Thuringia.

== Postwar years ==
Linder went into hiding in the last days of the war, eventually escaping to Austria. He disappeared for the next five years, working as a laborer under assumed names. Returning to Hesse, Linder presented himself to the authorities in March 1950 and was briefly interned. The Central Denazification Arbitration Chamber of Hesse closed the case against Linder in November 1951. It found insufficient evidence for his being classified as a major offender. No additional details are known about Linder's life.

== Bibliography ==
- Höffkes, Karl (1986). Hitlers Politische Generale. Die Gauleiter des Dritten Reiches: ein biographisches Nachschlagewerk. Tübingen: Grabert-Verlag. ISBN 3-87847-163-7.
- Miller, Michael D.; Schulz, Andreas (2017). Gauleiter: The Regional Leaders of the Nazi Party and Their Deputies, 1925-1945. Vol. II (Georg Joel - Dr. Bernhard Rust). R. James Bender Publishing. ISBN 978-1-932970-32-6.
