= Heinrich Reiner =

Nazi Party official and politician

Deputy Gauleiter of Gau Hesse-Nassau
- In office 15 March 1933 – 30 June 1937
- Preceded by: Karl Linder
- Succeeded by: Karl Linder

Deputy Führer der Landesregierung, People's State of Hesse
- In office April 1935 – 8 May 1945
- Preceded by: Position created
- Succeeded by: Position abolished

State Secretary, People's State of Hesse
- In office 1 January 1938 – 8 May 1945
- Succeeded by: Position abolished

Additional positions
- 1936–1945: Member of the Hessian State Council
- 1936–1934: Member of the Reichstag

Personal details
- Born: 10 December 1892 Hof, Kingdom of Bavaria, German Empire
- Died: 15 January 1946 (aged 53) Georgensgmünd, Occupied Germany
- Party: Nazi Party
- Profession: Military officer Engineer

Military service
- Allegiance: German Empire; Weimar Republic
- Branch/service: Royal Bavarian Army; Reichswehr
- Years of service: 1913–1919; 1919–1920
- Rank: Oberleutnant
- Unit: 4th Pioneer Battalion; 4th Engineer Battalion; 1st Pioneer Battalion; 7th Pioneer Battalion
- Battles/wars: World War I

Heinrich Reiner (10 December 1892 – 15 January 1946) was a German Nazi Party official and politician who served as the Deputy Gauleiter of Hesse-Nassau and in several governmental posts in the People's State of Hesse. He died in Allied custody eight months after the defeat of Nazi Germany in the Second World War.

== Early life ==
Reiner was born in Hof, Bavaria. After attending the Volksschule and the Gymnasium in Regensburg, he enlisted in the 4th Pioneer Battalion of the Royal Bavarian Army in 1913 as a Fahnenjunker (officer candidate). In September 1914 shortly after the outbreak of the First World War, he was commissioned as a Leutnant, and fought as a pioneer and pilot on the western front. In 1917 he was appointed as an adjutant to the commanding general of pioneers at the 6th Army. In 1918, he was promoted to Oberleutnant.

After the end of the war, Reiner was made company commander in the 4th Engineer Battalion in Ingolstadt. In March 1919, he joined the Freikorps commanded by Franz Ritter von Epp, where he acted as a recruiting officer. He also participated with them in the overthrow of the Bavarian Soviet Republic in May 1919. From June to October 1919, he held a command at the officer training school in Munich. He later transferred to the 1st Pioneer Battalion of the Reichswehr Rifle Brigade 21 and, later, to the 7th Pioneer Battalion. He was discharged from the army in April 1920. From 1920 to 1931 Reiner worked as an engineer in the construction and electrical industries.

== Nazi Party career ==
In April 1923, Reiner joined the Nazi Party but, after the party was banned in the wake of the Beer Hall Putsch, he joined a Nazi front organization and rejoined the Party after the ban was lifted. From 1932 he worked full-time in the Party and became the adjutant to Jakob Sprenger, then the Gauleiter in Hesse Nassau with its capital in Frankfurt. Following the Nazi seizure of power, Reiner was appointed as Deputy Gauleiter of Hesse-Nassau under Sprenger on 15 March 1933, succeeding Karl Linder. He was also made a member of the municipal Landtag of Wiesbaden and the provincial Landtag of Hesse-Nassau. In July 1933, he became a Regierungsrat (Government Councilor) under Sprenger, who was also the Reichsstatthalter (Reich Governor) in the People's State of Hesse. In April 1935, Reiner was appointed deputy to Sprenger in his capacity as Führer der Landesregierung (Leader of the State Government) of the State of Hesse. In June 1935, he was named president of the German Red Cross (DRK) for Hesse. In January 1936, he was appointed a Hessian State Councilor.

On 29 March 1936, Reiner was elected as a deputy to the Reichstag for constituency 33 (Hesse-Darmstadt). He was reelected in 1938 and served until the fall of the Nazi regime in May 1945. On 30 June 1937, he left his post as Deputy Gauleiter, and the post was again filled by Linder. In January 1938, Reiner was named State Secretary in the Hesse state government, and he also became the overall head of the DRK for Landesstelle (state office) XII. In addition, he held the position of head of the Oberhessische Versorgungsbetriebe (Upper Hessian Utilities Association) and was a member of the supervisory boards of Südwestdeutsche Flugbetriebs AG, Rhein Main Luftschiffhafen GmbH and Preußische Elektrizitäts AG. Frankfurt fell to elements of the US Army on 29 March 1945 and Reiner was arrested and interned in early April. He died while still in custody in a camp at Georgensgmünd, near Nuremberg, in mid-January 1946.

== Sources ==
- Heinrich Reiner entry in Hessian Biography online
- Information about Heinrich Reiner in the Reichstag database
- Stockhorst, Erich (1985). 5000 Köpfe: Wer War Was im 3. Reich. Arndt. ISBN 978-3-887-41116-9.
