= Hakenkreuzbanner =

German newspaper (1931–1945)

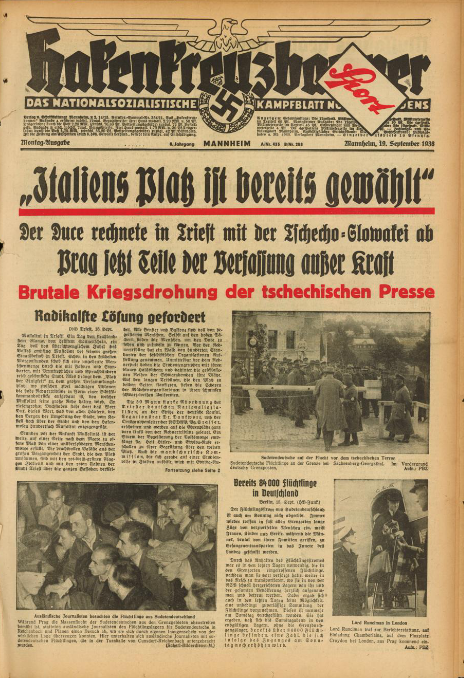
- September 19, 1938 issue of Hakenkreuzbanner
- Type: Weekly (1931); Daily (1932–1945)
- Founder: Karl Lenz
- Editor-in-chief: Wilhelm J. Kattermann
- Deputy editor: Karl M. Hageneier
- Founded: January 3, 1931
- Ceased publication: March 23, 1945
- Political alignment: Nazism
- Language: German language
- Headquarters: R 3, 14/15, Mannheim
- Country: Germany
- Circulation: 49,458 (as of January 1937)
- Sister newspapers: Der Führer, Volksgemeinschaft

Hakenkreuzbanner ('Hooked Cross Banner') was a newspaper published from Mannheim, Germany, between 1931 and 1945. It was a local organ of the Nazi Party (NSDAP). After the seizure of power by Adolf Hitler and the NSDAP in 1933, Hakenkreuzbanner grew in influence within the Mannheim media scene. Under the new regime, the newspaper acquired its rotary printing presses and office buildings by violently taking them from a Social Democratic competitor. Publication stopped in the latter stage of the Second World War.

== Early period ==
The Hakenkreuzbanner was launched in 1931 alongside the Heidelberg newspaper Volksgemeinschaft to complement the main NSDAP organ in Gau Baden, Der Führer. The first issue of Hakenkreuzbanner was published on January 3, 1931 as the NSDAP party organ for the Mannheim and Weinheim districts. At the time of its founding, it was published weekly. Hakenkreuzbanner had a meagre starting capital of 1,300 Reichmarks. It was initially printed in Heidelberg. The Reichstag deputy Karl Lenz was the publisher of Hakenkreuzbanner.

In May 1931 the publishing frequency was increased to twice a week. In January 1932 Hakenkreuzbanner became a daily newspaper. As of 1932 the newspaper had a circulation of 10,000 copies. On November 1, 1932 Gauleiter Robert Wagner appointed Kurt Schönwitz as Publishing Manager for Hakenkreuzbanner, and tasked him with overseeing the separation of Hakenkreuzbanner from Volksgemeinschaft and set up its own publishing house.

== Attack on Volksstimme ==
On the night between March 9 and 10, 1933 the offices and printing press of the Social Democratic newspaper Volkstimme at R 3, 14/15 in Quadratestadt were attacked by the Sturmabteilung (SA), Schutzstaffel (SS) and police forces. Schönwitz (who aside from his role at the newspaper held the title of Obersturmbannführer) took part in the assault. The pretext for the attack was a claim that a National Socialist rally had been fired upon from the Volksstimme building. Following the violent seizure of the Volksstimme premises the Hakenkreuzbanner editorial team moved into the building. Having seized the Volksstimme rotary presses, the printing of Hakenkreuzbanner was moved out of Heidelberg.

== Editions ==
In 1933 separate editions for Schwetzingen-Hockenheim (published from Schwetzingen) and Weinheim were launched. Towards the end of 1933, the main Mannheim edition was split into a first and a second edition. From 1933 to 1939, the first Mannheim edition was published twice daily (or rather, twelve times weekly), whilst the second Mannheim edition was published seven times a week. The first Mannheim edition issues had 12 pages, the second Mannheim edition issues had 22 pages. Recurring supplements of Hakenkreuzbanner included Deutsches Leben ('German life'), Durch deutsche Gaue ('Through German Gaue') and Die deutsche Frau ('The German Woman').

On January 1, 1935 Schönwitz was promoted to Publishing Director of Hakenkreuzbanner. As of 1935 the circulation had reached 41,000 copies daily. The newspaper was published by Hakenkreuzbanner-Verlag und Druckerei G.m.b.H..

== Domination of the Mannheim press sector ==
The Hakenkreuzbanner emerged as the largest newspaper in Mannheim. The newspaper came to dominate the Mannheim advertising market and the municipal authorities would publish their notices in its pages. By January 1937 the main Mannheim edition had a daily circulation 39,290 copies, whilst the total circulation of all its editions stood at 49,458. Before the 1933 National Socialist seizure of power Mannheim had eight notable local newspapers, by 1939 only Hakenkreuzbanner and Neue Mannheimer Zeitung remained.

== Editorial team ==
As of 1937 the editorial team of Hakenkreuzbanner consisted of Dr. Wilhelm J. Kattermann (editor-in-chief), Karl M. Hageneier (deputy editor-in-chief), Helmuth Wüst (managing director), Dr. Wilhelm Kicherer (politics, news), Wilhelm Ratzel (economics, trade), Friedrich Karl Haas (Municipal affairs, National Socialist movement), Fritz Haas (local affairs) and Julius Etz (sports section). The advertising maneger was Karl Heberling. Frequent contributors to the newspaper were Hans Joachim von Reischach (Berlin), Dr. Johann von Leers (Berlin) and Hans 'Hauptmann' Tröbst (Manchukuo). On September 19, 1938 Reichsleiter for Press Max Amann named Schönwitz as the new head of the NS-Gauverlag Tirol in Innsbruck. Walter Mehls was named new Publishing Director of Hakenkreuzbanner.

== Second World War ==
By 1939 the circulation had reached 60,000 copies daily. In 1939 the two Mannheim editions of Hakenkreuzbanner were merged back into one daily edition. The buildings of both Hakenkreuzbanner and its sole remaining local competitor Neue Mannheimer Zeitung were severely damaged in Allied bombardments, and from January 1, 1944 onward Neue Mannheimer Zeitung was published jointly with Hakenkreuzbanner. In the latter phase of the war the number of pages of Hakenkreuzbanner was decreased. The last issue of the newspaper was published on March 23, 1945.
