= Carl Ulrich =

German politician (1853–1933)

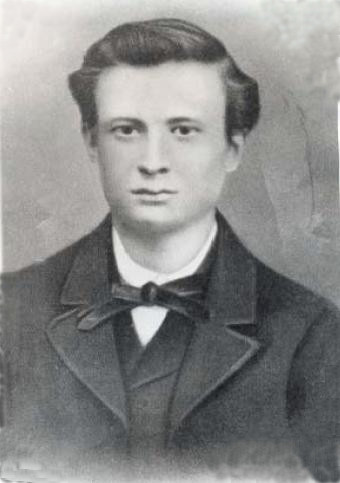
- Ulrich in 1870

State-President of the People's State of Hesse
- In office 11 November 1918 – 14 February 1928
- Preceded by: Christian Wilhelm Karl Ewald
- Succeeded by: Bernhard Adelung

Member of the Reichstag
- In office 1890–1903
- In office 1907–1930

Member of the Landtag of Hesse
- In office 1885–1931

Personal details
- Born: 28 January 1853 Braunschweig, Duchy of Brunswick
- Died: 12 April 1933 (aged 80) Offenbach am Main, Nazi Germany
- Party: SPD

Carl Theodor Johann Ulrich (28 January 1853 – 12 April 1933) was a German politician of the Social Democratic Party (SPD) who served as the first State-President of the People's State of Hesse from 1918 to 1928. He was a member of the Hessian state parliament for 46 continuous years from 1885 to 1931, making him the longest-serving legislator in German history. He also served in the Reichstag for 36 years between 1890 and 1930.

== Early life ==
Ulrich was born in Braunschweig in 1853. The son of a shoemaker, he left school in 1867 and completed an apprenticeship as a mechanical engineer. In 1872, he traveled throughout Germany and nearby countries, visiting Saxony, Hesse, Bavaria, Baden, Bohemia, and Switzerland. In 1874, he settled in the city of Offenbach in the Grand Duchy of Hesse, where he worked in a machine tool factory and joined the metalworkers' union. He quickly became a committed socialist and labour organiser, for which he was arrested and imprisoned for 30 days in December 1874. After his release, he was one of the youngest delegates to attend the founding congress of the Socialist Workers' Party of Germany (SAPD) in 1875. The same year, became the full-time editor of the social-democratic newspaper Neue Offenbacher Tages-Zeitung, later also becoming managing director of the cooperative printing company.

== Political career ==
In 1885, Ulrich was elected to both chambers of the Hessian state parliament. Alongside Franz Jöst, he was the first social democratic representative in Hesse. He represented the city of Mainz in the upper house until 1896, and served continuously as a member of the lower house and its successor bodies until 1931. He was a prominent pragmatist within the SPD and stayed out of its many disputes over theory, declaring in 1898: "We don't float in the clouds, we live on the earth."

In 1886, Ulrich and a number of leading German social democrats, including August Bebel and Ignaz Auer, were charged under the Anti-Socialist Laws and sentenced to nine months imprisonment. After his release, he became publisher of the Offenbacher Abendblatt and manager of its cooperative printing company. By the end of the 1880s, he was the preeminent leader of the SPD in Hesse. He was elected to the Reichstag in 1890, of which he remained a member until the end of the Empire, excluding a single term of absence from 1903 to 1907. He was also elected to the city council of Offenbach in 1896 and served until 1918.

=== Weimar Republic ===
The Hessian monarchy was abolished at the climax of the German Revolution of 1918–1919 on 11 November 1918, and Ulrich became Minister-President of the new republican state. He formed a moderate cabinet comprising the SPD, the German Democratic Party (DDP), and the Zentrum, which served until the first elections were held in January 1919. They delivered a victory for the SPD, and Ulrich formed a second cabinet with the DDP and Zentrum which took office in February. At the same time, he was elected to the National Assembly of the new Weimar Republic, and subsequently re-elected to the Reichstag for over a decade.

The state constitution came into force on 20 March 1920, and Ulrich continued in office as State-President (German: Staatspräsident). His government was re-elected in 1921, 1924, and 1927. In 1922, he took over the education ministry and worked to implement universal primary education across the state. He became a broadly popular figure in Hesse during his long political career, earning the nickname "the red grand duke" (German: der rote Großherzog). On his 75th birthday in 1928, he received praise from the liberal Frankfurter Zeitung and a letter of congratulations from former Grand Duke of Hesse Ernest Louis. He retired later that year and was succeeded as State-President by fellow Social Democrat Bernhard Adelung. He remained a member of both the Reichstag and the state Landtag until 1930 and 1931, respectively.

Ulrich died in Offenbach city hospital on 12 April 1933. He is buried in the old cemetery in Offenbach am Main. A number of landmarks in the city are named in his honour, including the Carl-Ulrich-Brücke which crosses the Main river between the Offenbach and Fechenheim, and the Carl-Ulrich-Siedlung.
