= Paul Schulz =

German military officer and Nazi Party official

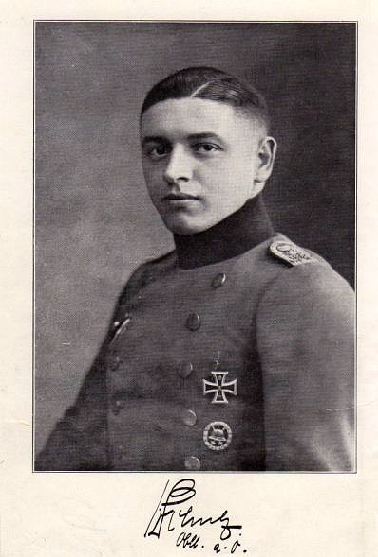
- Schulz in 1920

Reichsinspekteur I
- In office 15 June 1932 – 8 December 1932
- Preceded by: Position established
- Succeeded by: Position abolished

NSDAP Organization Department Head
- In office October 1931 – 15 June 1932

Personal details
- Born: 5 February 1898 Stettin (today, Szczecin), Province of Pomerania, Kingdom of Prussia, German Empire
- Died: 31 August 1963 (aged 65) Laichingen, Baden-Württemberg, West Germany
- Party: Nazi Party

Military service
- Allegiance: German Empire; Weimar Republic
- Branch/service: German Army (German Empire); Reichswehr
- Years of service: 1912–1920
- Rank: Oberleutnant
- Battles/wars: World War I

Paul Schulz (5 February 1898 – 31 August 1963) was a German military officer and Nazi Party official perhaps best known as a leader of the vigilante paramilitary Black Reichswehr group in the 1920s.

== Early years ==
In 1912, Schulz entered non-commissioned officers' school in Potsdam. Wounded several times in World War I, he was promoted to Leutnant in the spring of 1918 because of bravery and outstanding performance. After the end of the war Schulz joined the Freikorps.

He took part in the fighting in the Baltic States in a battalion commanded by Bruno Ernst Buchrucker. He became Buchrucker's adjutant in the Reichswehr and was promoted to Oberleutnant. Because of their support for the Kapp Putsch in March 1920, Schulz and Buchrucker both were discharged from the army.

== Black Reichswehr ==
Schulz was reinstated by the Ministry of the Reichswehr under private contract as part of the Black Reichswehr. This was a paramilitary organization in the Weimar Republic that was used to provide additional manpower reserves for the Reichswehr in violation of the Versailles Treaty. Schulz was commissioned to set up a work detachment in Küstrin. At the end of 1922, Schulz moved to the Wehrkreis (Military District) III in Berlin, where he set up other work groups for the Black Reichswehr. During the Küstrin Putsch on 1 October 1923, Schulz was arrested but ultimately not charged.

Schulz was involved with the Feme murders of "traitors" within the Black Reichswehr. Because of his involvement in them, Schulz was given the nickname "Feme-Schulz". He also planned and organized the murder of left-wing politicians and other alleged "enemies of the Reich". He was implicated in the murder of Black Reichswehr Wachmeister Willi Legner, but was never tried.

In March 1925, Schulz was arrested for inciting several murders. Brought to trial, he was sentenced to death on 26 March 1927 for inciting the murder of Black Reichswehr Sergeant Walter Wilms. Also sentenced to death were First Lieutenant Fritz Fuhrmann and Sergeant Erich Klapproth, who carried out the murder. All three death sentences were commuted to life imprisonment by President Paul von Hindenburg in February 1928.

To large parts of the German right-wing he was considered a martyr. While in jail, Schulz was in contact with numerous right wing politicians, including Gregor Strasser of the Nazi Party. In May 1928, the 12 newly elected Nazi members of the Reichstag called for his release. In October 1930, a political amnesty was granted and Schulz obtained his freedom. He joined the Nazi Party on 24 October 1930 and was assigned to Strasser's Organisationsabteilung (Organization Department) at Party headquarters in Munich.

== Nazi Party career ==
Though not a member of the Sturmabteilung (SA), Schulz was temporarily appointed Acting SA Leader-East in April 1931. He was given the task of reorganizing the Berlin SA in the wake of the Stennes Revolt. Schulz brought the mutinous Berlin SA again under control of the party leadership and left the post at the end of May.

In October 1931, returning to Strasser's organization, he was made head of the department (Arbeitsdienstpflichtamt), charged with setting up the Party's prototype labor service system. Schulz very soon established a warm personal friendship and solid working relationship with Strasser. With his numerous contacts in the army, civil service and industry, he often served as Strasser's intermediary to influential people outside the Party, including General Kurt von Schleicher and Chancellor Heinrich Brüning.

In April 1932, Schulz was elected as a member of the Prussian Landtag. In the summer of 1932 Strasser initiated a series of organizational reforms to consolidate and centralize the Party structure by imposing an additional layer of supervision on the Gauleiters. Strasser sought to improve organizational control of the Party ahead of the upcoming election to the German Reichstag.

On 15 June 1932 Schulz was appointed to the new position of Reichsinspekteur I, with oversight responsibility for five new Landesinspekteurs, each overseeing between one and five Gaue. Robert Ley was appointed Reichsinspekteur II, responsible for another five Landesinspekteurs. Thus, Schulz, in a relatively brief time, reached the highest levels in the Party hierarchy. His tenure was short-lived.

On 8 December 1932, Strasser resigned as Reichsorganisationsleiter in a major policy dispute with Hitler over the future direction of the Party. In seeking to eradicate Strasser's legacy, Hitler decreed a thorough revocation of the recent administrative reforms. The positions of Landesinspekteur and Reichsinspekteur were abolished. Hitler temporarily assumed the duties of Reichsorganisationsleiter, with Ley as Chief of Staff. Schulz, closely associated with Strasser, followed him into retirement.

== Night of the Long Knives and later life ==
On 30 June 1934 during the Night of the Long Knives, Strasser was killed along with dozens of Hitler's opponents. Schulz was arrested and taken to Gestapo headquarters. He was driven into the Grunewald Forest outside Potsdam near the village of Seddiner See where he was shot in the back. Schulz, seriously injured, fell to the ground and feigned death.

When the assassins turned away to fetch a tarpaulin and remove the body, Schulz fled into the forest and managed to escape. For the next few days he stayed with a friend who, acting as an intermediary, obtained a guarantee of protection from Hitler in exchange for Schulz leaving Germany. Schulz left for Switzerland on 20 July 1934 and lived there as a businessman. He later moved to Athens in 1935, and in 1940 to Budapest.

After the war, Schulz returned to West Germany. He was active as a businessman and ultimately managed a construction machinery plant in Neustadt an der Weinstrasse. In 1963 he died in Laichingen.

== Sources ==
- Orlow, Dietrich (1969). The History of the Nazi Party: 1919–1933. University of Pittsburgh Press. ISBN 0-8229-3183-4.
- Stachura, Peter D (1983). Gregor Strasser and the Rise of Nazism. London: George Allen & Unwin Ltd. ISBN 978-0-04943-027-3.
