= Mainz Workers' and Soldiers' Council =

Socialist council during 1918 German Revolution

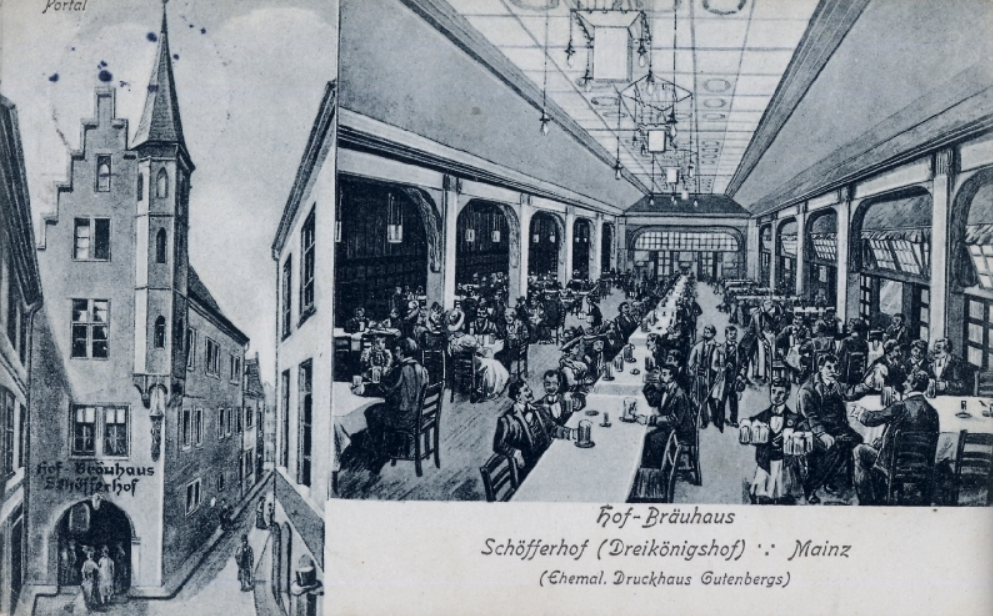
Schöfferhof restaurant, Mainz, where the Mainz Workers' and Soldiers' Council was formed

The Mainz Workers' and Soldiers' Council (German: Mainzer Arbeiter- und Soldatenrat) was the effective government of Mainz from 9 November until the arrival of French troops on 9 December 1918 during the German Revolution of 1918.

Reports of the Kiel Mutiny were published in the Mainzer Zeitung on Thursday 7 November. The next day 50 armed revolutionary sailors arrived from Kiel and immediately seized control of the railway station. The following day they proceeded to the prison to release the prisoners. The population started seizing food, particularly from the military depot.

The local Majority Social Democratic Party of Germany (MSPD) was concerned that their power would be eroded between the prospects of a conservative counter-revolution and a soviet-style revolution. Under the leadership of Bernhard Adelung, a local MSPD politician, they convened a meeting of representatives of the MSPD, the trade unions and the military in the "Schöffenhof" restaurant. There the Mainz Workers' and Soldiers' Council was formed with seven workers and seven soldiers making up their number. Bernhard Adelung was the chairman. On 12 November they sent a delegation to Ingelheim am Rhein that urged the inhabitants there to also form a workers' and soldiers' council.

They quickly took action to prevent further development of the revolution, and the Kiel sailors were obliged to return to Frankfurt. On the steps of the town hall on 10 November in Halleplatz, Adelung declared a democratic republic. The following day the terms of the Armistice were agreed, including the occupation of the Rhineland. According to the terms, French troops would arrive in Mainz. Under Adelung's leadership a reformist administration ensured public order until the arrival of French troops on 9 December 1918.
