= Inspekteur (NSDAP) =

Early Nazi political rank

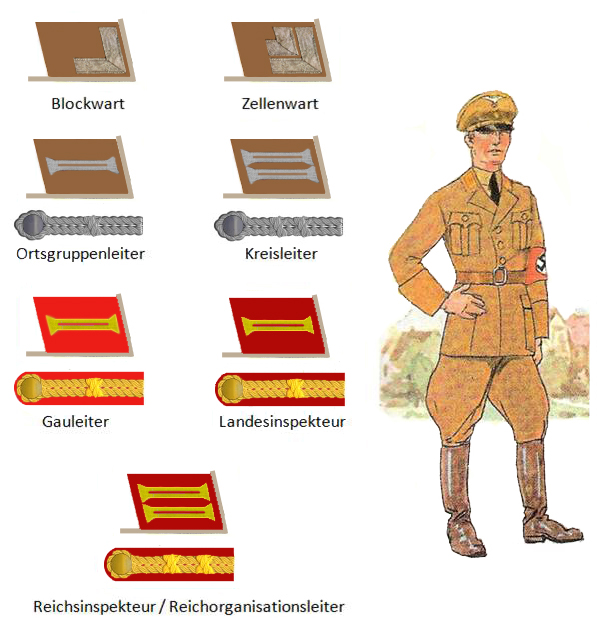
Early Nazi Party political insignia showing the political ranks of Landesinspekteur and Reichsinspekteur

Inspekteur (inspector) was a Nazi political rank that existed briefly in 1932 in a reorganization promulgated by Gregor Strasser, the Reichsorganisationsleiter (Reich Organizational Leader) of the Nazi Party since January 1928.

== History ==
Strasser largely had been given free rein to organize and structure the Party by Adolf Hitler who was not interested in administrative detail and mundane day-to-day organizational concerns. Strasser sought to consolidate and centralize the organizational structure by imposing an additional layer of supervision on the then existing 44 Gauleiters in Germany and Austria. Strasser sought to improve organizational control of the Party throughout the country ahead of the upcoming 31 July 1932 election to the German Reichstag. The overall objective was to give the Party the kind of organisational structure that would allow it to contest the election in a more effective and disciplined manner.

On 15 July 1932, the Party Gauleiters were subordinated to ten new officials titled Landesinspekteurs, each with oversight responsibilities for several Gaue within a specified geographic area. (See tables.) These new Landesinspekteurs were taken from the ranks of the existing Gauleiters, and vacated their Gau posts. Most were trusted colleagues of Strasser, and had worked with him when he was a principal organizer of the Party in northern Germany in the early 1920s. These Landesinspekteurs, in turn, reported to one of two new Reichsinspekteurs, either Paul Schulz or Robert Ley, both of whom served as close protégés of Strasser in the Party's Reichsleitung (Reich Leadership Office) in Munich.

The Landesinspekteurs were independent agents, given the authority to conduct surprise Gau inspections day or night, without advance notice. They also were given the authority to supersede the Gauleiters’ directives, if necessary. The new organization was opposed by many Gauleiters, as it imposed additional layers of Party bureaucracy between them and Hitler. They always had considered themselves as Hitler’s direct agents in their jurisdictions, and were used to reporting directly to him.

The position of Inspekteur was denoted on Nazi Party brown shirts by either one of two collar bars worn on a dark red collar patch. The shoulder boards were also paired up with a one or two knotted gold shoulder cord.

On 8 December 1932, Strasser resigned as Reichsorganisationsleiter in a major policy dispute with Hitler over the future direction of the Party. By 15 December, Hitler announced that he was temporarily assuming the duties of Reichsorganisationsleiter, with Robert Ley as Chief of Staff. Paul Schulz followed Strasser into retirement. In seeking to eradicate Strasser’s legacy, Hitler decreed a thorough revocation of the recent administrative reforms. He further reconfirmed the Gauleiters’ status as his personal agents. The positions of Landesinspekteur and Reichsinspekteur were abolished. All ten Landesinspekteurs were returned to their former Gauleiter positions. Thus, the new organizational scheme did not survive Strasser's fall, and these two Inspekteur ranks disappeared from the Party organization.

== List ==
Landesinspecteurs reporting to Paul Schulz, Reichsinspekteur I
Landesinspekteur	Area	Gaue
Joseph Goebbels	Berlin	Berlin
Helmuth Bruckner	East	Danzig, East Prussia, Silesia
Bernhard Rust	Lower Saxony	Eastern Hanover, Southern Hanover-Brunswick, Weser-Ems, Westphalia-North, Westphalia-South
Wilhelm Friedrich Loeper	Middle Germany-Brandenburg	Brandenburg, Eastern March, Halle-Merseburg, Magdeburg-Anhalt
Hinrich Lohse	North	Hamburg, Mecklenburg-Lübeck, Pomerania, Schleswig-Holstein

Landesinspecteurs reporting to Robert Ley, Reichsinspekteur II
Landesinspekteur	Area	Gaue
Theodor Habicht	Austria	Carinthia, Lower Austria, Salzburg, Styria, Tyrol, Upper Austria, Vienna, Vorarlberg
Robert Ley, Acting	Bavaria	Lower Bavaria-Upper Palatinate, Lower Franconia, Middle Franconia, Munich-Upper Bavaria, Rhine Palatinate, Swabia, Upper Franconia
Martin Mutschmann	Saxony-Thuringia	Saxony, Thuringia
Jakob Sprenger	Southwest	Baden, Hesse-Darmstadt, Hesse-Nassau North, Hesse-Nassau South, Württemberg-Hohenzollern
Heinrich Haake	West	Dusseldorf, Essen, Koblenz-Trier, Cologne-Aachen, Saarland

== Sources ==
- Clark, Jeff (2007). Uniforms of the NSDAP. Atglen, PA: Schiffer Publishing. ISBN 978-0764-32579-3.
- Orlow, Dietrich (1969). The History of the Nazi Party: 1919-1933. University of Pittsburgh Press. ISBN 0-8229-3183-4.
- Stachura, Peter D (1983). Gregor Strasser and the Rise of Nazism. London: George Allen & Unwin Ltd. ISBN 978-0-04943-027-3.
