= Heinrich Haake =

German Nazi Party politician (1892–1945)

Heinrich “Heinz” Haake

Landeshauptmann of Rhine Province
- In office 11 March 1933 – 8 May 1945
- Preceded by: Johannes Horion
- Succeeded by: Position abolished

Gauleiter of Rhineland-South
- In office 27 March 1925 – 1 June 1925
- Appointed by: Adolf Hitler
- Deputy: Robert Ley
- Preceded by: Position established
- Succeeded by: Robert Ley

Additional positions
- 1933–1945: Reichstag Deputy
- 1928–1933: Landtag of Prussia Deputy

Personal details
- Born: 24 January 1892 Cologne, Rhine Province, Kingdom of Prussia, German Empire
- Died: 17 September 1945 (aged 53) Velen, Allied-occupied Germany
- Party: Nazi Party
- Occupation: Bank clerk
- Civilian awards: Golden Party Badge

Military service
- Allegiance: German Empire
- Branch/service: Imperial German Army
- Years of service: 1914–1919
- Rank: Unteroffizier
- Battles/wars: World War I
- Military awards: Iron Cross, 2nd class

Heinrich "Heinz" Haake (24 January 1892 – 17 September 1945) was an early member and of the Nazi Party who briefly was the Gauleiter of the southern Rhineland. He served as a deputy in the Landtag of Prussia from 1928 to 1933 and in the Reichstag from 1933 to 1945. He also was the government administrator of the Rhine Province for the duration of the Nazi regime, and attained the rank of SA-Obergruppenführer in the Nazi paramilitary, the Sturmabteilung. At the end of the Second World War, he was taken prisoner by British forces and died while still in captivity.

== Early life ==
Born in Cologne, the son of a city architect, Haake attended the local Volksschule and Gymnasium, and obtained employment as a bank clerk in Cologne. When the First World War broke out in 1914, he joined the Imperial German Army as a one-year volunteer. He earned the Iron Cross second class and was wounded four times, lastly in the battle of Langemarck in Belgium, after which he was classified as severely disabled. In 1919, after discharge from the military with the rank of Unteroffizier, he returned to Cologne. He became active in the Völkisch movement and joined the Deutschvölkischer Schutz- und Trutzbund, a large and influential antisemitic organization. In 1922, he became a member of the Nazi Party and, as an early member, he would later be awarded the Golden Party Badge. When it was temporarily banned in 1924, he switched to the National Socialist Freedom Movement, a Nazi front organization and, on 7 December 1924, was elected as its sole deputy in the Prussian Landtag.

== Nazi career ==
When the Nazi Party was re-established in February 1925, Haake became its local leader in Cologne. On 27 March 1925, he was appointed Gauleiter of Rhineland-South, and officially re-joined the Party on 14 April (membership number 13,328). However, he proved to be difficult to work with, and was often in conflict with his Gau business manager, Josef Grohé. On 1 June 1925, Haake was replaced as Gauleiter by his deputy, Robert Ley. In July, he was made Ortsgruppenleiter (local group leader) of Cologne. In September 1925, he became a member of the National Socialist Working Association, a short-lived group of north and northwest German Gaue, organized and led by Gregor Strasser, which unsuccessfully sought to amend the Party program. The association was dissolved in 1926 following the Bamberg Conference. From 1928 to 1932, Haake was a manager of the Nazi faction in the Landtag, becoming 3rd vice-president of that body in 1932.

On 15 July 1932, Haake was appointed Landesinspekteur-West. In this position, he had oversight responsibility for the Gaue of Dusseldorf, Essen, Koblenz-Trier, Cologne-Aachen & the Saar, and reported directly to Robert Ley, now the deputy to Strasser, the Reichsorganisationsleiter. This reorganization was a short-lived initiative by Strasser to centralize control over the Gaue. However, it was unpopular with all the Gauleiter and was repealed on Strasser's fall from power in December 1932. At that time, Haake became leader of the Organization Department at the Brown House in Munich, again under Ley, who had succeeded Strasser.

After the Nazi seizure of power, Haake was advanced to 1st vice president of the Prussian Landtag in March 1933, serving until its dissolution by the Nazis on 14 October. On 11 March 1933, he was appointed Landeshauptmann of Prussia's Rhine Province and would remain in this position until May 1945. In October 1933, he was named a member of the Academy for German Law. On 12 November 1933, he was elected to the Reichstag for electoral constituency 20, (Cologne-Aachen), and he would hold this seat until the fall of the Nazi regime. In 1934, he became a member of the provincial council of Rhine Province and also was appointed Reichsinspekteur in the Reichsleitung (Reich leadership) of the Party. In June 1938, he was named an honorary senator of the University of Cologne. In February 1941, Haake attended a meeting with representatives of the Aktion T4 program, concerning the establishment of a euthanasia program for mentally institutionalized patients in Rhine Province. At first resistant, Haake relented when shown a Führer decree authorizing and ordering the implementation.

A member of the paramilitary Sturmabteilung (SA), Haake attained the rank of SA-Brigadeführer in 1936, SA-Gruppenführer in 1938 and, on 24 January 1942, SA-Obergruppenführer.

At the end of the war in May 1945, Haake was arrested by the British. Interned in Recklinghausen, he was transferred to the prison hospital at Velen, where he died on 17 September.

== Sources ==
- Höffkes, Karl (1986). Hitlers Politische Generale. Die Gauleiter des Dritten Reiches: ein biographisches Nachschlagewerk. Tübingen: Grabert-Verlag. ISBN 3-87847-163-7.
- Miller, Michael D.; Schulz, Andreas (2012). Gauleiter: The Regional Leaders of the Nazi Party and Their Deputies, 1925-1945. Vol. I (Herbert Albrecht - H. Wilhelm Hüttmann). R. James Bender Publishing. ISBN 978-1-932970-21-0.
- Orlow, Dietrich (1969). The History of the Nazi Party: 1919-1933. University of Pittsburgh Press. ISBN 0-8229-3183-4.
