= Starkenburg =

Historical region in Hesse, Germany

Coordinates: 49°57′21″N 7°08′26″E

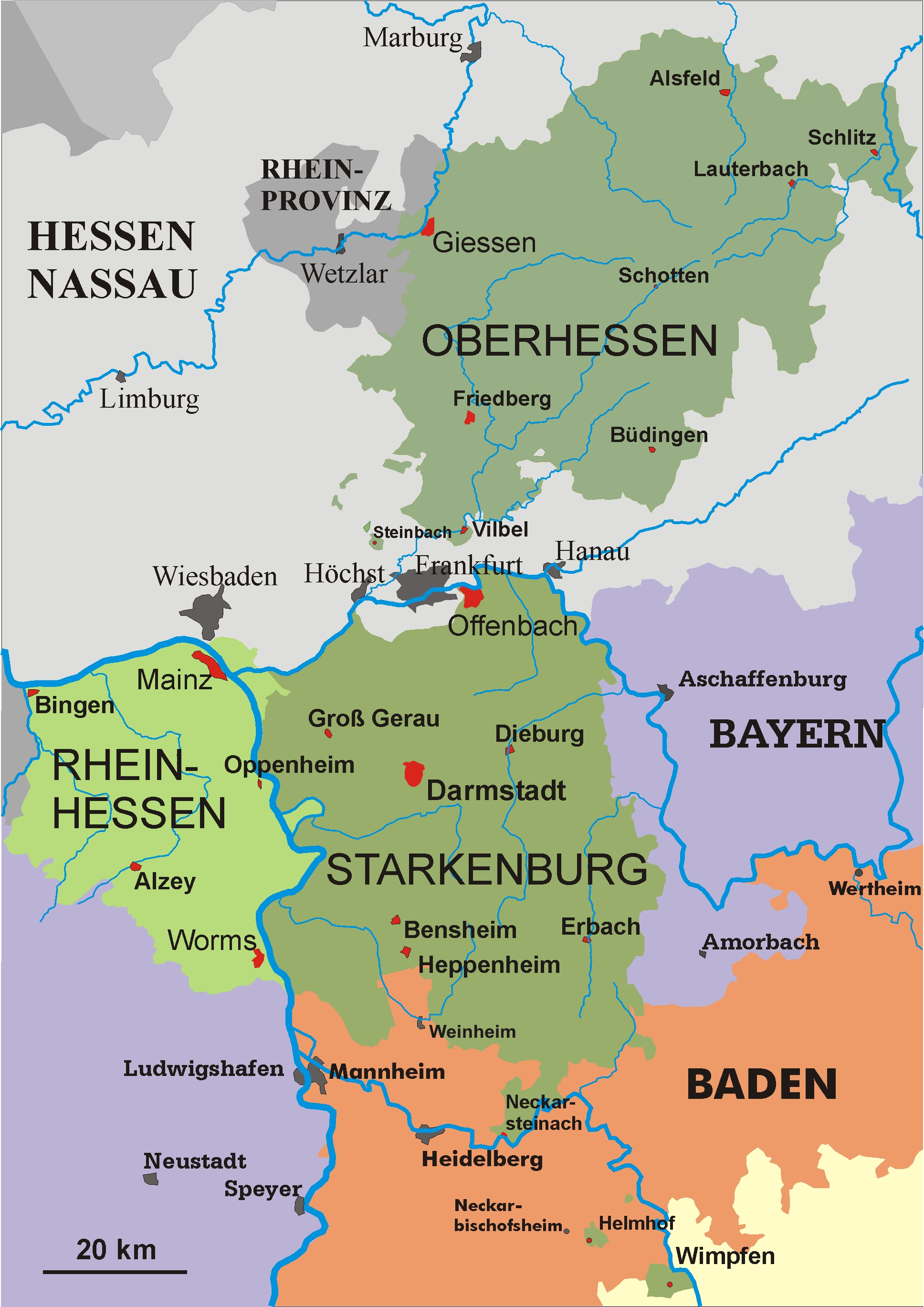
Starkenburg (centre) as one of the provinces of the People's State of Hesse in 1930

Starkenburg is a historical region in the State of Hesse, Germany, comprising the area south of the Main River and east of the Rhine, around the regional capital Darmstadt.

== Geography ==
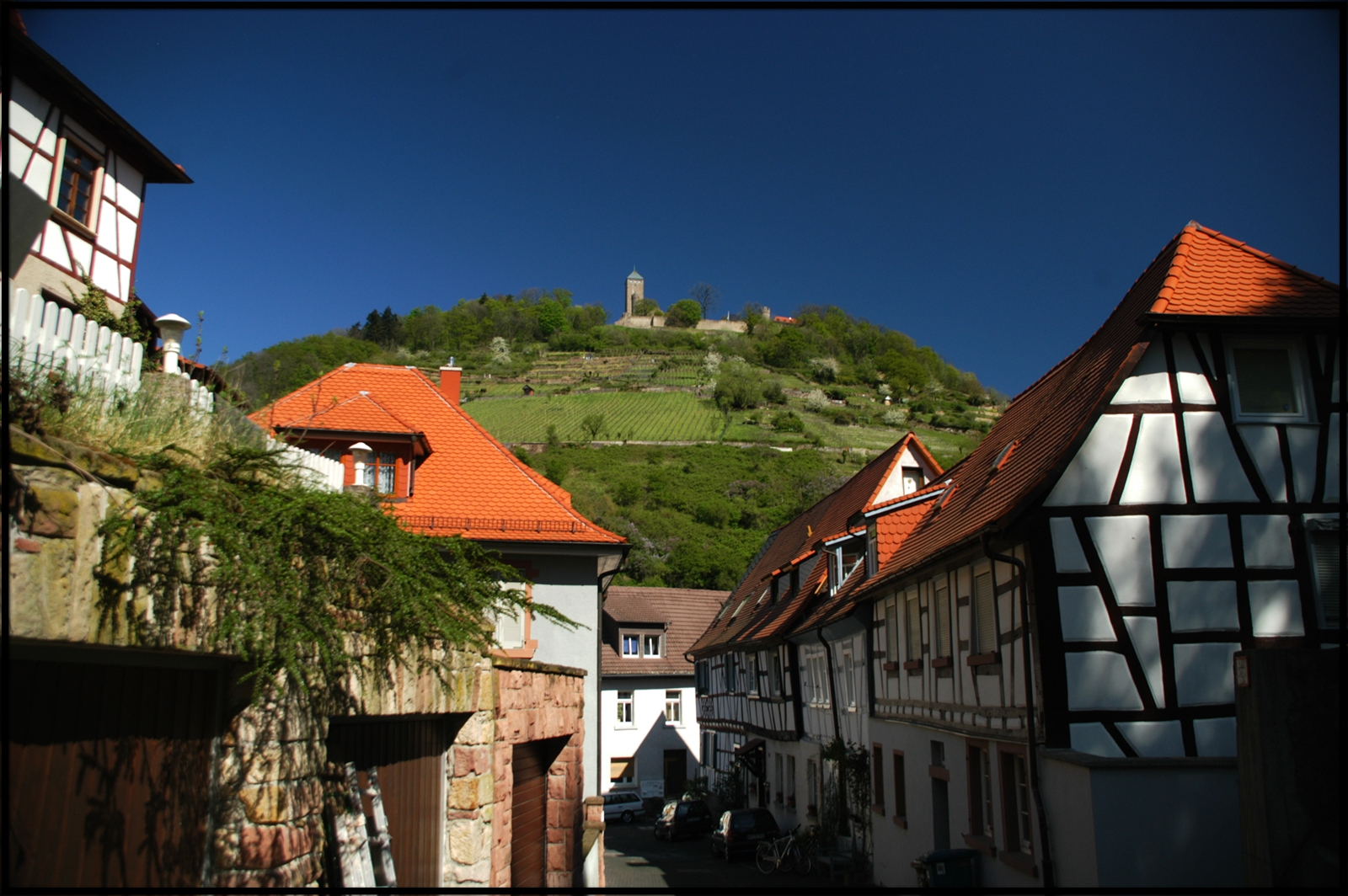
View of Starkenburg Castle from Heppenheim

The region is named after Starkenburg Castle, above Heppenheim on the historic Bergstraße Route. Beside the cities of Darmstadt and Offenbach, it consists of the modern districts (kreise):

- Bergstraße
- Darmstadt-Dieburg
- Groß-Gerau
- Odenwaldkreis
- Offenbach

The area comprises about 2,600 square kilometres (1,000 mi^{2}), Region roughly equivalent to the German state of Saarland.

== History ==
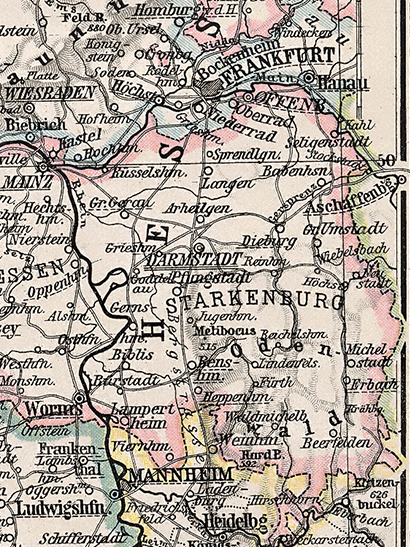
Hessian province of Starkenburg, 1905 map

Starkenburg Castle was erected about 1065 to protect the estates around Lorsch Abbey, which itself were held by the Prince-Archbishopric of Mainz from the 13th century onwards. Upon the German mediatisation of 1803, the southern territories of the Landgraviate of Hesse-Darmstadt—including the former Mainz lands on the Bergstraße—were incorporated into the newly established Principality (from 1816: Province) of Starkenburg. Elevated to the Grand Duchy of Hesse in 1806, the possessions in Starkenburg, as well as in the provinces of Upper Hesse in the north and Rhenish Hesse in the west were confirmed by resolution of the 1815 Vienna Congress.

From 1832 the administration was subdivided into seven districts (kreise):

- Bensheim
- Heppenheim, with the exclave of Wimpfen

both districts were merged into Bergstraße in 1938

- Erbach, renamed Odenwaldkreis in 1972
- Darmstadt, divided into an urban and a rural district in 1938
- Dieburg, merged with the Darmstadt rural district in 1977
- Groß-Gerau
- Offenbach, from 1874 with the Upper Hessian exclave of Steinbach, divided into an urban and a rural district in 1938.

With the establishment of the present State of Hesse, Wimpfen and Steinbach were separated from the Starkenburg region; in turn, the Bischofsheim and Ginsheim-Gustavsburg quarters of the City of Mainz, located east of the Rhine River, passed to the Groß-Gerau district. A former administrative union of the Starkenburg districts was dissolved in 2007.
