= Hesse-Darmstadt (electoral district) =

Former constituency of the Reichstag (Weimar Republic)

33 Hesse-Darmstadt Hessen-Darmstadt
- Former electoral constituency for the Reichstag
- Location within the Weimar Republic
- State: Hesse-Darmstadt
- Electorate: 755,957 (1919); 986,065 (1933)
- Major settlements: Mainz, Darmstadt, Offenbach am Main, Worms, Gießen

Former constituency
- Created: 1919
- Abolished: 1938

Hesse-Darmstadt was one of the 35 electoral districts (German: Wahlkreise) used to elect members to the Reichstag during the Weimar Republic. It sent members to the Reichstag in nine democratic elections between 1919 and 1933. It existed nominally in the show elections to the Nazi Reichstag until 1938.

Its boundaries corresponded to the contemporary People's State of Hesse, commonly known as Hesse-Darmstadt. It was constituency 33 in the numbering scheme.

== Electoral system ==
The constituency was created for the 1919 election. Under the proportional representation electoral system of the Weimar Republic, voters cast a vote for party lists. Parties were awarded a seat for every 60,000 votes in a constituency. Excess votes were aggregated at two higher levels of seat distribution: an intermediate level combining multiple constituencies, where extra seats were awarded to parties' constituency lists, and a national level where seats were awarded to national lists of each party or alliance.

== Results (1919–1933) ==
=== Vote share ===
Party	1919	1920	1924 I	1924 II	1928	1930	1932 I	1932 II	1933
KPD		0.5	9.3	5.4	8.7	11.3	10.2	13.7	10.9
USPD	1.9	12.2	0.7	0.1					
SPD	44.2	30.3	29.5	35.5	32.3	28.9	26.2	23.3	21.7
DDP	19.0	10.8	7.4	8.7	6.3	5.2	0.6	0.7	0.8
Centre	17.0	16.1	15.5	15.8	16.0	13.9	14.8	14.0	13.6
DVP	11.2	16.0	10.8	11.8	11.3	6.7	1.5	2.9	1.7
DLV					13.4	7.7			
HBB			14.3	12.6					
DNVP	6.6	14.0	6.1	7.7	3.5	1.6	1.9	3.0	2.9
Nazi			2.9	1.3	1.9	18.5	43.1	40.2	47.4
Other			3.6	1.0	6.7	6.2	1.8	2.1	1.0
Turnout	86.6	76.1	74.1	75.1	65.9	79.4	87.2	84.1	90.6
Source: Wahlen in Deutschland

=== Deputies ===
Election	Distribution	Seats
1919		9
1920		8
May 1924		8
Dec 1924		8
1928		7
1930		9
Jul 1932		13
Nov 1932		12
1933		13
Source: Wahlen in Deutschland
