= Bernhard Adelung =

German politician (1876–1943)

Bernhard Adelung (30 November 1876, Bremen – 24 February 1943, Darmstadt) was social democratic politician and President of the republic in the Peoples State of Hesse from 1928 to 1933.

After completing his apprenticeship as a typesetter and a period of travel he settled in Mainz where he married Johanna Gross the daughter of the owner of the Mainkette shipping company. He became active in the workers movement and was appointed editor of the Mainzer Volkszeitung. The following year he was imprisoned in Butzbach for three months for writing an article critical of Kaiser Wilhelm II.

He was elected to the State parliament of the Grand Duchy of Hesse on 1 December 1903.
