= People's State of Hesse =

German state (1918–1945)

People's State of Hesse Volksstaat Hessen
- State of Germany
- 1918–1945
- Flag Coat of arms

- The People's State of Hesse (red) within the Weimar Republic

Anthem
- Hessenlied "Song of Hesse"
- Capital: Darmstadt
- Area
  - Coordinates: 49°52′N 8°39′E
  - 1925: 7,692 km^{2} (2,970 sq mi)
- Population
  - 1925: 1,347,279
- Government
  - Type: Republic
- President
  - 1919–1928: Carl Ulrich
  - 1928–1933: Bernhard Adelung
  - 1933: Ferdinand Werner
  - 1933–1945: Jakob Sprenger (as Reichsstatthalter)
- Historical era: Interwar · World War II
  - German Revolution: 9 November 1918
  - Constitution: 12 December 1919
  - Disestablished: 19 September 1945
Preceded by	Succeeded by
Grand Duchy of Hesse	Greater Hesse; Rhineland-Palatinate

The People's State of Hesse (German: Volksstaat Hessen) was one of the constituent states of the Weimar Republic and Nazi Germany from 1918 to 1945. Its former territory is now part of the German states of Hesse and Rhineland-Palatinate. The term "People's State" referred to the fact that it was a republic (rather than implying that it was a socialist state) and was equivalent to the term Free State, which was used by most of the other states of the Weimar Republic.

The People's State of Hesse was created from the Grand Duchy of Hesse during the revolution of 1918–1919, which broke out after the German Empire was defeated in World War I. The revolution in Hesse was largely peaceful. A soldiers' and workers' council declared Grand Duke Ernest Louis deposed and proclaimed Hesse a republic on 9 November 1918. A popularly elected assembly then passed a republican constitution for the People's State. It had a one-chamber parliament that was led throughout the period of the Weimar Republic by the three moderate parties of the Weimar Coalition.

Parts of the People's State were occupied by the French until 1930 under the terms of the Treaty of Versailles. A separatist movement active in the Rhineland until 1923 affected parts of Hesse, but it had little popular support and was not able to establish a separate Rhineland state.

After the Nazi Party came to power in Germany in 1933, it abolished the People's State's parliament and transferred state sovereignty to the central government. After the end of World War II in May 1945, the People's State was split between the American occupation zone east of the Rhine and the French occupation zone to its west. In 1946 the American-controlled region became part of the new state of Hesse and the French area of Rhineland-Palatinate.

== Predecessor state ==
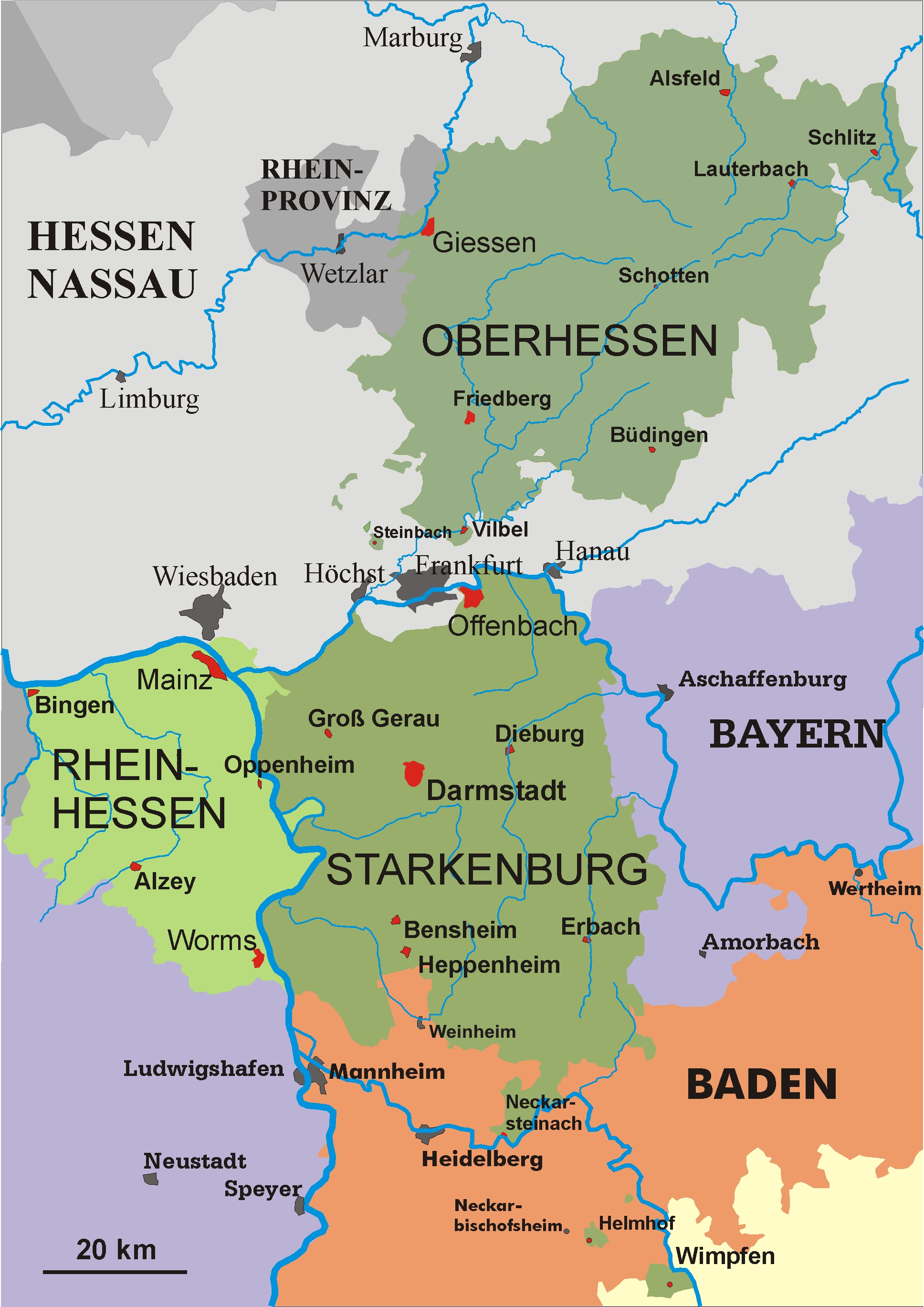
The provinces of the People's State: Upper Hesse (Oberhessen), and Lower Hesse, consisting of Starkenburg and Rhenish Hesse (Rheinhessen)

The predecessor of the People's State of Hesse was the Grand Duchy of Hesse (1806–1918), one of the constituent states of the German Empire. It consisted of two geographically separate areas: Upper Hesse in the north and Lower Hesse just to its south across the Main river. Lower Hesse had two provinces, Rhenish Hesse west of the Rhine and Starkenburg to its east. The capital was Darmstadt, in Starkenburg. The Grand Duchy's borders did not change with the transition to the People's State in 1918/19.

The Grand Duchy was a constitutional monarchy with a two-chamber parliament. The upper house was made up of royalty, clergy and members appointed for life by the grand duke. The lower house had 50 members elected by indirect vote. Its powers included approving taxes, the budget and new laws.

The last grand duke of Hesse was Ernest Louis (reigned 1892 to 1918). He was a grandson on his mother's side of Queen Victoria of England.

== Revolution of 1918 ==
In the final days of World War I, the revolution of 1918 brought down the German Empire and all of Germany's royal houses, including that of the Grand Duchy of Hesse. The revolution began at the end of October 1918 with a sailors' mutiny at Kiel. The rebellious sailors set up a workers' and soldiers' council and in early November spread the revolt across the rest of Germany. Emperor Wilhelm II fled to Holland on 10 November, and councils quickly took power from the existing military, royal and civil authorities with little resistance or bloodshed.

The revolution reached Hesse on 8 November 1918. The lower house of the Grand Duchy's parliament, meeting at Darmstadt, adopted a reform package in the afternoon that included plans to restructure the constitution and create a State Council that would work alongside the existing ministry. Grand Duke Ernest Louis appointed two members from each of the five parliamentary parties to the council, then in the evening met with three leading members of parliament to discuss the developing situation.

Events on the streets of Darmstadt overtook the men's deliberations. During the course of the evening, soldiers at the nearby Griesheim barracks elected a soldiers' council. At about midnight, some 5,000 soldiers from Griesheim and Darmstadt assembled in front of the New Palace, demanded the abdication of the Grand Duke and tried to storm the building. They were calmed by Heinrich Delp of the Social Democratic Party (SPD), who convinced them to come to a meeting with workers the next day.

Attendees at the 9 November assembly elected a workers', soldiers' and farmers' council made up of four SPD representatives and one from the liberal democratic camp. Wilhelm Knoblauch was chosen to lead the council. It declared Grand Duke Ernest Louis deposed, proclaimed Hesse-Darmstadt a free socialist republic and announced that it had taken over the government. An 18-member executive committee was created to see to public order, the food supply and demobilization of German Army members. Two days later, it handed the task of forming a provisional government to Carl Ulrich (SPD). He chose two ministers from the SPD, two from the left-liberal German Democratic Party (DDP) and one from the Catholic Centre Party. On 12 November, Ernest Louis accepted that he had no choice other than to renounce the throne, but he refused to formally abdicate.

Workers' and soldiers' councils were formed in other cities across Hesse, including at Mainz in Rhenish Hesse and Giessen in Upper Hesse. In rural areas, farmers formed their own councils or joined with workers. Most Hessian councils were dominated by the SPD, which wanted to establish a parliamentary democracy in which all classes were represented. Communists and the left wing of the Independent Social Democratic Party (USPD) sought a soviet republic controlled by the workers' councils, but they had relatively few supporters. The councils intervened little in the existing administrative apparatus and held executive power only until the election of the constituent assembly on 26 January 1919. After that point their powers were gradually withdrawn.

== Constitution ==
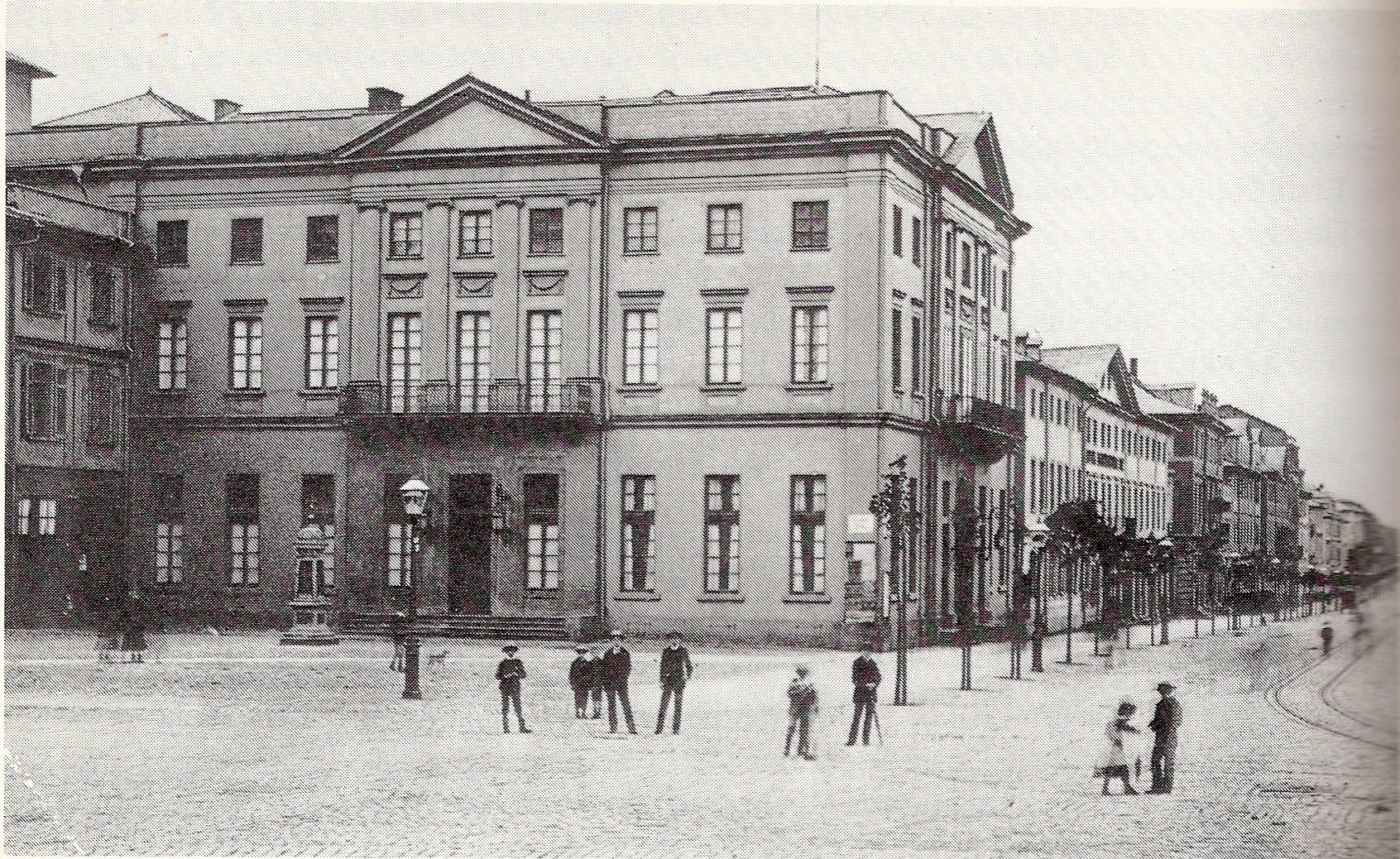
The Ständehaus on the Luisenplatz in Darmstadt (1888), seat of the Hessian Landtag

Hesse's constituent assembly, called the People's Chamber (Volkskammer), was elected under proportional representation by all Hessian citizens, both female and male, who were at least 20 years of age. Of its 70 seats, 57 went to the Social Democratic Party, German Democratic Party and Centre Party, the three Weimar Coalition parties which also controlled the Weimar National Assembly, the national parliament elected the week before to write a constitution for the new republic. Hesse's Volkskammer chose Carl Ulrich of the SPD as president and on 20 February 1919 approved a provisional constitution for the state.

Hesse's permanent constitution, which came into effect on 12 December 1919, provided for a single-chamber Landtag elected under the same provisions as the constituent assembly. The Landtag elected the state president from among its members and was responsible for all legislative activity. The state president chose ministers with the approval of the Landtag. The ministry held executive power, was responsible to the Landtag, could initiate legislation and in emergencies issue decrees with the force of law as long as they did not violate the constitution. The constitution included provisions for referendums.

The Volkskammer continued to act as Hesse's legislature until after the election to the first Landtag on 27 November 1921.

== Weimar Republic ==
=== French Occupation ===
Under the terms of the Treaty of Versailles, which became effective in January 1920, German territory west of the Rhine river was demilitarized and occupied by troops of the victorious Allies, as were bridgeheads radiating out 30 kilometers east of the Rhine from four cities along the river. In Hesse, the regions affected were Rhenish Hesse and the northwest portion of Starkenburg, which was in the Mainz bridgehead. Both areas were occupied by the French, whose headquarters was at Mainz. Darmstadt was also occupied for six weeks beginning on 6 April 1920 after German troops, in contravention of the Versailles Treaty, entered part of the demilitarized zone north of Hesse to suppress a workers' uprising in the Ruhr. The occupation of the Rhineland and bridgeheads ended in June 1930.

=== Separatist movements ===
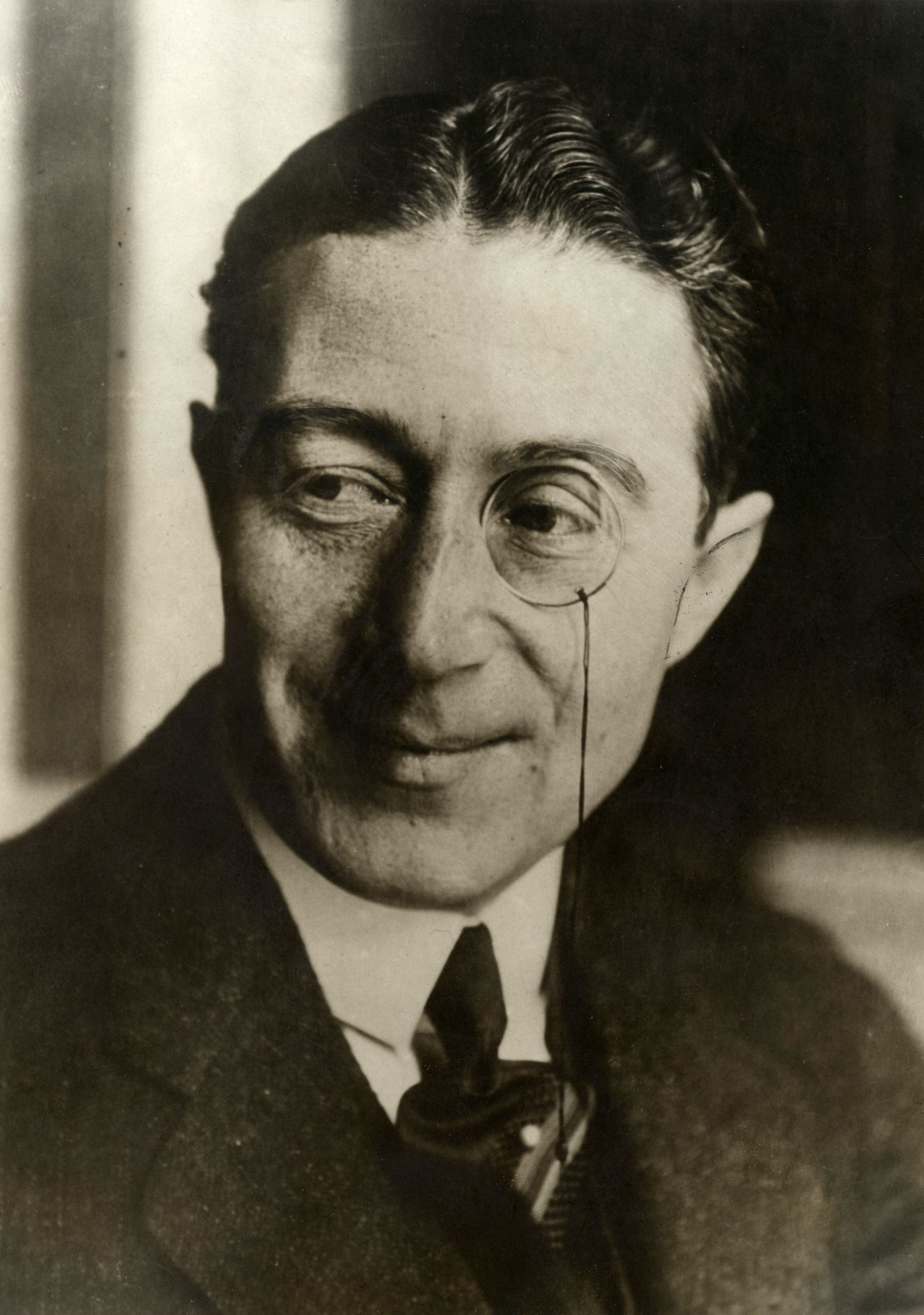
Hans Dorten, a major figure in the Rhenish separatist movement, in 1928

In May 1919 Hans Adam Dorten, working from Wiesbaden, attempted to establish an independent Rhenish Republic as part of postwar Germany. With the tacit cooperation of French occupation officials, he had placards proclaiming the new republic posted in Wiesbaden, Aachen, Mainz und Speyer on the night of May 31 to June 1. Along with Rhenish Hesse, the republic was to incorporate the Rhine Province of Prussia and the Rhenish Palatinate, which belonged to Bavaria. The proclamation received little support from the populace and was actively opposed even by some separatists because it had French backing. A protest strike was called at Mainz, and Bernhard Adelung, president of Hesse's People's Chamber, and five other members of the Chamber were arrested by the French for their outspoken opposition to the attempted coup. The entire effort collapsed within a few days.

The separatist movement revived following the French and Belgian occupation of the Ruhr in January 1923. French occupation authorities further restricted freedom of the press and assembly. Resistance, even passive, could lead to expulsion from French occupied territory. Approximately 25,000 citizens of Rhenish Hesse, including Mainz's mayor and police chief and their families, were expelled . At the same time, a severe economic crisis and unprecedented hyperinflation affected all of Germany. In Mainz, protests against food shortages and high prices became violent in early August.

Separatists hoped that detaching the Rhineland from the rest of Germany would help the region escape Germany's economic ills. They declared a Rhenish Republic in October that included virtually all of the occupied west bank. France helped the armed insurgents, who numbered several thousand, with materials and propaganda. The putschists took over public buildings across the region, including at Mainz. Because of the Treaty of Versailles' demilitarization provisions, the German government was unable to act against the uprising, but as in 1919, the majority of people of the region opposed the separatists, often actively. The attempt collapsed in mid-November.

=== Landtag and state governments ===
With a degree of stability that was remarkable for the Weimar Republic, the coalition of the SPD, DDP and Centre Party (Weimar Coalition) remained in control of the Hessian Landtag until shortly after Adolf Hitler and the Nazi Party (NSDAP) took control of Germany in 1933. Karl Ulrich was state president until February 1928, when he stepped down at the age of 75. The Landtag then elected Bernhard Adelung, also of the SPD, to succeed him. In the 1931 election, the Nazi Party surged to become the largest in the Landtag with 37% of the vote and 27 seats. The Communist Party won 14% of the vote and 10 seats, enough for the two ideologically opposed parties to form a negative (blocking) majority. The Weimar Coalition parties dropped to 36.4% and 27 seats, but because of the combined strength of the NSDAP and KPD, no ruling coalition could be formed, and the Adelung government remained in place on a caretaker basis. The Hessian State Court declared the 1931 election invalid on a complaint from the Economic Party, which had failed to be put on the ballot. The Nazis picked up five additional seats in the new election in June 1932, but it was not enough to break the parliamentary impasse, and the Adelung government continued in its caretaker role. The situation largely paralyzed the legislature. Motions of censure and dismissal along with sometimes violent clashes between members became the order of the day.

Landtag election results by seats
Party	1919	1921	1924	1927	1931	1932	1933 (Note: Restructuring of the Landtag on the basis of the Reichstag election of 5 March 1933)
Social Democratic Party (SPD)	31	24	26	24	16	17	11
Independent Social Democratic Party (USPD)	1	2	.	.	.		.
Centre Party (Z)	13	13	11	13	10	10	7
German National People's Party (DNVP)	5	3	5	3	1	1	1
Agricultural League	.	11	9	9	2		.
Communist Party (KPD)	.	2	4	6	10	7	[5] (Note: The Nazi Party excluded the KPD members following the reconfiguration of the Landtag which took place after the 5 March 1933 Reichstag election.)
German People's Party (DVP)	7	10	8	7	1	2	–
German Democratic Party (DDP)	13	5	6	5	1	2	–
Christian Social People's Service (CSVD)	.	.	.	.	1	2	–
Nazi Party (NSDAP)	.	.	1	.	27	32	26
People's Justice Party (VRP)	.	.	.	3	–		
Others	.	–	–	.	1	1	–

== Nazi era ==
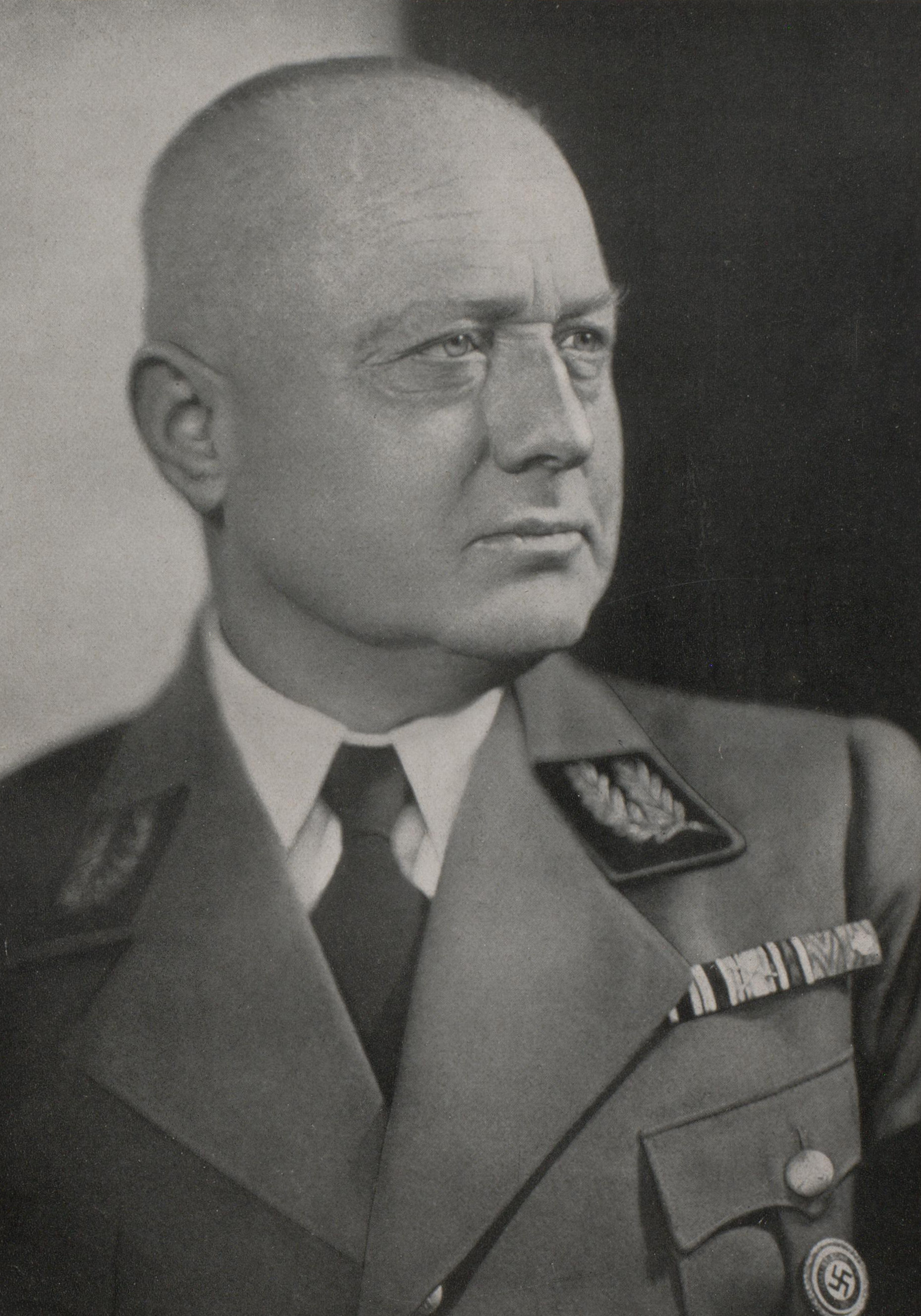
Jakob Sprenger, the Gauleiter of Gau Hesse-Nassau.

Adolf Hitler's appointment to the Reich chancellorship on 30 January 1933 marked the beginning of the end of the individual German states' sovereignty. The national Reichstag was dissolved and a new election held on 5 March. The NSDAP received 47.4% of the vote in Hesse, higher than the 44% nationally. Hesse's Landtag was reconfigured based on the results of the Reichstag election, giving the NSDAP 47% of the seats (26 of 55, reduced from 70 in previous elections). The Landtag elected Ferdinand Werner of the NSDAP state president on 13 March. The Enabling Act of 24 March and the Gleichschaltungsgesetz (Law for the Coordination of the States) of 31 March effectively rendered the states meaningless.

Jakob Sprenger, the Gauleiter of Gau Hesse-Nassau, was appointed Reichsstatthalter (Reich governor) of Hesse on 5 May 1933. Over the course of the year, Sprenger reduced the state's government through various ordinances and personnel decisions. He claimed the right to make such decisions even when his position as Reichsstatthalter did not entitle him to do so. By the end of the year, he had reduced the number of ministers from five to one minister plus a state secretary, and had reduced the number of ministerial civil servants from 40 to nine. All ministries were united into a single Hessian State Ministry, and Werner lost the title of state president.

In the process, Sprenger prevailed in a personal power struggle with Werner. Although Werner was a Nazi party member, he attempted to maintain a state administration which was more like the pre-Nazi form, and he supported police commissioner Werner Best against the Sturmabteilung (SA). Above all, Werner fought against Sprenger's attempts to merge Hesse with the other territories of the Gau Hesse-Nassau, which were in the southern portion of the Prussian province of Hesse-Nassau. The conflict escalated when Sprenger sought to unite the four chambers of commerce within the Gau. Werner appealed directly to Adolf Hitler but without success. Finally, on 20 September 1933, Sprenger forced Werner to retire and appointed Philipp Wilhelm Jung in his place. He bore only the title of state minister.

The Law on the Reconstruction of the Reich of 30 January 1934 abolished Hesse's Landtag and transferred its sovereignty to the Reich. The state government was subordinated to the Reich government, although formally it remained a self-governing unit. After Sprenger and Jung came into conflict with one another at the start of 1935, Hitler appointed Sprenger head of government in Hesse in the Reichsstatthalter Law. Hesse was the second state in Germany, after the Free State of Saxony, in which the leadership of the local Nazi Gau completely replaced the local state government. The deputy Gauleiter Heinrich Reiner became state secretary in Sprenger's cabinet, which contained no other ministers.

On 1 April 1937, Sprenger promulgated a law abolishing the provinces of Upper Hesse, Rhenish Hesse, and Starkenburg.

=== Post-War reorganization ===
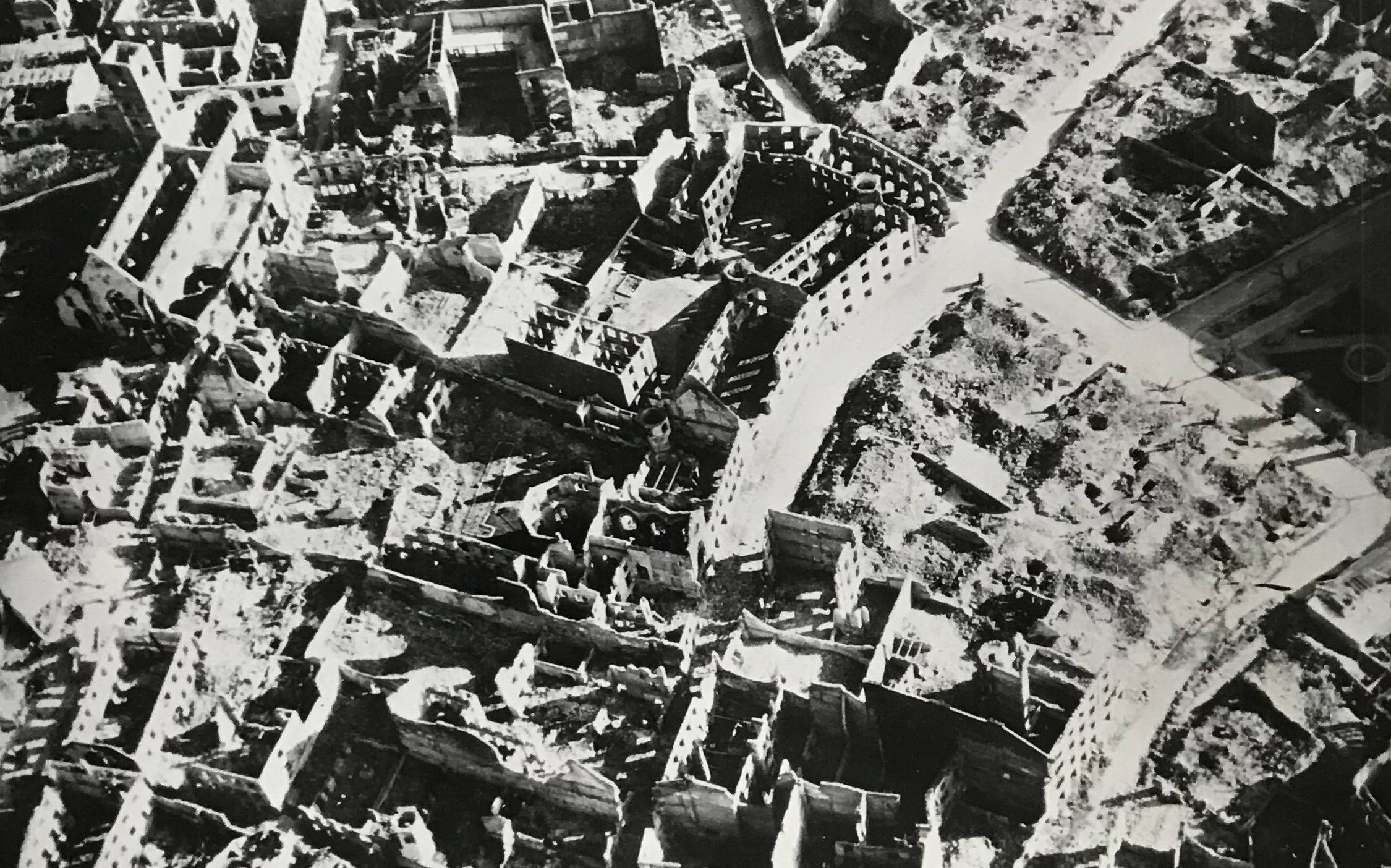
Aerial view of central Mainz after the bombing of 27 February 1945

After the German surrender in May 1945 at the end of World War II, the Rhine river formed the boundary between the French and American occupation zones, which put Rhenish Hesse in the French zone while the rest of the state lay in the American Zone.

On 14 April 1945, the US military government entrusted Ludwig Bergsträsser with the task of building a regional administration as chairman of a "German Government" based in Darmstadt. On 8 August, Bergsträsser's authority was extended over the whole of the former provinces of Starkenburg and Upper Hesse, and his administration was renamed the "German Government of the State of Hesse" (Deutsche Regierung des Landes Hessen).

The proclamation of Greater Hesse by the American military administration on 19 September 1945 combined Upper Hesse, Starkenburg and the part of Rhenish Hesse that lay east of the Rhine with the former Prussian province of Hesse-Nassau. The state took its modern name of Hesse on 1 December 1946. The majority of Rhenish Hesse became part of the new state of Rhineland-Palatinate.

== Heads of government ==
Name	Portrait	Term of office	Party	Coalition	Title
Carl Ulrich		1919–1928	SPD	SPD, DDP, Centre	State President from 1920
Bernhard Adelung		1928–1933	SPD	SPD, DDP, Centre	State President
Ferdinand Werner		1933	NSDAP	NSDAP	State President, then Minister President
Philipp Wilhelm Jung		1933–1935	NSDAP	NSDAP	Minister President
Jakob Sprenger		1935–1945	NSDAP	NSDAP	Reichsstatthalter from May 1933; also Minister President from March 1935

== Administrative divisions ==
The People's State of Hesse inherited the Grand Duchy of Hesse's division into three provinces: Starkenburg, Rhenish Hesse, and Upper Hesse, which were themselves divided into a total of eighteen Kreise (districts). The state's territory also included eight exclaves of Baden and Prussia, and there were eleven Hessian enclaves within Baden.

After the abolition of provincial and district councils in 1936, the provinces were eliminated in 1937. In 1938, there was a comprehensive reform at the district level. The districts of Bensheim, Schotten, and Oppenheim were abolished on 1 November 1938, reducing the total number of districts to fifteen. At the same time, the cities of Darmstadt, Giessen, Mainz, Offenbach am Main, and Worms were made independent Stadtkreise (urban districts). From 1 January 1939, all Kreise were renamed Landkreise (rural districts). This arrangement of the districts remained in place until the end of the Second World War in 1945.

- Upper Hesse (Capital: Giessen)
  - Stadtkreis Giessen (from 1938)
  - Kreis Alsfeld
  - Kreis Büdingen
  - Kreis Friedberg
  - Kreis Giessen
  - Kreis Lauterbach
  - Kreis Schotten (until 1938)
- Rhenish Hesse (Capital: Mainz)
  - Stadtkreis Mainz (from 1938)
  - Stadtkreis Worms (from 1938)
  - Kreis Alzey
  - Kreis Bingen
  - Kreis Mainz
  - Kreis Oppenheim (until 1938)
  - Kreis Worms
- Starkenburg (Capital: Darmstadt)
  - Stadtkreis Darmstadt (from 1938)
  - Stadtkreis Offenbach am Main (from 1938)
  - Kreis Erbach
  - Kreis Darmstadt
  - Kreis Dieburg
  - Kreis Groß-Gerau
  - Kreis Offenbach
  - Kreis Bensheim (until 1938)
  - Kreis Heppenheim (merged with Bensheim in 1938 to form Landkreis Bergstraße)

== Bibliography ==
- Knöpp, Friedrich (1983). "Der Volksstaat Hessen 1918–1933". In Schultz, Uwe (ed.). Die Geschichte Hessens. Stuttgart: Theiss. pp. 217–231. ISBN 3-8062-0332-6.
- Rebentisch, Dieter (1978). "Der Gau Hessen-Nassau und die nationalsozialistische Reichsreform". Nassauische Annalen. 89: 128–162.
