= Jakob Sprenger =

German Nazi Party official (1884–1945)

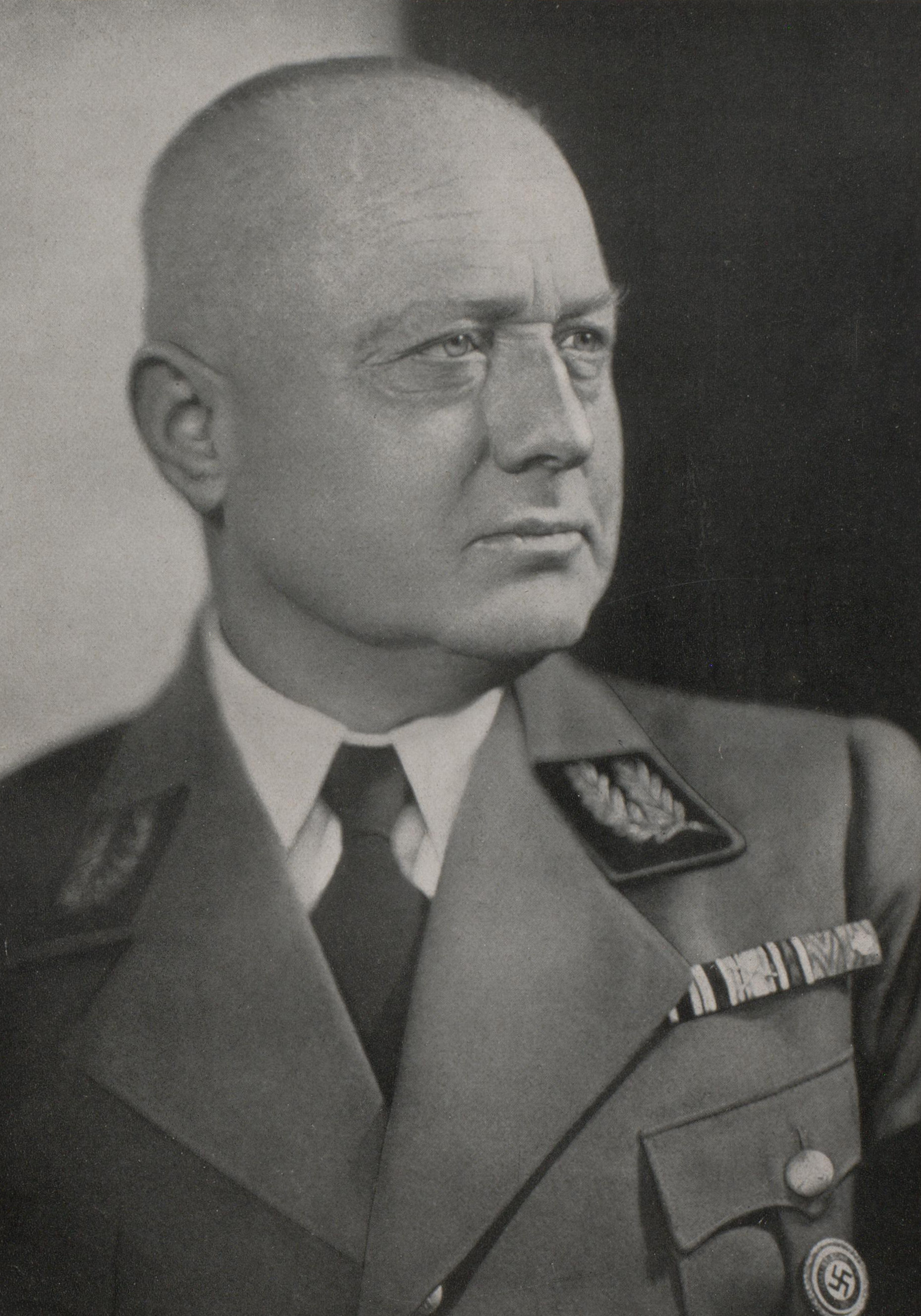
- Sprenger in 1942

Gauleiter of Hesse-Nassau South
- In office 1 April 1927 – 1 January 1933
- Preceded by: Karl Linder
- Succeeded by: Position abolished

Gauleiter of Gau Hesse-Nassau
- In office 1 January 1933 – 7 May 1945
- Preceded by: Position created
- Succeeded by: Position abolished

Reichsstatthalter of the People's State of Hesse
- In office 5 May 1933 – 7 May 1945
- Preceded by: Position created
- Succeeded by: Position abolished

Minister-President of the People's State of Hesse
- In office 1 March 1935 – 25 March 1945
- Preceded by: Philipp Wilhelm Jung
- Succeeded by: Heinrich Reiner (acting)

Oberpräsident of the Province of Nassau
- In office 1 July 1944 – 24 April 1945
- Preceded by: Position created
- Succeeded by: Hans Bredow

Personal details
- Born: 27 July 1884 Oberhausen, Kingdom of Bavaria, Germany
- Died: 7 May 1945 (aged 60) Kössen, Nazi Germany
- Party: National Socialist German Workers' Party (NSDAP)
- Other political affiliations: German Party; National Socialist Freedom Party
- Occupation: Postal official

Military service
- Allegiance: German Empire
- Branch/service: Imperial German Army
- Years of service: 1914–1919
- Rank: Leutnant
- Unit: 18th Royal Bavarian Infantry Regiment; 1st Royal Bavarian Landsturm Regiment
- Battles/wars: World War I
- Awards: Iron Cross, 2nd class

Jakob Sprenger (24 July 1884 – 7 May 1945) was a Nazi Party official and politician who was the Party's Gauleiter of Hesse-Nassau South from 1927 to 1933 and Gau Hesse-Nassau from 1933 to 1945. He was also the Reichsstatthalter (Reich Governor) and Minister-President of the People's State of Hesse, the Oberpräsident of the Prussian Province of Nassau and an SA-Obergruppenführer.

== Early life ==
Sprenger, the son of a farmer, was born in Oberhausen in the Rhenish Palatinate. He attended volksschule there and after graduating from the gymnasium in Bad Bergzabern in 1901, he served as a one-year volunteer with the 18th Royal Bavarian Infantry Regiment “Prince Ludwig Ferdinand,” headquartered in Landau. From 1902 he was employed in the administrative service of the Imperial Postal Service, first in Mannheim, then in Hamburg and from October 1912 in Frankfurt.

Sprenger volunteered for service in the First World War in August 1914. He was assigned to his old regiment as an Offizierstellvertreter (Officer Deputy) training volunteers and reservists. He was then deployed to the western front and was wounded in action in November 1914, losing a toe on his right foot. He was decorated for valor and awarded the Iron Cross 2nd Class. After discharge from the hospital in January 1915, he was assigned as a zugführer (platoon leader) with a machine gun company. Promoted to Leutnant in April 1916, he was deployed to the eastern front in June 1916 with the 1st Royal Bavarian Landsturm Regiment. He subsequently served as a deputy company commander and a poison gas defense officer (gasschutzoffizier) in Pinsk and Rivne in Ukraine. After the war ended, he returned to Germany in December 1918. Discharged from the service in July 1919, he resumed his career as a postal official in Frankfurt in December.

== Nazi career ==
In 1922, Sprenger became a member of the Nazi Party. When the Party was banned in the wake of the failed Beer Hall Putsch, he briefly joined the German Party (Deutsche Partei, DP) a Nazi front organization in January 1924. He became the leader of the DP in Frankfurt, Hesse, and Hesse-Nassau, and worked as a campaign speaker. In June of that year, he gravitated to the National Socialist Freedom Party, another Nazi front group, and was put on its executive board. After co-founding its Ortsgruppe (Local Group) in Frankfurt, Sprenger became the Bezirksleiter (District Leader) for Frankfurt, Hesse, and Hesse-Nassau. On 28 April 1925 he was elected to the Frankfurt City Council and served there until 1933. Sprenger formally rejoined the Nazi Party on 14 August 1925 (membership number 17,009). He was anti-Semitic, and rose quickly through the ranks. He immediately was made Ortsgruppenleiter (Local Group Leader) and SA leader of Frankfurt and became a Bezirksleiter in Hesse-Nassau South on 31 October 1926. He was appointed Gauleiter of Hesse-Nassau South on 1 April 1927, succeeding Karl Linder. On 17 November 1929, he became a member of the municipal Landtag of Wiesbaden and the provincial Landtag of Hesse-Nassau. In January 1930 he became the Nazi faction leader in both bodies and, in addition, was made a member of the Prussian State Council.

In September 1930, Sprenger was elected as a member of the Reichstag for electoral constituency 19, Hesse-Nassau, and retained this seat until his death in May 1945. He would become the Nazi faction's specialist on civil service issues and was given a seat on the Reichstag Committee on Civil Service Matters. The same year, he founded a Nazi newspaper in Frankfurt called Frankfurter Volksblatt. From 1930 to 1933 he also sat on the Board of Directors of the German Postal Service, though leaving his employment with the postal service in November 1932. In early 1931, Sprenger joined the National Socialist Motor Corps with membership number 5. In April 1931, Sprenger became the Reich Specialist for Civil Service Questions in the Party Reichsleitung (National Leadership). He would become head of its Civil Service Department from September 1931 through July 1933. Sprenger became the leader of the German Civil Servants Association from April to June 1933, and then continued as the Honorary President of the German Civil Service through the end of the Nazi regime. He was also made a member of the Academy for German Law.

On 15 July 1932 came his appointment as Landesinspekteur-Southwest. In this position, he had oversight responsibility for his Gau and four others (Baden, Hesse-Darmstadt, Hesse-Nassau North & Württemberg-Hohenzollern). This was a short-lived initiative by Gregor Strasser to centralize control over the Gaue. However, it was unpopular with the Gauleiters and was repealed on Strasser's fall from power in December 1932. Sprenger then returned to his Gauleiter position in Hesse-Nassau South.

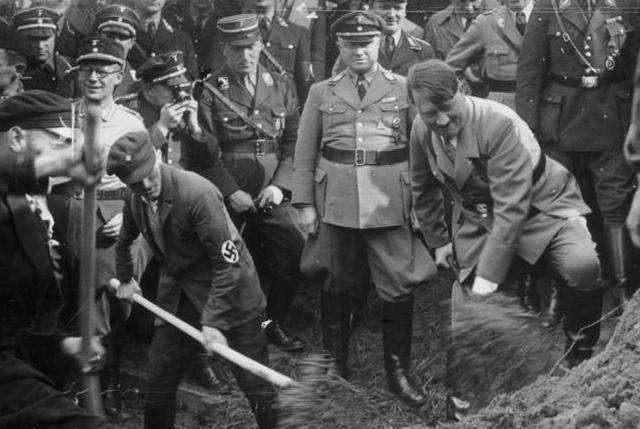
Jakob Sprenger (center) with Adolf Hitler at the ceremonial groundbreaking for the Frankfurt-Darmstadt Reichsautobahn, 23 September 1933.

When his Gau was merged with the neighboring Gau of Hesse-Darmstadt (comprising the federal People's State of Hesse) on 1 January 1933, Sprenger became the Gauleiter of the unified Gau Hesse-Nassau. On 10 April 1933, he became the leader of the Nazi faction in the Prussian State Council. On 5 May 1933, he was appointed Reichsstatthalter (Reich Governor) of the People's State of Hesse. In the process of the Gleichschaltung, in particular due to the Reichsstatthaltergesetz (Reich Governors Law) of 30 January 1935, he was also appointed Minister-President and took over leadership of the state government from Philipp Wilhelm Jung on 1 March 1935. Sprenger was promoted to SA-Obergruppenführer on 9 November 1938. He was a holder of the Golden Party Badge.

== Involvement in euthanasia and the Holocaust ==
In the Hessian town of Hadamar, the psychiatric clinic there was converted into the Hadamar Killing Facility where over 14,000 mentally and physically disabled men, women and children were murdered with either poisonous gas or lethal injection as part of the Aktion T4 program between January 1941 and March 1945. This certainly was done with the knowledge of Sprenger, the chief Party and government official in the region.

It is estimated that some 7,000 Jews emigrated from Frankfurt in the time between Kristallnacht in November 1938 and the formal ban on Jewish emigration of 23 October 1941. From that time forward, Jews were rounded up and deported by train from Frankfurt to ghettos and extermination camps in the east. It is estimated that over 10,600 Jews were deported and that only about 600 Frankfurt Jews survived the war. In May 1943, Sprenger declared Frankfurt to be "Judenfrei".

== War years ==
When the Second World War broke out on 1 September 1939, Sprenger was named Reich Defense Commissioner for Wehrkreis (Military District) XII, based in Wiesbaden. This encompassed the western half of his Gau along with Gau Koblenz-Trier, Gau Saarpfalz and part of Gau Baden. In this new position, Sprenger had responsibility for civil defense including air defense and evacuation measures, as well as administration of wartime rationing and suppression of black market activity. On 16 November 1942, the jurisdiction of the Reich Defense Commissioners was changed from the Wehrkreis to the Gau level, and he remained Commissioner for only his Gau of Hesse-Nassau. In 1943, the Oberpräsident (High President) of the Prussian Province of Hesse-Nassau, Philipp von Hessen, fell out of favor and was removed from office. Subsequently, the province was partitioned in two, effective 1 July 1944, and Sprenger was appointed Oberpräsident of the new Prussian Province of Nassau. He thus united under his control the highest party and governmental offices in the province, as he had already done in the State of Hesse. On 25 September 1944, Sprenger became commander of the Volkssturm forces in his Gau.

On 15 March 1945, with U.S. Army forces already across the Rhine river, Sprenger issued orders to his Kreisleiters on the need to keep the German population “in check” by having the Gestapo arrest “rumor mongers” and send them to concentration camps. He also ordered the destruction of secret documents relating to concentration camps and the “extermination of some families.” The memo also stated:

Germans who do not defend themselves on the approach of the enemy or who wish to flee, are to be shot down ruthlessly, or, where suitable, hanged to frighten the population.

As American armed forces approached Frankfurt, Sprenger issued further orders on 23 March 1945 prohibiting any able-bodied man or woman from leaving the city. Despite this, on the night of 25 to 26 March just before the start of the Battle of Frankfurt, Sprenger himself fled from Frankfurt to Kössen in eastern Tyrol, Austria where the Russians and U.S. Army were executing a pincer maneuver to envelop the whole country. Trapped, Sprenger and his wife committed suicide by ingesting poison on 7 May 1945.

== See also ==
- List of Gauleiters

== Sources ==
- Goeschel, Christian (2009). Suicide in Nazi Germany. OUP Oxford. ISBN 978-0191567568.
- Höffkes, Karl (1986). Hitlers Politische Generale. Die Gauleiter des Dritten Reiches: ein biographisches Nachschlagewerk. Tübingen: Grabert-Verlag. ISBN 3-87847-163-7.
- Miller, Michael D.; Schulz, Andreas (2021). Gauleiter: The Regional Leaders of the Nazi Party and Their Deputies, 1925 - 1945. Vol. 3 (Fritz Sauckel - Hans Zimmermann). Fonthill Media. ISBN 978-1-781-55826-3.
- Orlow, Dietrich (1969). The History of the Nazi Party: 1919–1933. University of Pittsburgh Press. ISBN 0-8229-3183-4.
