= Gau Hesse-Nassau =

Administrative division of Nazi Germany

- Gau of Nazi Germany
- 1933–1945
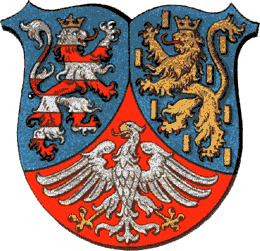
- Flag Coat of arms

- Capital: Frankfurt
- Government
- Gauleiter
  - 1933–1945: Jakob Sprenger
- History
  - Establishment: 1 January 1933
  - Disestablishment: 8 May 1945
Preceded by	Succeeded by
Hesse-Nassau; People's State of Hesse	Greater Hesse
- Today part of: Germany

The Gau Hesse-Nassau (German: Gau Hessen-Nassau) was an administrative division of Nazi Germany from 1933 to 1945. It was formed by the merger of two separate Gaue comprising the People's State of Hesse (also known as Hesse-Darmstadt) and the southern parts of the Prussian province of Hesse-Nassau that were, from 1927 to 1933, the regional subdivisions of the Nazi Party in those areas.

== History ==
The Nazi Gau (plural Gaue) system was originally established in a party conference on 22 May 1926, in order to improve administration of the party structure. From 1933 onwards, after the Nazi seizure of power, the Gaue increasingly replaced the German states as administrative subdivisions in Germany.

At the head of each Gau stood a Gauleiter, a position which became increasingly more powerful, especially after the outbreak of the Second World War, with little interference from above. Local Gauleiters often held government positions as well as party ones and were in charge of, among other things, propaganda and surveillance and, from September 1944 onward, the Volkssturm and the defense of the Gau.

The position of Gauleiter in Hesse-Nassau was held by Jakob Sprenger throughout the history of the Gau. Sprenger and his wife committed suicide in Tyrol on 7 May 1945, where they had gone into hiding.
