= List of Reichstag deputies in the Third Reich (1st electoral term) =

This is a list of Reichstag deputies in the Third Reich (1st electoral term). The Reichstag of Nazi Germany existed from 1933 to 1945. Its 1st electoral term (Note: Also sometimes referred to as the 8th electoral term of the Weimar Republic.) began with the parliamentary election of 5 March 1933 and lasted until the members were replaced in the election of 12 November 1933.

== Election ==
The 5 March 1933 parliamentary election was the first to be held following Adolf Hitler's appointment as chancellor of Germany on 30 January 1933. One of Hitler's first objectives on taking office was the elimination of the Reichstag as both a locus of opposition and as a necessary component for governing. A condition for his acceptance of the chancellorship was the dissolution of the Reichstag and the calling of a new election. He believed that an anticipated increase in the vote for his Nazi Party would contribute an air of greater legitimacy to his government.

The election took place less than one week after the Reichstag fire of 27 February. In response, Hitler's government drafted the Reichstag Fire Decree, which Reich President Paul von Hindenburg enacted the next day as an emergency presidential proclamation. It suspended most of the civil liberties guaranteed by the Weimar Constitution, including habeas corpus, inviolability of residence, secrecy of the post and telephone, freedom of expression and of the press, the right to public assembly and the right of free association.

The impact of the decree fell heavily on the Nazis' opponents, particularly the Communists (KPD) and the Social Democrats (SPD). The government accused the Communists of deliberately setting the Reichstag fire and it banned their party newspaper. Nazi Sturmabteilung (SA) cadres, who were enrolled and armed as auxiliary police, raided party offices and broke up campaign rallies. Though the KPD was not banned outright, its individual members were persecuted as criminals who had planned illegal acts. Many Communist Party leaders and candidates were arrested, including the party chairman and the floor leader of its Reichstag faction. Their voters were harassed and intimidated, and the electoral campaign took place in an atmosphere of fear, violence and terror that persisted beyond the election. Ten thousand Communists were in custody by 15 March. Due to the subsequent enactment of the Law Against the Formation of Parties on 14 July 1933, this was to be the last multi-party election in Germany until after the fall of the Nazi regime in May 1945.

== Results ==
According to the official election results, over 39.6 million votes were cast (88.7% turnout). Nearly 44% of the vote was won by Hitler's Nazi Party and just under 8% went to his coalition partner, the German National People's Party (DNVP). Hitler thus secured a working parliamentary majority for his government. The SPD, the main opposition party, obtained 18.3% and the KPD, with many of their candidates under arrest or in hiding, still managed to obtain 12.3%. The Catholic Centre Party came in at 11.3%, and all other parties fell below 2.75%.

Reichstag Election Results, 5 March 1933
Party	Votes	Percent	Seats
Nazi Party (NSDAP)	17,277,180	43.91	288
Social Democratic Party (SPD)	7,181,629	18.25	120
Communist Party of Germany (KPD)	4,848,058	12.32	81
Centre Party (Centre)	4,424,905	11.25	73
German National People's Party (DNVP)	3,136,760	7.97	52
Bavarian People's Party (BVP)	1,073,552	2.73	19
German People's Party (DVP)	432,312	1.10	2
Christian Social People's Service (CSVD)	383,999	.98	4
German State Party (DStP)	334,242	.85	5
German Farmers' Party (DBP)	114,048	.29	2
Agricultural League (LB)	83,839	.21	1
Others	52,807	.13	0
Total	39,343,331	100	647

== Sessions ==
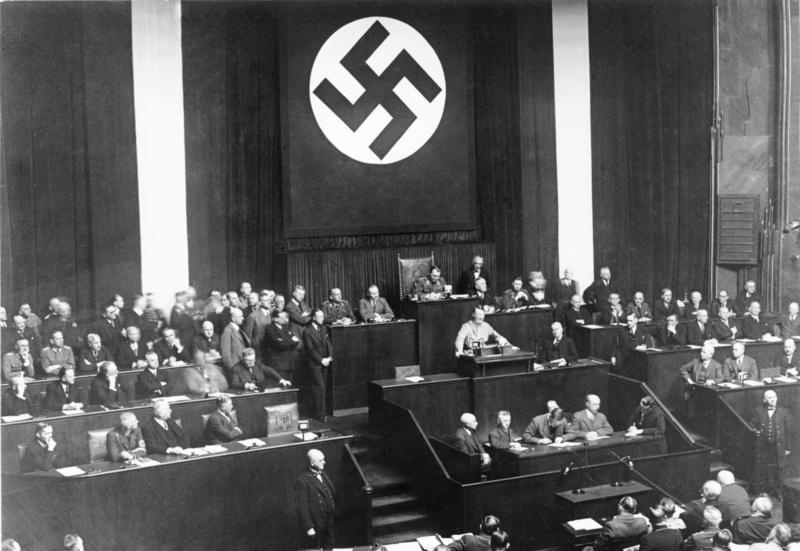
Adolf Hitler speaking in favor of the Enabling Act at the Reichstag session of 23 March 1933

The Reichstag members of the 1st electoral term met for only three sessions, the first being on 21 March 1933 and the last being on 17 May 1933. The opening ceremonies of the first session were held at the Garrison Church in Potsdam. The deputies then reconvened for the first business session at the Kroll Opera House in Berlin, which remained the venue for the next sessions due to the extensive damage done to the Reichstag building by the fire.

The Reichstag passed only one law during its term. This was the Enabling Act of 1933, passed at the second session on 23 March 1933 by a vote of 444 to 94. This critical measure empowered the chancellor and his cabinet to enact legislation, including laws deviating from or altering the constitution, without the consent of the Reichstag for a period of four years. It was a major step in the establishment of the Nazi dictatorship.

Reichstag Sessions – 2nd Electoral Term
Session	Date	Notable Actions
1	21 March 1933	Hermann Göring is elected Reichstag president.
2	23 March 1933	The Reichstag passes the Enabling Act, empowering the cabinet to enact laws by decree.
3	17 May 1933	Hitler denounces the limitations of the Treaty of Versailles and advocates for German rearmament.

== Presidium ==
The Reichstag Presidium, consisting of a president and three vice-presidents, was elected en bloc at the first session on 21 March 1933.

Presidium of the Reichstag
Title	Incumbent
President	Hermann Göring (NSDAP)
First Vice-president	Thomas Eßer (Centre)
Second Vice-president	Walther Graefe (DNVP)
Third Vice-president	Ernst Zörner (NSDAP)

== Members ==
A total of 647 Reichstag deputies were elected on 5 March 1933. Fifty-five deputies were elected from the parties' national electoral lists (Reichswahlvorschlage) and the remainder from the 35 individual electoral constituencies. Just a few days after the election, the Reich government revoked the mandates of the eighty-one KPD deputies, many of whom had already been arrested on the basis of the Reichstag Fire Decree, and they were never allowed to take their seats. A listing of all the Reichstag members and their party designation follows. Changes in membership due to deaths or resignations occurring up until 12 November 1933, and the resulting replacements, are annotated in the "Notes" column.

=== Reichswahlvorschlage (Reich Electoral Lists) ===
The Reichswahlvorschlage were allocated 55 seats.

Name	Image	Birth	Death	Party	Notes
Paul Bausch		1895	1981	CSVD	
Franz Behrens		1872	1943	CSVD	
Emil Berndt		1874	1954	DNVP	
Philipp Bouhler		1899	1945	NSDAP	
Hugo Bruckmann		1863	1941	NSDAP	
Heinrich Brüning		1885	1970	Centre	
Walter Buch		1883	1949	NSDAP	
Richard Walther Darré		1895	1953	NSDAP	
Hermann Dietrich		1879	1954	DStP	
Wilhelm Dittmann		1874	1954	SPD	
Hermann Esser		1900	1981	NSDAP	Resigned, 24 May 1933
Anton Fehr		1881	1954	DBP	
Peter Graßmann		1873	1939	SPD	
Theo Habicht		1898	1944	NSDAP	
Gustav Harmony		1875	1959	DNVP	
Otto Hembeck		1881	1958	DNVP	
Theodor Heuss		1884	1963	DStP	
Konstantin Hierl		1875	1955	NSDAP	
Curt Hoff		1888	1950	Centre	Replaced Florian Klöckner, 20 July 1933
Otto Hugo		1878	1942	DVP	
Heinz-Hugo John		1904	1944	NSDAP	
Ludwig Kaas		1881	1952	Centre	
Fritz Kahmann		1896	1978	KPD	Mandate revoked
Wilhelm Keppler		1882	1960	NSDAP	
Florian Klöckner		1868	1947	Centre	Resigned, 30 June 1933
Fritz Theodor Kuhnen		1879	1947	Centre	
Heinrich Landahl		1895	1971	DStP	
Otto Landsberg		1869	1957	SPD	
Thusnelda Lang-Brumann		1880	1953	BVP	
Ernst Lemmer		1898	1970	DStP	
Magnus von Levetzow		1871	1939	NSDAP	
Reinhold Meier		1889	1971	DStP	
Ludwig Marum		1882	1934	SPD	
Alfred Möllers		1883	1969	DNVP	
Theodor Neubauer		1890	1945	KPD	Mandate revoked
Franz von Papen		1879	1969	DNVP	
Alfred Pfaff		1872	1954	NSDAP	
Franz Pfeffer von Salomon		1888	1968	NSDAP	
Reinhold Quaatz		1876	1953	DNVP	
Eugen Graf von Quadt zu Wykradt und Isny		1887	1940	BVP	
Franz Scheffel		1873	1967	SPD	
John Schehr		1896	1934	KPD	Mandate revoked
Baldur von Schirach		1907	1974	NSDAP	
Paul Schultze-Naumburg		1869	1949	NSDAP	
Franz Xaver Schwarz		1875	1947	NSDAP	
Franz Seldte		1882	1947	DNVP	
Friedrich Stampfer		1874	1957	SPD	
Helmut Stellrecht		1898	1987	NSDAP	Replaced Hermann Esser, 10 June 1933
Fritz Tarnow		1880	1951	SPD	
Georg Usadel		1900	1941	NSDAP	
Heinrich Vockel		1892	1968	Centre	
Josias zu Waldeck und Pyrmont		1896	1967	NSDAP	
Walter Weidauer		1899	1986	KPD	Mandate revoked
Wilhelm Weiß		1892	1950	NSDAP	
August Christian Winkler		1900	1961	Centre	
Joseph Wirth		1879	1956	Centre	
Ernst Wollweber		1898	1967	KPD	Mandate revoked

=== Constituency 1 (East Prussia) ===
East Prussia was allocated 19 seats.

Name	Image	Birth	Death	Party	Notes
Ernst Duschön		1904	1981	NSDAP	
Gottfried Feder		1883	1941	NSDAP	
Rudolf Gross		1888	1955	NSDAP	
Kurt Hellwig		1890	1966	DNVP	
Erich Koch		1896	1986	NSDAP	
Friedrich Larssen		1889	1971	SPD	
Willy Leow		1887	1937	KPD	Mandate revoked
Werner Lufft		1898	1984	SPD	
Arthur Mertins		1898	1979	SPD	
Erwin Nötzelmann		1907	1981	NSDAP	
Egbert Otto		1905	1968	NSDAP	
Claus von Platen		1891	1964	NSDAP	
Eugen Plorin		1901	1943	NSDAP	
Alfred Preuss		1887	1947	NSDAP	
Hans-Adolf Prützmann		1901	1945	NSDAP	
Horst von Restorff		1880	1953	DNVP	
Walter Schütz		1897	1933	KPD	Mandate revoked
Heinrich von Sybel		1885	1969	NSDAP	
Hubert Teschner		1894	1968	Centre	

=== Constituency 2 (Berlin) ===
Berlin was allocated 18 seats.

Name	Image	Birth	Death	Party	Notes
Siegfried Aufhäuser		1884	1969	SPD	
Clara Bohm-Schuch		1879	1936	SPD	
Arthur Crispien		1875	1946	SPD	
Karl Ernst		1904	1934	NSDAP	
Hans Fabricius		1891	1945	NSDAP	
Joseph Goebbels		1897	1945	NSDAP	
Wilhelm Hein		1889	1958	KPD	Mandate revoked
Albert Kayser		1898	1944	KPD	Mandate revoked
Wilhelm Laverrenz		1879	1955	DNVP	
Carl Litke		1893	1962	SPD	
Erich Lübbe		1891	1977	SPD	
Hans Meinshausen		1889	1948	NSDAP	
Karl Olbrysch		1902	1940	KPD	Mandate revoked
Wilhelm Pieck		1876	1960	KPD	Mandate revoked
Ernst Graf zu Reventlow		1869	1943	NSDAP	
Hermann Joseph Schmitt		1896	1964	Centre	
Walter Schuhmann		1898	1956	NSDAP	
Ernst Torgler		1893	1963	KPD	Mandate revoked

=== Constituency 3 (Potsdam II) ===
Potsdam II was allocated 19 seats.

Name	Image	Birth	Death	Party	Notes
Franz Dahlem		1892	1981	KPD	Mandate revoked
Waldemar Geyer		1882	1947	NSDAP	
Karl Hanke		1903	1945	NSDAP	
Kurt Heinig		1886	1956	SPD	
Max Herm		1899	1982	KPD	Mandate revoked
Hans Hinkel		1901	1960	NSDAP	
Heinrich Hunke		1902	2000	NSDAP	
Heinrich Krone		1895	1989	Centre	
Franz Künstler		1888	1942	SPD	
Marie Kunert		1871	1957	SPD	
Annagrete Lehmann		1877	1954	DNVP	
Kurt Löwenstein		1885	1939	SPD	Resigned, 12 April 1933
Ernst Pretzel		1887	1953	NSDAP	
Fritz Schröder		1891	1937	SPD	Replaced Kurt Löwenstein, 28 April 1933
Paul Skoda		1901	1945	NSDAP	
Werner Steinhoff		1875	1949	DNVP	
Erich Timm		1884	1968	DNVP	
Walter Ulbricht		1893	1973	KPD	Mandate revoked
Werner Wächter		1902	1946	NSDAP	
Kurt Wege		1891	1947	NSDAP	

=== Constituency 4 (Potsdam I) ===
Potsdam I was allocated 21 seats.

Name	Image	Birth	Death	Party	Notes
Detlev von Arnim		1878	1947	DNVP	
Rudolf Breitscheid		1874	1944	SPD	
Herbert Dassler		1902	1957	NSDAP	
Wilhelm Decker		1899	1945	NSDAP	
Friedrich Ebert Jr.		1894	1979	SPD	
Hermann Göring		1893	1946	NSDAP	
Fritz Grosse		1904	1957	KPD	Mandate revoked
Kurt Hintze		1901	1944	NSDAP	
Marie Juchacz		1879	1956	SPD	
Else Meier		1901	1933	KPD	Mandate revoked
August Wilhelm Prinz von Preussen		1887	1949	NSDAP	
Paul Redlich		1893	1944	KPD	Mandate revoked
Hermann Remmele		1880	1939	KPD	Mandate revoked
Willi Ruckdeschel		1900	1974	NSDAP	
Erich Schmiedicke		1887	1970	NSDAP	
Siegfried Seidel-Dittmarsch		1887	1934	NSDAP	
Artur Vogt		1894	1964	KPD	Mandate revoked
Paul Walter		1891	1978	KPD	Mandate revoked
Alexander Freiherr von Wangenheim		1872	1959	NSDAP	
Albert Wiedemann		1880	1952	DNVP	
Rudolf Wissell		1869	1962	SPD	

=== Constituency 5 (Frankfurt an der Oder) ===
Frankfurt an der Oder was allocated 15 seats.

Name	Image	Birth	Death	Party	Notes
Martin Albrecht		1893	1952	NSDAP	
Erich von dem Bach-Zelewski		1899	1972	NSDAP	
Reinhard Bredow		1872	1945	NSDAP	
Ernst Heilmann		1881	1940	SPD	
Siegfried Kasche		1903	1947	NSDAP	
Friedrich-Wilhelm Krüger		1894	1945	NSDAP	
Karl Litzmann		1850	1936	NSDAP	Resigned, 2 April 1933
Anton Reißner		1890	1940	SPD	
Walter Ruppin		1885	1945	NSDAP	
Wilhelm Schmidt		1878	1945	DNVP	
Karl Schröder		1897	unknown	NSDAP	Replaced Karl Litzmann, 8 April 1933
Martin Stumpf		1886	1974	NSDAP	
Brunislaus Warnke		1883	1958	Centre	
Kurt Wege		1881	1940	DNVP	
Otto Wels		1873	1939	SPD	
Wilhelm Wigand		1895	1945	NSDAP	

=== Constituency 6 (Pomerania) ===
Pomerania was allocated 18 seats.

Name	Image	Birth	Death	Party	Notes
Gottfried Graf von Bismarck-Schönhausen		1901	1949	NSDAP	
Walther von Corswant		1886	1942	NSDAP	
Hans Friedrich		1886	1954	NSDAP	
Otto Gohdes		1896	1945	NSDAP	
Otto Hergt		1897	1945	NSDAP	
Max Heydebreck		1882	1951	NSDAP	
Edwin Hoernle		1883	1952	KPD	Mandate revoked
Wilhelm Jaeger		1887	1949	DNVP	
Wilhelm Karpenstein		1903	1968	NSDAP	
Werner Kraus		1898	1964	KPD	Mandate revoked
Karl Kuhnke		1881	unknown	DNVP	
Kurt Lüdtke		1898	1991	NSDAP	
Otto Friedrich Passehl		1874	1940	SPD	
Georg Schmidt		1875	1946	SPD	
Adolf Schmidtsdorff		1878	1945	NSDAP	
Robert Schulz		1900	1974	NSDAP	
Gustav Schumann		1879	1956	SPD	
Georg von Zitzewitz		1892	1971	DNVP	

=== Constituency 7 (Breslau) ===
Breslau was allocated 18 seats.

Name	Image	Birth	Death	Party	Notes
Maria Ansorge		1880	1955	SPD	
Helmuth Brückner		1896	1951	NSDAP	Resigned, 31 March 1933
Wilhelm Fonk		1896	1974	Centre	
Axel von Freytagh-Loringhoven		1878	1942	DNVP	
Paul Geburtig		1896	1946	NSDAP	
Hans Hayn		1896	1934	NSDAP	
Ferdinand von Hiddessen		1887	1971	NSDAP	Replaced Helmuth Brückner, 8 April 1933
Ernst Jenke		1883	1950	NSDAP	
Paul Löbe		1875	1967	SPD	
Max Maddalena		1895	1943	KPD	Mandate revoked
Georg Neugebauer		1901	1984	NSDAP	
Ludwig Perlitius		1872	1938	Centre	
Karl Peschke		1882	1943	NSDAP	
Kurt Pohle		1899	1961	SPD	
Hermann Schneider		1872	1953	NSDAP	
Josef Schönwälder		1897	1972	NSDAP	
Arthur Ullrich		1894	1969	KPD	Mandate revoked
Carl Wendemuth		1885	1964	SPD	
Udo von Woyrsch		1895	1983	NSDAP	

=== Constituency 8 (Liegnitz) ===
Liegnitz was allocated 11 seats.

Name	Image	Birth	Death	Party	Notes
Otto Buchwitz		1879	1964	SPD	
Roman Chwalek		1898	1974	KPD	Mandate revoked
Hans Frank		1900	1946	NSDAP	
Edmund Heines		1897	1934	NSDAP	
Franz-Werner Jaenke		1905	1943	NSDAP	
Konrad Jenzen		1882	1975	NSDAP	
Hans von Ludwiger		1877	1966	DNVP	
Anna Nemitz		1873	1962	SPD	
Konrad Ritsch		1906	Missing since 1944	NSDAP	
Johannes Schauff		1902	1990	Centre	
Max Wockatz		1898	1947	NSDAP	

=== Constituency 9 (Oppeln) ===
Oppeln was allocated 12 seats.

Name	Image	Birth	Death	Party	Notes
Adalbert Beck		1863	1946	Centre	
Franz Ehrhardt		1880	1956	Centre	
Max Fillusch		1896	1965	NSDAP	
Paul Hoenscher		1887	1937	NSDAP	
Anton Jadasch		1888	1964	KPD	Mandate revoked
Fritz Kleiner		1893	1974	DNVP	
Carl Friedrich von Pückler-Burghauss		1886	1945	NSDAP	
Hans Ramshorn		1892	1934	NSDAP	
Erwin Respondek		1894	1971	Centre	
Erich Rußek		1893	1945	NSDAP	
Johannes Stelling		1877	1933	SPD	Murdered, 21/22 June 1933
Carl Ulitzka		1873	1953	Centre	

=== Constituency 10 (Magdeburg) ===
Magdeburg was allocated 17 seats.

Name	Image	Birth	Death	Party	Notes
Fritz Baade		1893	1974	SPD	
Gustav von Bartenwerffer		1872	1947	DNVP	
Nikolaus Bernhard		1881	1957	SPD	
Ernst Brandt		1896	1956	KPD	Mandate revoked
Friedrich Heckert		1884	1936	KPD	Mandate revoked
Karl Höltermann		1894	1955	SPD	
Felix Jacke		1897	1954	NSDAP	
Rudolf Krause		1894	1971	NSDAP	
Wilhelm Friedrich Loeper		1883	1935	NSDAP	
Rudolf Michaelis		1902	1945	NSDAP	
Hermann Müller		1900	1970	NSDAP	
Ernst Reuter		1889	1953	SPD	
Alexander Schrader		1887	1956	NSDAP	
Konrad Schragmüller		1895	1934	NSDAP	
Reinhard Schulze-Stapen		1867	1944	DNVP	
Gerhart Seger		1896	1967	SPD	
Hans von Tschammer und Osten		1887	1943	NSDAP	

=== Constituency 11 (Merseburg) ===
Merseburg was allocated 12 seats.

Name	Image	Birth	Death	Party	Notes
Marie Ahlers		1898	1968	KPD	Mandate revoked
Paul Hertz		1888	1961	SPD	
Franz Peters		1888	1933	SPD	Died, 11 August 1933
Johannes Schäfer		1903	1993	NSDAP	
Erich Schmidt		1897	1952	DNVP	
Franz Stöhr		1879	1938	NSDAP	
Fritz Tiebel		1889	1945	NSDAP	
Thilo von Trotha		1882	1969	DNVP	
Friedrich Uebelhoer		1893	1950	NSDAP	
Otto Walter		1902	1983	KPD	Mandate revoked
Hans Wolkersdörfer		1893	1966	NSDAP	
Joachim Wünning		1898	1944	NSDAP	

=== Constituency 12 (Thuringia) ===
Thuringia was allocated 21 seats.

Name	Image	Birth	Death	Party	Notes
Albert Abicht		1893	1973	DNVP	
Herbert Albrecht		1900	1945	NSDAP	
August Creutzburg		1892	1941	KPD	Mandate revoked
Georg Dietrich		1888	1971	SPD	
Karl von Eberstein		1894	1979	NSDAP	
Wilhelm Frick		1877	1946	NSDAP	
August Frölich		1877	1966	SPD	
Walther Graef		1873	1937	DNVP	
Kurt Günther		1896	1947	NSDAP	
Heinrich Himmler		1900	1934	NSDAP	
Ernst Katzmann		1897	1968	NSDAP	
Alfred Kirchner		1887	1967	NSDAP	
Carl Oskar Klipp		1898	1981	NSDAP	
Franz Petrich		1889	1945	SPD	
Joseph Pradel		1888	1967	Centre	
Otto Schiek		1898	1980	KPD	Mandate revoked
Georg Schumann		1886	1945	KPD	Mandate revoked
Friedrich Triebel		1888	1960	NSDAP	
Oskar Trübenbach		1900	1992	NSDAP	
Mathilde Wurm		1874	1935	SPD	
Gustav Zunkel		1886	1934	NSDAP	

=== Constituency 13 (Schleswig-Holstein) ===
Schleswig-Holstein was allocated 14 seats.

Name	Image	Birth	Death	Party	Notes
Louis Biester		1882	1965	SPD	
Otto Eggerstedt		1886	1933	SPD	
Hans Gewecke		1906	1991	NSDAP	
Claus Hans		1900	1977	NSDAP	
Christian Heuck		1892	1934	KPD	Mandate revoked
Johann Friedrich Jebe		1891	1972	NSDAP	
Rudolf Lange		1879	1945	DNVP	Replaced Ernst Oberfohren, 7 April 1933
Martin Matthiessen		1901	1990	NSDAP	
Paul Moder		1896	1942	NSDAP	
Ernst Oberfohren		1881	1933	DNVP	Resigned, 31 March 1933
Max Richter		1881	1945	SPD	
Ferdinand Schramm		1889	1964	NSDAP	
Louise Schroeder		1887	1957	SPD	
Bruno Stamer		1900	1988	NSDAP	
Adolf Thormählen		1896	1942	NSDAP	

=== Constituency 14 (Weser-Ems) ===
Weser-Ems was allocated 14 seats.

Name	Image	Birth	Death	Party	Notes
Dirk Agena		1889	1934	DNVP	
Johannes Drees		1894	1944	Centre	
Alfred Faust		1883	1961	SPD	
Otto Herzog		1900	1945	NSDAP	
Ernst Hintzmann		1880	1951	DNVP	
Oskar Hünlich		1887	1963	SPD	
Wilhelm Kronsbein		1884	1972	NSDAP	
Gustav Nietfeld-Beckmann		1896	1961	NSDAP	
Karl Poppe		1896	1965	NSDAP	
Carl Röver		1889	1942	NSDAP	
Robert Stamm		1900	1937	KPD	Mandate revoked
Hermann Tempel		1889	1944	SPD	
Kurt Thiele		1896	1969	NSDAP	
August Wegmann		1888	1976	Centre	

=== Constituency 15 (East Hanover) ===
East Hanover was allocated 9 seats.

Name	Image	Birth	Death	Party	Notes
Paul Brusch		1884	unknown	NSDAP	
Adalbert Herwig		1901	1961	NSDAP	
Dietrich Klagges		1891	1971	NSDAP	
Friedrich Nowack		1890	1959	SPD	
Friedrich Peine		1871	1952	SPD	
Otto Schmidt		1888	1971	DNVP	
Otto Telschow		1876	1945	NSDAP	
Herbert Warnke		1902	1975	KPD	Mandate revoked
Georg Weidenhöfer		1882	1956	NSDAP	

=== Constituency 16 (South Hanover–Braunschweig) ===
South Hanover–Braunschweig was allocated 19 seats.

Name	Image	Birth	Death	Party	Notes
Otto Grotewohl		1894	1964	SPD	
Friedrich Jeckeln		1895	1946	NSDAP	
August Karsten		1888	1981	SPD	
Berthold Karwahne		1887	1957	NSDAP	
Albert Leister		1890	1968	NSDAP	
Vistor Lutze		1890	1943	NSDAP	
Heinrich Müller		1885	1943	NSDAP	
Wilhelm Offenstein		1889	1964	Centre	
Richard Partzsch		1881	1953	SPD	
Karl Raloff		1899	1976	SPD	
Maria Reese		1889	1958	KPD	Mandate revoked
Hartwig von Rheden		1885	1957	NSDAP	
Heinrich Richter		1887	1961	SPD	
Bernhard Rust		1883	1945	NSDAP	
Heinrich Soest		1897	1962	NSDAP	
Erich Wienbeck		1876	1949	DNVP	
Werner Willikens		1893	1961	NSDAP	
Anna Zammert		1898	1982	SPD	
Ernst Zörner		1895	Missing since 1945	NSDAP	

=== Constituency 17 (Westphalia North) ===
Westphalia North was allocated 25 seats.

Name	Image	Birth	Death	Party	Notes
Julius Adler		1894	1945	KPD	Mandate revoked
Franz Bielefeld		1880	1949	Centre	
Joseph Borchmeyer		1898	1989	DNVP	
Franz Bornefeld-Ettmann		1881	1961	Centre	
Heinrich Drake		1881	1970	SPD	Replaced Carl Schreck, 30 May 1933; resigned 23 June 1933
Julius Finke		1880	1947	SPD	
Wilhelm Florin		1894	1944	KPD	Mandate revoked
Paul Franke		1892	1961	NSDAP	
Heinrich Göckenjan		1900	1986	NSDAP	
August Heißmeyer		1897	1979	NSDAP	
Friedrich Homann		1891	1937	NSDAP	
Alfred Hugenburg		1865	1951	DNVP	
Fritz Emil Irrgang		1890	1951	NSDAP	
Alfred Janschek		1874	1955	SPD	
Anton Kampschulte		1876	1945	Centre	
Walter Nagel		1901	1943	NSDAP	
Max Opitz		1890	1982	KPD	Mandate revoked
Franz Riesener		1887	1943	Centre	
Theodor Roeingh		1886	1945	Centre	
Paul Schmidt		1901	1977	NSDAP	
Carl Schreck		1873	1956	SPD	Resigned 17 May 1933
D. Georg Schreiber		1882	1963	Centre	
Carl Severing		1875	1952	SPD	
Adam Stegerwald		1874	1945	Centre	
Mathias Thesen		1891	1944	KPD	Mandate revoked
Wilhelm Witthaus		1900	1974	NSDAP	

=== Constituency 18 (Westphalia South) ===
Westphalia South was allocated 24 seats.

Name	Image	Birth	Death	Party	Notes
Willi Agatz		1904	1957	KPD	Mandate revoked
Wilhelm Alef		1882	1957	Centre	Replaced Heinrich Josef Schmidt, 21 June 1933
Johannes Becker		1875	1955	Centre	
Alwin Brandes		1866	1949	SPD	
Fritz Emrich		1894	1947	KPD	Mandate revoked
Konrad Ende		1895	1976	DNVP	
Friedrich Helmich		1899	1974	NSDAP	
Fritz Henßler		1886	1953	SPD	
Friedrich Ernst Husemann		1873	1935	SPD	
Heinrich Imbusch		1878	1945	Centre	
Heinrich August Knickmann		1894	1941	NSDAP	
Willi Koska		1902	1943	KPD	Mandate revoked
Siegmund Kunisch		1900	1978	NSDAP	
Friedrich Wilhelm Müller		1897	1952	NSDAP	
Walter Oettinghaus		1883	1950	KPD	Mandate revoked
Ernst Riemenschneider		1900	1960	NSDAP	
Berta Schulz		1878	1950	SPD	
Albert Schmidt		1893	1945	CSVD	
Heinrich Josef Schmidt		1889	1945	Centre	Resigned, June 1933
Emil Sturtz		1892	1945	NSDAP	
Heinrich Vetter		1890	1969	NSDAP	
Josef Wagner		1899	1945	NSDAP	
August Weber		1875	1963	Centre	
Josef Weiser		1881	1964	Centre	
Elisabeth Zillken		1888	1980	Centre	

=== Constituency 19 (Hesse-Nassau) ===
Hesse-Nassau was allocated 23 seats.

Name	Image	Birth	Death	Party	Notes
Karl Barthel		1907	1974	KPD	Mandate revoked
Heinrich Becker		1877	1964	SPD	
Adolf Beckerle		1902	1976	NSDAP	
August Crone-Münzebrock		1882	1947	Centre	
Friedrich Dessauer		1881	1963	Centre	
Oskar Hergt		1869	1967	DNVP	
Fritz Lengemann		1892	1934	NSDAP	
Karl Linder		1900	1979	NSDAP	
Johannes Lommel		1875	1939	NSDAP	
Franz Metz		1878	1945	SPD	
Wilhelm Münzenberg		1889	1940	KPD	Mandate revoked
Hanns Oberlindober		1896	1949	NSDAP	
Johannes Puth		1900	1957	NSDAP	
Philipp Scheidemann		1865	1939	SPD	
Fritz Schmidt		1899	1942	NSDAP	
Michael Schnabrich		1880	1939	SPD	
Jean Albert Schwarz		1873	1957	Centre	
Walther Seidler		1897	1952	NSDAP	
Jakob Sprenger		1884	1945	NSDAP	
Curt von Ulrich		1876	1946	NSDAP	
Fritz Weitzel		1904	1940	NSDAP	
Wilhelm Wisch		1889	1951	NSDAP	
Otto Witte		1884	1963	SPD	

=== Constituency 20 (Cologne–Aachen) ===
Cologne–Aachen was allocated 19 seats.

Name	Image	Birth	Death	Party	Notes
August Asmuth		1884	1935	Centre	
Bernhard Bästlein		1894	1944	KPD	Mandate revoked
Hans Böckler		1875	1951	SPD	
Otto Dörrenberg		1888	1961	NSDAP	
Johann Ernst		1988	1969	Centre	
Thomas Eßer		1870	1948	Centre	
Otto Gerig		1885	1944	Centre	
Joseph Joos		1878	1965	Centre	
Robert Ley		1890	1945	NSDAP	
Josef Odendall		1890	1968	NSDAP	
Richard Schaller		1903	1972	NSDAP	
Rudolf Schetter		1880	1967	Centre	
Rudolf Schmeer		1905	1966	NSDAP	
Karl Friedrich Freiherr von Schorlemer		1886	1936	DNVP	
Wilhelm Sollmann		1881	1951	SPD	
Christine Teusch		1888	1968	Centre	
Nikolaus Thielen		1901	1944	KPD	Mandate revoked
Lisa Ullrich		1900	1986	KPD	Mandate revoked
Lucian Wysocki		1899	1964	NSDAP	

=== Constituency 21 (Koblenz–Trier) ===
Koblenz–Trier was allocated 11 seats.

Name	Image	Birth	Death	Party	Notes
Karl Carius		1902	1980	NSDAP	
Paul Gibbert		1898	1967	Centre	
Emil Kirschmann		1888	1949	SPD	
Matthias Neyses		1872	1946	Centre	
Else Peerenboom		1893	1958	Centre	
Ernst Ludwig Pies		1885	1942	NSDAP	
Gustav Simon		1900	1945	NSDAP	
Martin Spahn		1875	1945	DNVP	
Peter Tremmel		1874	1941	Centre	
Eduard Verhülsdonk		1884	1934	Centre	
Carl Zenner		1899	1969	NSDAP	

=== Constituency 22 (Düsseldorf East) ===
Düsseldorf East was allocated 21 seats.

Name	Image	Birth	Death	Party	Notes
Lore Agnes		1876	1953	SPD	
Wilhelm Börger		1896	1962	NSDAP	
Friedrich Karl Florian		1894	1975	NSDAP	
Paul Geisler		1895	1971	KPD	Mandate revoked
Rudolf Hennig		1895	1944	KPD	Mandate revoked
Rudolf Hilferding		1877	1941	SPD	
Lambert Horn		1899	1939	KPD	Mandate revoked
Jakob Kaiser		1888	1961	Centre	
Josef Klein		1890	1952	NSDAP	
Wilhelm Koch		1877	1950	DNVP	
Ludwig Kraft		1900	1991	NSDAP	
Carl Muhsal		1899	1962	KPD	Mandate revoked
Theodor Oppermann		1889	1945	NSDAP	
Helene Overlach		1894	1983	KPD	Mandate revoked
Peter Schlack		1875	1957	Centre	
Ernst Schnitzler		1877	1962	Centre	
Hermann Schroer		1900	1958	NSDAP	
Jakob Sporrenberg		1902	1952	NSDAP	
Magdalene von Tiling		1877	1974	DNVP	
Willi Veller		1896	1941	NSDAP	
Helene Weber		1881	1962	Centre	

=== Constituency 23 (Düsseldorf West) ===
Düsseldorf West was allocated 17 seats.

Name	Image	Birth	Death	Party	Notes
Artur Becker		1905	1938	KPD	Mandate revoked
Johannes Bell		1868	1949	Centre	
Johannes Blum		1857	1946	Centre	
Heinrich Fahrenbrach		1878	1950	Centre	
Paul Gerlach		1888	1944	SPD	
Gerd Horseling		1903	1992	KPD	Mandate revoked
Fritz Johlitz		1893	1974	NSDAP	
Max Luyken		1885	1945	NSDAP	
Heinrich Multhaupt		1899	1937	NSDAP	
Friedrich Peppmüller		1892	1972	NSDAP	
Heinrich van de Sandt		1899	1974	Centre	Replaced Karl Schmitz, 16 August 1933
Hubert Schlebusch		1893	1955	SPD	
Karl Schmitz		1881	1955	Centre	Resigned, 30 July 1933
Eduard Stadtler		1886	1945	DNVP	
Josef Terboven		1898	1945	NSDAP	
Peter Wages		1888	1938	Centre	
Hermann Zapf		1886	1957	NSDAP	
Josef Zorn		1885	1954	Centre	

=== Constituency 24 (Upper Bavaria–Swabia) ===
Upper Bavaria–Swabia was allocated 24 seats.

Name	Image	Birth	Death	Party	Notes
Max Amann		1891	1957	NSDAP	
Walther Baerwolff		1896	1969	DNVP	
Hans Beimler		1895	1936	KPD	Mandate revoked
Franz Buchner		1898	1967	NSDAP	
Hanns Bunge		1898	1966	NSDAP	
Johann Deininger		1896	1973	NSDAP	
Josef Dietrich		1892	1966	NSDAP	
Erich Emminger		1880	1951	BVP	
Josef Felder		1900	2000	SPD	
Kurt Frey		1902	1945	NSDAP	
Adolf Hitler		1889	1945	NSDAP	
Wilhelm Hoegner		1887	1980	SPD	
Michael Höllerzeder		1898	1938	KPD	Mandate revoked
Arthur Holzmann		1880	1969	NSDAP	
Michael Horlacher		1888	1957	BVP	
Fritz Kling		1879	1941	DBP	
Hans Ritter von Lex		1893	1970	BVP	
Hans Rauch		1887	1940	BVP	Replaced Hans Stimmer, 11 August 1933
Fritz Reinhardt		1895	1969	NSDAP	
Fridolin Rothermel		1895	1955	BVP	
Wilhelm Schwarz		1902	1975	NSDAP	
Rudolf Schwarzer		1879	1965	BVP	
Hans Stimmer		1892	1979	BVP	Resigned, 7 July 1933
Hans Unterleitner		1890	1971	SPD	
Anton Wiedemann		1892	1966	BVP	

=== Constituency 25 (Lower Bavaria–Upper Palatinate) ===
Lower Bavaria––Upper Palatinate was allocated 10 seats.

Name	Image	Birth	Death	Party	Notes
Michael Barthel		1899	1960	NSDAP	
Karl Bickleder		1888	1958	BVP	Replaced Joseph Sturm, 8 September 1933
Otto Erbersdobler		1895	1981	NSDAP	
Otto Graf		1894	1953	BVP	
Michael Helmerich		1885	1974	BVP	
Hans Herrmann		1889	1959	BVP	
Hans Georg Hofmann		1873	1942	NSDAP	
Artur Kolb		1895	1945	NSDAP	
Antonie Pfülf		1877	1933	SPD	Died by suicide, 8 June 1933
Ernst Putz		1896	1933	KPD	Mandate revoked
Joseph Sturm		1888	1962	BVP	Resigned, 28 August 1933

=== Constituency 26 (Franconia) ===
Franconia was allocated 25 seats.

Name	Image	Birth	Death	Party	Notes
Johann Appler		1892	1978	NSDAP	
Robert Bergmann		1886	1966	NSDAP	
Hans Dill		1887	1943	SPD	
Franz Ritter von Epp		1868	1947	NSDAP	
Albert Forster		1902	1952	NSDAP	
Georg Gradl		1884	1950	NSDAP	
Heinrich Hager		1893	1941	NSDAP	
Franz Herbert		1885	1945	BVP	
Adolf Hergenröder		1896	1945	NSDAP	
Friedrich Huth		1892	1980	BVP	
Ernst Ittameier		1893	1948	NSDAP	
Hugo Karpf		1885	1994	BVP	Replaced Johann Leicht, 22 July 1933
Hubert Korbacher		1892	1961	BVP	
Johann Leicht		1868	1940	BVP	Resigned, 4 July 1933
Friedrich Lent		1882	1960	DNVP	
Johann Meyer		1889	1950	KPD	Mandate revoked
Friedrich Puchta		1883	1945	SPD	
Hans Schemm		1891	1934	NSDAP	
Ernst Schneppenhorst		1881	1947	SPD	
Fritz Schuberth		1897	1977	NSDAP	
Fritz Soldmann		1878	1945	SPD	
Franz Stenzer		1900	1933	KPD	Mandate revoked
Julius Streicher		1885	1946	NSDAP	
Karl Troßmann		1871	1957	BVP	
Johann Vogel		1881	1945	SPD	
Philipp Wurzbacher		1898	1984	NSDAP	

=== Constituency 27 (Palatinate) ===
The Palatinate was allocated 8 seats.

Name	Image	Birth	Death	Party	Notes
Michael Bayersdörfer		1867	1940	BVP	
Fritz Benedum		1902	1965	KPD	Mandate revoked
Josef Bürckel		1895	1944	NSDAP	
Hermann Hofmann		1880	1941	Centre	
Rudolf Ramm		1887	1945	NSDAP	
Ludwig Schickert		1901	1951	NSDAP	
Nikolaus Selzner		1899	1944	NSDAP	
Friedrich Wilhelm Wagner		1894	1971	SPD	

=== Constituency 28 (Dresden–Bautzen) ===
Dresden–Bautzen was allocated 19 seats.

Name	Image	Birth	Death	Party	Notes
Arthur Arzt		1880	1953	SPD	
Paul Bang		1879	1945	DNVP	
Georg von Detten		1887	1934	NSDAP	
Eduard Dingeldey		1886	1942	DVP	
Alfred Dobbert		1897	1975	SPD	
Hermann Fleißner		1865	1939	SPD	
Hugo Gräf		1892	1958	KPD	Mandate revoked
Eugen Holdingshausen		1890	1937	NSDAP	
Manfred von Killinger		1886	1944	NSDAP	
Hellmut Körner		1904	1966	NSDAP	
Olga Körner		1897	1969	KPD	Mandate revoked
Paul Körner		1893	1957	NSDAP	
Hermann Krätzig		1871	1954	SPD	
Siegfried Rädel		1893	1943	KPD	Mandate revoked
Hans Reiter		1901	1973	NSDAP	
Johannes Schirmer		1877	1950	SPD	
Toni Sender		1888	1964	SPD	
Joseph Seydel		1887	1945	NSDAP	
Günther Ziegler		1892	1945	NSDAP	

=== Constituency 29 (Leipzig) ===
Leipzig was allocated 13 seats.

Name	Image	Birth	Death	Party	Notes
Georg Engelbert Graf		1881	1952	SPD	
Hermann Groine		1897	1941	NSDAP	
Rudolf Heß		1894	1987	NSDAP	
Paul Hocheisen		1870	1944	NSDAP	
Hans Kippenberger		1898	1937	KPD	Mandate revoked
Richard Lipinski		1867	1936	SPD	
Walther Rademacher		1879	1952	DNVP	
Hugo Saupe		1883	1957	SPD	
Wilhelm Schroeder		1898	1943	NSDAP	
Friedrich Selbmann		1899	1975	KPD	Mandate revoked
Karl Sieber		1888	1946	NSDAP	
Margarethe Starrmann		1892	1953	SPD	
Ernst Wegner		1900	1945	NSDAP	

=== Constituency 30 (Chemnitz–Zwickau) ===
Chemnitz–Zwickau was allocated 19 seats.

Name	Image	Birth	Death	Party	Notes
Robert Bauer		1898	1965	NSDAP	
Bruno Doehring		1879	1961	DNVP	
Ewald Dost		1897	1945	NSDAP	
Herbert Ender		1901	1961	NSDAP	
Georg Graupe		1875	1959	SPD	
Ernst Grube		1890	1945	KPD	Mandate revoked
Erwin Hartsch		1890	1948	SPD	
Arthur Heß		1891	1959	NSDAP	
Michael Heuschneider		1888	1936	NSDAP	
Johanna Himmler		1894	1972	KPD	Mandate revoked
Albert Janka		1907	1933	KPD	Mandate revoked
Martin Jordan		1897	1945	NSDAP	
Bernhardt Kuhnt		1876	1946	SPD	
Georg Lenk		1888	1946	NSDAP	
Martin Mutschmann		1879	1947	NSDAP	
Franz Pillmayer		1897	1939	NSDAP	
Ernst Schneller		1890	1944	KPD	Mandate revoked
Ernst Stiehler		1887	1964	NSDAP	
Kurt Uhlig		1888	1958	SPD	

=== Constituency 31 (Württemberg) ===
Württemberg was allocated 24 seats.

Name	Image	Birth	Death	Party	Notes
Eugen Bolz		1881	1945	Centre	
Albert Buchmann		1894	1975	KPD	Mandate revoked
Wilhelm Dreher		1892	1969	NSDAP	
Oskar Farny		1891	1983	Centre	Resigned, 26 June 1933
Johannes Groß		1879	1954	Centre	
Heinrich Grund		1892	1948	NSDAP	
Heinrich Haag		1879	1947	LB	
Adolf Hühnlein		1881	1942	NSDAP	
Dietrich von Jagow		1892	1945	NSDAP	
Fritz Kiehn		1885	1980	NSDAP	
Josef Malzer		1902	1954	NSDAP	
Hermann Ott		1870	1934	Centre	Replaced Oskar Farny, 20 July 1933
Erich Roßmann		1884	1953	SPD	
Friedrich Schmidt		1902	1973	NSDAP	
Kurt Schumacher		1895	1952	SPD	
Wilhelm Simpfendörfer		1888	1973	CSVD	
Eugen Stähle		1890	1948	NSDAP	
Vinzenz Stehle		1901	1967	NSDAP	
Fritz Ulrich		1888	1969	SPD	
Jakob Weimer		1887	1944	SPD	
Fritz Wider		1877	1965	DNVP	
Franz Wiedemeier		1890	1970	Centre	
Alexander Freiherr von Wrangell		1896	1987	NSDAP	
Robert Zeller		1895	1966	NSDAP	
Clara Zetkin		1857	1933	KPD	Mandate revoked

=== Constituency 32 (Baden) ===
Baden was allocated 21 seats.

Name	Image	Birth	Death	Party	Notes
Walter Chemnitz		1901	1947	KPD	Mandate revoked
Carl Diez		1877	1969	Centre	
Franz Doll		1906	unknown	KPD	Mandate revoked
Joseph Ersing		1882	1956	Centre	
Ernst Föhr		1892	1976	Centre	
Albert Hackelsberger		1893	1940	Centre	
Alfred Hanemann		1872	1957	DNVP	
Ludwig Huber		1889	1946	NSDAP	Resigned, 30 June 1933
Wilhelm Hug		1880	1966	NSDAP	
Hanns Ludin		1905	1947	NSDAP	
Stefan Meier		1889	1944	SPD	
Friedrich Plattner		1901	1960	NSDAP	
Ernst Roth		1901	1951	SPD	
Robert Roth		1891	1975	NSDAP	
Johannes Rupp		1903	1978	NSDAP	
Josef Schmitt		1874	1939	Centre	
Clara Siebert		1873	1963	Centre	
Adalbert Ullmer		1896	1966	NSDAP	Replaced Wilhelm Hug, 21 July 1933
Robert Heinrich Wagner		1895	1946	NSDAP	
Otto Wetzel		1905	1982	NSDAP	
Curt Wittje		1905	1982	NSDAP	
Willy Ziegler		1899	1942	NSDAP	

=== Constituency 33 (Hesse-Darmstadt) ===
Hesse-Darmstadt was allocated 13 seats.

Name	Image	Birth	Death	Party	Notes
Fritz Bockius		1882	1945	Centre	
Otto Brenzel		1898	1945	KPD	Mandate revoked
Fritz Kern		1903	1945	NSDAP	
Wilhelm Knoll		1873	1947	Centre	
Karl Lenz		1899	1944	NSDAP	
Carlo Mierendorff		1897	1943	SPD	
Ludwig Münchmeyer		1885	1947	NSDAP	
Friedrich Ringshausen		1880	1941	NSDAP	
Heinrich Georg Ritzel		1893	1971	SPD	
Alfred Rosenberg		1893	1946	NSDAP	
August Schneidhuber		1887	1934	NSDAP	
Richard Wagner		1902	1973	NSDAP	
Wilhelm Weber		1876	1959	SPD	

=== Constituency 34 (Hamburg) ===
Hamburg was allocated 11 seats.

Name	Image	Birth	Death	Party	Notes
Elise Augustat		1889	1940	KPD	Mandate revoked
Adolf Biedermann		1881	1933	SPD	Died, 11 May 1933
Arthur Böckenhauer		1899	1953	NSDAP	
Wilhelm Boltz		1886	1939	NSDAP	
Gustav Dahrendorf		1901	1954	SPD	
Carl Gottfried Gok		1869	1945	DNVP	
Karl Kaufmann		1900	1969	NSDAP	
Hans Nieland		1900	1976	NSDAP	
Helmut Reinke		1897	1969	NSDAP	
Hans Staudinger		1889	1980	SPD	
Heinrich Steinfeldt		1892	1955	SPD	Replaced Adolf Biedermann, 12 June 1933
Ernst Thälmann		1886	1944	KPD	Mandate revoked

=== Constituency 35 (Mecklenburg) ===
Mecklenburg was allocated 8 seats.

Name	Image	Birth	Death	Party	Notes
Hermann Behme		1900	1969	NSDAP	
Friedrich Everling		1891	1958	DNVP	
Herbert Fust		1899	1974	NSDAP	
Friedrich Hildebrandt		1898	1948	NSDAP	
Julius Leber		1891	1945	SPD	
Carl Moltmann		1884	1960	SPD	
Walther Schröder		1902	1973	NSDAP	
Hermann Schuldt		1896	1980	KPD	Mandate revoked
