= Heinig =

Heinig is a German surname. Notable people with the surname include:

- Katrin Dörre-Heinig (born 1961), former athlete from Germany, who competed mainly in the marathon
- Kurt Heinig (1886–1956), German lithograph, politician and journalist
- Marcel Heinig (born 1981), German extreme sportsman who has his greatest success in decatriathlons
- Stefan Heinig (born 1962), CEO of the major German company KiK Textilien und Non-Food GmbH from Bönen (Germany)
