= Paul Hoenscher =

German politician

- Born: 25 March 1887
- Died: 16 February 1937 (aged 50)

Paul Hoenscher (25 March 1887 in Klein Neudorf, Grottkau district – 16 February 1937) was a German politician of the National Socialist German Worker's Party (NSDAP). He was seated in the Reichstag from March 1933 to his death in February 1937.

== Biography ==
Hoenscher was the son of an independent farmer. He attended a Volksschule between 1884 and 1887 and a Gymnasium between 1887 and 1900. Then he had a vocational training in several agricultural businesses until 1908. He also attended complementary course at an agricultural winter school. After serving in the 22nd Infantry Regiment between 1908 and 1910, he became an independent farmer.

As a member of the 51st Reserve Infantry Regiment, Hoenscher fought in World War I from 1914 to 1918 and was awarded the 2nd-class Iron Cross and the Silesian Eagle.

In the 1920s, he joined the NSDAP. He assumed several functions within the party; he was a District Peasant Leader (Kreisbauernführer) among others. In the March 1933 parliamentary election, he was elected to the Reichstag from electoral constituency 9 (Oppeln) for the NSDAP. He was re-elected in November 1933 and in March 1936 and retained his seat until his death in February 1937.

== Bibliography ==
- Stockhorst, Erich (2000). 5000 Köpfe. Wer war was im 3. Reich (in German) (reproduction of the original 1967 ed.). Kiel: Arndt. ISBN 3-88741-116-1.
