= Else Meier =

German politician (1901–1933)

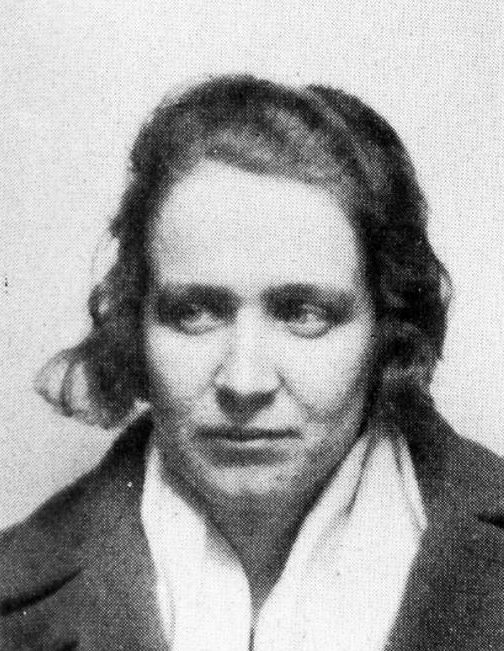
Meier c. 1932

Else Meier (born Else Wagner; 24 February 1901 – 2 August 1933) was a German politician (KPD) who died shortly after the Nazis came to power in 1933.

== Life ==
Else Wagner was born in Magdeburg. After leaving school she became a metal worker. She married the paint shop worker Otto Meier and became politically active in the Communist Party which she joined after the First World War. By 1932 she had relocated and was living in Wedding, a quarter of Berlin in the city's north-central area. In April 1932 she was elected a member of the Prussian regional parliament (Landtag).

In the general election of 5 March 1933 Else Meier stood for election not to a regional parliament but to the national parliament (Reichstag). She was elected as a communist member representing the Potsdam electoral district. However, the election took place two months after the Nazi power seizure, since when the government had been systematically transforming the country into a one-party dictatorship. Following the Reichstag fire at the end of February 1933 - officially blamed, with implausible haste, on "communists" - the authorities had placed dealing with the Communist Party high on their agenda. On 30 March 1933, a week after the president had signed the Enabling Act of 1933, all 81 communist members of the Reichstag, including Else Meier, were by law deprived of their places in the parliament.

Else Meier died in Berlin on 2 August 1933. Unclarity surrounds the circumstances of her death. Research indicates that she may have died as the result of a violent assault by Nazi paramilitaries. However, that she died as the result of an incurable disease is also a possibility.
