= Helene Glatzer =

German Communist politician and anti-government resistance activist

Helene Glatzer (8 February 1902 – 31 January 1935) was a young Communist politician who after 1933 became a German anti-government resistance activist. She died - some sources state simply that she was murdered - following several days of questioning and torture at the police facility in the Hallmarkt district of central Halle.

== Life ==
Helene "Lene" Glatzer was born into a working-class family in Weinböhla, a small town that had grown prosperous thanks to its limestone extraction operations. Weinböhla is located on the edge of Meissen, a short distance to the north-west of Dresden. Her parents became members of the Social Democratic Party (SPD) in 1905, some years before, in the eyes of the political establishment of that time, the young party became mainstream. After her father's early death her mother was left to bring up two daughters as a single parent. Money was short. Helene was still young when they moved to Berlin where in 1908 she enrolled at a "Volksschule" (state backed compulsory secondary school). By the time she successfully completed her school career, in 1916, the family had moved back to Weinböhla.

She moved on to study at a business oriented secondary sachool ("Handelsschule") in nearby Coswig, and then took office work with a succession of businesses in Dresden. By this time she had become the principal bread-winner for herself, her mother and her younger sister. Glatzer was still only 14 in 1916 shen she joined the young socialists ("Freie sozialistische Jugend" / FSJ). Serious internal divisions within the SPD had emerged at the start of the war when the party leadership agreed to back war funding with their votes in the Reichstag (national parliament). Division was intensified by the slaughter of war abroad and economic austerity on the home front, which led to the launch, formally in 1917, of a breakaway anti-war Independent Social Democratic Party (" Unabhängige Sozialdemokratische Partei Deutschlands" / USPD). Glatzer joined the Weinböhla branch of the USPD in 1919, also joining the local branch of the FSJ. Over the next couple of tumultuous years the FSJ became part of the newly formed Young Communist League (KJVD) of which she now also became a member. Around 1921, now aged 19, she became seriously politically active through her work with the KJVD in her part of East Saxony. There was a particular focus, in which she played a leading part, on recruitment of new members and the creation of new "communist children's groups" locally. She became a representative of her locality with the KJVD regional leadership team ("Bezirksleitung") for East Saxony.

In 1922 Glatzer took part in the creation of a "communist children's group". After that, by now aged twenty, she joined the party. Over the next few years she teamed up with Olga Körner to organise the creation and provide leadership for an East Saxony branch of the RFMB, a female counterpart of the newly launched network, Red Front Alliance ("Roter Frontkämpferbund") of pro-communist paramilitaries. According to one source the East Saxony RFMB was "the first proletarian women's organisation in Germany". Glatzer was also employed in the "Women's section" of the party's regional leadership team. In 1923 it was primarily due to Helene Glatzer that the first Conference of the Communist Children's Group in East Saxony took place. She engaged with several other organisation including workers' sports associations and Red Aid ("Rote Hilfe"), a workers' welfare organisation with close links to the party.

In 1929 Helene Glatzer took part as a delegate at the party's national conference, held that year in Berlin-Wedding and in the national congress of the RFMB. On 12 May 1929 she was elected to membership of the Saxon state parliament ("Landtag"), but she remained a member only till the next state election, held on 22 June 1930. Issues on which she focused her attention included equal rights for proletarian women, improved training and conditions for apprentices along with various social concerns highlighted by midwives.

It nevertheless became clear that the party had other plans for Glatzer. In 1930 she was sent to Moscow where she undertook a three-year period of study at the International Lenin School. The institution was operated at this time by the Comintern and it was also with the Comintern that she worked while in Moscow. Around this time she married Max Tschalewitschow, a physician.

Sources differ as to whether it was in 1934 or early in 1935 that Helene Glatzer returned to Germany. (There is no mention in the sources of her having been accompanied by her new husband.) The Hitler government had taken power at the start of 1933 and almost immediately taken steps to transform Germany into a one-party dictatorship. Glatzer's political activity on her return as a member of the "underground" Communist Party leadership team ("Bezirksleitung") in Halle-Merseburg was therefore by definition illegal: one cover name under which she operated was "Erna Schneider".

It appears likely that the Communist group to which Helene Glatzer belonged had been infiltrated by an informant working for the security services. On 26 January 1935 she took part in an illegal meeting at a "safe house" along Thüringerstraße 26 in Halle. The authorities became aware of the meeting and the participants were surprised by the arrival of Gestapo officials. Glatzer was arrested along with the others present: Wilhelm Künzler, Albert Kayser and the owner of the apartment, Hans Lehnert. Grounds for the arrests were "treasonable communication" ("hochverräterische Beratung"). The detainees were initially taken to the police station in the Merseburgerstraße where their personal details were logged. Then they were then taken to the police facility in the city's Hallmarkt district for investigatory detention, which involved several days of questioning and torture. Helene Glatzer succumbed to the mistreatment and died - effectively murdered - on 31 January 1935. Her physical remains were buried in Halle on 6 February 1935.
