= Albert Kayser =

German political activist and resistance fighter

- Born: 28 November 1898; Stettin, Prussia, Germany
- Died: 18 October 1944 (aged 45); Buchenwald concentration camp, Thuringia, Germany
- Occupations: trades union official politician resistance activist
- Political party: USPD; KPD
- Spouse: Minna
- Children: Ursula

Albert Kayser (28 November 1898 – 18 October 1944) was a German trades union official, political activist and politician (KPD). In July 1932 he was elected a member of the national parliament (Reichststag). By the time democracy was suspended, in March 1933, he had already been arrested and detained by government authorities. He was released at the end of 1933 and spent much of 1934 and early 1935 living "underground" (unregistered with any city hall) engaged in political resistance. Most of the twelve Nazi years he spent in a succession of jails and concentration camps where opportunities for resistance were more limited. He died at Buchenwald in October 1944, probably from a form of Typhus ("Flecktyphus"). An illegal funeral service was held for him in the camp on 22 October 1944.

== Political biography ==
Albert Kayser was born in Stettin (as Szczecin was known at that time), a major sea port close to the Baltic coast ("Ostsee" in German language sources) and, before 1945, part of Germany. Slightly unusually, the family into which he was born was registered as "religionslos" – neither Protestant, Catholic nor Jewish. He grew up in Berlin. Little is known of his childhood, but by 1919 he was working for Siemens at the city gas works in Berlin. That year he became a work-place trades union representative. He was involved with the anti-war Independent Social Democratic Party ("Unabhängige Sozialdemokratische Partei Deutschlands" / USPD), and in 1921, as the USPD broke up, he was one of many former members who joined the recently launched Communist Party of Germany. However, he lost his job with Siemens in 1923 because of his involvement in that year's "August strike". He then took a job with the BVG (Berlin bus and tram operator). Here, towards the end of the 1920s, he was elected to a senior role on the works council. In November 1932, as a member of the strike leadership, he was one of those in large part responsible for organising nationwide support for Berlin's 28,000 striking transport workers. At a time of growing political polarisation the strike powerfully demonstrated the power of organised labour, and it raised Kayser's own public profile.

Albert Kayser was elected a member of the national parliament (Reichststag) in July 1932. He represented a Berlin electoral district (Wahlkreis), sitting as one of 89 Communist Party members in a 608 seat parliament. The strong electoral performance of the mutually antagonistic National Socialist and Communist parties, refusing to work either with each other or with the more moderate political parties, meant that the Reichstag was deadlocked. A second 1932 general election, held in November, resulted in the Communists winning a further 11 seats: Albert Kayser was among those re-elected. The National Socialists actually lost 34 seats between July and November 1932, but they remained by far the largest single party in the Reichstag. Kayser was re-elected again early in March 1933, but by this time the constitution had been suspended, and a couple of weeks later the Enabling Act of 23 March 1933 completed the creation of a "legally" mandated post-democratic German dictatorship. The trigger, ostensibly, had been the Reichstag fire on the night of 27/28 February, which was instantly blamed by the recently formed Hitler government on "communists". Albert Kayser was one of several thousand Communist Party members – among them all the Communist Reichstag members and trades union leaders the authorities were able to locate – to be arrested on 28 February 1933.

He was taken to the Sonnenburg concentration camp, in the marshy countryside between Berlin and Posen, where he was held in "protective custody" till 23 December 1933. After his release he undertook illegal party work, also appearing as a party instructor in the Erfurt, Hanover and Magdeburg regions, filling a void created by the arrest on 20 January 1934 of Martin Schwantes. Then underground party leadership in Berlin nominated him as chief party instructor for Central Germany (Mitteldeutschland) which gave him direct responsibility for training guidance in the party's Thuringia, Halle-Merseburg and Magdeburg-Anhalt regions. As one of nine senior party officers in the country Kayser lived illegally at Wörmlitzerstraße 3 in Halle, using the cover name "Robert Erdmann". Elsewhere it is stated that he was living with his wife and daughter at Groningerstraße 22 in Berlin-Wedding. Either way, as one of the most important Communist leaders at large in central Germany, he was almost certainly constantly on the move.

On 26 January 1935 Albert Kayser took part in an illegal meeting at a "safe house" along Thüringerstraße 26 in Halle. Thanks to a denunciation, the authorities became aware of the meeting and the participants were surprised by the arrival of Gestapo officials. Kayser was arrested along with the others present: Wilhelm Künzler, Helene Glatzer and the owner of the apartment, Hans Lehnert. Grounds for the arrests were "treasonable communication" ("hochverräterische Beratung"). They were initially taken to the police station in the Merseburgerstraße where their personal details were logged. They were then taken to the police facility at the Hallmarkt for investigatory detention, which involved several days of questioning and torture. Helene Glatzer succumbed to the mistreatment and died – effectively murdered – on 31 January 1935. Albert Kayser survived.

Early in August 1935 Kayser faced the special People's Court. The charge of "preparing to commit high treason" ("Vorbereitung zum Hochverrat") was the usual one under circumstances of this kind: he was sentenced to death. Following sentencing, as he was led away, it was reported that he called out to his co-defendants Minna Herm, Wilhelm Künzler, Franz Urbanski and Josef Pfaff, addressing them as "Red front comrades" ("Rot Front, Genossen!"). This was widely reported and discussed in the government press under headlines such as "No space for central German rabble-rousers" ("Kein Platz für mitteldeutsche Hetzer") and "Culling hatespeak in central Germany" ("Ausmerzung mitteldeutscher Hetzer"). Publicity given to the case and to the death sentence conferred on Kayser spread internationally. A number of exiled top SPD leaders met together with exiled communist leaders at the Hôtel Lutetia in Paris and resolved to bury political differences between Germany's moderate and extreme political left, part of a development that would resonate through German politics for decades. Back in Berlin the government was hard at work to ensure the success of the forthcoming Berlin Olympic Games. It was a bad time for disagreeable international press headlines about the "judicial" execution of government opponents. In the end Kayser's sentence was reduced to lifetime imprisonment. Other former city transport workers, such as Rudolf Claus, were not so lucky, possibly because their sentencing had received less national and international press attention. Claus, whose People's Court trial took place at the same time was Kayser's, was executed on 17 December 1935.

He was taken initially to Berlin's Plötzensee Prison. Between February 1936 and 1943 Albert Kayser was imprisoned at the Brandenburg-Görden Prison. International publicity given to his case in 1935 meant that, unlike most prison inmates in Hitler's Germany, Kayser was never completely forgotten in the wider world. Even inside the prison at Brandenburg–Görden, he was involved in organising antifascist resistance and solidarity.

On 21 December 1943 Kayser was transferred to the Buchenwald concentration camp. Here he fell ill and on 18 October 1944 died, probably from a form of Typhus ("Flecktyphus"). Three days later, on 22 October 1944, fellow inmates held an illegal funeral service for him.
