= Wilhelm Decker =

German politician

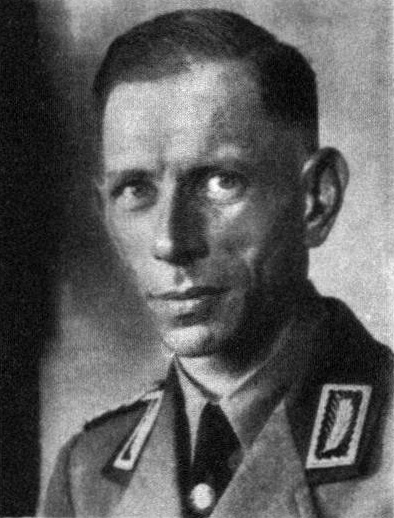
Wilhelm Decker.

Wilhelm "Will" Decker (13 December 1899 in Rostock – 1 May 1945 near Berlin) was a German publicist, and in the time of the Third Reich the General Labour Leader.

After his Abitur, he served at the front in 1917–1918 in the First World War and afterwards studied history and German studies between 1919 and 1922 at the University of Rostock from which he earned a doctorate. By 1919, he was working as a journalist and, between 1923 and 1925, he was also the editor of newspapers in Pyritz (today Pyrzyce) and Rostock. As of 1926, he was a freelance writer.

Quite early on, Decker joined the Nazi Party and as of 1929 functioned as a Gau speaker. At the 1930 parliamentary election, he was elected as a Reichstag deputy from electoral constituency 4 (Potsdam I). He would continue to hold this seat until his death.

From 1931, at the Voluntary Labour Service, Nazi leaders appointed him as "Inspector for Education and Training" in the Reich leadership.

As of 1934, Decker published the Nazi magazine "Volk an der Arbeit", whose content was so well liked by the Nazi leadership that it earned him an appointment as General Labour Leader in the Reichsarbeitsdienst (Reich Labour Service).

Alongside this, Decker had a teaching job at the University of Berlin, and was appointed an honorary professor in June 1937.

Decker kept publishing many writings having to do with the Labour Service, among them:

- 1933: "Der deutsche Weg" ("The German Way")
- 1935: "Die politische Aufgabe des Arbeitsdienstes" ("The Labour Service's Political Function")
- 1939: "Mit dem Spaten durch Polen" ("With the Spade through Poland")

Will Decker died on 1 May 1945 – the day after Adolf Hitler's death – as he tried to get himself out of Berlin, which by now lay under the Red Army's siege. Whether he killed himself or was wounded is to this day unknown.

In 1961, The West Berlin denazification court confiscated property worth $400 from Decker, which were used towards compensation of Nazi victims.
