= Marcel Heinig =

German triathlete and distance runner

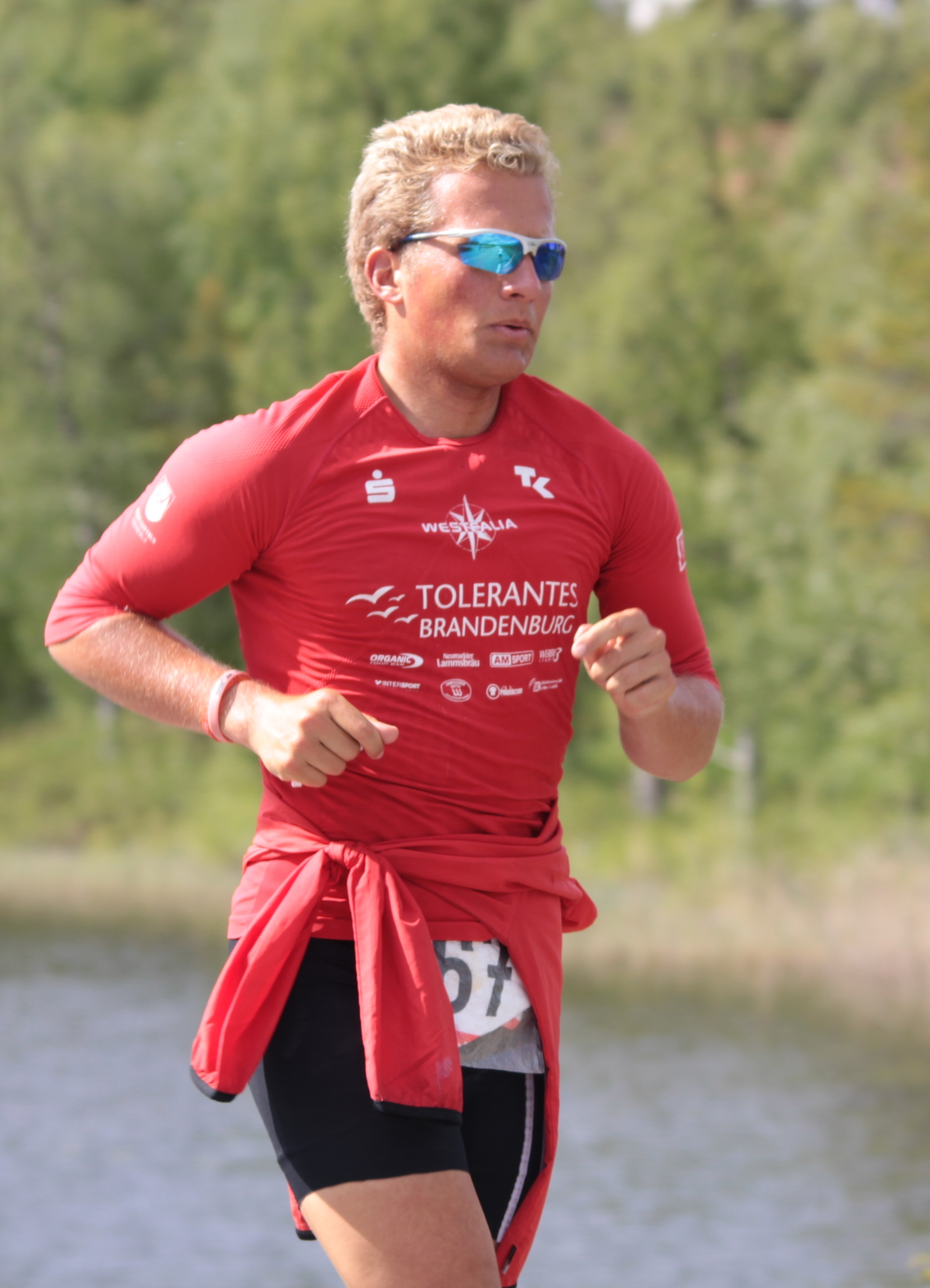
Heinig in 2009

Marcel Nico Andreas Heinig (born 16 November 1981 in Cottbus) is a German extreme sportsman who has had his greatest success in decatriathlons, which are more than fifty times the distance of the Olympic Distance Triathlon. He scored his biggest victory by winning the gold medal at the World Championships in Decatriathlon (10x Ironman Hawaii) in 2008.

Heinig attended Leonardo da Vinci School in Cottbus. In his youth, Heinig skipped physical education and did everything possible to dodge sports activities. He was 40 kg overweight and very unsportsmanlike. However, when he joined the army in 2001, he could no longer avoid intense physical activity. He faced problems due to being overweight during the Physical Fitness Test, drills and orientation process. However, seven years later, the once unathletic Marcel became the youngest World Champion in the history of the Decatriathlon.

== Achievements and titles ==
- Worldwide youngest member of the "100 Marathon Club" (Germany), 2005
- Age group- and Group world record in the 10-day-triathlon, 2006
- World Cup Champion International Ultra Triathlon Association, 2008
- World Champion Decatriathlon, 2008
- Worldrecord overall in the 10-Days-Triathlon, 2009
