= Alexander Freiherr von Wangenheim =

German Nazi politician and SA officer (1872–1959)

Alexander Freiherr von Wangenheim (31 October 1872 – 1 March 1959) was a German Nazi Party politician.

After attending elementary school and the Ernestine Gymnasium, Gotha, he completed an agricultural apprenticeship. Wangenheim later studied history in Marburg and Berlin. In January 1897, he became a career officer. He later worked in agriculture again and was chief editor of various newspapers. In February 1913, Wangenheim joined the press department in the Prussian War Ministry. After the end of the First World War, Wangenheim helped found the Brandenburgischen Bauernhochschule (Brandenburg Farmers' College) in Neuruppin, where he worked until the autumn of 1927. In 1928, von Wangenheim became director of the Märkische Farmers' College (Bauernhochschule Vereins Brandenburgischer Bauern und Bauernhochschüler). He married in 1939.

Wangenheim was editor of the Völkischer Beobachter from 1921. He joined the Nazi Party (NSDAP) for the first time in 1922, then again in 1928 after the ban was lifted (membership number 77,217). In that year he was promoted to Sturmabteilung (SA) leader in Brandenburg and the Ostmark, and also was appointed Gau and Reich speaker of the NSDAP.

In the parliamentary election of September 1930, Wangenheim was elected to the Reichstag as a candidate of the NSDAP for electoral constituency 4 (Potsdam I). At the election of March 1936, Wangenheim exchanged his mandate in Potsdam for constituency 2 (Berlin-West) which he subsequently represented without interruption until the end of the Nazi regime in May 1945. The most important parliamentary event in which Wangenheim participated during his time as a member of parliament was the passing of the Enabling Act in March 1933.

From 1933, Wangenheim was head of the Kurmark "Alexander Freiherr von Wangenheim"-Gransee Farmers' School. From 1934 to 1945, Wangenheim was head of the Reich Farmers' College in Goslar . He was also a member of the Reich Farmers' Council and the Kurmark State Farmers' Council, the Association of Brandenburg Farmers and Farmers' College Students, and the Association of Free German Farmers.

The rank held by Wangenheim in the SA at the end of the war was that of SA-Standartenführer.
