= Anna Zammert =

German politician (1898–1982)

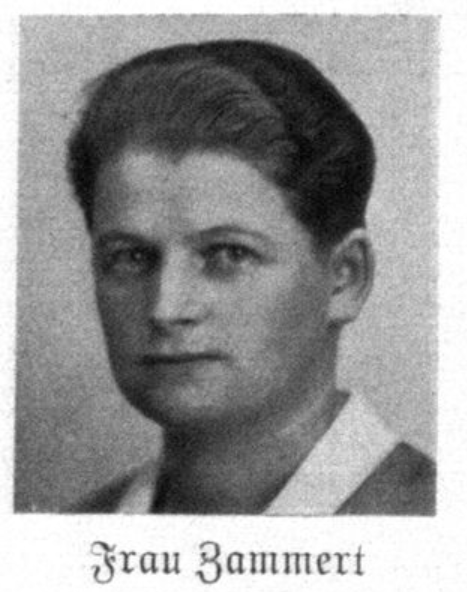
- Born: Anna Rabe; July 12, 1898; Delitzsch
- Died: December 13, 1982; Delitzsch
- Movement: Union
- Spouse: Paul Zammert

Anna Zammert (given name Anna Rabe, July 12, 1898 - December 13, 1982) was a German politician in the SPD party and union member.

== Life ==
As a child, Anna Zammert worked for her father's business, an independent cigar manufacturer. After finishing primary school she wanted to become a maid, however following the beginning of the first World War, she had to start work in a leather factory. Later she also worked in a coal mine and in road construction.

In 1917 she first encountered the USPD. Starting in 1918 she worked in a chemical factory in Bitterfeld, and became a member of the Factory Worker's Association (Fabrikenarbeiterverbandes/FAV). In 1922 she joined the SPD. She performed numerous voluntary positions in child welfare and with the Workers Welfare Association (Arbeiterwohlfahrt/AWO). From 1925 to 1926 she studied at the Academy of Work (Akademie der Arbeit), founded in 1921 in Frankfurt. It was there that she married the book printer Paul Zammert. In 1927 she was commissioned by the board of the FAV to assist with the development of a new Worker's Secretariat in Hanover, which the FAV was central to, and became a member of the board of directors in 1928. Between 1927 and 1933 she was the first female secretary to work at such a level in an individual union in Germany. She visited many companies across several regions and informed workers about occupational safety regulations for pregnant women. She also gave lectures in the Hanover Community College (Volkshochschule/VHS) about Women in Social Legislation. From September 1930 until June 1933 she was an SPD representative in the German Parliament (Reichstag) for the Southern Hanover-Braunschweig district.

After the rise to power of National Socialism in 1933, in April she was imprisoned for 6 months because of her political activism. As she continued being followed by the Gestapo, in 1935 she fled together with her husband to Denmark. From there she immigrated to Norway in 1936. When it was occupied by Germany in 1940, she was imprisoned again. Upon her release, she fled once more to Sweden. From 1943 to 1945 she was a board member of the national group of German trade unionists in Sweden.

After the end of the second World War, in 1946 she returned to Hanover and engaged herself in a renewed founding of the AWO. However, she was unable to receive a demanding job in the union. In the summer of 1953 she returned to Sweden, where she worked in the FAV in Stockholm, and where she lived until the death of her husband in 1975. She returned to her daughter in Delitzsch, DDR, where she died in 1982.

== Memorials ==
In Bergneustadt there is a kindergarten which the AWO named after Anna Zammert. In Springe, the education and conference center built in 1990 bears her name. In Delizsch (since 2007) and Göttingen (since 2012) there are streets named after her. The southern district of the city of Hanover was named after her in 2013.
