= Kurt Heinig =

German lithograph, politician and journalist (1886–1956)

Kurt Heinig (born 19 January 1886 in Leipzig; died 21 May 1956 in Stockholm) was a German lithographer, politician and journalist.

After travelling through the USA he wrote about his experiences in Vorwärts and the Wettelbüne Mitte during the 1920s. Heinig meant that Germany should modernize itself through technological progress and development of a larger domestic market. He did however, point out that Germany could not fully adopt the American model, because of the very different backgrounds of the two nations.

From 1927 to 1933, Kurt Heinig was a financial expert in the SPD-parliamentary group. As a member of the budget committee he took part in revealing the Eastern Aid scandal. In 1933 he emigrated to Denmark after having refused to sign Hitler's enabling act. And in 1940, as Germany invaded Denmark, he left for Sweden. During and after the second world war, Heinig was a member of SoPaDe as well as co-worker with several Swedish and West German newspapers. In 1945 Heinig created the "German association of 1945" in Stockholm, an organization striving for a better German-Swedish relationship. In 1955 he became Doctor Honoris Causa at the Stockholm University.

Kurt Heinig died on 21 May 1956 in Stockholm.
