= March 1933 German federal election =

- 5 March 1933

All 647 seats in the Reichstag 324 seats needed for a majority
- Registered: 44,685,764 (▲0.7%)
- Turnout: 88.7% (▲8.1pp)
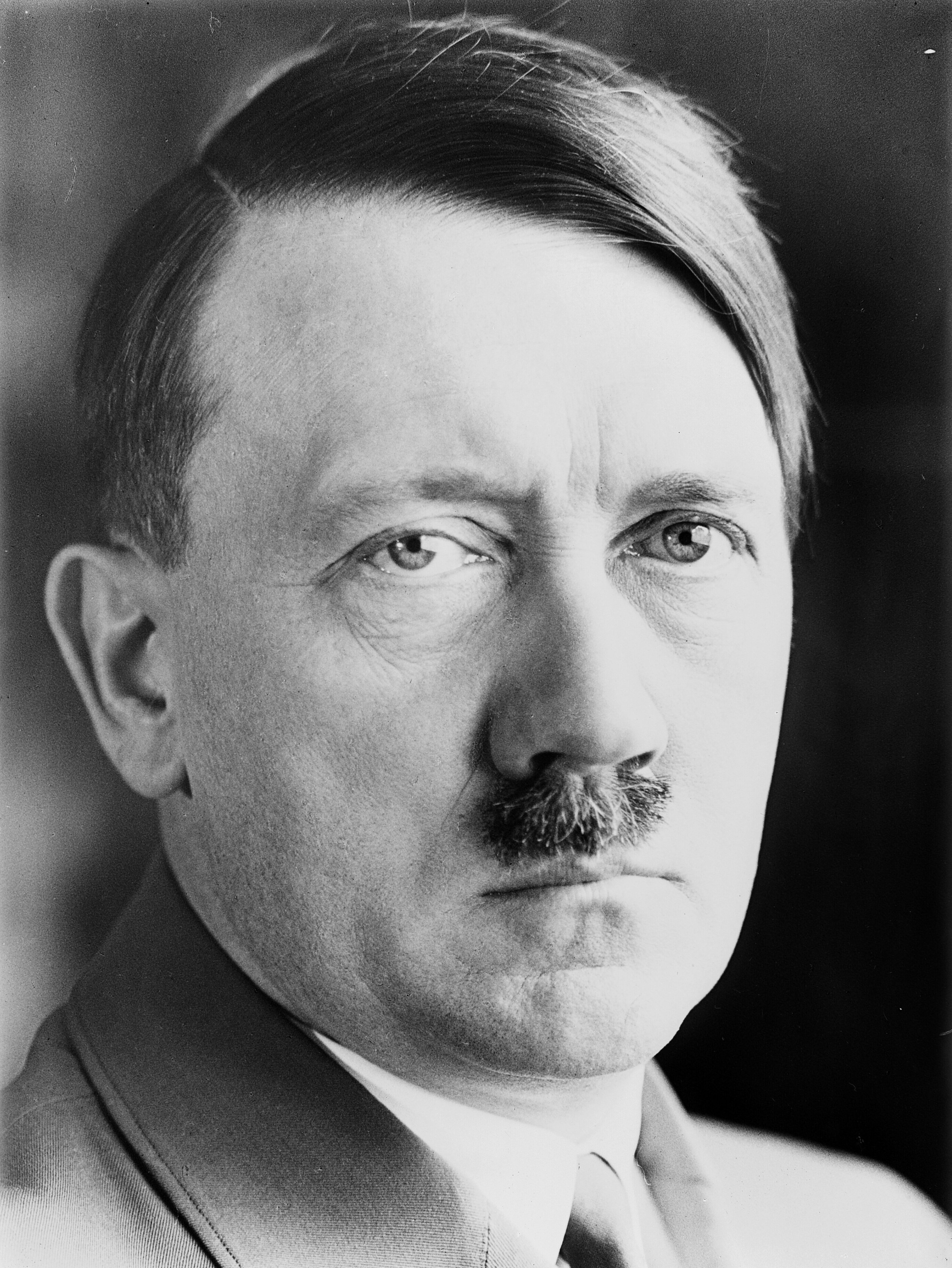

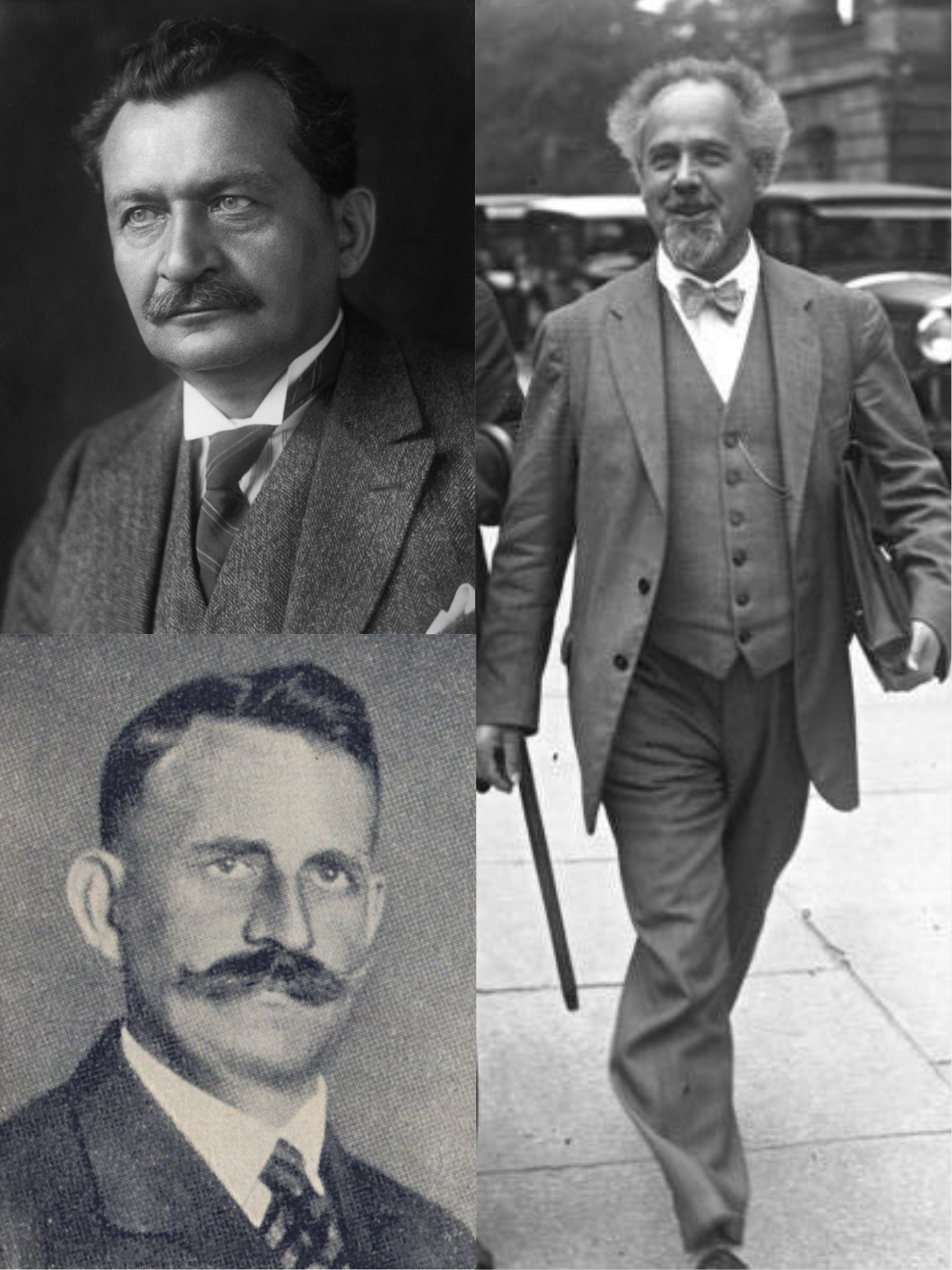

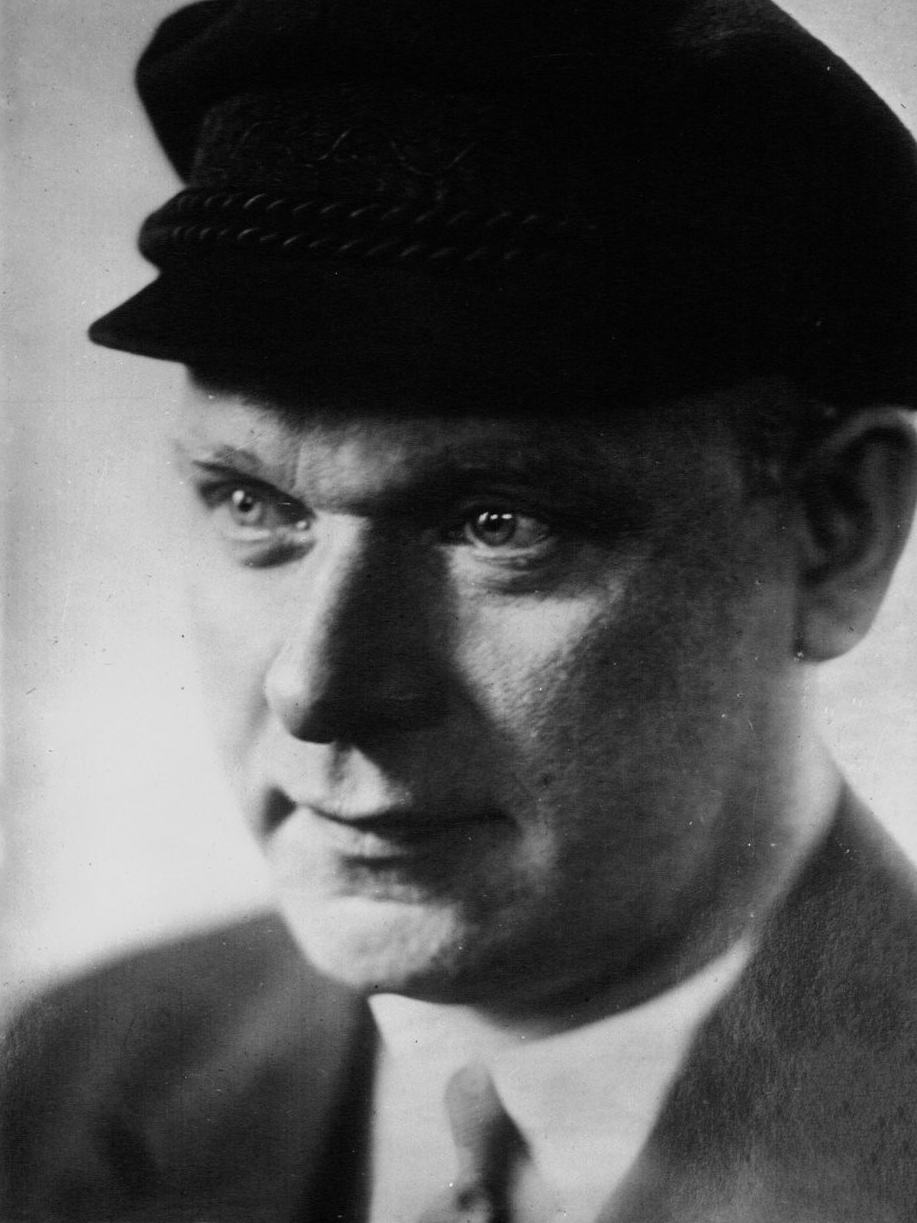

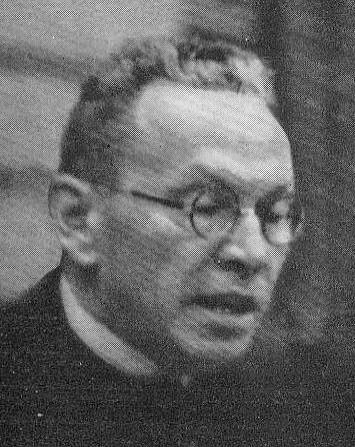

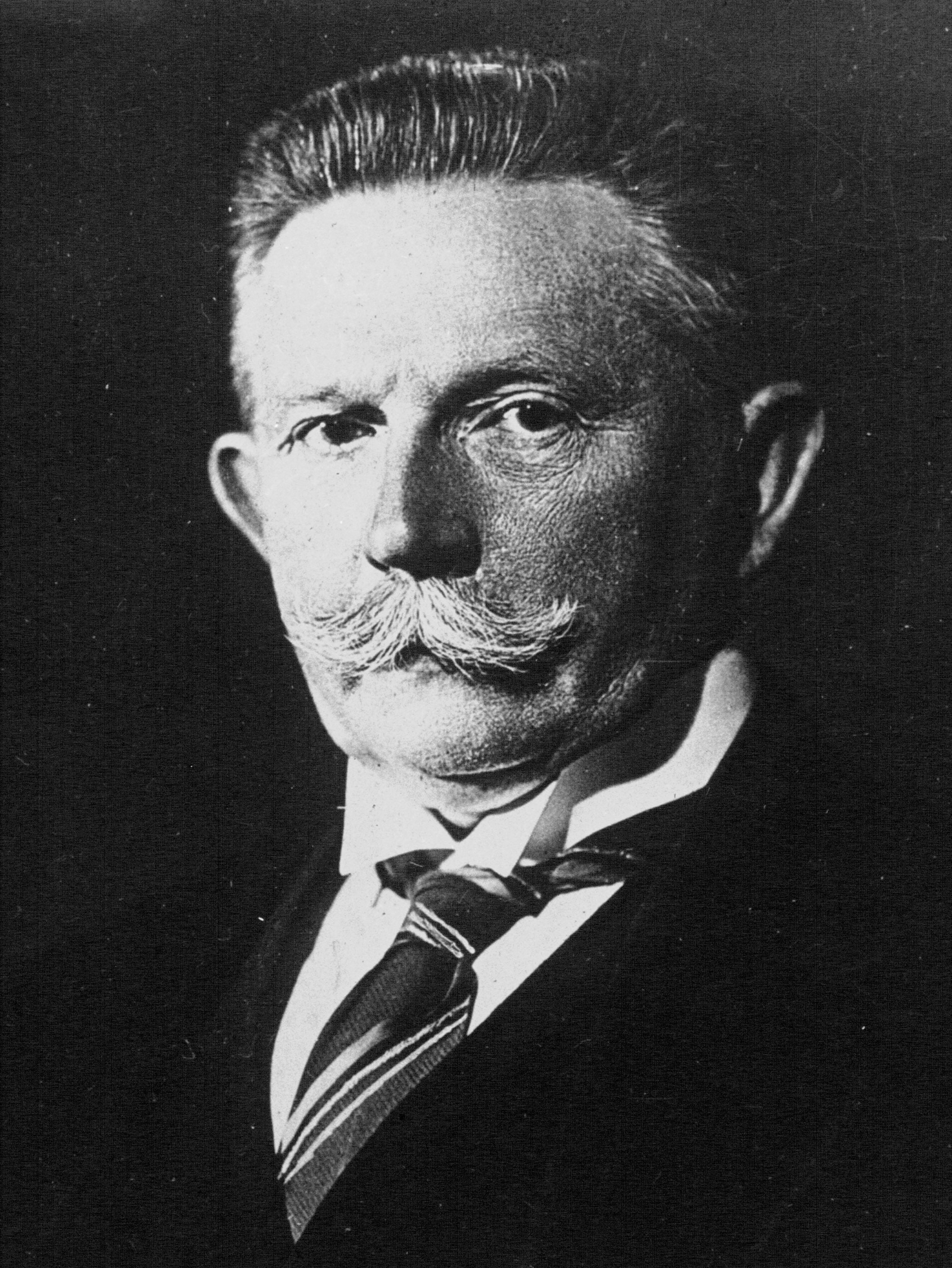

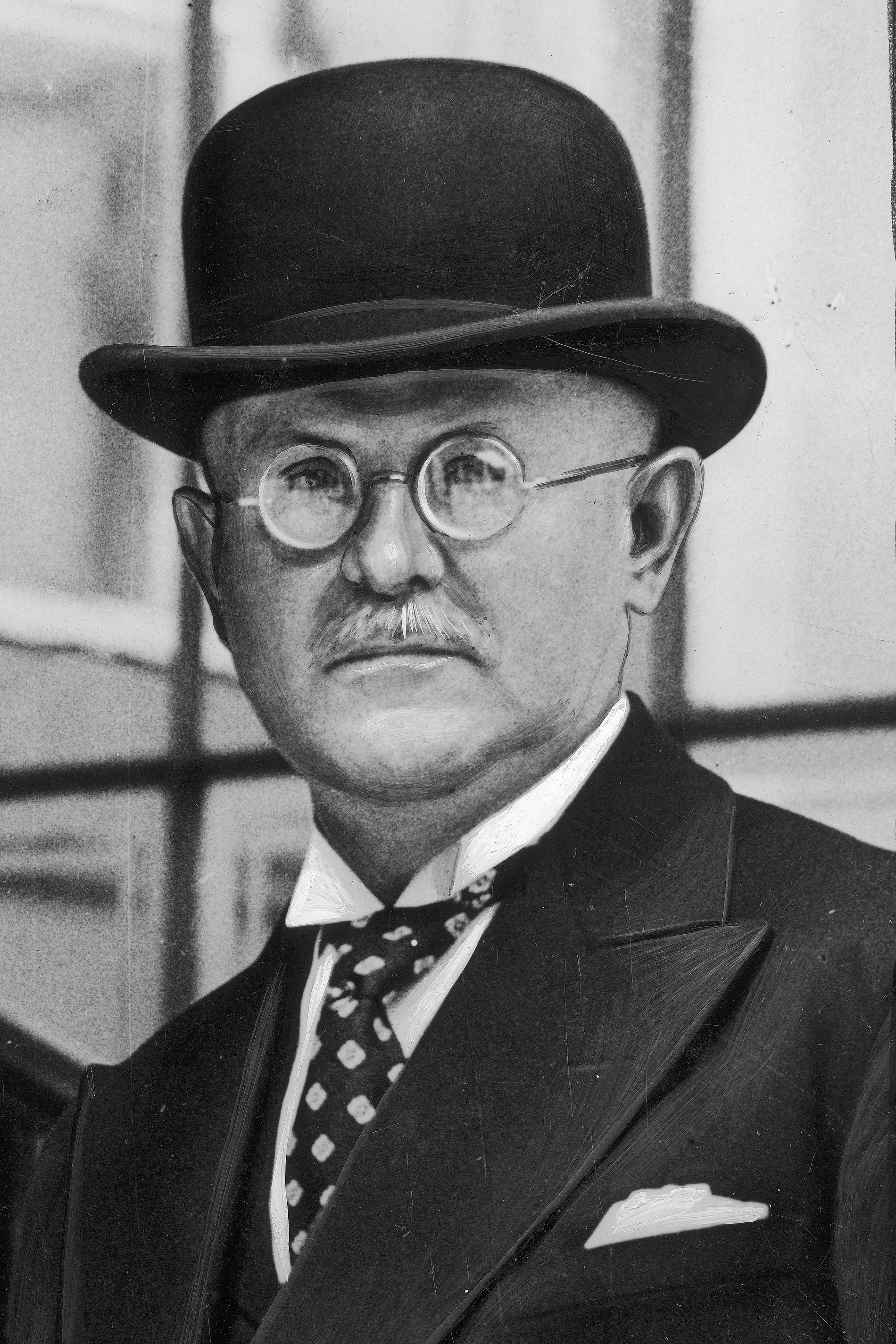
	First party	Second party	Third party
Leader	Adolf Hitler	Otto Wels; Arthur Crispien; Hans Vogel	Ernst Thälmann
Party	NSDAP	SPD	KPD
Leader's seat	Upper Bavaria	Several	Hamburg
Last election	33.1%, 196 seats	20.4%, 121 seats	16.9%, 100 seats
Seats won	288	120	81
Seat change	▲92	▼1	▼19
Popular vote	17,277,180	7,181,629	4,848,058
Percentage	43.9%	18.3%	12.3%
Swing	▲10.8 pp	▼2.1 pp	▼4.6 pp
	Fourth party	Fifth party	Sixth party
Leader	Ludwig Kaas	Alfred Hugenberg	Heinrich Held
Party	Centre	DNVP	BVP
Leader's seat	Party electoral list	Westphalia North	Lower Bavaria
Last election	11.9%, 70 seats	8.3%, 51 seats	3.1%, 20 seats
Seats won	73	52	19
Seat change	▲3	▲1	▼1
Popular vote	4,424,905	3,136,760	1,073,552
Percentage	11.3%	8.0%	2.7%
Swing	▼0.6 pp	▼0.3 pp	▼0.4 pp
Government before election
Hitler cabinet
NSDAP–DNVP
Government after election
Hitler cabinet
NSDAP–DNVP

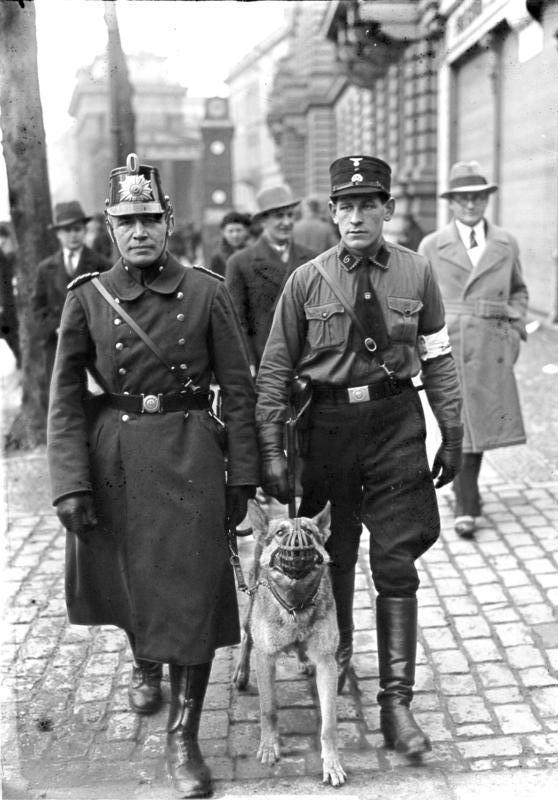
A police officer of the Sicherheitspolizei (left) and an SS man (right) with his German Shepherd, one of the 50,000 NSDAP members in Prussia appointed by the Party as a Hilfspolizei ("Auxiliary Police") officer

Federal elections were held in Germany on 5 March 1933, after the Nazi seizure of power on 30 January and just six days after the Reichstag fire. The election saw Nazi stormtroopers unleash a widespread campaign of violence against the Communist Party (KPD), left-wingers, trade unionists, the Social Democratic Party and the Centre Party. They were the last multi-party elections in a united Germany until the all-German vote in 1990, though by 1933, the democratic process had ceased to be free or fair.

The 1933 election followed the previous year's two elections (July and November) and Hitler's appointment as Chancellor on 30 January. In the months before the 1933 election, SA and SS displayed "terror, repression and propaganda ... across the land", and Nazi organizations "monitored" the vote process. In Prussia, 50,000 members of the SS, SA and Der Stahlhelm were ordered to monitor the votes by acting Interior Minister Hermann Göring, as auxiliary police.

The Nazi Party (NSDAP) gained a substantially larger proportion of votes compared to the November 1932 election, and together with its coalition partner, the German National People's Party (DNVP), secured a majority in the Reichstag. This marked the first time since 1930 that a governing coalition held a clear parliamentary majority. However, the election was far from fair. Carried out in an atmosphere of intimidation and violence against political opponents, it was skewed heavily in the Nazis' favour. Even so, they alone received only 43.9 percent of the vote, falling short of the numbers needed to govern without a partner.

Though now in possession of a working majority, Hitler pushed further. On 23 March, just two weeks after the vote, he passed the Enabling Act of 1933 with the support of the DNVP and the Centre Party, granting him the power to rule by decree. This act effectively dismantled parliamentary democracy and gave Hitler dictatorial authority. In the months that followed, the Nazi regime banned all other political parties and turned the Reichstag into a rubberstamp body composed solely of Nazis and their pro-Nazi "guests", extinguishing all remaining traces of democratic governance. This would be the last contested election held in Germany until after World War II.

== Background ==
The Nazis came to power on 30 January, when President Paul von Hindenburg appointed Hitler as Chancellor, who immediately urged the dissolution of the Reichstag and the calling of new elections. On his second day as Chancellor, Hitler opened his campaign with a nationwide radio address pledging to save the nation from the communists, which he castigated as "political nihilism." In early February, the Nazis "unleashed a campaign of violence and terror that dwarfed anything seen so far". Sturmabteilung stormtroopers began attacking trade union and Communist Party (KPD) offices and the homes of left-wingers.

In the second half of February, the violence was extended to the Social Democrats, with gangs of brownshirts breaking up Social Democrat meetings and beating up their speakers and audiences. Issues of Social Democratic newspapers were banned. Twenty newspapers of the Centre Party, a party of Catholic Germans, were banned in mid-February for criticising the new government. Government officials known to be Centre Party supporters were dismissed from their offices, and stormtroopers violently attacked party meetings in Westphalia. Only the Nazi Party and the German National People's Party were allowed to campaign untouched.

Six days before the scheduled election date, the German parliament building was set alight in the Reichstag fire, allegedly by the Dutch Communist Marinus van der Lubbe. That event reduced the popularity of the KPD and enabled Hitler to persuade Hindenburg to pass the Reichstag Fire Decree as an emergency decree according to Article 48 of the Weimar Constitution. The emergency law removed many civil liberties and allowed the arrest of Ernst Thälmann and 4,000 other leaders and members of the KPD shortly before the election, suppressing the Communist vote and consolidating the position of the Nazis.

Although Hitler could have banned the KPD outright, he opted not to do so. He feared a violent Communist uprising in the event of a ban, and he also believed the KPD's presence on the ballot could siphon off votes away from the Social Democrats. Instead, he opted to simply have Communist functionaries jailed by the thousands. The courts and prosecutors, both already hostile to the KPD long before 1933, obligingly agreed with the line that since the Reichstag fire was a Communist plot, KPD membership was an act of treason. As a result, for all intents and purposes, the KPD was "outlawed" on the day the Reichstag Fire Decree took effect and "completely banned" as of the day of the election. While the Social Democrats (SPD) were then not as heavily oppressed as the Communists, the Social Democrats were also restricted in their actions, as the party's leadership had already fled to Prague, and many members were acting only from the underground. Hence, the Reichstag fire is widely believed to have had a major effect on the outcome of the election. As a replacement parliament building and for 10 years to come, the new parliament used the Kroll Opera House for its meetings.

The resources of big business and the state were thrown behind the Nazis' campaign to achieve saturation coverage all over Germany. Brownshirts and SS patrolled and marched menacingly through the streets of cities and towns. A "combination of terror, repression and propaganda was mobilized in every... community, large and small, across the land". Irene von Goetz wrote, "In a decree issued on 17 February 1933, Göring ordered the Prussian police force to make unrestrained use of firearms in operations against political opponents (the so-called Schießerlass, or shooting decree)".

To ensure a Nazi majority in the vote, Nazi organisations also "monitored" the vote process. In Prussia, 50,000 members of the SS, SA and Der Stahlhelm were ordered to monitor the votes as so-called deputy sheriffs or auxiliary police (Hilfspolizei) in another decree by acting Interior Minister Hermann Göring.

== Results ==
Party or alliance		Votes	%	+/–	Seats	+/–
Nazi Party (NSDAP)		17,277,180	43.91	+10.82	288	+92
Social Democratic Party of Germany	Social Democratic Party	7,181,629	18.25	–2.18	120	–1
Social Democratic Party of Germany	German State Party	334,242	0.85	–0.10	5	+3
Communist Party of Germany		4,848,058	12.32	–4.54	81	–19
Centre Party		4,424,905	11.25	–0.68	73	+3
Black-White-Red Struggle Front (Note: Alliance of the German National People's Party with Der Stahlhelm and the Agricultural League.)		3,136,760	7.97	–0.37	52	+1
Bavarian People's Party		1,073,552	2.73	–0.36	19	–1
German People's Party—Christian Social People's Service—German Farmers' Party—German-Hanoverian Party	German People's Party	432,312	1.10	–0.76	2	–9
German People's Party—Christian Social People's Service—German Farmers' Party—German-Hanoverian Party	Christian Social People's Service	383,999	0.98	–0.16	4	–1
German People's Party—Christian Social People's Service—German Farmers' Party—German-Hanoverian Party	German Farmers' Party	114,048	0.29	–0.13	2	–1
German People's Party—Christian Social People's Service—German Farmers' Party—German-Hanoverian Party	German-Hanoverian Party	47,743	0.12	–0.06	0	–1
Württemberg Farmers' and Winegrowers' Association (Agricultural League)		83,839	0.21	–0.09	1	–1
Socialist Struggle Community		3,954	0.01	New	0	New
Workers' and Farmers' Struggle Community		1,110	0.00	0.00	0	0
Total		39,343,331	100.00	–	647	+63
Valid votes		39,343,331	99.21			
Invalid/blank votes		311,698	0.79			
Total votes		39,655,029	100.00			
Registered voters/turnout		44,685,764	88.74			
Source: Gonschior.de

Nazi vote share, with majorities in East Prussia (1), Frankfurt (Oder) (5), Pomerania (6), Breslau (7), Liegnitz (8), Schleswig-Holstein (13), E Hanover (15), and Chemnitz-Zwickau (30)

Social Democrat (SPD) vote share

Communist Party (KPD) vote share

Centre Party vote share, with pluralities in Cologne-Aachen (20) and Koblenz-Trier (21). In all 33 other districts, the Nazis were the largest party.

== Aftermath ==
Despite achieving a much better result than in the November 1932 election, the Nazis did not do as well as Hitler had hoped. In spite of massive violence and voter intimidation, the Nazis won only 43.9% of the vote, rather than the majority that he had expected.

Therefore, Hitler was forced to maintain his coalition with the DNVP to control the majority of seats. The Communists (KPD) lost about a quarter of their votes, and the Social Democrats suffered only moderate losses. Although the KPD had not been formally banned, it was a foregone conclusion that the KPD deputies would never be allowed to take their seats. Within a few days, all KPD representatives had been placed under arrest or gone into hiding.

Although the Nazi-DNVP coalition had enough seats to conduct the basic business of government, Hitler needed a two-thirds majority to pass the Enabling Act, which allowed the Cabinet, and effectively the Chancellor, to enact laws without the approval of the Reichstag for four years. With certain exceptions, such laws could deviate from the Weimar Constitution. Leaving nothing to chance, the Nazis used the provisions of the Reichstag Fire Decree to arrest all 81 Communist deputies, and keep several Social Democrats out of the chamber.

Hitler then obtained the necessary supermajority by persuading the Centre Party to vote with him with regard to the Enabling Act. The bill was passed on 23 March with 444 votes for and 94 against. Only the Social Democrats, led by Otto Wels, opposed the measure, which came into effect on 27 March. The bill's provisions turned the government into a de facto legal dictatorship.

Within four months, the other parties had been shuttered by outright banning or Nazi terror, and Germany had become formally a one-party state. A snap election was called for November by Hindenburg, in which voters were presented with a single list of Nazis and guest candidates, and voting was not secret: the new Reichstag thus included only NSDAP and supporting members, effectively liquidating what was left of Weimar democracy.

== See also ==
- List of Reichstag deputies in the Third Reich (1st electoral term)
