= List of SA-Obergruppenführer =

SA-Obergruppenführer
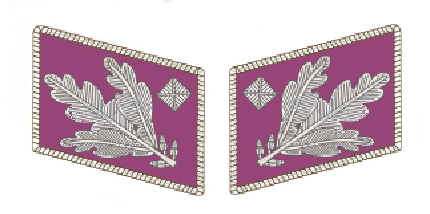
- SA Gorget patches
- Country: Nazi Germany
- Service branch: Sturmabteilung
- Abbreviation: Ogruf.
- NATO rank code: OF-8
- Formation: January 1933
- Abolished: 8 May 1945
- Next higher rank: SA-Stabschef
- Next lower rank: SA-Gruppenführer
- Equivalent ranks: General der Waffengattung

The List of SA-Obergruppenführer enumerates selected men who held the position of SA-Obergruppenführer. This was the second highest commissioned rank in the Sturmabteilung (SA), which was the largest paramilitary organization of the Nazi Party, numbering approximately 4.5 million members in June 1934. The rank was comparable to a three-star rank in English-speaking armed forces (today, equivalent to NATO OF-8). Due to the rapid growth of the organization, SA-Stabschef Ernst Röhm authorized a new large SA troop formation in July 1932, the SA-Obergruppe. Organized in September 1932, each of the five new formations (expanded to ten in January 1934) was roughly equivalent to an army corps. Each Obergruppe was made up of several SA-Gruppe, formerly the largest SA component, and was placed under the command of an SA-Obergruppenführer. This new rank was established as the senior SA general officer rank, directly above the existing rank of SA-Gruppenführer.

This is a partial list of notable individuals whose highest rank in the SA was SA-Obergruppenführer. It does not include the two individuals (Viktor Lutze and Wilhelm Schepmann) that held the rank and who subsequently attained the higher rank of SA-Stabschef. Included are not only full-time active duty SA officers, but also Nazi Party officials, politicians and government functionaries who were awarded inactive honorary (ehrenamtliche) commissions as well. Röhm instituted this practice as a means to build bridges to the Party organization after a period of great tension between the SA and the Party organization. Most of these honorary appointments went to Party officials who had some previous connection with the SA, who were military veterans and who had been active in other paramilitary or völkisch organizations.

== List of SA-Obergruppenführer ==
This table lists the SA-Obergruppenführer by the date of appointment. The first promotions to the rank became effective in January 1933 and the last known promotions took place in November 1944. The table also notes their SA, government or Party post as of the appointment date and includes a comment on their ultimate fate.

Key:	Full time or primarily an SA functionary	Full time or primarily a Nazi Party or government functionary

Name	Date of Promotion	Position at Promotion	Fate
Franz Ritter von Epp	1 January 1933	Chief, NSDAP Office of Military Policy	Died in American captivity, 1947
Hermann Göring	1 January 1933	President, Reichstag	Sentenced to death by the Nuremberg trials; suicide, 1946
Adolf Hühnlein	1 January 1933	Deputy Korpsführer, National Socialist Motor Corps	Died of cancer, 1942
Manfred von Killinger	1 January 1933	Führer, SA-Obergruppe V	Suicide, 1944
August Schneidhuber	1 January 1933	Führer, SA-Obergruppe III	Executed by firing squad in the Night of the Long Knives, 1934
Curt von Ulrich	1 January 1933	Generalinspekteur, Supreme SA Command (OSAF)	Died in Soviet captivity, 1946
Hans Georg Hofmann	1 April 1933	Police Director, Regensburg	Died of a heart attack, 1942
Edmund Heines	20 April 1933	Police President, Breslau	Executed by firing squad in the Night of the Long Knives, 1934
Paul Hocheisen	20 April 1933	Chief, SA Medical Office, (OSAF)	Died of natural causes, 1944
Hermann Reschny	20 April 1933	Führer, SA-Gruppe Österreich	Died of natural causes, 1971
Dietrich von Jagow	27 June 1933	Führer, SA-Gruppe Südwest	Suicide, 1945
Fritz Ritter von Kraußer	27 June 1933	Chief, SA Organization Office, (OSAF)	Executed by firing squad in the Night of the Long Knives, 1934
Friedrich-Wilhelm Krüger	27 June 1933	Chief, SA Training Office, (OSAF)	Suicide, 1945
Karl-Siegmund Litzmann	27 June 1933	Führer, SA-Gruppe Ostland	Died in unclear circumstances, ?1945; declared dead, 1949
Werner von Fichte	20 July 1933	Police President, Erfurt	Sentenced to 2 years by a denazification tribunal, 1949; released for time-served; died, 1955
Franz Seldte	26 July 1933	Reichsminister of Labor	Died in American captivity, 1947
Johann Baptist Fuchs	9 November 1933	OSAF Plenipotentiary for Bavaria	Died of natural causes, 1938
Franz Xaver Schwarz	9 November 1933	Treasurer, Nazi Party	Died in American captivity, 1947
Heinrich Schoene	24 April 1934	Führer, SA-Gruppe Ostland	Died in battle at the Battle of Konigsberg, 1945
Wilhelm Brückner	9 November 1934	Chief Adjutant to Adolf Hitler	Sentenced to 3-and-a-half years by a denazification tribunal, 1948; died, 1954
Arthur Böckenhauer	9 November 1936	Chief, SA Courts and Legal Office, (OSAF)	Died of natural causes, 1953
Josef Bürckel	9 November 1936	Gauleiter, Gau Saarpfalz	Died of natural causes, 1944
Otto Herzog	9 November 1936	Stabsführer, (OSAF)	Died in battle at the Battle of Breslau, 1945
Siegfried Kasche	9 November 1936	Führer, SA-Gruppe Niedersachsen	Sentenced to death by Croatia; hanged, 1947
Bernhard Rust	9 November 1936	Reichsminister, Science, Education & Culture	Suicide, 1945
Josef Terboven	9 November 1936	Gauleiter, Gau Essen	Suicide, 1945
Friedrich Karl Florian	30 January 1937	Gauleiter, Gau Düsseldorf	Suicide, 1945
Adolf-Heinz Beckerle	9 November 1937	Police President, Frankfurt	Sentenced to 25 years by the Soviet Union, 1951; released, 1955; died, 1976
Heinrich Bennecke	9 November 1937	Führer, SA-Gruppe Pommern	Died of natural causes, 1972
Hermann Brauneck	9 November 1937	Chief, SA Health Services, (OSAF)	Died in an airstrike at Kerch, 1942
Hans Frank	9 November 1937	Reichsminister without portfolio	Sentenced to death by the Nuremberg trials; hanged, 1946
Wilhelm Helfer	9 November 1937	Führer, SA-Gruppe Hochland	Died of natural causes, 1954
Wilhelm Jahn	9 November 1937	Police President, Halle	Died of natural causes, 1952
Max Jüttner	9 November 1937	Chief, SA Leadership Office, (OSAF)	Interned until 1947; died, 1963
Hanns Kerrl	9 November 1937	Reichsminister, Church Affairs	Died of a heart attack, 1941
Hermann Kriebel	9 November 1937	German envoy to China	Died of natural causes, 1941
Hinrich Lohse	9 November 1937	Gauleiter, Gau Schleswig-Holstein	Sentenced to 10 years by a denazification tribunal, 1948; released, 1951; died, 1964
Hanns Ludin	9 November 1937	Führer, SA-Gruppe Südwest	Sentenced to death by Czechoslovakia; hanged, 1947
Max Luyken	9 November 1937	Chief, SA Education Main Office, (OSAF)	Died in battle in the Battle of Berlin, 1945
Joachim Meyer-Quade	9 November 1937	Führer, SA-Gruppe Nordmark	Died in battle in the Invasion of Poland, 1939
Martin Mutschmann	9 November 1937	Gauleiter, Gau Saxony	Sentenced to death by the Soviet Union; shot, 1947
Fritz Reinhardt	9 November 1937	State Secretary, Reich Finance Ministry	Sentenced to 4 years by a denazification tribunal, 1949; reduced to 3 years; released for time-served; died, 1969
Fritz Sauckel	9 November 1937	Gauleiter, Gau Thuringia	Sentenced to death by the Nuremberg trials; hanged, 1946
Baldur von Schirach	9 November 1937	Reichsjugendführer	Sentenced to 20 years by the Nuremberg trials, 1946; released, 1966; died, 1974
Julius Streicher	9 November 1937	Gauleiter, Gau Franconia	Sentenced to death by the Nuremberg trials; hanged, 1946
Adolf Wagner	9 November 1937	Gauleiter, Gau Munich-Upper Bavaria	Died of a stroke, 1944
Gerhard Wagner	9 November 1937	Reich Health Leader	Died of cancer, 1939
Josef Wagner	9 November 1937	Gauleiter, Gau Silesia and Gau Westphalia-South	Arrested after the 20 July plot; executed by hanging, 1945
Wilhelm Weiss	9 November 1937	Editor-in-Chief, Völkischer Beobachter	Sentenced to 3 years by a denazification tribunal, 1949; released for time-served; died, 1950
Prince August Wilhelm of Prussia	9 November 1938	Prussian State Councilor	Sentenced to 2-and-a-half years by a denazification tribunal, 1949; released for time-served; died, 1949
Charles Edward, Duke of Saxe-Coburg and Gotha	9 November 1938	President, German Red Cross	Interned until 1946; fined by a denazification tribunal, 1949; died, 1954
Kurt Günther	9 November 1938	Führer, SA-Gruppe Thüringen	Sentenced to death by Thuringia; executed by firing squad, 1947
Wolf-Heinrich Graf von Helldorff	9 November 1938	Police President, Berlin	Arrested for participation in the 20 July plot; executed by hanging, 1944
Rudolf Jordan	9 November 1938	Gauleiter, Gau Magdeburg-Anhalt	Sentenced to 25 years by the Soviet Union 1950; released, 1955; died, 1988
Emil Ketterer	9 November 1938	SA Liaison, Reich Health Leader	Died of natural causes, 1959
Erich Koch	9 November 1938	Gauleiter, Gau East Prussia	Sentenced to death by Poland; commuted to life; died in captivity, 1986
Christian Mergenthaler	9 November 1938	Ministerpräsident, Württemberg	Interned, 1945; jailed by a denazification tribunal, 1948; released, 1949; died, 1980
Alfred Meyer	9 November 1938	Gauleiter, Gau Westphalia-North	Suicide, 1945
Philipp, Landgrave of Hesse	9 November 1938	Oberpräsident, Hesse-Nassau	Interned until 1947; died, 1980
Karl Rover	9 November 1938	Gauleiter, Gau Weser-Ems	Died of natural causes, 1942
Franz Schwede	9 November 1938	Gauleiter, Gau Pomerania	Sentenced to 9 years by a denazification tribunal, 1948; and 10 years by a German criminal court, 1951; released, 1956; died, 1960
Ludwig Siebert	9 November 1938	Ministerpräsident, Bavaria	Died of a heart attack, 1942
Jakob Sprenger	9 November 1938	Gauleiter, Gau Hesse-Nassau	Suicide, 1945
Fritz Todt	9 November 1938	Chief, Organisation Todt	Died in a plane crash, 1942
Hans von Tschammer und Osten	9 November 1938	Reich Sports Leader	Died of pneumonia, 1943
Friedrich Haselmayr	11 April 1939	Führer, OSAF Staff	Died of natural causes, 1965
Heinrich Böhmcker	6 October 1940	Führer, SA-Gruppe Nordsee	Died of a heart attack, 1944
Heinrich-Georg Graf Finck von Finckenstein	30 January 1941	Führer, OSAF Staff	Died of natural causes, 1984
Herbert Fust	30 January 1941	Führer, SA-Gruppe Kurpfalz	Died of natural causes, 1974
Günther Gräntz	30 January 1941	Führer, SA-Gruppe Westmark	Died in battle at the Battle of Berlin, 1945
Arthur Hess	30 January 1941	Führer, OSAF Staff	Died of natural causes, 1959
Franz Ritter von Hörauf	30 January 1941	Führer, OSAF staff	Died of natural causes, 1957
Willy Liebel	August 1941	Oberbürgermeister, Nuremberg	Suicide, 1945
Heinrich Haake	24 January 1942	Landeshauptmann, Rhine Province	Died in British captivity, 1945
Joseph Berchtold	30 January 1942	Deputy Editor-in-Chief, Völkischer Beobachter	Interned, 1945; died, 1962
Wilhelm Kleinmann	30 January 1942	State Secretary, Reich Ministry of Transport	Died in Soviet captivity, 1945
Paul Giesler	30 January 1943	Gauleiter, Gau Munich-Upper Bavaria	Suicide, 1945
Alfred Proksch	20 April 1943	Trustee of Labour, Vienna and Lower Austria	Sentenced to 4 years by a Vienna court; died, 1981
August Eigruber	9 November 1943	Gauleiter, Reichsgau Oberdonau	Sentenced to death by the Dachau trials; hanged, 1947
Walter Köhler	9 November 1943	Ministerpräsident, Baden	Sentenced to 3 years by a denazification tribunal, 1948; released for time-served; died, 1989
Willy Marschler	9 November 1943	Ministerpräsident, Thuringia	Interned until 1946; died, 1952
Siegfried Uiberreither	9 November 1943	Gauleiter, Reichsgau Styria	Interned, 1945; escaped 1947; died, 1984.
Fritz Bracht	20 April 1944	Gauleiter, Gau Upper Silesia	Suicide, 1945
Hartmann Lauterbacher	20 April 1944	Gauleiter, Gau Southern Hanover-Brunswick	Acquitted at the Dachau trials; later worked as a West German spy; died, 1988
Franz Bock	9 November 1944	Führer, SA-Gruppe Niederrhein	Died of natural causes, 1974
Leopold Damian	9 November 1944	Führer, SA-Gruppe Oberrhein	Died of natural causes, 1971

Junior rank SA-Gruppenführer	SA rank SA-Obergruppenführer	Senior rank SA-Stabschef

== See also ==
- Liste der SA-Gruppen und -Obergruppen
- Obergruppenführer
- Stabschef

== Sources ==
- Campbell, Bruce (1998). The SA Generals and the Rise of Nazism. Lexington: University Press of Kentucky. ISBN 978-0-813-12047-8.
- Klee, Ernst (2007). Das Personenlexikon zum Dritten Reich. Wer war was vor und nach 1945. Frankfurt-am-Main: Fischer-Taschenbuch-Verlag. ISBN 978-3-596-16048-8
- Lepage, Jean-Denis (2016). Hitler's Stormtroopers: The SA, The Nazi's Brownshirts, 1922–1945. Frontline Books. ISBN 978-1-399-07721-7.
- Littlejohn, David (1990). The SA 1921-45: Hitler's Stormtroopers (Men-At Arms Series, 220). Oxford: Osprey Publishing Ltd. ISBN 978-0-850-45944-9.
- McNab, Chris (2009). The Third Reich: 1933-1945. Amber Books Ltd. ISBN 978-1-906-62651-8.
- Miller, Michael D. & Schulz, Andreas (2012). Gauleiter: The Regional Leaders of the Nazi Party and Their Deputies, 1925–1945, Volume 1 (Herbert Albrecht – H. Wilhelm Hüttmann). R. James Bender Publishing. ISBN 978-1-932-97021-0.
- Miller, Michael D. & Schulz, Andreas (2017). Gauleiter: The Regional Leaders of the Nazi Party and Their Deputies, 1925–1945, Volume 2 (Georg Joel – Dr. Bernhard Rust). R. James Bender Publishing. ISBN 978-1-932-97032-6.
- Miller, Michael D. & Schulz, Andreas (2021). Gauleiter: The Regional Leaders of the Nazi Party and Their Deputies, 1925–1945, Volume 3 (Fritz Sauckel – Hans Zimmermann). Fonthill Media. ISBN 978-1-781-55826-3.
- Miller, Michael D. & Schulz, Andreas (2015). Leaders of the Storm Troops, Volume 1. Solihull, England: Helion & Company. ISBN 978-1-909-98287-1.
- Siemens, Daniel (2017). Stormtroopers: A New History of Hitler's Brownshirts. New Haven: Yale University Press. ISBN 978-0-300-19681-8.
- Stockhorst, Erich (1985). 5000 Köpfe: Wer War Was im 3. Reich. Arndt. ISBN 978-3-887-41116-9.
- Zentner, Christian; Bedürftig, Friedemann, eds. (1997) [1991]. The Encyclopedia of the Third Reich. New York: Da Capo Press. ISBN 978-0-306-80793-0.
