= Wilhelm Jahn (SA general) =

German Nazi SA general (1891–1952)

Police President, Stettin
- In office 11 January 1939 – 31 July 1943

Police President, Halle
- In office 12 February 1936 – 10 January 1939

Führer, Flieger-Landesgruppe IV German Air Sports Association
- In office July 1934 – 31 March 1935

Additional positions
- 1933–1934: Aviation Advisor, SA–Obergruppe VI
- 1932–1933: Chief of Staff, SA–Obergruppe II

Personal details
- Born: 2 February 1891 Soest, Province of Westphalia, Kingdom of Prussia, German Empire
- Died: 21 September 1952 (aged 61) Göttingen, Lower Saxony, West Germany
- Party: Nazi Party
- Other political affiliations: German National People's Party; Der Stahlhelm; Organisation Escherich
- Profession: Bank clerk Automobile sales manager
- Civilian awards: Golden Party Badge; Brunswick Rally Badge

Military service
- Allegiance: German Empire
- Branch/service: Imperial German Army; Luftstreitkräfte
- Years of service: 1914–1918
- Rank: Leutnant
- Battles/wars: World War I
- Military awards: Iron Cross, 1st and 2nd class

Wilhelm Jahn (2 February 1891 – 21 September 1952) was a German member of the Nazi Party and its paramilitary organization, the Sturmabteilung (SA), who rose to the rank of SA-Obergruppenführer. He served as the Police President in Halle and Stettin (today, Szczecin) in Nazi Germany from February 1936 through July 1943.

== Early life ==
Jahn was born in Soest, the son of a newspaper publisher. He attended the local Volksschule and Gymnasium and then served a three year apprenticeship in banking from 1908 to 1911. He was employed as a bank clerk for the next few years. At the outset of the First World War, he volunteered for military service with the Imperial German Army and was deployed to the front lines in December 1914 with Foot Artillery Battalion 18. He was subsequently transferred to Foot Artillery Battalion 39, and was commissioned a Leutnant in May 1916 with Landwehr Foot Artillery Battalion 11. In January 1917, he became the deputy artillery battery commander in Foot Artillery Battalion 59. In March 1917, he transferred to the Luftstreitkräfte and trained as a pilot, flying with Flieger-Abteilung (Aviation Detachment) 224 and 40 as a pilot and technical officer until the end of the war. He was discharged from military service in December 1918, having earned the Iron Cross, 1st and 2nd class.

Returning to civilian life, Jahn resumed his banking career. Typical of many returning German war veterans of this time, Jahn joined right-wing political parties, Wehrverbände (military associations) and völkisch groups. He began to be politically active in 1920, and joined the conservative German National People's Party but left it the same year. In January 1921, he joined the antisemitic paramilitary Organisation Escherich, headed by Georg Escherich, and became the business leader of the group in Osnabrück. In March of the same year, he also joined the conservative and nationalistic military veterans association Der Stahlhelm.

== Career in the Nazi Party Sturmabteilung (SA) ==
In July 1922, Jahn became a member of the Nazi Party in the Ortsgruppe (local group) Osnabrück. As an early Party member, he would later be awarded the Golden Party Badge. Between 1922 and 1924, he worked as a self-employed electrical equipment salesman in Osnabrück where he founded a local Sturmabteilung (SA) group in the spring of 1923. When the SA was banned in the aftermath of the failed Beer Hall Putsch in November 1923, Jahn joined the Frontbann, an SA front organization headed by Ernst Röhm.

From 1925 to 1930, Jahn worked as an automobile salesman and sales manager in Osnabrück where he rejoined the local Party on 16 August 1926 (membership number 42,535). He also rejoined the SA in December 1928, and became a full-time SA officer on 1 January 1931, with the rank of SA-Standartenführer. He was assigned for the next few months as the adjutant to Viktor Lutze, the Deputy Supreme SA Führer, North. On 15 April 1931, Jahn became the Chief of Staff to SA-Gruppe-Nord. While in this post, he participated in the SA mass rally in Braunschweig on 18 October 1931, for which he would be awarded the Brunswick Rally Badge.

Jahn was promoted to SA-Oberführer in December 1931. From 1 July to 14 October 1932, he was given his own command as Führer of SA-Gruppe Nordsee, headquartered in Bremen. He was then promoted to SA-Gruppenführer and appointed as Chief of Staff of the SA-Obergruppe II in Hanover, overseeing four SA -Gruppe (Niederrhein, Niedersachsen, Nordsee and Westfalen), again under the command of Viktor Lutze. On 15 July 1933, he assumed the post of Aviation Advisor to the now renamed Obergruppe VI. However, he left the SA on 24 September 1934, after taking a position as a full-time leader of Flieger-Landesgruppe (State Aviation Group) IV of the German Air Sports Association in July. He remained employed there until 31 March 1935, and then reentered the SA on 1 October as a reserve Führer in SA-Gruppe Niedersachsen.

On 12 February 1936, Jahn was named as the acting Police President of Halle, an appointment that was made permanent effective 1 October. He was also placed in charge of the local Kriminalpolizei office and assigned as the local air raid protection coordinator. On 20 July 1937, he was given a five-year appointment as a lay judge on the People's Court. He reached his highest rank in the SA on 9 November 1937 when he was promoted to SA-Obergruppenführer. In April 1938, Jahn unsuccessfully sought a seat as a deputy of the Reichstag. On 11 January 1939, he was transferred from Halle to Stettin (today, Szczecin) where he took up the duties of Police President and air raid protection coordinator. He left this post in July 1943, and then served as a reserve SA-Führer in SA-Gruppe Pommern (August 1943 – November 1943) and SA-Gruppe Elbe (December 1943 – May 1945) until the fall of the Nazi regime.Involvement in atrocities: As the Police President in the German cities of Halle and Stettin (now Szczecin, Poland) between 1936 and 1943, he oversaw the implementation of Nazi policy. His duties would have included enforcing antisemitic laws and regulations and using the police apparatus to persecute and suppress Jewish people and other groups targeted by the Nazis.

Little is documented of Jahn's post-war life, and he died in Göttingen on 21 September 1952.

=== SA ranks ===
SA ranks
Date	Rank
1 January 1931	SA-Standartenführer
18 December 1931	SA-Oberführer
15 October 1932	SA-Gruppenführer
9 November 1937	SA-Obergruppenführer

== Sources ==
- Campbell, Bruce (1998). The SA Generals and the Rise of Nazism. Lexington: University Press of Kentucky. ISBN 978-0-813-12047-8.
- Miller, Michael D.; Schulz, Andreas (2015). Leaders of the Storm Troops. Vol. 1. Solihull, England: Helion & Company. ISBN 978-1-909-98287-1.
- Stockhorst, Erich (1985). 5000 Köpfe: Wer War Was im 3. Reich. Arndt. ISBN 978-3-887-41116-9.
