= Fritz Schlessmann =

German Nazi politician, police chief and SS officer (1899–1964)

Acting Gauleiter of Gau Essen
- In office 24 April 1940 – 8 April 1945

Deputy Gauleiter of Gau Essen
- In office 9 November 1939 – 8 April 1945
- Preceded by: Heinrich Unger
- Succeeded by: Position abolished

Polizeipräsident of Essen
- In office 1 October 1937 – 31 December 1939
- Preceded by: Karl Zech
- Succeeded by: Karl Gutenberger

Polizeipräsident of Bochum
- In office 27 October 1933 – 30 September 1937
- Succeeded by: Walther Oberhaidacher

Deputy Gauleiter of Gau Essen
- In office 1 August 1930 – 31 December 1930
- Preceded by: Position created
- Succeeded by: Heinrich Unger

Personal details
- Born: Georg Friedrich Schlessmann; 11 March 1899 Essen, Rhine Province, Kingdom of Prussia, German Empire
- Died: 31 March 1964 (aged 65) Dortmund, North Rhine-Westphalia, West Germany
- Party: Nazi Party (NSDAP)
- Occupation: Locksmith; Engineer
- Civilian awards: Nuremberg Party Day Badge; Brunswick Rally Badge; Golden Party Badge

Military service
- Allegiance: German Empire
- Branch/service: Imperial German Navy
- Years of service: 1916–1919
- Rank: Seaman
- Unit: U-Boat 100
- Battles/wars: World War I
- Military awards: Iron Cross, 2nd class War Merit Cross, 1st and 2nd class with swords

Fritz Schlessmann, born Georg Friedrich Schlessmann (11 March 1899 – 31 March 1964) was a Nazi Party Deputy Gauleiter of Gau Essen and served as the acting Gauleiter for most of the Second World War. He was also a prominent police official and an SS-Obergruppenführer. Following the end of the war, he underwent denazification proceedings and was sentenced to five years imprisonment.

== Early life ==
Schlessmann, the son of a locksmith, attended Volksschule and Oberrealschule in Essen. He left school in 1914 without attaining his diploma and worked as an apprentice locksmith in the Krupp factory until May 1916. He then joined the Imperial German Navy as a one-year volunteer in the First World War. He was stationed first in Kiel, then in Wilhelmshaven with the U-boat fleet. He was assigned to U-100 until discharged after the end of the war in November 1918, and was awarded the Iron Cross, 2nd class. In March 1919, he briefly reentered the navy and served as a machinist on a minesweeper until again discharged in May. He returned to work as a locksmith in Heidelberg and Wertheim am Main. He also served with the Freikorps Roßbach in opposing the Ruhr uprising in March 1920. For the next two years, Schlessmann trained as a technician at state mechanical engineering schools in Essen and Elberfeld, passing his engineering examinations in August 1922.

== Nazi career ==
On 17 December 1922, Schlessmann became a member of the Nazi Party (NSDAP), co-founding the Ortsgruppe (local group) in Essen and becoming the Deputy Ortsgruppenleiter. As an early Party member, he later would be awarded the Golden Party Badge. At the same time, he joined the Party’s paramilitary unit, the Sturmabteilung (SA) becoming the SA-Führer in Essen. During this period, he was working as a construction designer in the Krupp works in Essen until being fired in December 1923 for excessive absenteeism as the result of his SA activities. He remained unemployed for the next two years.

Following the failed Beer Hall Putsch in November 1923, the Nazi Party was outlawed and Schlessmann joined the German Völkisch Freedom Party. After the ban on the Nazi Party was lifted, Schlessmann rejoined it on 15 December 1925 (membership number 25,248). He resumed his duties as Deputy Ortsgruppenleiter and SA leader in Essen, reaching the rank of SA-Standartenführer in 1927. Finding work in a screw factory in Essen in December 1926, he worked his way up to become the deputy plant director until again being discharged for chronic absenteeism at the end of January 1931. In August 1929, Schlessmann attended the Party rally in Nuremberg and was awarded the Nuremberg Party Day Badge. In May 1930, he left the SA and joined the Schutzstaffel (SS number 2,480). In August 1930, he was appointed Deputy Gauleiter in Gau Essen under Josef Terboven but remained in this post only until 31 December. Attaining the rank of SS-Standartenführer in March 1931, Schlessmann was named the SS leader in Bochum. He was present at the founding of the Harzburg Front in October 1931, and also attended the SA rally in Braunschweig the same month, for which he was awarded the Brunswick Rally Badge.

From April 1932 until its dissolution by the Nazis in October 1933, Schlessmann sat as a member of the Landtag of Prussia. Following the Nazi seizure of power, he was elected to the Reichstag from electoral constituency 18 (Westphalia South) in November 1933 and retained this Reichstag seat until the fall of the Nazi regime. From 1935 to 1937, he was also a member of the Prussian Provincial Council (Provinzialrat) for the Province of Westphalia. Schlessmann was named acting Polizeipräsident (police chief) in Bochum on 27 October 1933; his appointment was made permanent on 1 April 1934. In November 1933, he became Führer of SS-Abschnitt (district) XXV with headquarters in Bochum, serving until October 1937. On 1 October 1937, he was reassigned as Polizeipräsident and Führer of SS-Abschnitt V in Essen. On 9 November 1939, he was again appointed to the position of Deputy Gauleiter in Essen under Terboven. At his own request, Schlessmann was relieved of his police post on 31 December 1939 in order to devote himself full-time to his work as a Party official.

After the defeat of Norway in the Second World War, Terboven was appointed Reichskommissar for the Reichskommissariat Norwegen on 24 April 1940, while formally retaining his position as Gauleiter of Essen. Schlessmann then was made acting Gauleiter, charged with administering the Gau in Terboven's absence. On 30 January 1942, Schlessmann was promoted to SS-Gruppenführer and also assigned to the staff of Reichsführer-SS Heinrich Himmler. As acting Gauleiter, Schlessmann had responsibility for air raid defense measures in Essen throughout the war. As a large industrial center and the site of the Krupp armaments works, Essen was a frequent target of Allied bombing raids. In the fall of 1944, Schlessmann was placed in charge of the local Volkssturm forces in Essen and was also charged with improving the fortifications along the area of the Westwall defensive line adjacent to his Gau. During the course of the war, he was awarded the War Merit Cross, 1st and 2nd class with swords. He was promoted to the rank of SS-Obergruppenführer on 9 November 1944.

== Post-war ==
After exhorting the populace of Essen to fight to the last man as the Allied forces approached the city, Schlessmann went into hiding with his 24-year-old secretary and mistress, under the alias "Fritz Selig". However, after the fall of Essen he was arrested by the US Army on 8 April 1945 and taken to the Staumühle internment camp near Paderborn. In a 1947 court proceeding in Detmold, he was sentenced to five years in prison, which he served until 13 June 1950, when he was released from the Esterwegen internment camp. He underwent denazification in Düsseldorf and was categorized as Category III (minor offender). He then worked as a salesman and gas station proprietor in Dortmund.

== SS ranks ==
SS ranks
Rank	Date
SS-Sturmbannführer	1 January 1931
SS-Standartenführer	8 March 1931
SS-Oberführer	9 November 1933
SS-Brigadeführer	30 January 1936
SS-Gruppenführer	30 January 1942
SS-Obergruppenführer	9 November 1944

== Sources ==
- Information about Fritz Schlessmann in the Reichstag database
- Miller, Michael D.; Schulz, Andreas (2021). Gauleiter: The Regional Leaders of the Nazi Party and Their Deputies, 1925–1945. Vol. 3 (Fritz Sauckel – Hans Zimmermann). Fonthill Media. ISBN 978-1-781-55826-3.
- Williams, Max (2017). SS Elite: The Senior Leaders of Hitler's Praetorian Guard. Vol. 3. Fonthill Media LLC. ISBN 978-1-78155-638-2.
