= Brunswick Rally Badge =

Nazi Party national award

- Brunswick Rally Badge (Pattern 2)
- Country: Nazi Germany
- Presented by: Nazi Party
- Eligibility: Attendance at the Brunswick Rally of 17–18 October 1931
- Motto: S – A Treffen Braunschweig 17./18. Oktober 1931
- Status: Obsolete, illegal

Precedence
- Next (higher): Nuremberg Party Day Badge
- Next (lower): Golden Party Badge

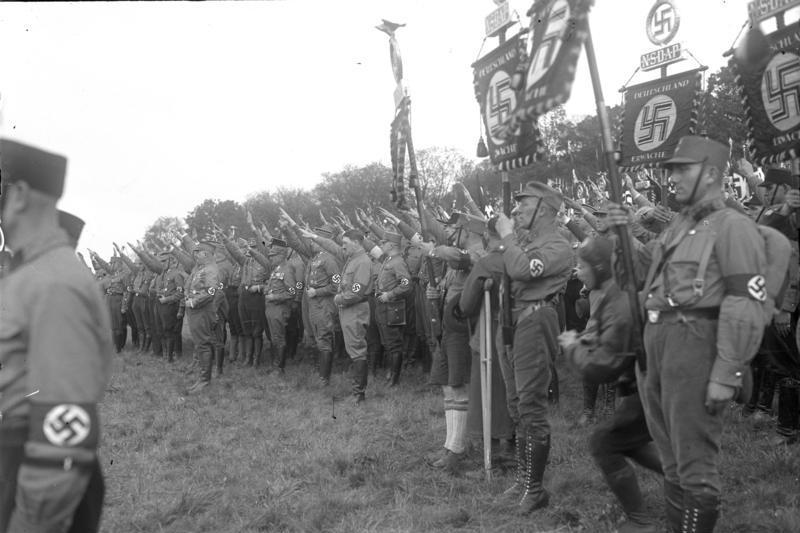
The rally in Braunschweig

Brunswick Rally Badge, also known as the Badge of the SA Rally at Brunswick 1931 (German: Das Abzeichen vom SA – Treffen in Braunschweig 1931), was the third badge recognised as a national award of the Nazi Party (NSDAP). A special Party honour badge, it was awarded to those Party members who had attended the SA assembly at the city of Braunschweig in the Free State of Brunswick on 17–18 October 1931. After the establishment of Nazi Germany, the badge formally was given precedence as the third highest Party award in a decree of 6 November 1936.

== Background ==
On 11 October 1931, components of the nationalist opposition to the Weimar Republic, including Adolf Hitler's Nazi Party, Alfred Hugenberg's conservative German National People's Party and Franz Seldte's veterans organization Der Stahlhelm, gathered at a rally in Bad Harzburg to form a united opposition force, the Harzburg Front. Hitler, not comfortable with the more mainstream conservative elements, only agreed to take part with reluctance. To his disappointment, the Stahlhelm contingent outnumbered the Nazi paramilitary units. He also felt resentful sharing the limelight with Hugenberg and Seldte. He refused to attend the joint luncheon with the other nationalist leaders. He stayed to review the march-past of the Nazi participants but, after keeping them waiting for nearly a half-hour, abruptly left the proceedings before the procession of the Stahlhelm began.

== The rally ==
One week later, Hitler staged his own rally in Braunschweig (Brunswick). Thirty-eight special trains and over five-thousand trucks brought Sturmabteilung (SA) and Schutzstaffel (SS) men from all over Germany. They planned a massive march-past and a huge torchlight parade, the likes of which neither the other organizations nor the government could match. The rally was intended to show both strength in strife-weary Germany and loyalty to their leader. This was over fifteen months before Hitler came to national power as the Chancellor of Germany in January, 1933. A total of 104,000 SA and SS men participated in a six-hour march in review before Hitler and the first inspection of the SA Motor and NSKK (National Socialist Motor Corps) units. The Brunswick rally was hosted by SA-Gruppe Nord under the leadership of then SA-Gruppenführer Viktor Lutze. At the rally, the SA assured Hitler of their loyalty and Hitler in turn increased the size of the SA with the creation of 24 new Standarten (regiment-sized formations). Several years later in 1934, Hitler rewarded Lutze's loyalty by appointing him as the SA-Stabschef, succeeding Ernst Röhm who was murdered during the Night of the Long Knives.

== The badge ==
The badge was to commemorate the event that took place, and to honour the participants of the mass rally. To be able to obtain by purchase and wear the badge, the Party member had to have officially attended the rally. The badge could only be worn on the left breast side of a uniform. It was made in two types; Pattern 1: measured 37mm wide by 50mm high. It had the Party eagle at the top, clutching a small wreath enclosing a swastika, and a larger oak leaf wreath around the outside rim. At the bottom of the oak leaf wreath was a bow. Inside the wreath was inscribed, S—A Treffen Braunschweig 17./18. Oktober 1931. The second pattern measured 37 mm (1.5 in) wide by 52 mm (2.0 in) high but otherwise had the same basic design as the first pattern. Some early badges were stamped out of tin and were silver in colour. Later ones were stamped with a solid back and were grey in colour. The permission to wear the badge had to be confirmed by the Senior SA Party leader or above. The wearing of the badge could be revoked by SA-Stabschef Lutze or his successors.

== Precedence ==
In a decree signed 6 November 1936, Hitler gave new orders of precedence for the "Orders and Awards" of Nazi Germany. The top NSDAP awards were listed in this order: 1. Coburg Badge; 2. Nuremberg (Nürnberg) Party Badge of 1929; 3. SA Rally Badge at Brunswick 1931; 4. Golden Party Badge; 5. Blood Order (Blutorden); followed by the individual Gau badges and the Golden Hitler Youth Badge.

== Selected recipients ==
- Erich von dem Bach-Zelewski
- Herbert Backe
- Adolf Beckerle
- Arthur Böckenhauer
- Philipp Bouhler
- Hermann Brauneck
- Walter Buch
- Leonardo Conti
- Kurt Daluege
- Leopold Damian
- Karl von Eberstein
- Heinrich-Georg Graf Finck von Finckenstein
- Albert Forster
- Herbert Fust
- Paul Giesler
- Günther Gräntz
- August Heissmeyer
- Wilhelm Helfer
- Paul Hennicke
- Otto Herzog
- Richard Hildebrandt
- Heinrich Himmler
- Franz Ritter von Hörauf
- Hans Georg Hofmann
- Dietrich von Jagow
- Wilhelm Jahn
- Friedrich Jeckeln
- Richard Jungclaus
- Fritz Katzmann
- Karl Kaufmann
- Kurt Kaul
- Wilhelm Koppe
- Viktor Lutze
- Walter Maass
- Joachim Meyer-Quade
- Wilhelm Murr
- Philipp, Landgrave of Hesse
- Fritz Sauckel
- Hans Schemm
- Baldur von Schirach
- Fritz Schlessmann
- Gregor Strasser
- Julius Streicher

== See also ==
- Political decorations of the Nazi Party

== Sources ==
- Angolia, John (1989). For Führer and Fatherland: Political & Civil Awards of the Third Reich. R. James Bender Publishing. ISBN 0912138165.
- Bullock, Alan (1962). Hitler: A Study in Tyranny. New York: Harper Torchbooks. ISBN 978-0-060-92020-3.
- Doehle, Heinrich (1995) [1943]. Medals & Decorations of the Third Reich: Badges, Decorations, Insignia. Reddick Enterprises. ISBN 0962488348.
- Dombrowski, Hanns (1940). Orders, Ehrenzeichen und Titel.
- Herzstein, Robert Edwin (2004) [1980]. The Nazis. Time-Life Books, Inc. ISBN 978-1-844-47193-5.
- Kershaw, Ian (2008). Hitler: A Biography. W.W. Norton & Co. ISBN 978-0-393-33761-7.
- Miller, Michael D.; Schulz, Andreas (2012). Gauleiter: The Regional Leaders of the Nazi Party and Their Deputies, 1925–1945. Vol. 1 (Herbert Albrecht – H. Wilhelm Hüttmann). R. James Bender Publishing. ISBN 978-1-932-97021-0.
- Miller, Michael D.; Schulz, Andreas (2017). Gauleiter: The Regional Leaders of the Nazi Party and Their Deputies, 1925–1945. Vol. 2 (Georg Joel – Dr. Bernhard Rust). R. James Bender Publishing. ISBN 978-1-932-97032-6.
- Miller, Michael D.; Schulz, Andreas (2021). Gauleiter: The Regional Leaders of the Nazi Party and Their Deputies, 1925–1945. Vol. 3 (Fritz Sauckel –- Hans Zimmermann). Fonthill Media. ISBN 978-1-781-55826-3.
- Miller, Michael D.; Schulz, Andreas (2015). Leaders of the Storm Troops. Vol. 1. Solihull, England: Helion & Company. ISBN 978-1-909-98287-1.
- Miller, Michael D. (2006). Leaders of the SS & German Police. Vol. 1 Reichsführer SS – Gruppenführer (Georg Ahrens to Karl Gutenberger). R. James Bender Publishing. ISBN 978-9-329-70037-2.
- Miller, Michael D. (2015). Leaders of the SS & German Police. Vol. 2 Reichsführer SS – Gruppenführer (Hans Haltermann to Walter Kruger). R. James Bender Publishing. ISBN 978-1-932-97025-8.
