= German Order =

German Order refers to:

- German Order (decoration), the highest decoration that the Nazi Party could bestow on an individual
- Germanenorden (German Order), the völkisch secret society in early 20th-century Germany
- Another name for the Teutonic Knights
