= Nuremberg Party Day Badge =

Nazi Party national award

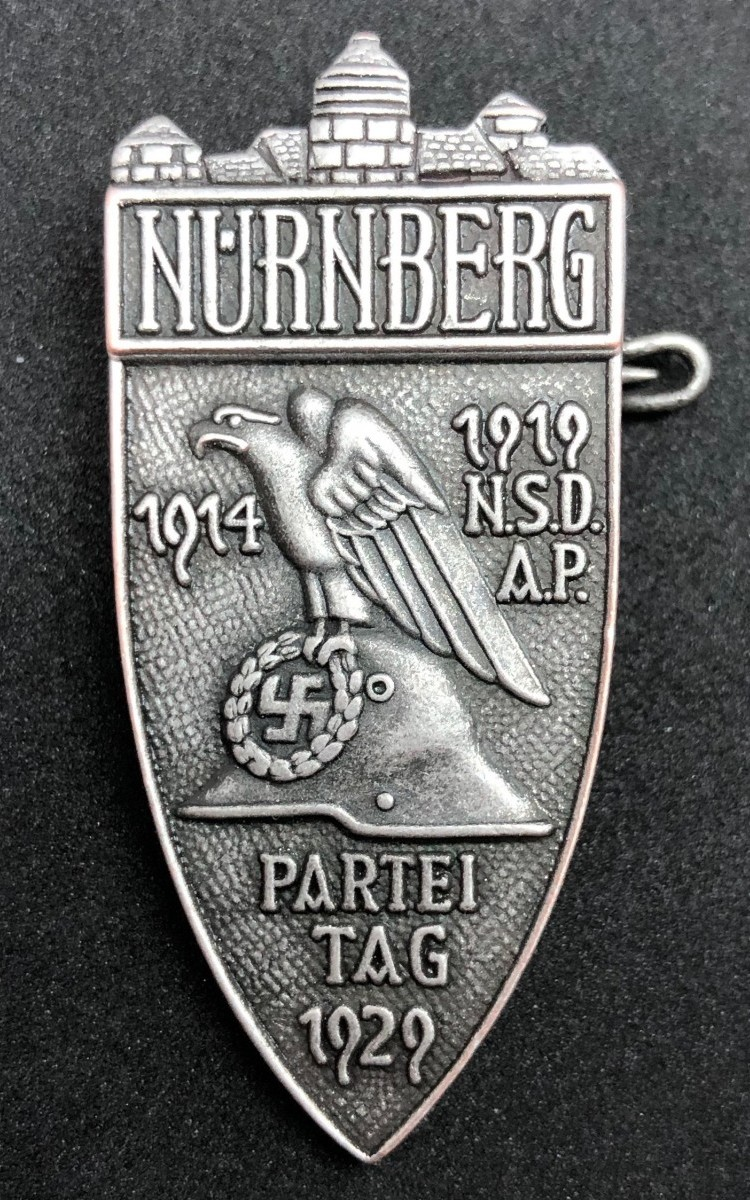
- Nuremberg Party Badge of 1929
- Country: Nazi Germany
- Presented by: Nazi Party
- Eligibility: 4th National Party Day participants, 1–4 August 1929
- Motto: 1914-1919; N.S.D.A.P. Partei Tag 1929
- Status: Obsolete, illegal
- Established: 15 August 1929

Precedence
- Next (higher): Coburg Badge
- Next (lower): Brunswick Rally Badge

The Nuremberg Party Day Badge (German: Das Nürnberger Parteiabzeichen von 1929) was the second badge recognised as a national award of the Nazi Party (NSDAP). Also known as the Nuremberg Party Badge of 1929, it was awarded to those Nazi Party members who had attended the 1929 national rally in the city of Nuremberg. After the establishment of Nazi Germany, it formally was given precedence as the second highest Party award in a decree of 6 November 1936.

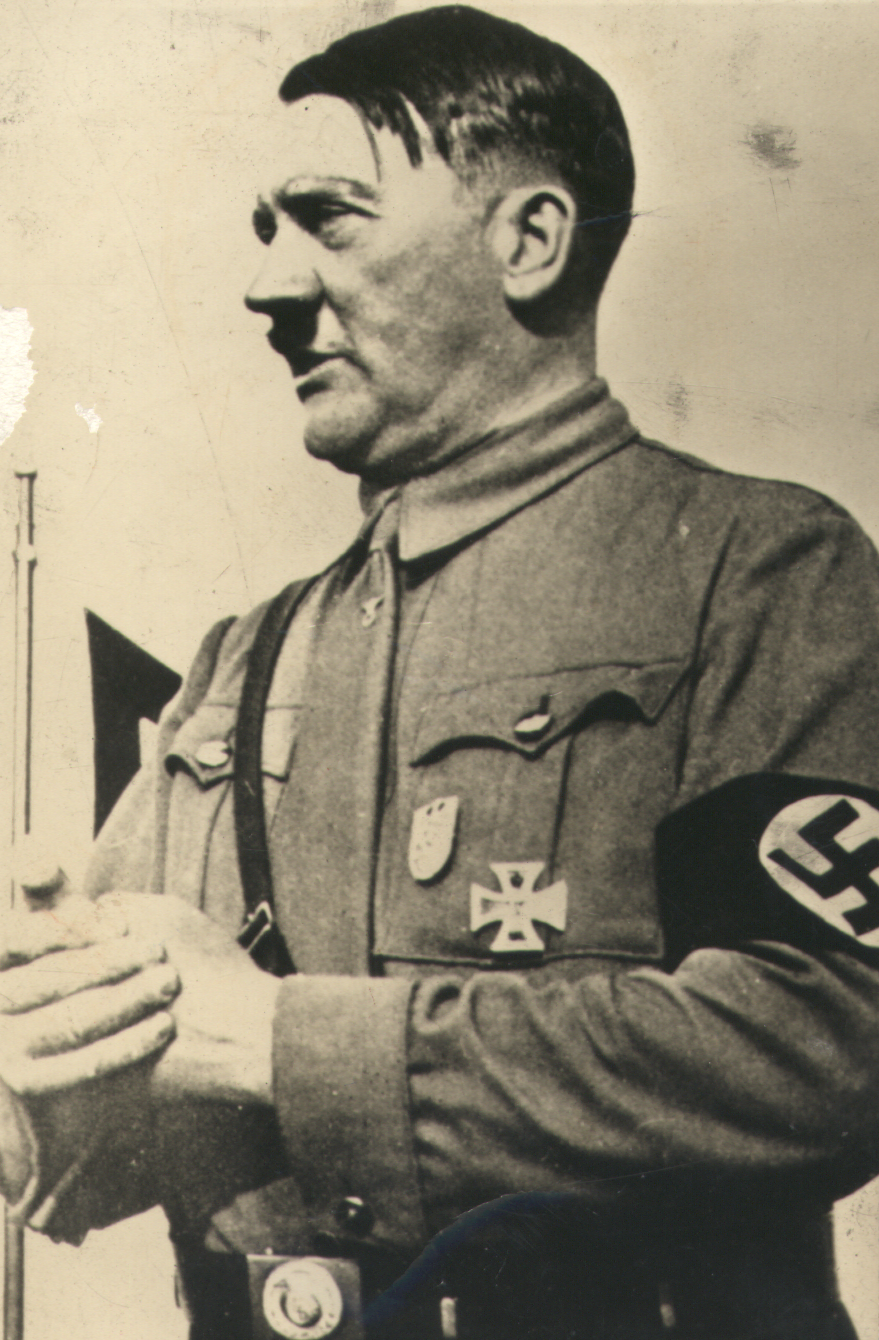
Hitler in his brownshirt SA uniform wearing the Nuremberg Party Day Badge and his World War I Iron Cross

== The rally ==
The Nazi Party held its 4th Reichsparteitage der NSDAP (National Party Day) in Nuremberg on 1–4 August 1929. It was the first rally held since August 1927. Thirty-five special trains brought an estimated 25,000 SA and SS personnel and 1,300 Hitler Youth participants from all over Germany. The police estimated the attendance at between 30,000 and 40,000. It was a far larger and more elaborate production than the previous rally, and Adolf Hitler intended to use it to showcase the growth of his movement, which now topped 130,000 members.

== The badge ==
To commemorate the rally, a special honour badge was established on 15 August 1929 by the commander of the SA. All Nazi Party members who had attended the rally were eligible to wear the badge. Permission to wear the Nuremberg Party Badge was granted by the Gauleiter (Senior district leader). The wearing of the badge could be withdrawn by Hitler and the chief of the Nazi Party Chancellery, Martin Bormann.

The badge measured 21mm wide by 48mm high. It displayed a representation of the Nuremberg Castle at the top with the word "Nürnberg" under it. An eagle clutching a wreath encircling a swastika stood on top of a helmet in the center, with the inscriptions "1914-1919" and "N.S.D.A.P. Partei Tag 1929" around it. The badge was produced in gray, silver and gold, with no significance attributed to the color.

== Precedence ==
After the founding of Nazi Germany, the Nuremberg Party Day Badge was viewed as a symbol of membership in the "Old Guard" (Alter Kämpfer) and was frequently displayed by high-ranking leaders, including Hitler (who normally did not wear an excess of NSDAP awards) at subsequent Nuremberg rallies. The badge was to be worn on the left breast side of a uniform.

In a decree signed 6 November 1936, Hitler gave new orders of precedence for the "Orders and Awards" of Nazi Germany. The top NSDAP awards were listed in this order: 1. Coburg Badge; 2. Nuremberg Party Badge of 1929; 3. Brunswick Rally Badge of 1931; 4. Golden Party Badge; 5. The Blood Order; followed by the individual Gau badges and the Golden Hitler Youth Badge.

== Selected recipients ==
- Adolf-Heinz Beckerle
- Joseph Berchtold
- Heinrich Böhmcker
- Philipp Bouhler
- Walter Buch
- Leonardo Conti
- Kurt Daluege
- Karl von Eberstein
- Karl Fiehler
- Heinrich-Georg Graf Finck von Finckenstein
- Albert Forster
- Hans Frank
- Joseph Goebbels
- Hermann Göring
- Paul Hennicke
- Arthur Hess
- Rudolf Hess
- Friedrich Hildebrandt
- Heinrich Himmler
- Adolf Hitler
- Otto Hofmann
- Dietrich von Jagow
- Fritz Katzmann
- Wilhelm Kube
- Hinrich Lohse
- Viktor Lutze
- Joachim Meyer-Quade
- Wilhelm Murr
- Martin Mutschmann
- Franz Pfeffer von Salomon
- Bernhard Rust
- Fritz Sauckel
- Wilhelm Schepmann
- Baldur von Schirach
- Fritz Schlessmann
- Erich Schmiedicke
- Heinrich Schoene
- Gregor Strasser
- Julius Streicher
- Fritz Wachtler
- Otto Wagener
- Karl Wahl

== See also ==
- Political decorations of the Nazi Party

== Sources ==
- Angolia, John (1989). For Führer and Fatherland: Political & Civil Awards of the Third Reich. R. James Bender Publishing. ISBN 0912138165.
- Campbell, Bruce (1998). The SA Generals and the Rise of Nazism. Lexington: University Press of Kentucky. ISBN 978-0-813-12047-8.
- Doehle, Heinrich (1995) [1943]. Medals & Decorations of the Third Reich: Badges, Decorations, Insignia. Reddick Enterprises. ISBN 0962488348.
- Dombrowski, Hanns (1940). Orders, Ehrenzeichen und Titel.
- Kershaw, Ian (2008). Hitler: A Biography. W.W. Norton & Co. ISBN 978-0-393-33761-7.
- Miller, Michael D.; Schulz, Andreas (2012). Gauleiter: The Regional Leaders of the Nazi Party and Their Deputies, 1925–1945. Vol. 1 (Herbert Albrecht – H. Wilhelm Hüttmann). R. James Bender Publishing. ISBN 978-1-932-97021-0.
- Miller, Michael D.; Schulz, Andreas (2017). Gauleiter: The Regional Leaders of the Nazi Party and Their Deputies, 1925–1945. Vol. 2 (Georg Joel – Dr. Bernhard Rust). R. James Bender Publishing. ISBN 978-1-932-97032-6.
- Miller, Michael D.; Schulz, Andreas (2021). Gauleiter: The Regional Leaders of the Nazi Party and Their Deputies, 1925–1945. Vol. 3 (Fritz Sauckel –- Hans Zimmermann). Fonthill Media. ISBN 978-1-781-55826-3.
- Miller, Michael D.; Schulz, Andreas (2015). Leaders of the Storm Troops. Vol. 1. Solihull, England: Helion & Company. ISBN 978-1-909-98287-1.
- Miller, Michael D. (2006). Leaders of the SS & German Police. Vol. 1 Reichsführer SS – Gruppenführer (Georg Ahrens to Karl Gutenberger). R. James Bender Publishing. ISBN 978-9-329-70037-2.
- Miller, Michael D. (2015). Leaders of the SS & German Police. Vol. 2 Reichsführer SS – Gruppenführer (Hans Haltermann to Walter Kruger). R. James Bender Publishing. ISBN 978-1-932-97025-8.
- Zentner, Christian; Bedürftig, Friedemann, eds. (1997) [1991]. The Encyclopedia of the Third Reich. New York: Da Capo Press. ISBN 978-0-306-80793-0.
