= Günther Gräntz =

German Nazi SA general (1905–1945)

Volkssturm Chief of Staff Gau Berlin
- In office 18 October 1944 – 30 April 1945
- Preceded by: Position created
- Succeeded by: Position abolished

Führer, SA-Gruppe Berlin-Brandenburg
- In office 1 January 1944 – 30 April 1945

Führer, SA-Gruppe Niedersachsen
- In office 1 February 1942 – 31 December 1943

Führer, SA-Gruppe Westmark
- In office 1 October 1936 – 31 January 1942

Political positions
- 1938–1945: Reichstag Deputy
- 1934: Frankfurt City Council
- 1933: Landtag of Prussia
- 1933: Hesse-Nassau Provincial Council
- 1933: Wiesbaden Municipal Council

Personal details
- Born: 26 July 1905 Frankfurt am Main, Province of Hesse-Nassau, Kingdom of Prussia, German Empire
- Died: 30 April 1945 (aged 39) Berlin, Nazi Germany
- Cause of death: Killed in action
- Party: Nazi Party
- Other political affiliations: German Völkisch Freedom Party; Greater German People's Community; National Socialist Freedom Movement
- Education: Universität Frankfurt am Main; Ludwig-Maximilians-Universität München
- Occupation: Paramilitary officer
- Civilian awards: Brunswick Rally Badge; Golden Party Badge

Military service
- Allegiance: Nazi Germany
- Branch/service: German Army
- Years of service: 1939–1944
- Rank: Major
- Unit: Infantry Regiment 468
- Battles/wars: World War II; Battle of France; Eastern Front; Battle of Berlin
- Military awards: German Cross in Gold; Iron Cross, 1st and 2nd class Wound Badge

Günther Gräntz (26 July 1905 – 30 April 1945) was a member of the Nazi Party and its paramilitary unit, the Sturmabteilung (SA). He held several important staff and field commands and rose to the rank of SA-Obergruppenführer. During the Second World War, he also served in the German Army and in the Volkssturm, the Nazi Party militia. He was killed in action during the Battle of Berlin in the closing days of the war in Europe.

== Early life and education ==
Gräntz was born in Frankfurt am Main, the son of a senior schoolteacher. He attended the local Mittelschule and Realgymnasium, passing his Reifeprüfung (matriculation examination) in 1923. He completed a two-year commercial apprenticeship and then began studying economics and law at the Universität Frankfurt am Main until 1927 and then at the Ludwig-Maximilians-Universität München until 1930 when he dropped out and obtained employment as a commercial clerk.

== Political activity ==
While still a student in Frankfurt in 1922, Gräntz joined the Jugendbund, a forerunner of the Hitler Youth. Between 1923 and 1924, he joined a number of right-wing political organizations, many of which were front organizations for the Nazi Party that had been banned after Adolf Hitler's failed Beer Hall Putsch. Among these were the German Völkisch Freedom Party, the Greater German People's Community and the National Socialist Freedom Movement. On 2 June 1925, Gräntz finally joined the Nazi Party (membership number 5,274) at its Ortsgruppe (local group) in Frankfurt, once the ban on it was lifted. As an early Party member, he later would be awarded the Golden Party Badge. From 1926 to 1930, he was a member of the National Socialist German Students' League.

Following the Nazi seizure of power in 1933, Gräntz received a mandate to the Landtag of Prussia on 5 March 1933, which he held until that body was dissolved on 14 October 1933. During the same period, he was also appointed to the municipal parliament in Wiesbaden and to the provincial parliament of the Province of Hesse-Nassau in Kassel. Although he sought a seat in the Reichstag at the November 1933 parliamentary election, he was unsuccessful. Between February and April 1934, he obtained a seat on the Frankfurt City Council. Gräntz again tried for a seat in the national parliament on 29 March 1936, but again failed to win a seat. However, on 10 April 1938, he was elected as a deputy to the Reichstag from electoral constituency 21 (Koblenz-Trier), and he retained this seat until his death.

== Career in the Sturmabteilung ==
Gräntz was an early member of the Nazi Party's paramilitary unit, the Sturmabteilung (SA), joining it in November 1922 when he was still in school. During the period when the SA was banned by the authorities, he joined its front organization, the Frontbann, which was organized by Ernst Röhm. Once the ban was lifted, he rejoined the SA in February 1925 in Frankfurt where he worked as an SA clerk, treasurer and adjutant for he next two years. While a student in Munich, he transferred to the SA-Sturm I in that city in April 1927. In May 1928, he was named the adjutant of SA-Standarte II in Frankfurt and remained in that post through April 1931. Gräntz next was given his own command as SA-Führer of Sturmbann (battalion) I of SA-Standarte 81, while also serving as the regimental adjutant through December of that year. While in this post, he participated in the SA mass rally at Braunschweig, for which he would be awarded the Brunswick Rally Badge. From January to April 1932, Gräntz commanded Sturmbann IV of SA-Standarte 88. In July 1932, he was named adjutant to SA-Untergruppe Hessen-Nassau and, in December 1932, he was made a full-time SA-Führer.

After the Nazis took control of the national government in January 1933, Gräntz became the adjutant to the police president of Frankfurt from March to May 1933. From June to mid-August he was the leader of the SA leadership school in SA-Gruppe Hessen. On 15 August 1933, he became the Führer of SA-Brigade 49 in Frankfurt and, the next month, also was named the Chief of Staff of SA-Gruppe Hessen. In February 1934, he also temporarily held the command of SA-Brigade 47 in Kassel. Leaving his Frankfurt field command in April 1934, Gräntz was assigned to the staff of the Supreme SA Leadership (OSAF) in Munich, where on 9 June he took over as a department chief in the SA Personnel Office where he remained through the end of November 1935. From 1 December 1935 to 30 September 1936, he was Führer of SA-Brigade 162 "Minden-Nienburg" in SA-Gruppe Sachsen. From 1 October 1936 to 31 January 1942, he was Führer of the SA-Gruppe Westmark (renamed SA-Gruppe Mittelrhein on 1 July 1941) in Koblenz. After being promoted to SA-Obergruppenführer on 30 January 1941, Gräntz was appointed as the Führer of SA-Gruppe Niedersachsen, with headquarters in Hanover from 1 February 1942 to 31 December 1943. His next assignment, from 1 January 1944 until his death, was as the Führer of SA-Gruppe Berlin-Brandenburg, headquartered in Berlin.

=== SA ranks ===
SA ranks
Date	Rank
May 1931	SA-Sturmbannführer
1 July 1932	SA-Standartenführer
15 November 1933	SA-Oberführer
9 November 1934	SA-Brigadeführer
1 May 1937	SA-Gruppenführer
30 January 1941	SA-Obergruppenführer

== War service and death ==
Gräntz performed military training exercises with Infantry Regiment 19 between February and May 1939. After the outbreak of the Second World War, he entered military service as an Leutnant of reserves with Infantry Regiment 468 and fought in the Battle of France in which he was wounded. He also fought as a platoon leader in a machine gun company on the eastern front. While Gräntz was in the army, his SA leadership duties were executed by his deputy. Between September 1943 and March 1944, he was granted a six-month leave to attend to his SA obligations. In May 1944, he was discharged from the army with the rank of Major, after having earned the German Cross in gold, the Iron Cross, 1st and 2nd class, and the Wound Badge.

In October 1944, Gräntz was named the Chief of Staff for Gau Berlin of the Volkssturm, the Nazi Party militia. In this role, he was the organizer of the local militia units and reported to Nazi Propaganda Minister Joseph Goebbels who, as Gauleiter and Reich Defense Commissioner of Berlin, was the local Volkssturm commander. During the fierce house-to-house fighting against the advancing Red Army in the Battle of Berlin in April 1945, Gräntz was killed in action in Berlin's Zehlendorf district on 30 April 1945.

== Sources ==
- Günther Gräntz entry in the Hessian Regional History Information System (LAGIS)
- Günther Gräntz entry in the Rheinland-Pfälzische Personendatenbank
- Information about Günther Gräntz in the Reichstag database
- Miller, Michael D.; Schulz, Andreas (2012). Gauleiter: The Regional Leaders of the Nazi Party and Their Deputies, 1925–1945. Vol. 1 (Herbert Albrecht – H. Wilhelm Hüttmann). R. James Bender Publishing. ISBN 978-1-932-97021-0.
- Miller, Michael D.; Schulz, Andreas (2015). Leaders of the Storm Troops. Vol. 1. Solihull, England: Helion & Company. ISBN 978-1-909-98287-1.
- Stockhorst, Erich (1985). 5000 Köpfe: Wer War Was im 3. Reich. Arndt. p. 161. ISBN 978-3-887-41116-9.
