= Heinrich-Georg Graf Finck von Finckenstein =

German SA general and Nazi politician (1894–1984)

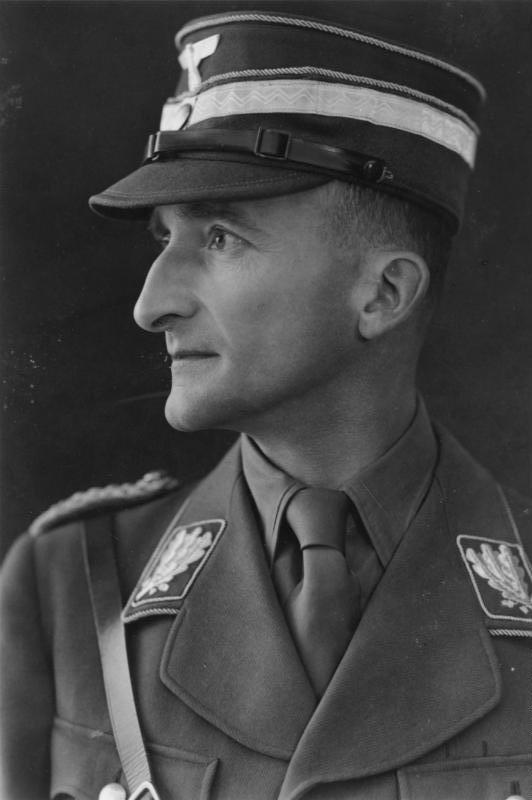
- SA-Gruppenführer Finckenstein, c. 1937 – 1939

Supreme SA Leadership (OSAF) Staff
- In office 15 June 1939 – 8 May 1945

Führer, SA-Gruppe Schlesien
- In office 15 August 1936 – 14 June 1939
- Preceded by: Otto Herzog

Führer, SA-Brigade 21
- In office 20 April 1935 – 14 August 1936

Führer, SA-Standarte 50
- In office 1 July 1932 – 19 April 1935

Additional positions
- 1942–1945: Judge, People's Court
- 1938–1945: Reichstag Deputy
- 1937–1945: Prussian Provincial Councilor

Personal details
- Born: Heinrich-Georg Wilhelm Werner Graf Finck von Finckenstein; 22 November 1894 Eisersdorf, Province of Silesia, Kingdom of Prussia, German Empire
- Died: 19 February 1984 (aged 89) Bielefeld, North Rhine-Westphalia, West Germany
- Party: Nazi Party
- Occupation: Farmer
- Civilian awards: Golden Party Badge; Brunswick Rally Badge; Nuremberg Party Day Badge

Military service
- Allegiance: German Empire; Nazi Germany
- Branch/service: Imperial German Army; Freikorps; German Army
- Years of service: 1914–1922; 1939–1945
- Rank: Oberleutnant; Major
- Unit: 4th (1st Silesian) Dragoon Regiment; Fusilier Regiment 68; Landesschützen Reserve Battalion 4
- Battles/wars: World War I Kapp Putsch; Silesian Uprisings; World War II
- Military awards: Iron Cross, 1st and 2nd class

Heinrich-Georg Graf Finck von Finckenstein (22 November 1894 – 19 February 1984) was a member of an old German noble family who served in the Imperial German Army during the First World War. After the war ended, he belonged to several right-wing paramilitary groups, and fought in the Kapp Putsch, the Silesian Uprisings and against the French occupation of the Ruhr. He then became a member of the Nazi Party and its paramilitary unit, the Sturmabteilung (SA), rising to the rank of SA-Obergruppenführer. He was also a politician, and sat as a Reichstag deputy from 1938 to 1945.

== Early life and military service ==
Finckenstein was born at Eisersdorf (today, Żelazno) in the Province of Silesia. He was the scion of a Prussian noble family, the son of the large landowner Heinrich Graf Finck von Finckenstein (1855–1939) and his second wife Sophie Freiin von Münchhausen (1858–1920). He attended Volksschule and a humanistic Gymnasium in Greifenberg, receiving his Abitur. Upon the outbreak of the First World War, he joined the Imperial German Army on 1 August 1914 as a Fahnenjunker (military cadet) with the 4th (1st Silesian) Dragoon Regiment "von Bredow" in Lüben (today, Lubin). Deployed to the front lines in November 1914, he was commissioned a Leutnant in February 1915 and served as a platoon leader. In May 1917, he became the commander of a signals detachment in the 5th Reserve Infantry Division. He earned the Iron Cross, 1st and 2nd class, before the end of hostilities in November 1918.

From 1919 to 1922 Finckenstein was a member of various Freikorps units, including the Freiwillige Sturmabteilung Schlichtingsheim and the Marinebrigade von Loewenfeld. He participated in the street fighting in Kiel in March 1920, during the Kapp Putsch that sought to overthrow the Weimar Republic. The following September, he saw service in Westphalia with the Organisation Escherich, a paramilitary unit led by Georg Escherich. From May through autumn 1921, Finckenstein was a company commander in a battalion led by Albert Leo Schlageter. During this time, he took part in the suppression of the Third Silesian Uprising in Upper Silesia, and in fighting against the French occupation forces in the Ruhr. In 1922 he retired from the military with the rank of Oberleutnant. From 1923 to 1933, Finckenstein earned his living as a farmer.

== Career in the Sturmabteilung (SA) ==
On 28 July 1929, Finckenstein became a member of the Sturmabteilung (SA), the Nazi Party paramilitary organization. By March 1930, he was the Führer of an SA-Sturm in Guhrau (today, Góra) and, in March 1931, advanced to the leadership of a Sturmbann (battalion) there. On 18 October 1931, he participated in the large SA rally in Braunschweig, earning the Brunswick Rally Badge. On 1 July 1932, he was made SA-Führer of SA-Standarte 50 in Herrnstadt (today, Wąsosz). Finckenstein's next advancement was to the command of SA-Brigade 21, headquartered in Liegnitz (today, Legnica) on 20 April 1935. On 15 August 1936, he took over as Führer of SA-Gruppe Schlesien, commanding all SA personnel in the large province of Silesia. On 20 June 1939, Finckenstein left his field command for a staff assignment with the Supreme SA Leadership (OSAF) in Munich, and he was promoted to SA-Obergruppenführer on 30 January 1941.

=== SA ranks ===
SA ranks
Date	Rank
21 May 1930	SA-Sturmführer
14 June 1931	SA-Sturmbannführer
1 July 1932	SA-Standartenführer
20 April 1934	SA-Oberführer
20 April 1935	SA-Brigadeführer
1 May 1937	SA-Gruppenführer
30 January 1941	SA-Obergruppenführer

== Political activity ==
Finckenstein was one of the earliest aristocrats to join the Nazi movement. He first joined the Nazi Party in June 1923, and rejoined it on 25 September 1925 (membership number 19,599) after it was refounded following the ban imposed after Adolf Hitler's unsuccessful Beer Hall Putsch. As an Alter Kampfer (old fighter), he would later be awarded the Golden Party Badge. He attended the Nuremberg Party Rally of 1929, for which he was awarded the Nuremberg Party Day Badge. After the Nazi seizure of power, he became a member of the Kreisrat (county council) of Guhrau. In the March 1936 Reichstag election, Finckenstein was unsuccessful in his electoral bid. However, he was elected as a Reichstag deputy for electoral constituency 8 (Liegnitz) at the April 1938 election, and retained this seat until the fall of the Nazi regime in May 1945. Between 1937 and June 1939, Finckenstein also sat as a member of the Provincial Council of the Province of Lower Silesia (from April 1938, the Province of Silesia). In March 1942, he received a five-year appointment as a lay judge at the People's Court.

Shortly after the outbreak of the Second World War, Finckenstein joined the German Army on 11 September 1939. He was assigned to Fusilier Regiment 68 and, in 1943, he was made a Major in the Landesschützen (State Riflemen) Reserve Battalion 4 in Glauchau. Little is documented about Finckenstein's post-war life. He lived near Bielefeld where he died in February 1984.

== Sources ==
- Campbell, Bruce (1998). The SA Generals and the Rise of Nazism. Lexington: University Press of Kentucky. ISBN 978-0-813-12047-8.
- Information about Heinrich-Georg Graf Finck von Finckenstein in the Reichstag database
- Lilla, Joachim; Döring, Martin; Schulz, Andreas (2004) Statisten in Uniform: Die Mitglieder des Reichstags 1933–1945. Ein biographisches Handbuch. Unter Einbeziehung der völkischen und nationalsozialistischen Reichstagsabgeordneten ab Mai 1924. Düsseldorf: Droste Verlag. p. 140. ISBN 3-7700-5254-4.
- Malinowski, Stephan (2021). Nazis and Nobles: The History of a Misalliance. Oxford University Press. ISBN 978-0-198-84255-2.
- Miller, Michael D.; Schulz, Andreas (2015). Leaders of the Storm Troops. Vol. 1. Solihull, England: Helion & Company. ISBN 978-1-909-98287-1.
- Stockhorst, Erich (1985). 5000 Köpfe: Wer War Was im 3. Reich. Arndt. p. 134. ISBN 978-3-887-41116-9
