= Josef Terboven =

German Nazi politician (1898–1945)

- Terboven in 1942

Reichskommissar for the Occupied Norwegian Territories
- In office 24 April 1940 – 7 May 1945
- Appointed by: Adolf Hitler
- Preceded by: Position created
- Succeeded by: Franz Böhme (acting)

Gauleiter of Gau Essen
- In office 1 August 1930 – 8 May 1945
- Appointed by: Adolf Hitler
- Preceded by: Position created
- Succeeded by: Position abolished

Oberpräsident of Rhine Province
- In office 5 February 1935 – 8 May 1945
- Preceded by: Hermann von Lüninck
- Succeeded by: Position abolished

Additional positions
- 1930–1945: Reichstag Deputy
- 1930–1933: Provincial Landtag Deputy
- 1930–1933: Essen City Councilor

Personal details
- Born: Josef Antonius Heinrich Terboven; 23 May 1898 Essen, Rhine Province, Kingdom of Prussia, German Empire
- Died: 8 May 1945 (aged 46) Asker, Akershus, Norway
- Cause of death: Suicide
- Party: Nazi Party (NSDAP)
- Education: Ludwig-Maximilians-Universität München; University of Freiburg
- Profession: Bank clerk
- Civilian awards: Golden Party Badge

Military service
- Allegiance: German Empire
- Branch/service: Imperial German Army
- Years of service: 1915–1918
- Rank: Leutnant
- Unit: Feldartillerie Regiment 9 Luftstreitkräfte
- Battles/wars: World War I
- Military awards: Iron Cross, 1st and 2nd class

Josef Antonius Heinrich Terboven (23 May 1898 – 8 May 1945) was a German Nazi Party official and politician who was the long-serving Gauleiter of Gau Essen and the Reichskommissar for Norway during the German occupation.

Terboven was born in Essen, Germany, and attended Volksschule and Realschule before he volunteered for military service during the First World War. After the war, he studied law and political science at the Ludwig-Maximilians-Universität München and the University of Freiburg, where he first got involved in politics. Terboven joined the Nazi Party in 1923, participated in the Beer Hall Putsch and eventually rose through the ranks to become the Gauleiter of Essen and the editor of various Nazi newspapers. After the Nazi seizure of power in 1933, Terboven was promoted to SA-Gruppenführer and was made a member of the Prussian State Council.

In 1940, he was appointed Reichskommissar for Norway, a position that granted him significant power and control. Terboven established multiple concentration camps in Norway, ruthlessly persecuted the Jewish population and focused on crushing the Norwegian resistance movement. His actions led to numerous atrocities, such as the Beisfjord massacre in which hundreds of Yugoslavian political prisoners and prisoners-of-war were murdered.

As the tide of the war turned against Germany, Terboven implemented a scorched earth policy in northern Norway that resulted in the forced evacuation of 50,000 Norwegians and widespread destruction. He hoped to turn Norway into a fortress for the Nazi regime's last stand. However, after Adolf Hitler's suicide, his successor, Großadmiral Karl Dönitz, dismissed Terboven from his post as Reichskommissar on 7 May 1945.

On 8 May 1945, the day of Germany's surrender, Terboven committed suicide by detonating 50 kg (110 lbs) of dynamite in a bunker on the Skaugum compound in Norway. His family survived in West Germany, and his wife, Ilse (Stahl) Terboven died in 1972.

== Early life ==
Terboven was born in Essen, the son of minor landed gentry of Dutch descent. The family name comes from the Low German daar boven ("up there"), referring to a farmstead on a hill. Josef Terboven attended Volksschule and Realschule in Essen until 1915 and then volunteered for military service in the First World War. He served with Feldartillerie Regiment 9 and then with the nascent air force. He was awarded the Iron Cross, 1st and 2nd class, and attained the rank of Leutnant before being discharged on 22 December 1918. He studied law and political science at the Ludwig-Maximilians-Universität München and the University of Freiburg, where he first got involved in politics. He dropped out of the university in 1922 without earning a degree and trained as a bank official in Essen, working as a bank clerk through June 1925.

== Nazi Party career ==
Terboven joined the Nazi Party in November 1923 with membership number 25,247 and participated in the abortive Beer Hall Putsch in Munich. As an early Party member, he later would be awarded the Golden Party Badge. When the Party subsequently was outlawed, he continued to work at the bank until after the ban was lifted in February 1925. In August 1925 Terboven went to work full-time for the Party, becoming the head of a small Nazi newspaper and book distributorship in Essen. At this time he also founded the Ortsgruppe (Local Group) in Essen, becoming its first Ortsgruppenleiter. He also joined the Sturmabteilung (SA) becoming the SA-Führer in Essen. He formally re-enrolled in the Party on 15 December 1925. By 1927, he had advanced to Bezirksleiter (District Leader) of the Essen district in the Großgau Ruhr. From 1927 to December 1930, Terboven was the editor of the weekly Nazi newspaper The New Front: The Weekly Sheet of the Working People. In 1929, he was sentenced to three months imprisonment for continuing to publish the proscribed paper. In the 20 May 1928 election, Terboven failed in his attempt to be elected to the Prussian Landtag.

On 1 October 1928 upon the dissolution of the Großgau Ruhr, the Essen district became an independent unit subordinated to the central Party headquarters in Munich. However, on 1 August 1930 the Essen district officially was raised to Gau status and Terboven was named Gauleiter. He would retain this post throughout the Nazi regime.

In 1930, Terboven also became a City Councilor in Essen and a member of the Provincial Landtag of the Rhine Province until it was dissolved in 1933. On 14 September 1930, Terboven was elected to the Reichstag from electoral constituency 23, Düsseldorf West and would continue to hold this seat until the end of the Nazi regime. From 15 December 1930, Terboven was also the editor of the National-Zeiting in Essen.

After the Nazi seizure of power, Terboven was promoted to SA-Gruppenführer on 1 March 1933 and made a member of the Prussian State Council on 10 July 1933. On 28 June 1934, Terboven married Ilse Stahl, Joseph Goebbels's former secretary and mistress. Adolf Hitler was a witness at the wedding, and while in Essen put into play preparations for the Night of the Long Knives. On 5 February 1935, Terboven was appointed Oberpräsident (High President) of Prussia's Rhine Province which included Gau Essen and three other Gaue. He thus united under his control the highest party and governmental offices within his jurisdiction. On 27 April 1935 Terboven received the Golden Party Badge. He was promoted to the rank of SA-Obergruppenführer on 9 November 1936. On the outbreak of war on 1 September 1939, he was named Reich Defense Commissioner for Wehrkreis (Military District) VI, which included his Gau together with Gau Dusseldorf, Gau Cologne-Aachen, most of Gau Westphalia-North and Gau Westphalia-South and part of Gau Weser-Ems. On 16 November 1942, the jurisdiction of the Reich Defense Commissioners was changed from the Wehrkreis to the Gau level and Terboven remained Commissioner for only his Gau of Essen.

== Reichskommissar of Norway ==
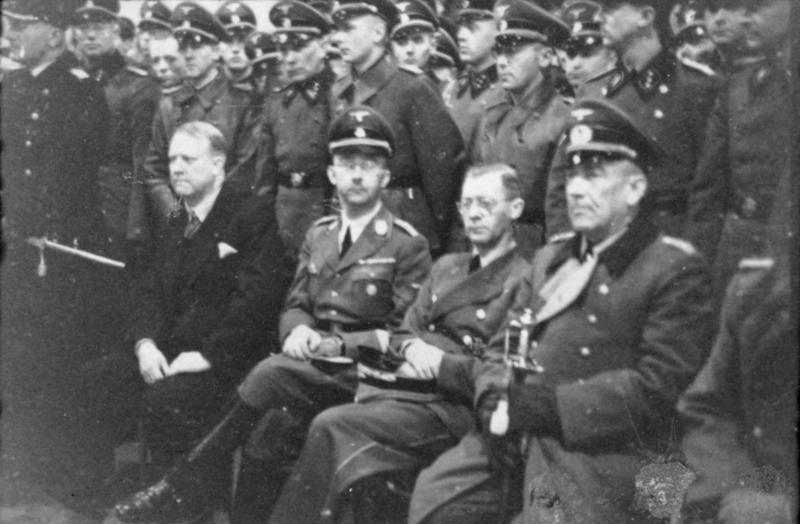
Terboven (seated second from right) with Vidkun Quisling (left), Heinrich Himmler (second from left), and Nikolaus von Falkenhorst (right).

Terboven was named Reichskommissar for Norway on 24 April 1940 even before the military invasion's completion on 10 June. He moved into Skaugum, the official residence of Crown Prince Olav, in September 1940 and made his headquarters in the Norwegian Parliament building. Nothing in Terboven's background and training particularly qualified him for that post, but he had Hitler's full confidence. He was responsible to no one but Hitler, and within the Nazi governmental hierarchy, his office stood on the same level as the Reich Ministries. Terboven regarded himself as virtually an autonomous viceroy with what he termed "limitless power of command". His conception of his role resulted in his attempting to ignore any directives not issued by Hitler himself.

Reichskommissar Terboven had supervisory authority over only the German civilian administration, which was very small and did not rule Norway directly. Day-to-day governmental affairs were managed by the existing seven-member Norwegian Administrative Council, which had been set up by the Norwegian Supreme Court after the king and cabinet fled into exile. On 25 September 1940, Terboven dismissed the Administrative Council and appointed a thirteen-member Provisional State Council to administer affairs. All the members were Terboven's hand-picked appointees and worked under his control and supervision. A proclamation was issued deposing King Haakon VII, outlawing the government-in-exile, disbanding the Storting and banning all political parties except Vidkun Quisling's Nasjonal Samling. Terboven therefore remained in ultimate charge of Norway until the end of the war in 1945, even after he had permitted the formation of a Norwegian puppet regime on 1 February 1942 under Quisling as minister-president, the so-called Quisling government.

Terboven also did not have authority over the 400,000 regular German Army forces that were stationed in Norway which were under the command of Generaloberst Nikolaus von Falkenhorst, but he commanded a personal force of around 6,000 men of whom 800 were part of the secret police. In contrast to the military forces commanded by Falkenhorst, which aimed to reach an understanding with the Norwegian people and were under orders by Falkenhorst to treat Norwegians with courtesy, Terboven behaved in a petty and ruthless way and was widely disliked not only by the Norwegians but also by many Germans. Joseph Goebbels, the Reich Minister of Propaganda, expressed annoyance in his diaries about what he called Terboven's "bullying tactics" against the Norwegians, as they alienated the population against the Germans. Terboven's relations with the army commander were strained, but his relations with the Higher SS and Police Leader, Wilhelm Rediess, were very good, and he co-operated in providing Rediess's staff a free hand with their policies of repression.

=== Repression and crimes against humanity ===
Terboven established multiple concentration camps in Norway, including Falstad concentration camp near Levanger and Bredtvet concentration camp in Oslo in late 1941. At one of those camps on 18 July 1942 the Beisfjord massacre took place, the murder of hundreds of Yugoslavian political prisoners and prisoners-of-war by German and Norwegian concentration camp guards. Some 288 prisoners were shot to death, and many others were burned to death when the barracks were set on fire. Terboven had ordered the massacre a few days earlier. In July 1942, at least one German guard assigned to the Korgen prison camp was killed. The commandant ordered retribution: execution by gunfire for "39 prisoners at Korgen and 20 at Osen". In the days that followed, Terboven also ordered retribution, and around 400 prisoners were shot and killed in various camps.

From 1941, Terboven increasingly focused on crushing the Norwegian resistance movement, which engaged in acts of sabotage and assassination against the Germans. On 17 September, Terboven decreed that special SS and Police Tribunals would have jurisdiction over Norwegian citizens who violated his decrees. They were summary proceedings with the accused provided no adequate defense. The trials were not open to the public, and the proceedings were not published. Sentences were carried out shortly after they were pronounced with no right of appeal. It is estimated that some 150 individuals were sentenced to death by these tribunals. Many more were sentenced to long terms of hard labour.

On 26 April 1942, the Nazis learned that two members of the resistance were being sheltered by the inhabitants of Telavåg, a small fishing village. When the Gestapo arrived, shots were exchanged, and two Gestapo agents were killed. Terboven was outraged and personally led a reprisal raid on 30 April that was quick and brutal. All buildings were burned to the ground, all boats were sunk or confiscated and all livestock taken away. All men in the village were either executed or sent to the Sachsenhausen concentration camp, in Germany. Of the 72 who were deported from Telavåg, 31 were murdered in captivity. The women and the children were imprisoned for two years. Another 18 Norwegian prisoners unrelated to Telavåg, who were held at the Trandum internment camp, were also executed as reprisals. In another incident, the shooting of two German police officials on 6 September 1942 led to Terboven personally declaring martial law in Trondheim from 5 to 12 October 1942. He imposed a curfew from 8:00 p.m. to 5:00 a.m. and suppressed all newspapers, public assemblies and railroad transportation. On Terboven's orders, ten prominent citizens were executed in reprisal, and their assets were confiscated. In addition, Terboven set up an ad hoc extrajudicial tribunal to try Norwegians considered "hostile to the state". An additional 24 men were tried and summarily executed over the next three days.

Despite the small number of Jews in Norway's population (around 1,800), Terboven persecuted them relentlessly. Some 930 managed to escape to neighboring Sweden, but some 770 were rounded up and deported to Germany. The main deportation occurred on 26 November 1942, when 532 Jews were shipped to Stettin aboard the SS Donau. From there, they were transported to the Auschwitz concentration camp, and only 9 survived the war. On 25 February 1943, another 158 were similarly deported aboard the MS Gotenland, and only six survived.

== Last months of the war and death ==
On 25 September 1944, Terboven, in his capacity as Gauleiter of Essen, was named commander of the Volkssturm units in the Gau. In reality, it was his Deputy Gauleiter, Fritz Schlessmann, who executed those duties as he had been Acting Gauleiter in Essen during Terboven's absence in Norway since 1940. In October 1944, in response to the Red Army advance in to the Finnmark region of northern Norway, Terboven instituted a scorched earth policy that resulted in the forced evacuation of 50,000 Norwegians and widespread destruction, including the burning of 10,000 homes, 4,700 farms and hundreds of schools, churches, shops and industrial buildings.

As the tide of the war turned against Germany, Terboven wanted to organise Festung Norwegen (Fortress Norway) for the Nazi regime's last stand. After Hitler's suicide, his successor, Großadmiral Karl Dönitz, summoned Terboven to his headquarters in Flensburg on 3 May 1945 and ordered him to cooperate with winding down hostilities. Terboven expressed his desire to continue fighting and Dönitz dismissed Terboven from his post as Reichskommissar on 7 May and transferred his powers to General der Gebirgstruppe Franz Böhme.

With the announcement of the German surrender, Terboven committed suicide on 8 May 1945 by detonating 50 kg (110 lb) of dynamite in a bunker on the Skaugum compound. He died alongside the body of SS-Obergruppenführer Rediess, who had shot himself earlier. Terboven's family survived in West Germany, although his daughter, Inga, in an event in 1964 unrelated to her father's history, killed her two-year-old daughter by strangulation. Terboven's wife, Ilse, died in 1972.

== Sources ==
- Biography from Deutsches Historisches Museum
- Biography from Historisches Centrum Hagen
- Höffkes, Karl (1986). Hitlers Politische Generale. Die Gauleiter des Dritten Reiches: ein biographisches Nachschlagewerk. Tübingen: Grabert-Verlag. ISBN 3-87847-163-7.
- Miller, Michael D.; Schulz, Andreas (2021). Gauleiter: The Regional Leaders of the Nazi Party and Their Deputies, 1925–1945 (Fritz Sauckel – Hans Zimmermann). Vol. III. Fonthill Media. ISBN 978-1-781-55826-3.
- Orlow, Dietrich (1969). The History of the Nazi Party: 1919-1933. University of Pittsburgh Press. ISBN 0-8229-3183-4.
- Orlow, Dietrich (1973). The History of the Nazi Party: 1933-1945. University of Pittsburgh Press. ISBN 0-822-9-3253-9.
- WorldStatesmen- here Norway
