= German Order (distinction) =

German Nazi Party award

German Order Deutscher Orden
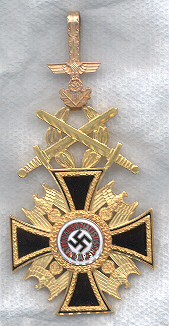

Awarded by Nazi Party
- Country: Nazi Germany
- Eligibility: Services to the state and party
- Status: Abolished
- Führer: Adolf Hitler
- Classes: 3

Statistics
- First induction: 11 February 1942
- Last induction: 28 April 1945
- Total inductees: 11
- Ribbon

The German Order (German: Deutscher Orden) was the highest award that the Nazi Party could bestow on an individual for services to the "state and party".

Adolf Hitler awarded the first such order posthumously to Reichsminister Fritz Todt during Todt's funeral in February 1942. A second posthumous award of the German Order was given to SS-Obergruppenführer Reinhard Heydrich at his funeral in June that year. Cynics called the award the "dead hero order" as it was almost always awarded posthumously. Of the eleven confirmed recipients, only two survived the war - Konstantin Hierl and Artur Axmann. Its production, public wearing, or distribution is prohibited in the Federal Republic.

== Concept and description ==
The award was designed by Benno von Arent. The concept of the order was based on the ceremonial regalia of the Grand Master of the Teutonic Order, the Marian Cross of the Teutonic Order, the Knight's Cross of the Iron Cross and the cross of the Knight of Justice of the Order of St. John (Bailiwick of Brandenburg).

The black enamel cross in the middle section of the award resembled that of the Iron Cross and the medal also had similarities in design to the Order of the German Eagle. It measured 48.5 mm across the arms of the cross. At the centre was a medallion, which measured 20.5 mm. In between the arms of the cross were national eagles with furled wings, each one of the four eagles with a wreath clutched in its claws. At the center of the medal is the Golden Party Badge.

There were three degrees:

- 1st degree (golden cross with laurel wreath and swords as neck medal)
- 2nd level (golden cross as neck medal)
- 3rd level (golden cross to pin on)

The sole manufacturer was the company Wilhelm Deumer in Lüdenscheid.

== Recipients ==
Only the 1st degree was ever awarded. This award is considered the second rarest award of Nazi Germany after the National Prize for Art and Science. The holders of this award were intended to form a collegiate order.

Adolf Hitler regarded this award as his personal decoration to be bestowed only upon those whose services to the state, party, and the people, he deemed worthy. For this reason, plus the fact that the reverse of the medal bears a facsimile of his signature, it was also informally known as the 'Hitler Order'.

There were eleven confirmed recipients of this award:

- Fritz Todt, 11 February 1942 (posthumous)
- Reinhard Heydrich, 9 June 1942 (posthumous), assassinated by partisans in Prague
- Adolf Hühnlein, 22 June 1942 (posthumous), died of cancer
- Viktor Lutze, 7 May 1943 (posthumous), car accident
- Adolf Wagner, 17 April 1944 (posthumous), died of stroke
- Josef Bürckel, 3 October 1944 (posthumous), pneumonia and blood failure
- Rudolf Schmundt, 7 October 1944 (posthumous), died of wounds received in the 20 July bombing (Operation Valkyrie)
- Konstantin Hierl, 24 February 1945; Reich Labour Service leader, survived the war, imprisoned for 5 years
- Karl Hanke, 12 April 1945 (killed during a POW escape attempt at a transport on 8 June 1945)
- Karl Holz, 19 April 1945 (killed in action during the Fall of Nuremberg, 20 April 1945)
- Artur Axmann, 28 April 1945, leader of the Hitler Youth and witness of Hitler's suicide; survived the war, imprisoned for three years

== See also ==
- Political decorations of the Nazi Party
