= Franz Ritter von Hörauf =

German military officer and SA general (1878–1957)

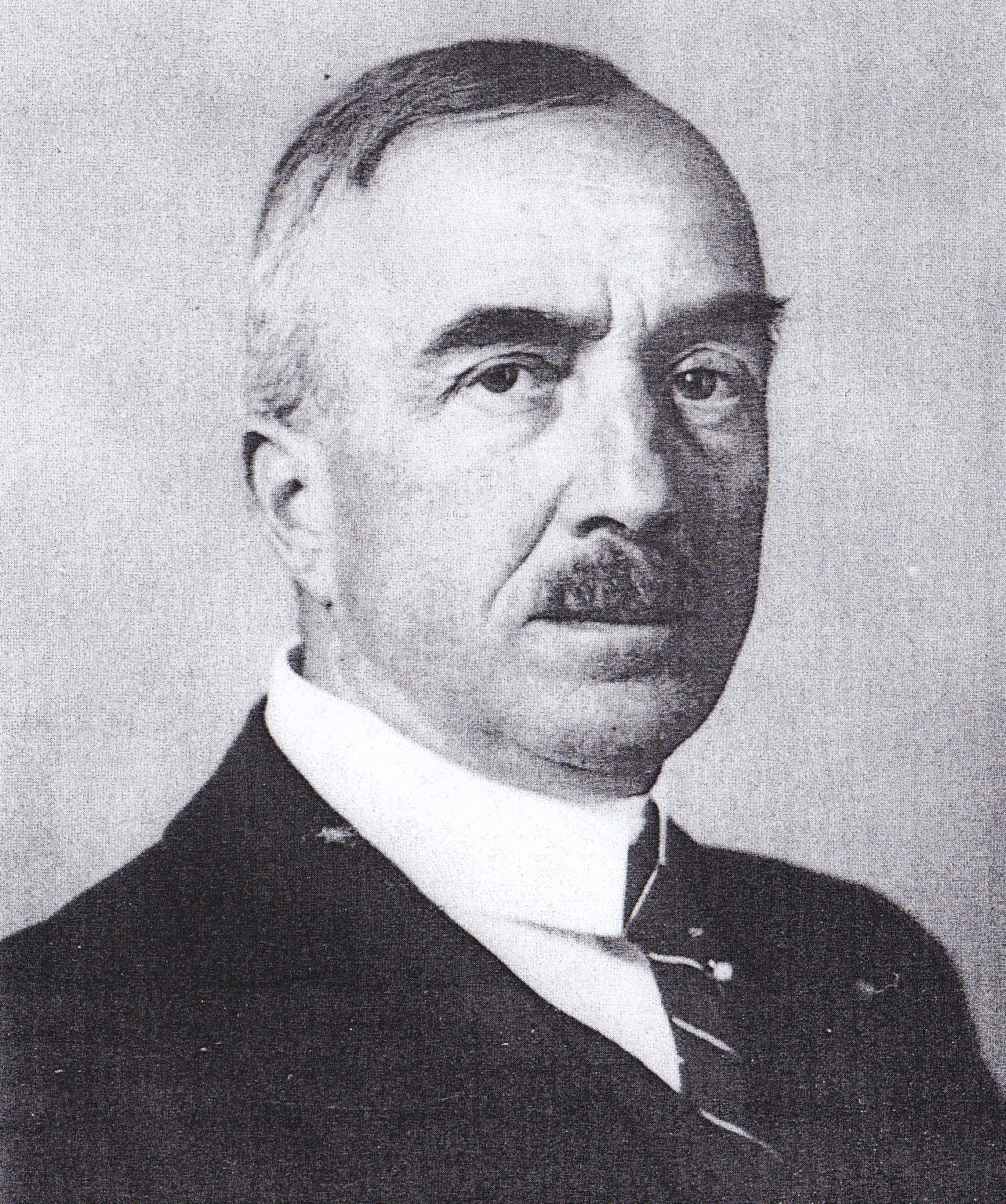
- Hörauf c. 1928

Military Commandant, Litzmannstadt
- In office 10 November 1939 – 31 January 1943

Supreme SA Leadership (OSAF) Staff
- In office 10 March 1933 – 8 May 1945

Chief, OSAF Training Staff and Inspector of SA Schools
- In office 1 July 1932 – 20 November 1932

Chief, OSAF Führungsstab and Leiter, Amt I (Administration)
- In office 1931 – 13 April 1932

Chief of Staff, OSAF Quartermaster Staff
- In office 1 March 1931 – 1931

Additional positions
- 1937–1945: Judge, People's Court

Personal details
- Born: Franz von Hörauf; 16 July 1878 Landau, Kingdom of Bavaria, German Empire
- Died: 8 December 1957 (aged 79) Munich, Bavaria, West Germany
- Party: Nazi Party
- Profession: Military officer
- Civilian awards: Brunswick Rally Badge

Military service
- Allegiance: German Empire; Weimar Republic; Nazi Germany
- Branch/service: Royal Bavarian Army; Freikorps; Reichswehr; German Army
- Years of service: 1896–1928; 1939–1943
- Rank: Generalmajor
- Unit: 10th Bavarian Infantry Regiment; German General Staff; Freikorps Epp; 21st Reichswehr Infantry Regiment
- Battles/wars: World War I World War II
- Military awards: Knight's Cross of the Military Order of Max Joseph; Knight's Cross of the Royal House Order of Hohenzollern, with swords Iron Cross, 1st and 2nd class

Franz Ritter von Hörauf (16 July 1878 – 8 December 1957) was a German professional military officer who notably was active for nearly fifty years in the German Empire, the Weimar Republic and Nazi Germany. He served in the Royal Bavarian Army in the First World War and became a highly decorated general staff officer. During the republic, he was active in the Freikorps and the Reichswehr. He then joined the Nazi Party and its paramilitary unit, the Sturmabteilung (SA) and rose to the rank of SA-Obergruppenführer. He returned to active military service with the German Army during the Second World War as a Generalmajor and served as the military commandant of occupied Łódź for over three years.

== Early life and World War I ==
Hörauf was born Franz Hörauf in Landau, the son of a barracks inspector. He attended the prestigious Wilhelmsgymnasium in Munich and graduated with his Abitur in 1896. In July of that year, he entered the Royal Bavarian Army as a Fahnenjunker (military cadet) with Infantry Regiment 10 "King Ludwig" in Ingolstadt.

From March 1897 to February 1898, Hörauf attended to the War School in Munich and then was commissioned as a Leutnant on 6 March 1898. He became an instructional officer in 1901 for the 10th Field Artillery Regiment and, from December 1905, served as the regimental adjutant, being promoted to Oberleutnant on 26 October 1907. Among his fellow soldiers at this time was Ernst Röhm, who would later play a large part in his life. From October 1908 through September 1911, Hörauf attended the War Academy, which qualified him for a posting on the German General Staff at the age of only 33. Subsequently, from 26 August 1912, he completed tours with the staffs of the 6th Cavalry Brigade, the 6th Field Artillery Brigade and the 6th Division before returning to the General Staff on 1 October 1912. Hörauf was promoted to Hauptmann on 28 October 1912, and he returned to the War Academy on 1 April 1913 as an instructor of tactics until July 1914.

At the beginning of the First World War, Hörauf became the general staff quartermaster officer at the III Army Corps in August 1914, with which he was deployed to the western front. On 21 May 1915, he was transferred as a general staff officer to the German Alpine Corps. From 21 July 1916, Hörauf was the chief of staff of the 12th Infantry Division. Promoted to Major on 17 January 1917, he was detached for training with the Army Group "Kronprinz Rupprecht" in December 1917, before taking up the position of chief of staff from 30 January 1918 in the I Reserve Corps, a post he held until the end of the war. Hörauf was highly decorated for his achievements during the war and received, among others, the Iron Cross, 1st and 2nd class, and the Knight's Cross of the Military Order of Max Joseph. Associated with the latter was his elevation to the German nobility, and he was allowed to style himself Ritter von Hörauf.

== Freikorps and Reichswehr service ==
After the end of the war, Hörauf remained in the military and joined the Freikorps Epp, commanded by fellow-Bavarian Franz Ritter von Epp on 11 March 1919. He was accepted into the Reichswehr of the new Weimar Republic, and served as the chief of staff of Brigade 21 (May 1919 to September 1920) and then of Infanterierführers VII in Munich (October 1920 to June 1921). On 2 June 1921, Hörauf temporarily was placed in charge of the 1st Battalion of the 21st Infantry Regiment. He was promoted to Oberstleutnant on 1 July 1921 and formally appointed commander of the battalion on 1 October 1921. From 1 October 1923 to 11 January 1924, he worked as an instructor at the Central Infantry School in Munich. He next was transferred to the 7th Division and, on 1 April 1924, he was assigned to Gruppenkommando 2 in Kassel and placed in charge of the division's Führergehilfenausbildung, (assistant leader training) which was the program by which the Reichswehr circumvented the Versailles Treaty's prohibition against training general staff officers. On 1 August 1925, Hörauf was posted to the staff of the 21st Infantry Regiment, and was promoted to Oberst on 1 February 1926. On 31 January 1928, Hörauf retired from active service with the rank of brevet Generalmajor, and he became a member of the conservative war veteran's organization, Der Stahlhelm.

== Career in the Nazi Sturmabteilung (SA) ==
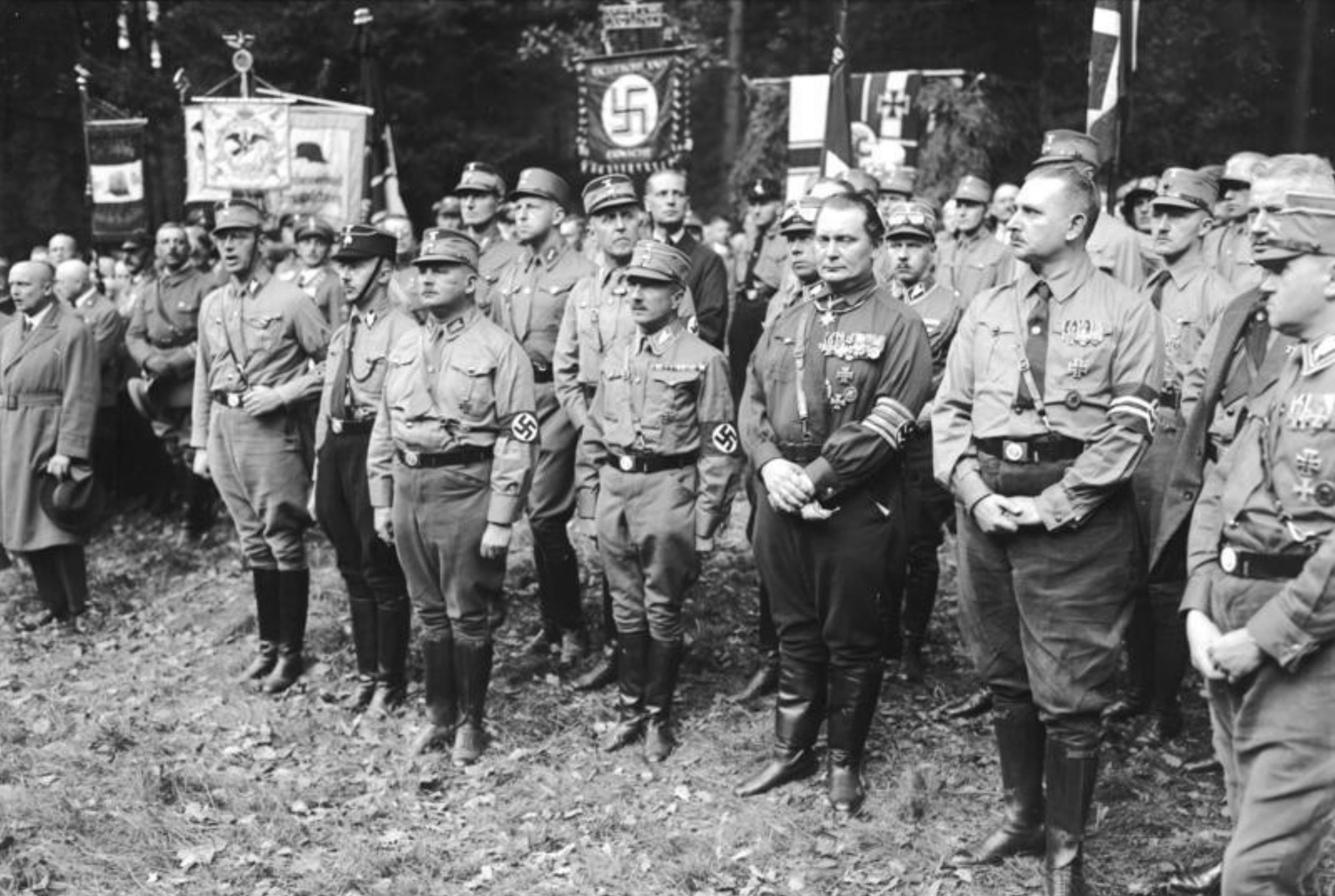
Hörauf (first row center, between Ernst Röhm and Hermann Göring) at the Harzburg Front Conference in October 1931

On 1 December 1930, Hörauf joined the Nazi Party (membership number 374,771) at the Ortsgruppe (local group) Bogenhausen. On 1 March 1931, he also became a member of the paramilitary Sturmabteilung (SA). Ernst Röhm, his old comrade from the Bavarian infantry had been appointed the SA-Stabschef in January 1931. Röhm chose Hörauf and several other old comrades from his Bavarian Army days for key assignments in staffing the SA leadership, in large part because he knew and trusted them. In addition, Röhm had served with Hörauf in the Freikorps Epp.

Hörauf was given the rank of SA-Gruppenführer and immediately assigned to the Supreme SA Leadership (OSAF) as the chief of staff of the Quartermaster Staff. Later that year, he became the head of Amt (office) I (Administration) until April 1932. He attended the meeting in Bad Harzburg that established the Harzburg Front, a unified conservative opposition to the Weimar Republic. He also took part in the massive SA rally in Braunschweig on 18 October 1931, for which he was awarded the Nazi Brunswick Rally Badge. From 1 July to 20 November 1932, he was the Chief of Training and Inspector of SA Schools. He was then assigned as the ceremonial parade march inspector until 10 March 1933. At that point, he was released from active-duty SA status but remained on the staff of the OSAF as a leader available for special assignments. Hörauf then became a Referent (advisor) on military matters to the Bavarian state government chancellery. On 22 December 1937, he secured an appointment as a lay judge on the People's Court that was renewed in 1941. From 1939, he also was the Bavarian State Chairman of the German War Graves Welfare Association.

=== Brown House Mole ===
While working at the Munich Brown House, Hörauf covertly supplied internal SA intelligence to government and monarchist contacts, but was never detected by SA security. This intelligence included Chancellor Kurt von Schleicher learning of Gregor Strasser's split with Hitler as well as providing former Crown Prince Wilhelm news of the Nazi Party's financial troubles.

== Second World War ==
Just before the launching of the Second World War, Hörauf was mobilized into active service at the disposal of the Wehrmacht on 26 August 1939. Following the successful conquest of Poland and the occupation of Łódź, he was appointed commandant of that city on 10 November 1939. On 12 April 1940, as part of the Germanization process, the city was renamed Litzmannstadt, after the German WWI General Karl Litzmann. On 1 December 1940, Hörauf was promoted to Generalmajor. On 31 January 1943, he left his command in Litzmannstadt and was transferred to the Führerreserve. He was demobilized on 31 March 1943 and returned to his post on the OSAF staff.

== Post-war life ==
After the end of the war, Hörauf was interned by the Allies from 1 September 1945 to 30 April 1948. He was in the Dachau internment camp until June 1947, then in a camp in Hammelburg. Hörauf underwent a denazification process and, on 29 April 1948, he was initially classified in Group III (minor offender). However, on appeal, he was subsequently reclassified into Group IV (follower) on 8 March 1949. He then lived in Munich and died there in December 1957.

== Army and SA ranks ==
Army and SA ranks
Date	Rank
14 July 1896	Fahnenjunker
23 January 1897	Fähnrich
6 March 1898	Leutnant
26 October 1907	Oberleutnant
26 October 1912	Hauptmann
17 January 1917	Major
1 July 1921	Oberstleutnant
1 February 1926	Oberst
31 January 1928	brevet Generalmajor
1 March 1931	SA-Gruppenführer
1 December 1940	Generalmajor
30 January 1941	SA-Obergruppenführer

== Military awards ==
Hörauf was a highly decorated veteran of the First World War. Below is a partial list of his notable military awards.

- Knight's Cross of the Military Order of Max Joseph
- Knight's Cross of the Royal House Order of Hohenzollern, with swords
- Iron Cross, 1st and 2nd class
- Military Merit Order (Bavaria), 3rd class with swords
- General Honor Decoration (Hesse)
- Military Merit Cross (Mecklenburg-Schwerin), 2nd class
- Order of the Iron Crown (Austria), 3rd class

== Sources ==
- Campbell, Bruce (1998). The SA Generals and the Rise of Nazism. Lexington: University Press of Kentucky. ISBN 978-0-813-12047-8.
- Hörauf, Franz Ritter von entry in the Akten der Reichskanzlei. Weimarer Republik
- Miller, Michael D.; Schulz, Andreas (2015). Leaders of the Storm Troops. Vol. 1. Solihull, England: Helion & Company. ISBN 978-1-909-98287-1.
