= Gau Essen =

Administrative division of Nazi Germany

- Gau of Nazi Germany
- 1928–1945
- Flag Coat of arms

- Gau Essen on the left, bordering The Netherlands
- Capital: Essen
- Area
- 1,900 km^{2} (730 sq mi)
- Population
- 2,800,000
- Government
- Gauleiter
  - 1928–1945: Josef Terboven
- History
  - Established: 1 August 1928
  - German Instrument of Surrender: 8 May 1945
Preceded by	Succeeded by
Rhine Province	North Rhine-Westphalia
- Today part of: Germany

The Gau Essen was an administrative division of Nazi Germany from 1933 to 1945 in the northern parts of the Prussian Rhine Province. Before that, from 1928 to 1933, it was the regional subdivision of the Nazi Party in that area.

== History ==
=== Establishment and government ===
The Nazi Gau (plural Gaue) system was originally established in a party conference on 22 May 1926, in order to improve administration of the party structure. From 1933 onward, after the Nazi seizure of power, the Gaue increasingly replaced the German states as administrative subdivisions in Germany.

At the head of each Gau stood a Gauleiter, a position which became increasingly more powerful, especially after the outbreak of the Second World War, with little interference from above. Local Gauleiters often held government positions as well as party ones and were in charge of, among other things, propaganda and surveillance and, from September 1944 onward, the Volkssturm and the defense of the Gau.

=== World War II ===
The position of Gauleiter in Essen was held by Josef Terboven throughout the history of the Gau. After the German conquest of Norway in 1940 Hitler promoted Terboven Reichskommissar for the occupied country, where he ruled with almost absolute power. He committed suicide on 8 May 1945 by detonating 50 kilograms of explosives in a bunker. While Terboven was in Norway, the Deputy Gauleiter, Fritz Schlessmann, ran the Gau in an acting capacity.

As Gauleiter, Schlessmann had responsibility for air raid defense measures in Essen throughout the war. As a large industrial center and the site of the Krupp armaments works, Essen was a frequent target of Allied bombing raids. In the fall of 1944, Schlessmann was placed in charge of the local Volkssturm forces in Essen and was also charged with improving the fortifications along the area of the Westwall defensive line adjacent to his Gau. He was promoted to the rank of SS-Obergruppenführer on 9 November 1944.

From February to March 1945, Operation Veritable saw the allies advance further into the Gau.

The Gau had a size of 1,900 km2 (2,741 sq mi) and a population of 2,800,000, which placed it in mid-table for size and population in the list of Gaue.

=== Allied invasion and occupation ===
Near the end of World War II, the Gau was invaded by the western allies, who would gradually capture its territory until the end of the war. The timeline of the allied advance is detailed in the table below.

Date of capture	Location	Ref.
8 February 1945	Wyler	
8 February 1945	Frasselt	
8-10 February 1945	Kranenburg	
8-12 February 1945	Kleve	
9 February 1945	Materborn	
17 February 1945	Moyland	
19 February 1945	Goch	
18 February-3 March 1945	Uedem	
21 February 1945	Wertzhof	
22-27 February 1945	Weeze	
25 February 1945	Grotendonk	
26 February-1 March 1945	Kervenheim	
27 February 1945	Kalkar	
1 March 1945	Baal (Hückelhoven)	
1 March 1945	Wemb	
3 March 1945	Winnekendonk	
3 March 1945	Kevelaer	
3 March 1945	Geldern	
3 March 1945	Walbeck (Geldern)	
3 March 1945	Straelen	
4 March 1945	Moers	
4 March 1945	Issum	
4 March 1945	Hamb	
4 March 1945	Marienbaum	
5 March 1945	Sonsbeck	
5 March 1945	Homberg	
5 March 1945	Rheinhausen	
5 March 1945	Kamp-Lintfort	
7 March 1945	Rheinberg	
8 March 1945	Xanten	
9 March 1945	Veen	
23 March 1945	Dinslaken	
26-27 March 1945	Millingen	
26-27 March 1945	Gahlen	
28 March 1945	Haldern	
31 March 1945	Emmerich	
7 April 1945	Altenessen	
11 April 1945	Essen	
12 April 1945	Duisburg	
15 April 1945	Werden	
15 April 1945	Kettwig	

== Sources ==
- Miller, Michael D.; Schulz, Andreas (2021). Gauleiter: The Regional Leaders of the Nazi Party and Their Deputies. Vol. 3. Fonthill Media. ISBN 978-1-781-55826-3.
