= Viktor Lutze =

German Nazi SA chief of staff (1890–1943)

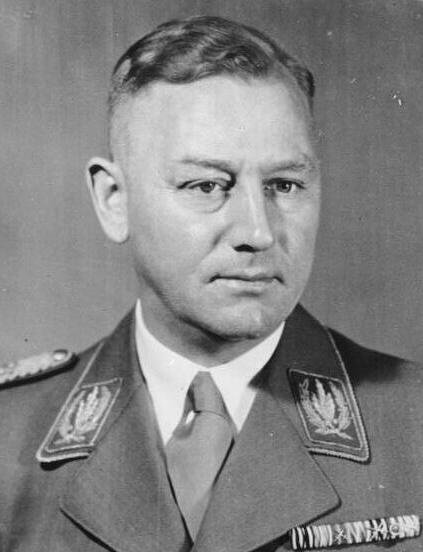
- Lutze in 1938
- Born: 28 December 1890; Bevergern, Province of Westphalia, Kingdom of Prussia, German Empire
- Died: 2 May 1943 (aged 52); Potsdam, Brandenburg, Germany
- Military career
- Allegiance: German Empire; Weimar Republic; Nazi Germany
- Branch: Imperial German Army; Sturmabteilung (SA)
- Service years: 1912–1919; 1923–1943
- Rank: Stabschef SA
- Commands: SA-Gruppe Nord, Sturmabteilung
- Conflicts: World War I
- Awards: 1914 Iron Cross, second and first class Cross of Honour 1914–1918 Combatants; Brunswick Rally Badge; German Order (Posthumous)

Viktor Lutze (28 December 1890 – 2 May 1943) was a German Nazi Party functionary and the commander of the Sturmabteilung ("SA") who succeeded Ernst Röhm as Stabschef and Reichsleiter. After Lutze died from injuries received in a car accident, he was given an elaborate state funeral in Berlin on 7 May 1943.

== Early life ==
Lutze was born in Bevergern, Westphalia, in 1890. He was employed by the Reichspost from 1907 until he joined the Prussian Army in 1912. He served with the 55th Infantry Regiment and then fought in the 369th Infantry Regiment and 15th Reserve Infantry Regiment during the First World War. He served as a platoon leader and a company commander and lost an eye in combat. After his discharge in 1919 with the rank of Oberleutnant, Lutze returned to his postal job and then became a salesman and a business manager. He also joined the Deutschvölkischer Schutz- und Trutzbund, the largest, most active and most influential antisemitic organisation in the Weimar Republic.

== Nazi Party and SA ==
Lutze joined the National Socialist German Workers Party (NSDAP; Nazi Party) in 1922, and the SA in 1923. He also worked with Albert Leo Schlageter in the resistance and the sabotage of the Belgian and French occupation of the Ruhr in 1923. He became the deputy Gauleiter for the Ruhr in 1926. His organization of the Ruhr for the SA became a model for other regions. He became an associate of Franz Pfeffer von Salomon, the Supreme SA Leader from 1926 to 1930. Together, they determined the structure of the organisation.

In September 1930, Lutze was elected to the Reichstag as a deputy for electoral constituency 16, South Hanover–Braunschweig. He would retain a Reichstag seat until his death, switching to constituency 7, Breslau, at the March 1936 election.

In October 1931, Lutze organized a huge joint rally in Braunschweig (Brunswick) of SA and SS men to show strength in strife-weary Germany and loyalty to their leader, Adolf Hitler. That was before Hitler came to national power as Chancellor of Germany in January 1933. Over 100,000 men attended the rally, hosted by SA-Gruppe Nord under the leadership of Lutze. At the rally, the SA assured Hitler of their loyalty, and he in turn increased the size of the SA with the creation of 24 new Standarten (regiment-sized formations). Hitler never forgot that show of loyalty by Lutze. A badge was made to commemorate the event. Lutze rose through the ranks and by 1933 was an SA-Obergruppenführer. On 15 February 1933, he was appointed police president of the Prussian Province of Hanover and, on 25 March 1933, he became the Oberpräsident of the provincial government and served until 28 March 1941. On 14 September 1933, came his appointment to the recently reconstituted Prussian State Council.

=== Purge of Röhm ===
Lutze played an important part in the Night of the Long Knives (June–July 1934). He informed Hitler about Ernst Röhm's anti-régime activities. In preparation for the purge, both Heinrich Himmler and his deputy, Reinhard Heydrich, chief of the SS Security Service (SD), assembled dossiers of manufactured evidence to suggest that Röhm had planned to overthrow Hitler. Meanwhile, Göring, Himmler, Heydrich and Lutze, at Hitler's direction, drew up lists of those who should be liquidated that started with seven top SA officials and including many more. The names of 85 victims are known, but estimates place the total number killed at up to 200 people.

After the purge, Lutze succeeded Röhm as Stabschef SA, but the SA no longer had as prominent a role as it had in the early days of the party. Lutze's major tasks included overseeing a large reduction in the SA, a task that was welcomed by the SS and by the regular armed forces. On 30 June 1934, Hitler issued a twelve-point directive to Lutze to clean up and to reorganise the SA. On 20 July 1934, Lutze also was appointed to Röhm's position as a Reichsleiter, the second-highest political rank in the Nazi Party. On 26 June 1935, he was made a member of Hans Frank's Academy for German Law. He retained those positions until his death.

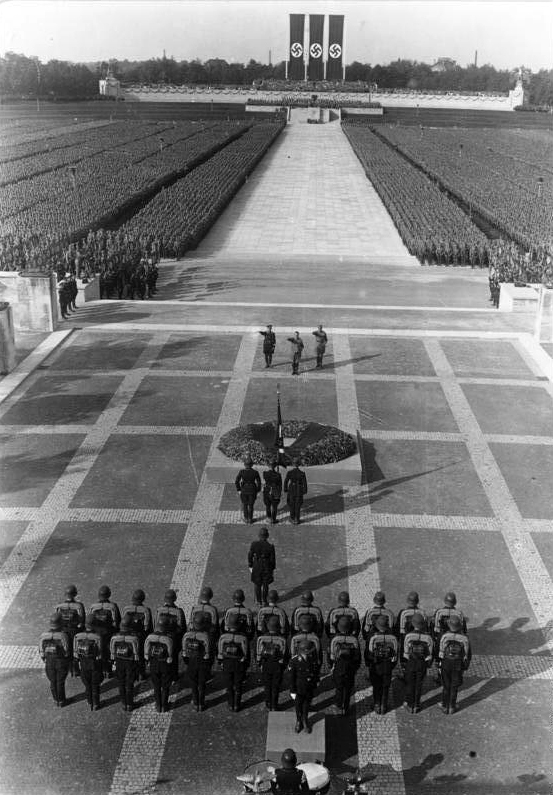
Hitler (centre, in front of the wreath), Lutze (on Hitler's left), and Himmler (on Hitler's right), giving a Nazi salute in front of the First World War cenotaph in the 1934 Nuremberg rally

At the Nazi Party Congress in Nuremberg in September 1934, William L. Shirer observed Hitler speaking to the SA for the first time since the purge (Hitler had absolved the SA from the crimes committed by Röhm). Shirer also noted Lutze speaking there (Lutze reaffirmed the SA's loyalty). Shirer described Lutze as possessing a shrill unpleasant voice, and thought that the "SA boys received him coolly". Leni Riefenstahl's film Triumph of the Will, however, shows the SA mobbing Lutze as he departs at the end of his evening-rally speech. His automobile can barely make it through the crowd. Alone among the speakers (apart from Hitler), Lutze receives the dramatic low-angle shots while he stands solo at the podium. Riefenstahl's footage shows only Hitler, Himmler and Lutze in the march to the World War I cenotaph, where they lay a wreath. The makers of the film give the then little-known Lutze some of the prestige of a party leader to draw attention away from the former SA leader, Ernst Röhm, who had appeared often by the side of Hitler in the previous Riefenstahl film of the 1933 Party Congress, Der Sieg des Glaubens. After the Night of the Long Knives and Röhm's murder, the film was withdrawn from circulation, and all prints were ordered destroyed, probably by Hitler; the film is known today only from a copy found in the Film Archive of the German Democratic Republic in the 1980s.

=== Foreign organisation ===
After the Anschluss, Lutze traveled to Austria to help reorganise the SA there.

In September 1938, SA Stabschef Lutze travelled to Passau to welcome Nazis who had returned from the Reichsparteitag in Nuremberg. Lutze stayed at "Veste Oberhaus" and seized the opportunity to meet Johann Nepomuk Kühberger, who had once helped to save Hitler from drowning in the Inn River. Now, he was a priest and played the organ at Passau Cathedral.

The reintroduction of military conscription in 1935 reduced the size of the SA significantly. Its most visible role after the purge was in assisting the SS in perpetrating the Kristallnacht in November 1938. In February 1939, Lutze reviewed a parade of 20,000 Blackshirts in Rome and then set off for a tour of Italy's Libyan border with Tunisia.

== Death and funeral ==
In January 1939, the role of the SA was officially mandated as a training school for the armed forces with the establishment of the SA Wehrmannschaften (SA Military Units). Then, in September 1939, with the start of World War II in Europe, the SA lost most of its remaining members to military service in the Wehrmacht (armed forces). Lutze maintained his position in the weakened SA until his death.

On 1 May 1943, his son Viktor was driving a car with Lutze and his entire family on the Reichsautobahn en route to Berlin. Near Michendorf, they were involved in an accident. The son was speeding, swerved to avoid pedestrians in the road, lost control, skidded and the car rolled over. Lutze was badly injured and his older daughter Inge was killed. Lutze died during an operation in a hospital in Potsdam the next evening. According to another version, Lutze died as a result of a Ukrainian Insurgent Army (UPA) ambush and the "traffic accident" narrative was used by German media to cover up the real cause of his death.

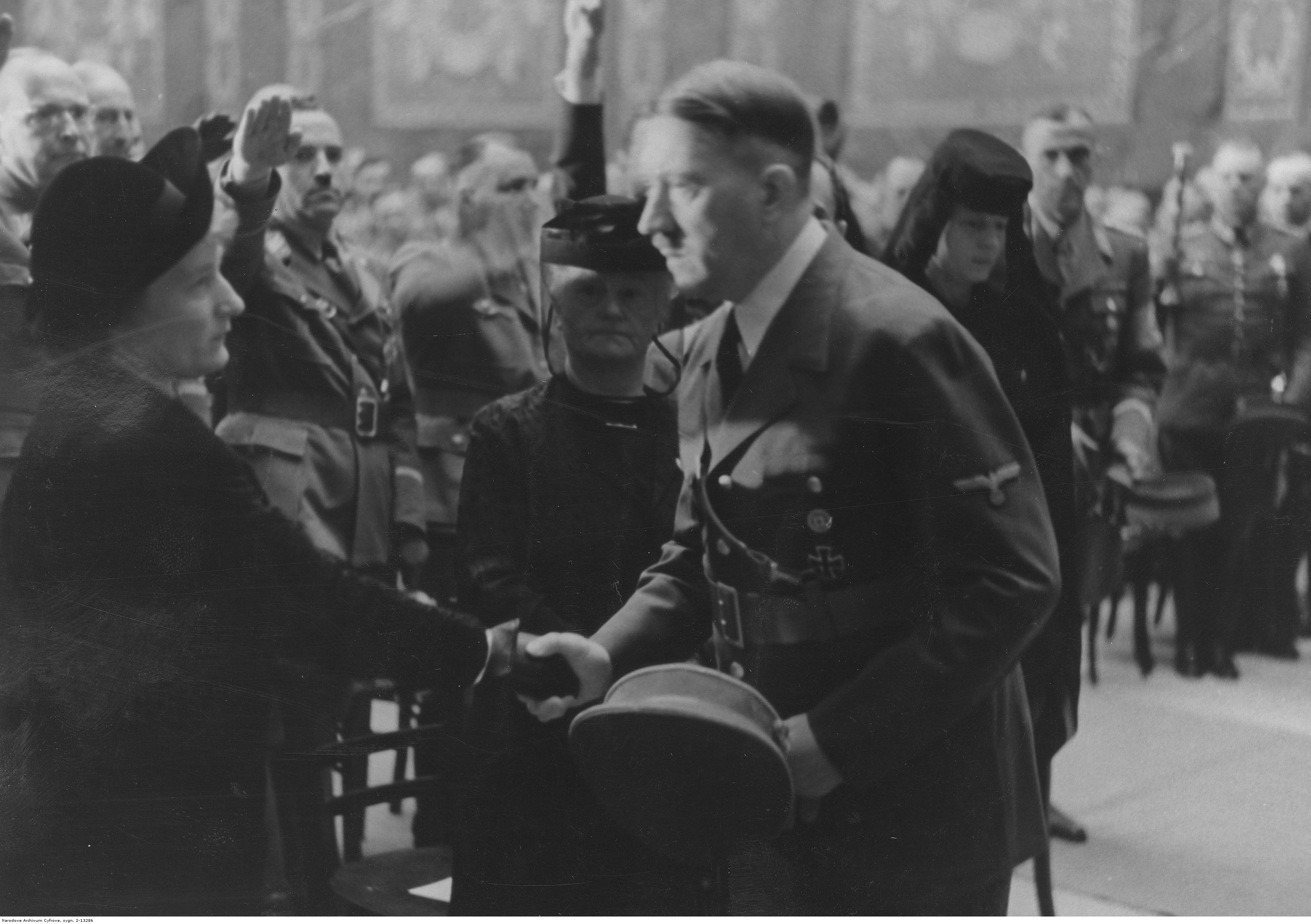
Adolf Hitler with the widowed Paula Lutze at the Viktor Lutze state funeral, 7 May 1943

News reports stated that the accident involved another vehicle and kept the news of reckless driving from the public. Hitler ordered Joseph Goebbels to convey his condolences to Lutze's wife, Paula, and son, Viktor. Goebbels, in his diaries, had described Lutze as a man of "unlimited stupidity" but upon his death decided that he was a decent fellow. At the time of the accident, Lutze was 52 years old.

Hitler ordered a lavish state funeral on 7 May 1943 to take place in the Reich Chancellery. Hitler attended in person, which he rarely did at that stage in the war, and posthumously awarded Lutze the highest award of the Nazi Party, the German Order, 1st Class. Thereafter, Hitler appointed Wilhelm Schepmann to succeed Lutze as Stabschef SA, but the organisation had by then been thoroughly marginalised.

== Decorations and awards ==
- 1914 Iron Cross 2nd Class
- 1914 Iron Cross 1st Class
- 1918 Wound Badge in Silver
- Commander's Cross of the Order of Military Merit (Bulgaria) with War Decoration, 16.7.1918
- 1929 Nuremberg Party Day Badge, 1929
- The Honour Cross of the World War 1914/1918 with Swords, 1934
- Anschluss Medal, 1938
- Sudetenland Medal, 1939

== See also ==
- Glossary of Nazi Germany
- List of Nazi Party leaders and officials

== Bibliography ==
- Angolia, John (1989). For Führer and Fatherland: Political & Civil Awards of the Third Reich. R. James Bender Publishing. ISBN 0912138165.
- Hamilton, Charles (1984). Leaders & Personalities of the Third Reich, Vol. 1. R. James Bender Publishing. ISBN 0912138270.
- Herzstein, Robert Edwin (2004) [1980]. The Nazis. Time-Life Books, Inc. ISBN 978-1844471935.
- Kershaw, Ian (2008). Hitler: A Biography. New York: W. W. Norton & Company. ISBN 978-0-393-06757-6.
- McNab, Chris (2009). The SS: 1923–1945. Amber Books Ltd. ISBN 978-1-906626-49-5.
- McNab, Chris (2013). Hitler's Elite: The SS 1939–45. Osprey Publishing. ISBN 978-1-78200-088-4.
- Miller, Michael D.; Schulz, Andreas (2015). Leaders of the Storm Troops. Vol. 1. Solihull, England: Helion & Company. ISBN 978-1-909982-87-1.
- Miller, Michael; Schulz, Andreas (2017). Gauleiter: The Regional Leaders of the Nazi Party and Their Deputies, 1925-1945. Vol. II (Georg Joel - Dr. Bernhard Rust. R. James Bender Publishing. ISBN 978-1-932970-32-6.
- Rosmus, Anna (2015). Hitlers Nibelungen, Samples Grafenau.
- Snyder, Louis (1994) [1976]. Encyclopedia of the Third Reich. Da Capo Press. ISBN 978-1-56924-917-8.
- Zentner, Christian; Bedürftig, Friedemann (1991). The Encyclopedia of the Third Reich. New York: MacMillan. ISBN 0-02-897500-6.

Military offices
Preceded by Ernst Röhm	Stabschef (chief of staff) of the Sturmabteilung (SA); 1934–1943	Succeeded by Wilhelm Schepmann
