= Golden Party Badge =

Nazi award from 1933 to 1945

Golden Party Badge Goldenes Parteiabzeichen (German)
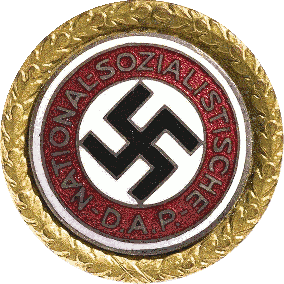

Awarded by Nazi Party
- Type: Badge
- Established: October 1933
- Country: Nazi Germany
- Eligibility: Members of the Nazi Party
- Awarded for: Being one of the first 100,000 members of the Nazi Party
- Status: Abolished, banned

Statistics
- First induction: 1933
- Last induction: 1945
- Total inductees: 22,282 (apart from a certain number personally awarded by Hitler)

Precedence
- Next (lower): Nazi Party membership badge
- Related: German Order

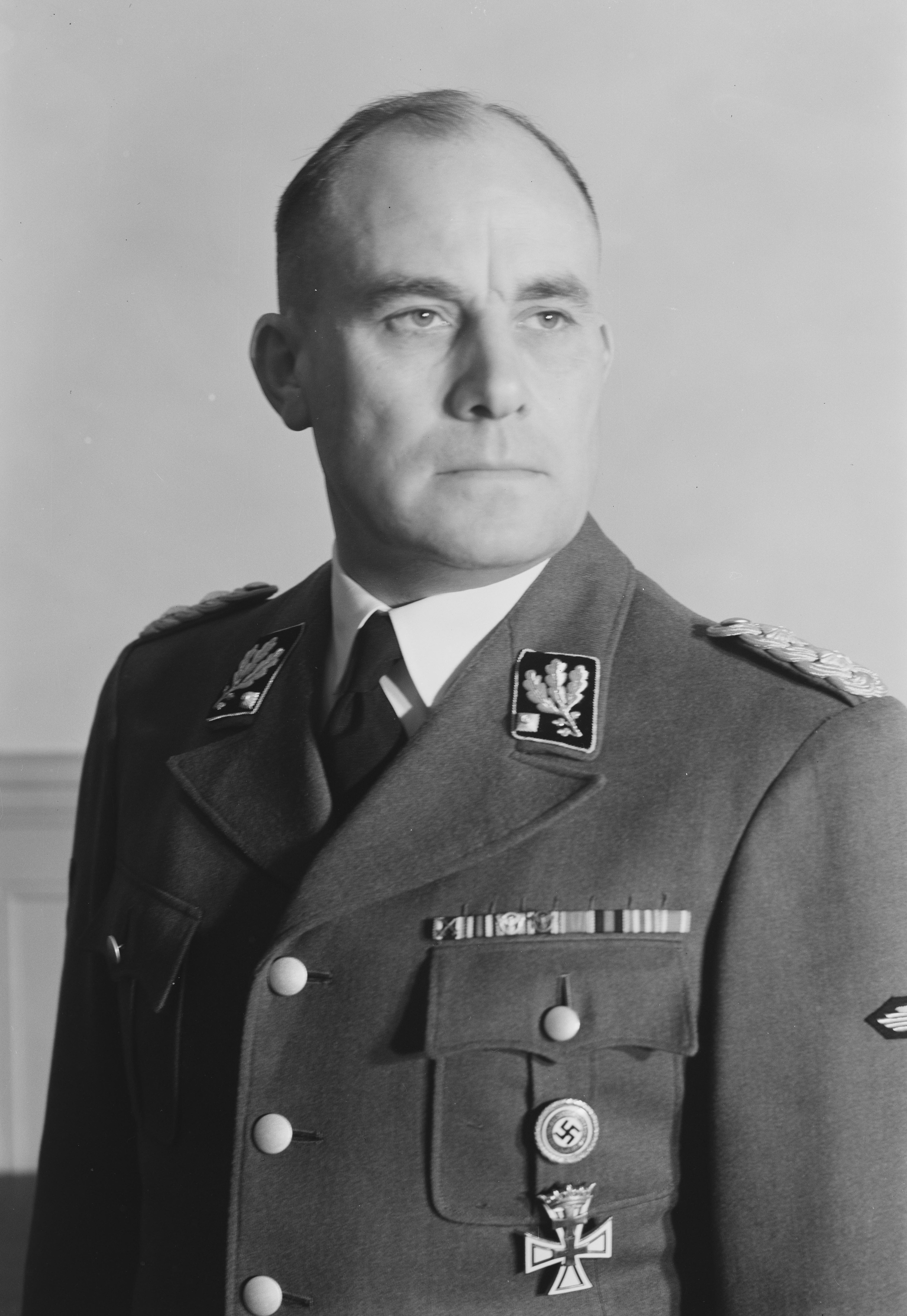
Wilhelm Rediess in 1941, displaying the proper position of the Golden Party Badge on his uniform's left breast pocket

The Golden Party Badge (German: Goldenes Parteiabzeichen) was an award authorised by Adolf Hitler in a decree in October 1933. It was a special award given to all Nazi Party members who had, as of 9 November 1933, registered numbers from 1 to 100,000 (issued on 1 October 1928) and had unbroken party membership. The recipient's party number was inscribed on the reverse of the badge. A total of 20,487 men and 1,795 women were awarded the badge on these terms.

The Golden Party Badge was also awarded at the discretion of Hitler to certain members of the party who merited special treatment and, on 30 January each year, to persons who had shown outstanding service to the Nazi Party or State. These badges had the initials 'A.H.' and the date of the award on the reverse. Examples of such awards include to General Wilhelm Keitel for his direction of the 1938 occupation of the Sudetenland, and to Grand Admiral Karl Dönitz on 30 January 1944 for war services.

== Award ==
The Golden Party Badge was the basic Nazi Party Badge with the addition of a gold wreath completely encircling the badge. The badge was awarded in two sizes: 30.5 mm for wear on service uniforms and 24 mm for wear on a suit jacket. In the event of the death of the recipient, the badge would be kept by the family. However, due to the numbered certificate, no one else was allowed to wear the badge.

While Adolf Hitler's original personal Golden Party Badges were stamped with the number '7', his issued German Workers' Party (DAP) number was '555'. In the beginning, the party began counting membership at 500 to give the impression they were a much larger party.

In Hitler's biographical book, Mein Kampf, he declared that his DAP membership was number '7'. He was in fact only the seventh member of the leadership committee. The DAP was the precursor of the Nazi Party (NSDAP).

There has been an incorrect assumption that Hitler's original Golden Party Badges were numbered '1'. This belief stems from Hitler being re-issued Party membership '1' during the reformation of the Nazi Party in 1925. That was the number on his Golden Party Badge that he presented to Magda Goebbels on 27 April 1945. Further there was article which was printed in The Times of London on 19 November 2005, which stated that his Golden Party Badge, according to Russian sources, was numbered '1'. The Times article also stated that the badge was stolen on 30 June 2005, from a display at the State Archive of the Russian Federation Museum. The Russians reportedly explained that the guards thought the alarm was activated by a cat and this is why the break in was ignored. According to the article, after the theft was reported, the Federal Security Service insisted the stolen badge was a copy. But a source at the state archive disputed that, saying that only after the theft it was alleged to be a copy. The article was accompanied by a photograph showing the reverse of a party badge displaying the number '1'. The caption read: "Among the 10,000 issued in 1934, the badge for Hitler is 'No. 1'."

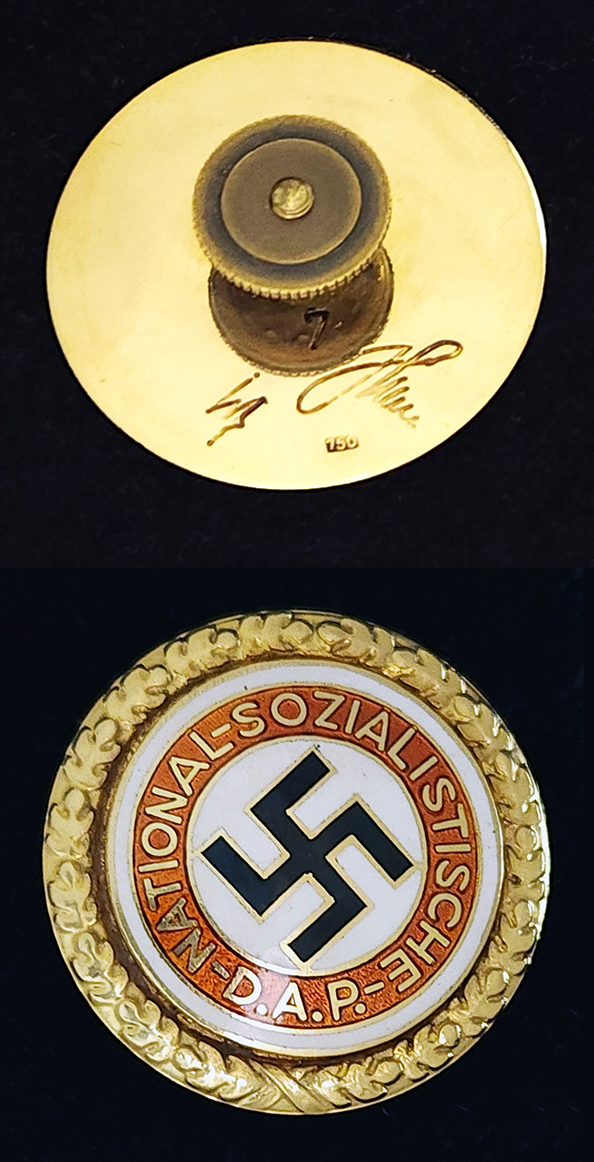
Adolf Hitler's personal Golden Party Badge

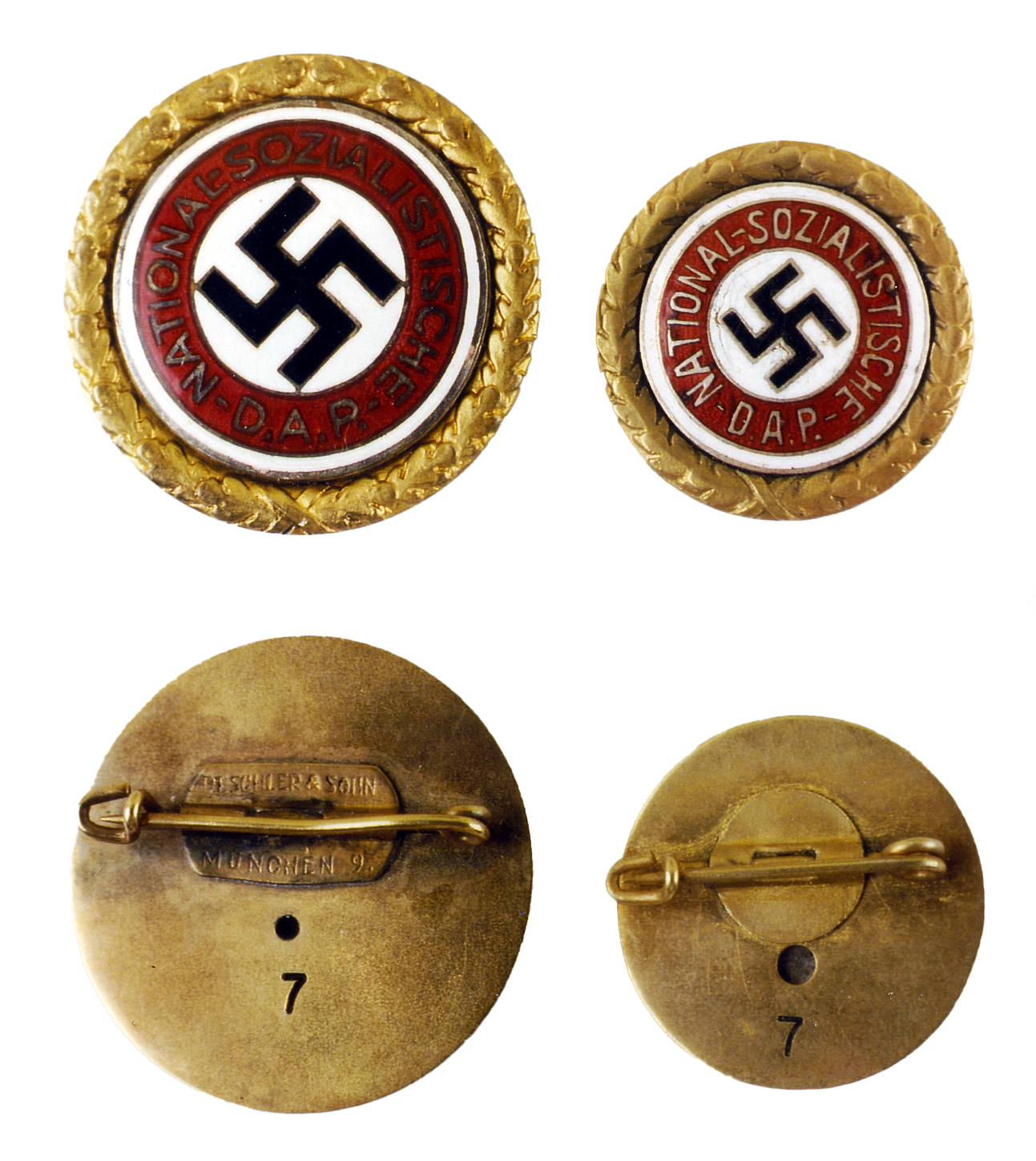
Hitler's Golden Party Pins with the number "7" clearly visible

In 1939, Rudolf Hess had explored the possibility of making the Golden Party Badge the first degree of a multi-degree award of the German Order. In Hess' proposal, the Golden Party Badge would have been the lowest degree, followed by a 2nd class medal, 1st class cross, and then a Knight's Cross neck order. Hess's degrees were never instituted, but the later German Order retained the Golden Party Badge as its centerpiece.

The public wearing of all Nazi Party badges, including the Golden Party Badge, was banned in 1945.

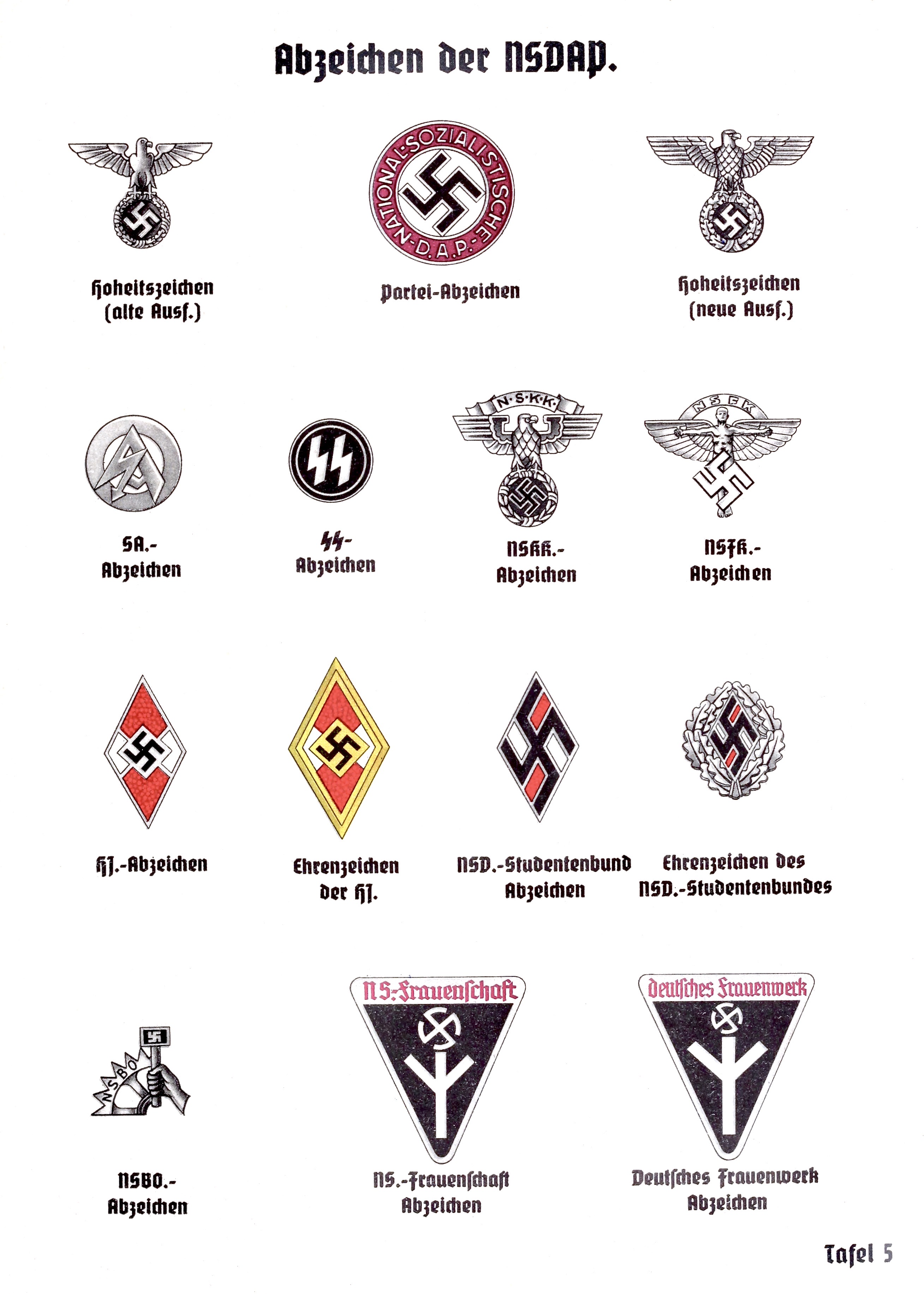
Nazi Party membership badge Partei-Abzeichen (23 mm).

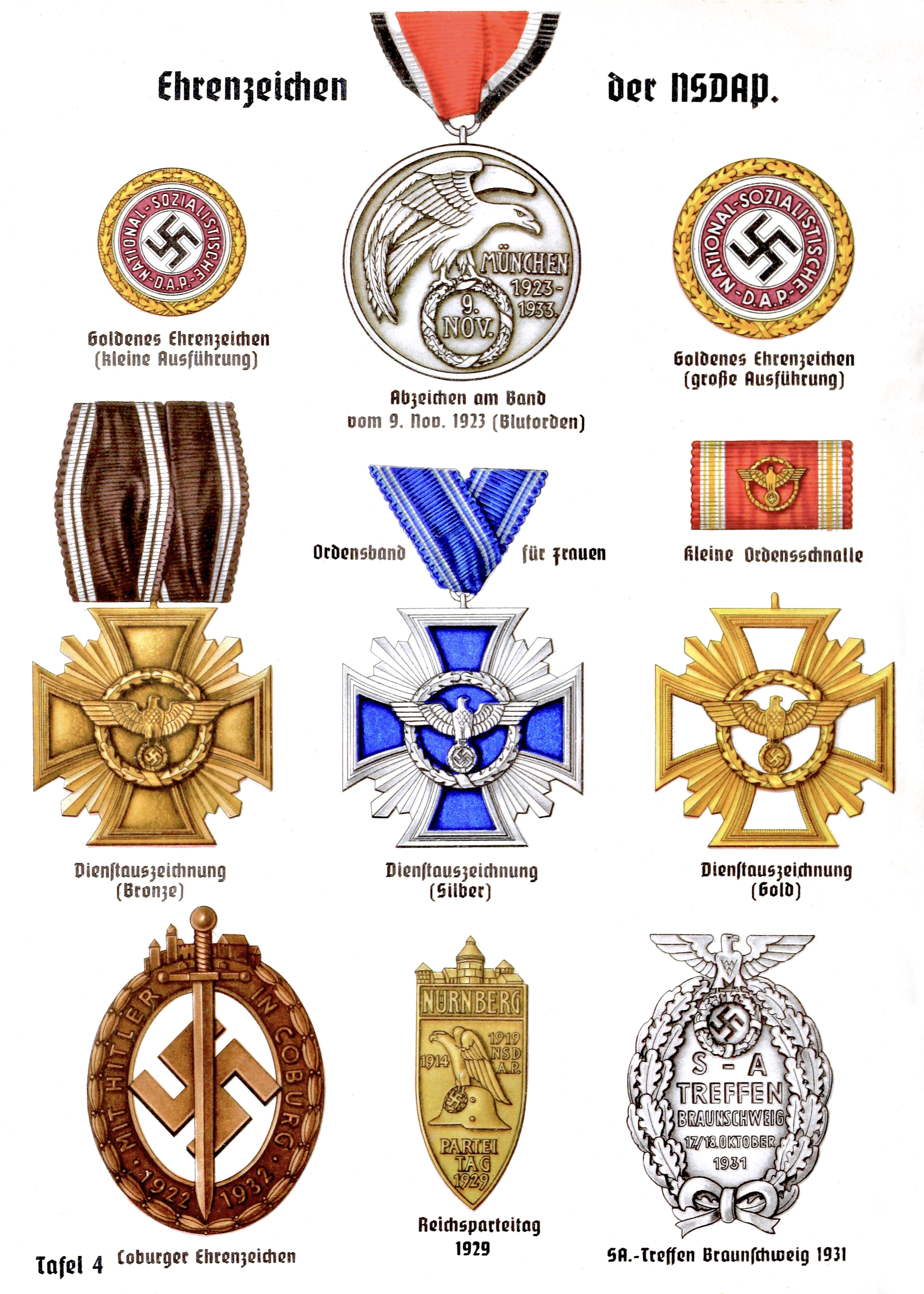
Golden Party Badge, small version (24 mm) for wear on a suit jacket.

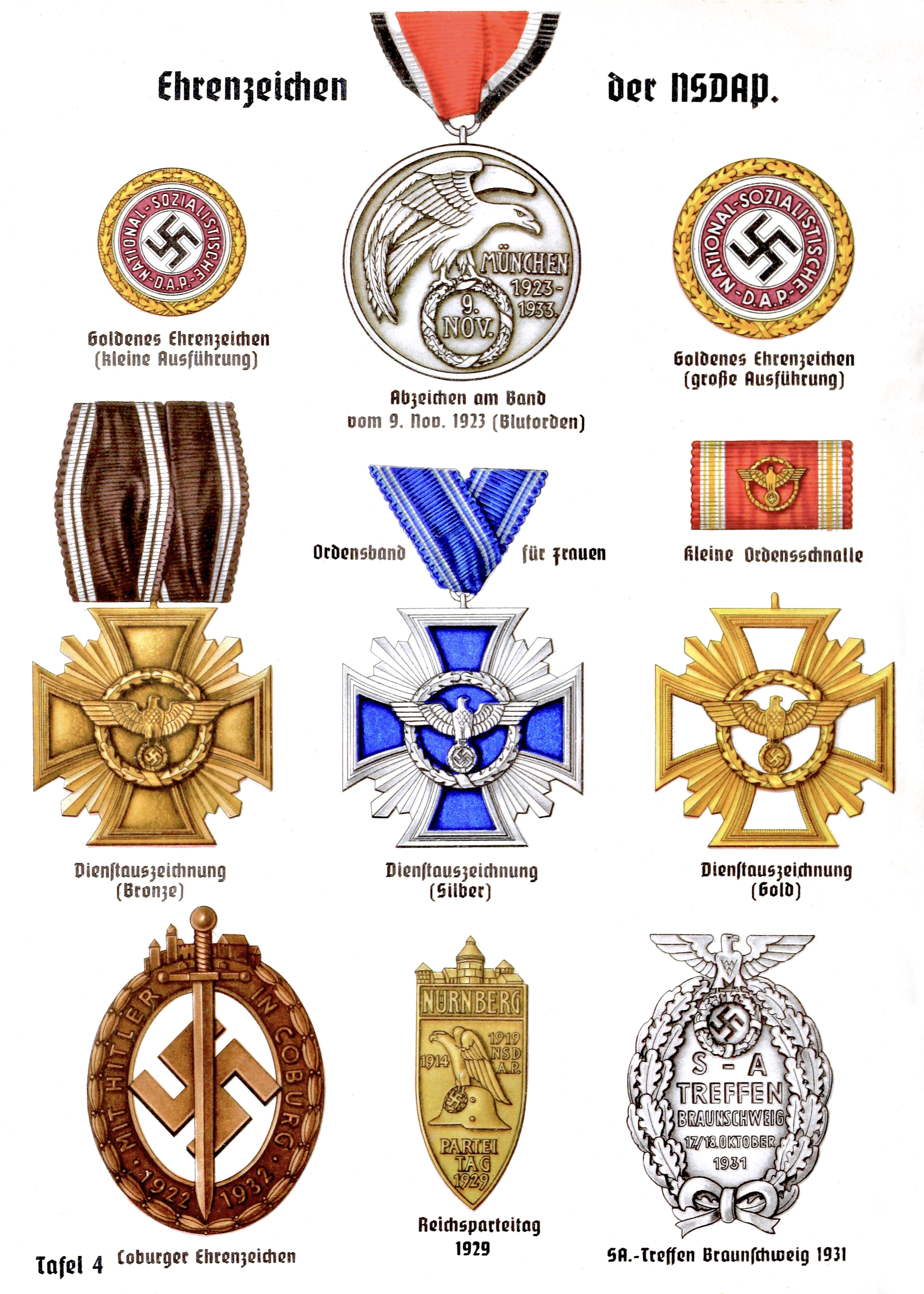
Golden Party Badge, large version (30 mm) for wear on a uniform.

== See also ==
- Political decorations of the Nazi Party

== Sources ==
- Angolia, John (1989). For Führer and Fatherland: Political & Civil Awards of the Third Reich. R. James Bender Publishing. ISBN 978-0-912-13816-9.
- Benz, Wolfgang; Graml, Hermann; Weiß, Hermann (1998). Enzyklopädie des Nationalsozialismus (in German). Klett-Cotta, Stuttgart. ISBN 3-608-91805-1.
- Doehle, Heinrich (1995) [1943]. Medals & Decorations of the Third Reich: Badges, Decorations, Insignia. Reddick Enterprises. ISBN 0962488348.
- Kershaw, Ian (1998). Hitler, 1889-1936: Hubris (1st American ed.). New York: W.W. Norton. ISBN 0393046710.
- Kershaw, Ian (2008). Hitler: A Biography. New York: W. W. Norton & Company. ISBN 978-0-393-06757-6.
- Littlejohn, David; Dodkins, Colonel C. M. (1968). Orders, Decorations, Medals and Badges of the Third Reich. R. James Bender Publishing, California. ISBN 978-0854200801.
- Ley, Robert (1943). Organisationsbuch der NSDAP (in German) (7th ed.). München: Zentralverlag der NSDAP.
- Lumsden, Robin (2001). Medals and Decorations of Hitler's Germany. Zenith Books, Osceola, Wisconsin. ISBN 0760311331.
- Page, Jeremy; Vinogradova, Luba (19 November 2005). "Trophy-hunter steals Hitler badge". The Times. No. 68549. p. 3.
