= Political decorations of the Nazi Party =

Medals and awards of Nazi Germany

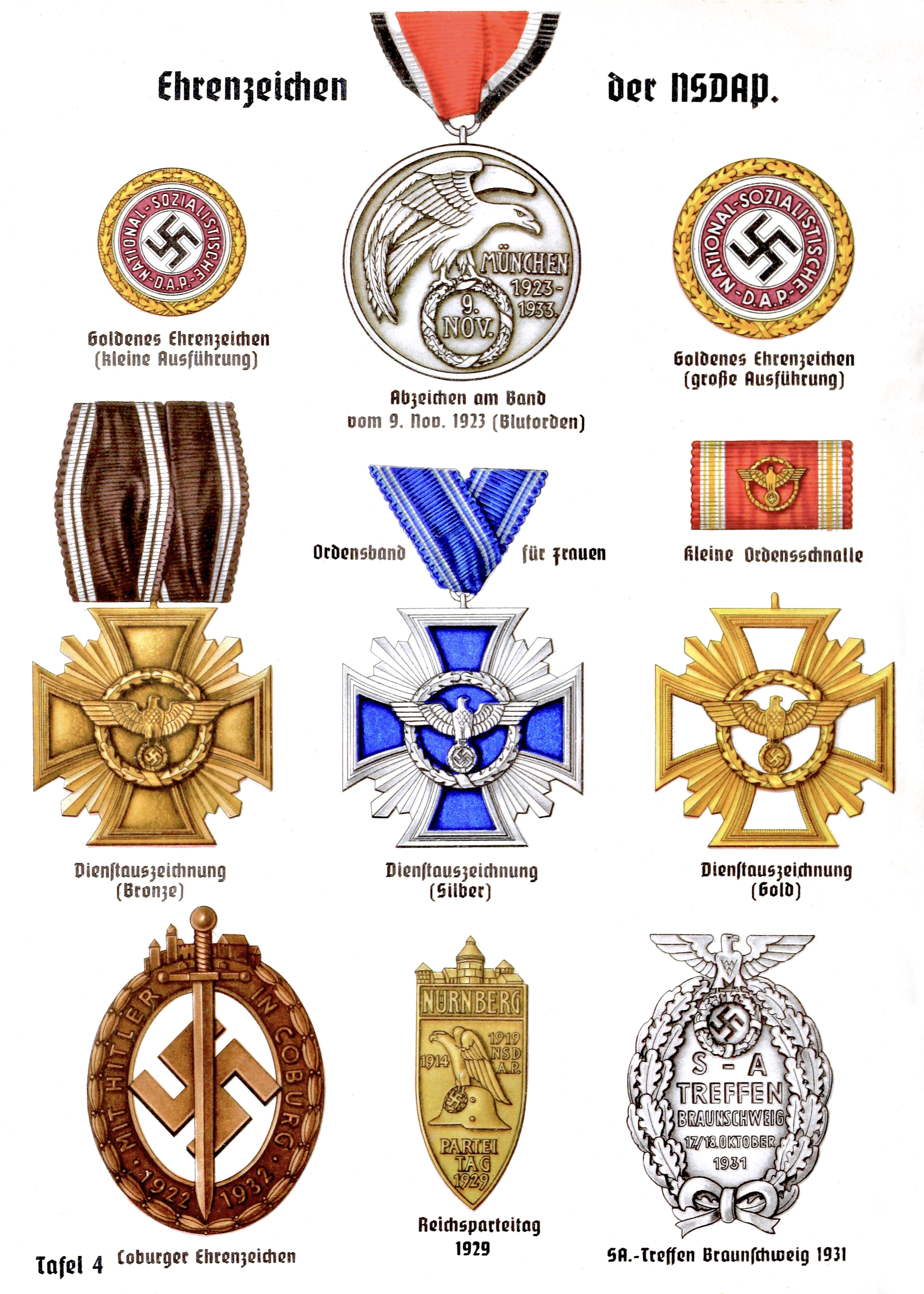
Decorations of the NSDAP. Plate from Organisationsbuch der NSDAP, 1943 * Golden Party Badge, small version for wear on suit jacket; Blood Order; Golden Party Badge, large version for wear in uniform* Nazi Party Long Service Award (bronze, silver with women's ribbon, gold with ribbon bar);* Coburg Badge; Nuremberg Party Day Badge; Brunswick Rally Badge

Medals and awards were issued by the National Socialist German Workers' Party (NSDAP) in Nazi Germany between 1920 and 1945. Political awards were authorised for wear on any paramilitary uniform, as well as civilian attire, but were generally discouraged (but not forbidden) on Wehrmacht military uniforms. The Waffen-SS freely wore both political awards and military decorations on their uniforms.

Civil decorations were considered the lowest order of medals, after military decorations and political decorations of the Nazi Party. Civil decorations were authorised for display on civilian clothing and paramilitary uniforms of the Nazi Party; however, their wear was often prohibited on active duty military uniforms of the Wehrmacht; the notable exception to this were sports badges, which were granted the same status as military qualification awards.

The public wear of all Nazi Party awards was banned in Germany after 1945.

== Political decorations ==
The various degrees of Nazi Party decorations were as follows:

The German Order
(Awarded with and without Swords)

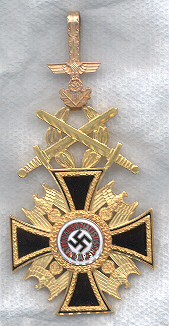

Golden Party Badge

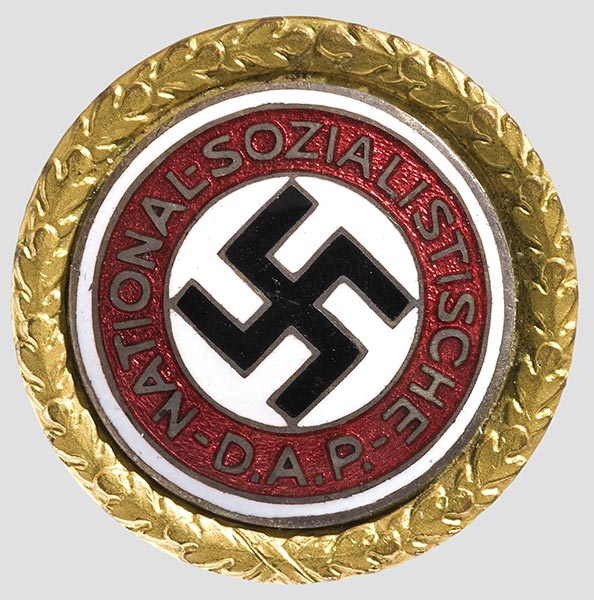

The Blood Order

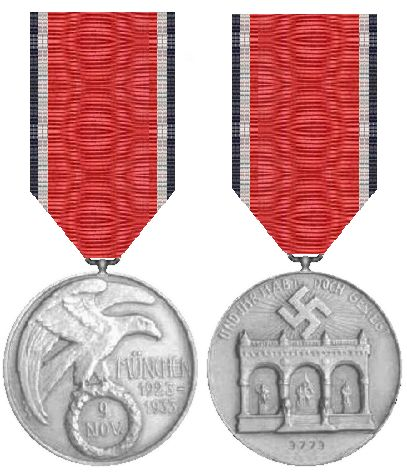

== German Order ==
This was the highest award that the Nazi Party could bestow on an individual. Adolf Hitler regarded this award as his personal decoration to be bestowed only upon those whose services to the state, party, and the people, he deemed worthy. There were eleven confirmed recipients of this award between 1942 and 1945.

== Golden Party Badge ==
The first 100,000 members who had joined and had uninterrupted service in the Nazi Party were given the right to wear the Golden Party Badge (Goldenes Parteiabzeichen), shown above. Those badges had the recipient's membership number on the back (Adolf Hitler had badge #7). Other Golden Party Badges (with the initials A.H. on the back) were awarded at the discretion of Hitler to certain members of the party who merited special attention. An identical badge was awarded each year on 30 January to persons who had shown outstanding service to the Party or State.

== Blood Order medal ==
The Blood Order (German: Blutorden), officially known as the "Decoration in Memory (of the Munich putsch) of 9 November 1923" (Medaille zur Erinnerung an den 9. November 1923), authorised by Hitler in March 1934, was one of the most prestigious decorations in the Nazi Party.

== Party awards ==
- Coburg Badge (1922)
- Nuremberg Party Day Badge (1929)
- Brunswick Rally Badge (1931)
- Frontbann Badge
- Danzig Cross (awarded in 1st and 2nd class)
- Nazi Party Long Service Award: Given in three grades; awarded for 10, 15, and 25 years of service
- Honour Chevron for the Old Guard: Designated those who joined the Party before Hitler became Chancellor. It was worn on the right sleeve.

The leaders of Nazi political districts (known as the Gauleiter) were empowered to bestow Gau badges for a variety of services rendered to the local political organisation. The badges were issued in silver and gold, with some in bronze. They were rarely issued in gold with diamonds.

In November 1936, Hitler gave new "orders" as to the "Orders and Awards" of the Nazi Party to be bestowed. The top NSDAP awards are listed in the order: 1. Coburg Badge; 2. Nuremberg Party Day Badge; 3. Brunswick Rally Badge; 4. Golden Party Badge; 5. The Blood Order; followed by the Gau badges and the Golden Hitler Youth Badge.

== SS and police decorations ==
- Police Long Service Award
- SS Chevron for Former Police and Military
- SS Honour Sword
- SS Julleuchter
- SS Long Service Award
- SS Membership Runes for Order Police
- SS Zivilabzeichen
- Totenkopf Ring

=== Germanic SS decorations ===
Awards specific to individual nationalistic Germanic SS organisations were as follows:

- Germanic Proficiency Runes (bronze and silver)
- SS Sports Badge (Netherlands)
- SS Honor Sports Badge (Netherlands)
- Brave and Faithful Order (Norway)
- Førergarde Membership Badge (Norway)
- Front Fighters Badge (Norway)
- Mussert Cross (Netherlands)
- Mussert-Garde Commemorative Pin (Netherlands)
- Schalburg Cross (Denmark)
- State Police Honor Cross (Norway)
- W.A. Sports Badge (Netherlands)

== SA decorations ==
- SA Sports Badge (bronze, silver, and gold)
- Service Entry Badge of Der Stahlhelm, Bund der Frontsoldaten

== NSFK decorations ==
- Free Balloon Pilot Badge
- Motor Aircraft Pilot Badge (Das Abzeichen für Motorflugzeugführer)
- Large Glider Flyer Badge (Das Große Segelfliegerabzeichen)

== Hitler Youth decorations ==
Hitler Youth awards were as follows:

- Hitler Youth Badge (including versions in gold and with oak leaves)
- Hitler Youth Badge for Distinguished Foreigners
- Hitler Youth Leader's Sports Badge
- Hitler Youth Proficiency Badge
- Hitler Youth shooting badges

== Other German sports decorations ==
- German Olympic Decoration (awarded in 1st and 2nd class)
- German Sports Badge
- Horseman's Badge
- Horse Driver's Badge

== Civil awards ==
- Badge for the Academy of Aeronautical Research
- Civil Defence Decoration (awarded in 1st and 2nd class)
- Cross of Honour of the German Mother (bronze, silver, and gold)
- Faithful Service Medal (gold, silver, and special class)
- Fire Brigade Decoration (awarded in 1st and 2nd class)
- German National Prize for Art and Science
- Goethe Medallion for Art and Science
- Lifesaving Medallion
- National Food Estate Medallion
- National Senate of Culture Badge
- Mine Rescue Medal
- Social Welfare Decoration (awarded in 1st, 2nd, and 3rd class)
- Medal of Social Welfare
- War Merit Medal

== Diplomatic awards ==
- Grand Cross of the Order of the German Eagle
- Special Grade Order of the German Eagle
- Order of the German Eagle (five classes)
- Medal of the Order of the German Eagle (bronze and silver)

All German Eagle decorations were awarded both with and without swords and could be upgraded to a gold version and also gold with diamonds. The German Eagle was intended as an award for foreigners while the Special Grade (without degree) was awarded to Germans.

== Labor and trade decorations ==
- Customs Service Decoration
- Defence Economy Leader's Badge
- Fritz Todt Award
- Labour Service Ribbon (for 25, 18, 12, and 4 years of service)
- Pioneer of Labor Award
- Reichsberufswettkampf

== German Red Cross awards ==
- German Red Cross Decoration (awarded in four classes)
- German Red Cross Medal
