= Service award =

A Service award was awarded by a country to a soldier or civilian for long service. It is comparable to a service medal but can be awarded to civilians as well as soldiers.

== Germany ==
=== Kingdom of Bavaria ===
- Königliches Ludwigsorden for 50 years' service.
- Service Award Cross, first and second class for 40 or 24 years' service - officers, doctors and officials received the cross of both classes, but teams were also awarded first class.

=== Nazi Germany ===
The Nazi Party (NSDAP) awarded the NSDAP-Dienstauszeichnung (Nazi Party Long Service Award) for 25 (Gold), 15 (Silver) and 10 (Bronze) years' service, while the SS awarded a separate SS-Dienstauszeichnung for 4, 8, 12 and 25 years of service.

The Wehrmacht awarded the 4-class Dienstauszeichnung for 4 (silver medal); 12 (gold medal); 18 (silver cross) and 25 (gold cross) years' service, with oak leaves on the first class for 40 years.

Similarly there was a Loyal Service Medal for active members of the German police or "an administrator" in the police service known as the Polizei Dienstauszeichnung. In addition there was a Service Award for Public Work.

== Austrian Empire ==
From 1849 it awarded a cross made out of cannon-metal for military service.

== Sources ==
- Angolia, John (1989). For Führer and Fatherland: Political & Civil Awards of the Third Reich. R. James Bender Publishing. ISBN 978-0912138169.
