= Faithful Service Medal =

Nazi military award

The Faithful Service Medals were part of the civil decorations of Nazi Germany.

== Description ==
The Faithful Service Medal (Treudienst-Ehrenzeichen für Beamte Angestellte und Arbeiter) was founded on 30 January 1938 in two classes and one class to reward civilians in the employ of the public services, and exceptional cases of private concerns, for long and faithful service.

All officials, employees, and laborers at any level of the public service (local, regional or national) who completed 25 or more years of service were eligible for The Civil Service Faithful Service Medal in Silver (Treudienst-Ehrenzeichen für Beamte Angestellte und Arbeiter im öffentlichen Dienst Stufe in Silber).

All officials, employees, and laborers at any level of the public service (local, regional or national) who completed 40 or more years' service were eligible for The Civil Service Faithful Service Medal in Gold (Treudienst-Ehrenzeichen für Beamte Angestellte und Arbeiter im öffentlichen Dienst Stufe in Gold).

All officials, employees, and laborers of private concerns who completed 50 or more years of service were eligible for, a special class of the award, The Employee and Worker Faithful Service Medal (Treudienst-Ehrenzeichen für Angestellte und Arbeiter der freien Wirtschaft).

== See also ==
- Civil Service Faithful Service Medal
