= Heinrich Bennecke =

German Nazi SA general (1902–1972)

Führer, SA-Gruppe Südmark
- In office 1 December 1944 – 8 May 1945
- Preceded by: Walther Nibbe
- Succeeded by: Position abolished

Führer, SA-Gruppe Pommern
- In office 1 January 1937 – 30 November 1944
- Preceded by: Hans Friedrich
- Succeeded by: Walther Nibbe

Führer, Reichsführerschule der SA
- In office 31 July 1934 – 31 December 1936
- Preceded by: Kurt Kühme
- Succeeded by: Max Luyken

Führer, Reich SA-Hochschulamt Supreme SA Leadership (OSAF)
- In office 15 September 1933 – 1 March 1934

Additional positions
- 1937–1944: Prussian Provincial Councilor
- 1936–1945: Reichstag Deputy
- 1930–1933: Landtag of Saxony Deputy

Personal details
- Born: Hans Heinrich Bennecke; 8 February 1902 Dresden, Kingdom of Saxony, German Empire
- Died: 30 January 1972 (aged 69) Stuttgart, Baden-Württemberg, West Germany
- Party: Nazi Party
- Education: Ph.D. (1930)
- Alma mater: Technische Hochschule Dresden; Technische Hochschule München; University of Leipzig
- Occupation: Soldier
- Civilian awards: Blood Order; Golden Party Badge; Coburg Badge

Military service
- Allegiance: Weimar Republic; Nazi Germany
- Branch/service: Freikorps; Reichswehr; German Army
- Years of service: 1920–1923; 1939–1943
- Rank: Hauptmann of reserves
- Unit: Reichswehr Regiment 23
- Battles/wars: Third Silesian Uprising; World War II; Invasion of Poland; Battle of France
- Military awards: Iron Cross, 2nd class War Merit Cross, 1st and 2nd class

Heinrich Bennecke (8 February 1902 – 30 January 1972) was a German member of the Sturmabteilung (SA), the Nazi Party's paramilitary organization, who became an SA-Obergruppenführer and held many high-level commands in the Supreme SA Leadership (OSAF) in Nazi Germany. He was also a Nazi Party politician who was a deputy in the Landtag of Saxony and in the Reichstag. He served as a military officer in the Second World War and became an historian in West Germany during the post-war era.

== Early life and education ==
Heinrich Bennecke was born in Dresden, the son of a physician who also served as the senior medical officer in an Imperial German Army division. Bennecke was educated in the local public school and Realgymnasium. Imbued with a sense of patriotism and love of the military from an early age, he worked from 1917 as a voluntary harvest worker during the First World War to replace the soldiers at the front. In 1919, while still a student, he joined the part-time volunteer regiment of the city of Dresden, a reserve force to be used to quell civic unrest.

The next year, Bennecke could finally join the military at age 18, enrolling in Reichswehr Regiment 23. From May to June 1921, he fought with the Freikorps Haßfurther in Upper Silesia against Polish insurgents during the Third Silesian Uprising. After obtaining his Abitur in 1921, Bennecke studied economics and political science at the Dresden Technische Hochschule (today, TU Dresden) and the Technische Hochschule München (today, Technical University of Munich) until 1923.

== Career in the Sturmabteilung and the Nazi Party ==
Bennecke joined the Nazi Party Ortsgruppe (local group) in Munich in May 1922. As a very early Party member (membership number 4,840) he would later be awarded the Golden Party Badge. He also joined the Party's paramilitary organization, the SA, at the same time. He was assigned to the SA regiment in Munich, commanded by Wilhelm Brückner, who would later become Adolf Hitler's chief adjutant. Bennecke worked as a part-time assistant in the regiment's business office and became the regimental adjutant in 1923. As a participant in Hitler's rally in Coburg on 14 October 1922, Bennicke would later be awarded the Coburg Badge. On 9 November 1923, he participated with his regiment in Hitler's failed Beer Hall Putsch in Munich, for which he later would be decorated with the Blood Order. After the collapse of the putsch, he was dismissed from the army and was expelled from Bavaria.

Returning to Dresden, Bennecke worked as a shop assistant in a paper business. While the Party and the SA were banned in the aftermath of the putsch, he was active as a Zugführer (platoon leader) with the Frontbann, an SA front organization. Following the lifting of the ban on the Party, Bennecke rejoined it on 15 May 1925. He led his entire Frontbann unit to enroll in the Großdeutsche Jugend, a völkisch youth organization that was the forerunner of the Hitler Youth. He was the leader of this organization for eastern Saxony from July to December 1926. In April 1926, he enrolled as a student in the University of Leipzig to study history, journalism and philosophy. For the next two years, he was a member of the National Socialist German Students' League.

In July 1927, Bennecke joined the SA once again, and at age twenty-five was appointed Führer of SA-Standarte IV in Leipzig. In September 1929, he became the adjutant to Deputy Supreme SA Leader-Center, Manfred Freiherr von Killinger. At the same time, he was named the editor of the Sächsischen Beobachter (Saxon Observer) the official newspaper of Gau Saxony. In May 1930, he stood for political office and was elected to the Landtag of Saxony where he would serve until its dissolution in October 1933. In June 1930, he finished his academic career when he received his doctorate from the University of Leipzig. He then moved back to Dresden and entered full-time SA service as the Führer of SA-Brigade IV. Also in 1930, he became the Gau press officer and editor of the Nazi daily newspaper Der Freiheitskampf (The Freedom Struggle).

Bennecke then held a series of SA field commands in Dresden, as Führer of SA-Standarte 5 from July through December 1931, SA-Standarte 100 through February 1932, SA-Untergruppe Dresden through February 1933, and SA-Brigade 33 to September 1933. On 15 September 1933, he entered the Supreme SA Leadership (OSAF) as the Führer of the newly-established Reich SA-Hochschulamt (SA Higher Education Office). This office was responsible for training German university students mentally and physically, with ideological indoctrination and vigorous physical exercise. He remaining in this post until 1 March 1934 and, at the end of July 1934, he became the Führer of the Reichsführerschule der SA in Munich where all SA leaders received leadership training and ideological indoctrination.

On 29 March 1936, Bennecke was elected as a deputy of the Reichstag from electoral constituency 18 (South Westphalia). In April 1938, he was returned as a deputy from constituency 6 (Pomerania) and served there until the fall of the Nazi regime. On 1 January 1937, he left the Reichsführerschule for a new field command as Führer of SA-Gruppe Pommern, in command of all SA units in Pomerania. He was also appointed to the Provincial Council for Prussian Province of Pomerania. On 1 December 1944, he was transferred from Pomerania to become Führer of SA-Gruppe Südmark, commanding all SA units in Reichsgau Styria and headquartered in Graz. This was his final SA command, and he remained in that post until Germany's surrender in May 1945.

=== SA ranks ===
SA ranks
| Date | Rank |
|---|---|
| 10 July 1927 | SA-Standartenführer |
| 1 July 1932 | SA-Oberführer |
| 1 July 1933 | SA-Brigadeführer |
| 1 March 1934 | SA-Gruppenführer |
| 9 November 1937 | SA-Obergruppenführer |

== Military service in the Second World War ==
Bennecke participated in military training exercises with the German Army in 1938 and 1939. On the outbreak of the Second World War, he entered active-duty military service as a Leutnant of reserves and saw action in the campaigns in Poland and France. In June 1941, he was considered for an appointment as a Generalkommissar in the Reichskommissariat Ukraine but did not receive this post. When he left the military in 1943, he held the rank of Hauptmann and had been awarded the Iron Cross, 2nd class, and the War Merit Cross, 1st and 2nd class.

== Post-war life ==
After 1945, Bennecke worked as a historian, primarily for the Institute for Contemporary History in Munich. He wrote one of the standard works on the SA. He also wrote other books covering the period of the Weimar Republic and Nazi Germany, and he taught several classes at the Munich School of Politics and Public Policy from 1968. He died in Stuttgart in January 1972.

== Writings ==
- Hitler und die SA (1962)
- Die Reichswehr und der Röhm-Putsch (1964)
- Wirtschaftliche Depression und politischer Radikalismus 1918–1938 (1970)

== Sources ==
- Campbell, Bruce (1998). The SA Generals and the Rise of Nazism. Lexington: University Press of Kentucky. ISBN 978-0-813-12047-8.
- Heinrich Bennecke entry in the Sächsische Biographie
- Information about Heinrich Bennecke in the Reichstag database
- Miller, Michael D.; Schulz, Andreas (2015). Leaders of the Storm Troops. Vol. 1. Solihull, England: Helion & Company. ISBN 978-1-909-98287-1.
- Siemens, Daniel (2017). Stormtroopers: A New History of Hitler's Brownshirts. New Haven: Yale University Press. ISBN 978-0-300-19681-8.
- Stockhorst, Erich (1985). 5000 Köpfe: Wer War Was im 3. Reich. Arndt. p. 51. ISBN 978-3-887-41116-9.
