= Martin Mutschmann =

German politician and war criminal (1879–1947)

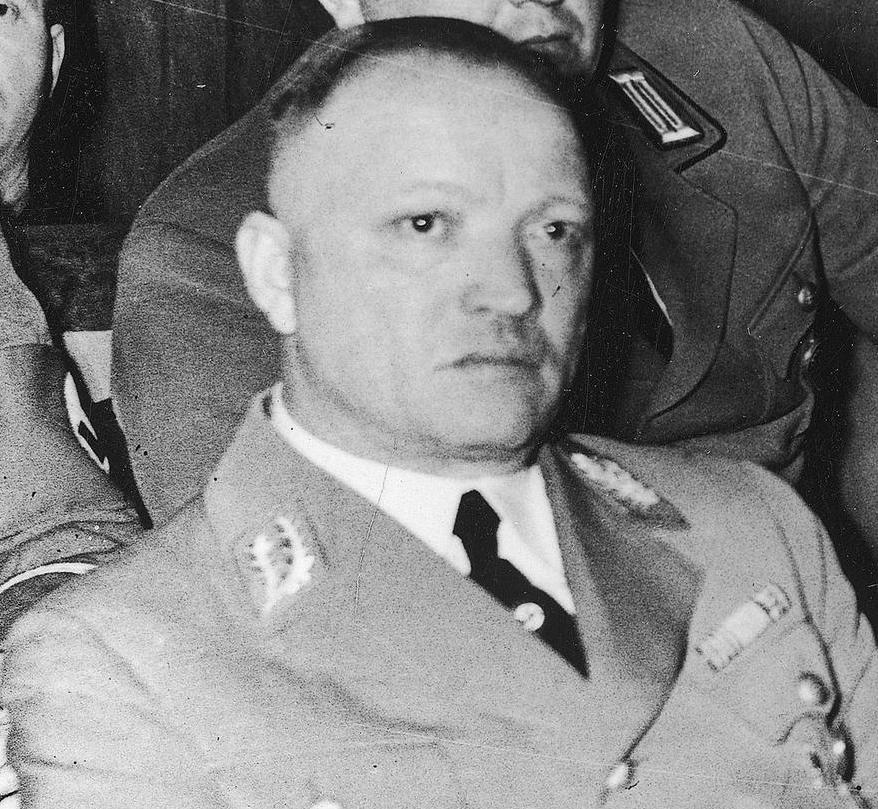
- Mutschmann in 1937

Gauleiter of Gau Saxony
- In office 27 March 1925 – 8 May 1945
- Preceded by: Position created
- Succeeded by: Position abolished

Reichsstatthalter of Saxony
- In office 5 May 1933 – 8 May 1945
- Prime Minister: Manfred Freiherr von Killinger
- Preceded by: Position created
- Succeeded by: Position abolished

Minister-President of Saxony
- In office 28 February 1935 – 8 May 1945
- Preceded by: Manfred Freiherr von Killinger
- Succeeded by: Rudolf Friedrichs

Personal details
- Born: 9 March 1879 Hirschberg, Principality of Reuss-Gera, German Empire
- Died: 14 February 1947 (aged 67) Moscow, Russian SFSR, Soviet Union
- Cause of death: Execution by shooting
- Party: National Socialist German Workers' Party (NSDAP)
- Other political affiliations: Deutschvölkischer Schutz und Trutzbund; National Socialist Freedom Movement
- Occupation: Factory owner

Military service
- Allegiance: German Empire
- Branch/service: Imperial German Army
- Years of service: 1914–1916
- Rank: Gefreiter
- Unit: Reserve Infantry Regiment 133
- Battles/wars: World War I: Western Front
- Awards: Iron Cross, 2nd class

Martin Mutschmann (9 March 1879 – 14 February 1947) was a German factory owner who was a financial supporter of the Nazi Party and became the Gauleiter (Regional Leader) and Reichsstatthalter (Reich Governor) of the state of Saxony during Nazi Germany. At the end of the Second World War, he was captured, put on trial, sentenced to death and executed in the Soviet Union.

== Early life ==
Born in Hirschberg on the Saale in the Principality of Reuss-Gera, Germany, Mutschmann moved while he was young with his family to Plauen in Saxony. He served an apprenticeship as an embroiderer and from 1896 to 1901 was employed as a master embroiderer, department head and warehouse director in lace and linen factories in Plauen, Herford and Köln. That was followed by military service from 1901 to 1903, after which he returned to employment in the Plauen Lace Factory (Plauener Spitzenfabriken). He established his own lace factory, Mutschmann & Eisentraut, in Plauen in October 1907. During World War I, he volunteered for service with Reserve Infantry Regiment 133 and served on the Western Front until he was severely wounded in April 1916. He was awarded the Iron Cross, 2nd class, was discharged from the Imperial German Army as unfit for field service on 24 December 1916 and resumed the direction of his factory in Plauen.

After the war, he was an early participant in the nationalist and antisemitic Deutschvölkischer Schutz und Trutzbund. He joined the Nazi Party (NSDAP) in April 1922, was a founding member of the local branch (Ortsgruppe) in Plauen and made personal donations of capital to the NSDAP. Mutschmann lost his lace business in the Great Depression, but he continued to solicit donations from other businesses. His fundraising skills found favour with the NSDAP, and with Adolf Hitler whom he visited in Landsberg prison. During the period when the NSDAP was banned in the wake of the failed Beer Hall Putsch, Mutschmann succeeded Fritz Tittmann as the leader in Saxony of the National Socialist Freedom Movement (NSFB), a Nazi front organization, taking over at the NSFB party congress, 16–17 August 1924.

== Nazi Party career ==
After the NSDAP was re-established in 1925, Mutschmann was appointed Landesleiter (later Gauleiter) of Saxony on 27 March 1925, maintaining that position until the fall of the Nazi regime. He formally re-enrolled in the NSDAP on 2 June 1925 (Party membership number 35). Generally his political activity concentrated on Saxony rather than on Germany as a whole. Mutschmann was passionately interested in the preservation of Saxon arts and crafts. In the September 1930 parliamentary election, he was elected to the Reichstag for electoral constituency 30, Chemnitz-Zwickau, a seat he would hold until the collapse of the Nazi regime in May 1945. Around 1930 he also became the editor of a Nazi daily newspaper, Der Freiheitskampf (The Freedom Struggle). On 15 July 1932 came his appointment as Landesinspekteur. In this position, he had oversight responsibility for his Gau and that of Thuringia. This was a short-lived initiative by Gregor Strasser to centralize control over the Gaue. However, it was unpopular with the Gauleiters and was repealed on Strasser's fall from power in December 1932. Mutschmann then returned to his Gauleiter position in Saxony.

After the Nazi seizure of power, Mutschmann was appointed Reichsstatthalter (Reich Governor) of Saxony on 5 May 1933. A passionate hunter, he was the Gaujägermeister (Hunting Master) of Saxony on 10 September 1934. He was often accused of being more interested in his hobby than the welfare of Saxony. On 28 February 1935, he also became the Minister-President of Saxony, displacing his rival, Manfred Freiherr von Killinger, who was purged in 1934 in the aftermath of the Night of the Long Knives. Mutschmann was one of only a few Gauleiters, to simultaneously occupy both the Reichsstatthalter and Minister-President positions. On 4 September 1935, he was made a member of Hans Frank's Academy for German Law. On 9 November 1937, he was promoted to SA-Obergruppenführer.

== Second World War and death ==
When the war began on 1 September 1939, Mutschmann was appointed the Reich Defense Commissioner for Wehrkreis (Military District) IV that included his Gau as well as Gau Halle-Merseburg, northern Reichsgau Sudetenland and part of Gau Thuringia. On 16 November 1942, the jurisdiction of the Reich Defense Commissioners was changed from the Wehrkreis to the Gau level, and he remained Commissioner only for Gau Saxony. On 25 September 1944, he became the commander of the Nazi Volkssturm forces in Saxony. As Reich Defense Commissioner, Mutschmann had responsibility for air and civil defense measures and was blamed for not adequately preparing for the bombing of Dresden which occurred from 13–15 February 1945.

On 14 April 1945 he declared Dresden a "fortress" city. On 1 May in Dresden, he insisted that the city go into public mourning after the suicide of German dictator Adolf Hitler on 30 April 1945. On 5 May, Mutschmann falsely announced that a large-scale German offensive on the Eastern Front was about to be launched. On 8 May as Dresden was occupied by the Red Army, Mutschmann fled the city. Moving to Oberwiesenthal and then to Tellerhäuser, he hid out until arrested by police on 17 May. He was displayed in the town square and subjected to public ridicule. Handed over to the NKVD, he was imprisoned in the Lubyanka prison in Moscow, tried by the Military Collegium of the Supreme Court of the Soviet Union and sentenced to death on 30 January 1947. He was shot on 14 February 1947.

== Awards and decorations ==
- 1914 Iron Cross 2nd Class
- 1918 Wound Badge in Black, c.1918
- 1922 Coburg Badge, October 1932
- Golden Party Badge, 1933
- Anschluss Medal, c.1938
- Sudetenland Medal, c.1939
- Honour Chevron for the Old Guard
- SA Sports Badge

== See also ==
- 1925 German presidential election
- 1932 German presidential election
- Machtergreifung - "Seizure of Power" - 30 January 1933
- Bombing of Dresden in World War II
- List of Gauleiters
- Ehrenburger Johanngeorgenstadt
