= Fritz Tittmann =

Nazi Party official and SS general (1898–1945)

Führer, Untergau Zwickau
- In office 1926 – December 1927

Deputy Landesleiter of Saxony
- In office August 1925 – 1926

Landesleiter of Saxony
- In office 11 October 1921 – 9 November 1923
- Preceded by: Position created
- Succeeded by: Position abolished

Additional positions
- 1933–1945: Reichstag Deputy
- 1932–1933: Landtag of Prussia Deputy
- 1926–1929: Landtag of Saxony Deputy
- 1924: Reichstag Deputy

Personal details
- Born: 18 July 1898 Leipzig, Kingdom of Saxony, German Empire
- Died: 25 April 1945 (aged 46) Treuenbrietzen, Nazi Germany
- Party: Nazi Party
- Other political affiliations: Deutschvölkischer Schutz und Trutzbund; Völkisch-Social Bloc; National Socialist Freedom Movement
- Occupation: Machinist; Editor
- Civilian awards: Coburg Badge; Golden Party Badge

Military service
- Allegiance: German Empire; Weimar Republic; Nazi Germany
- Branch/service: Royal Saxon Army; Reichswehr; Schutzstaffel
- Years of service: 1914–1920; 1938–1945
- Rank: Unteroffizier; SS-Brigadeführer
- Unit: Infantry Regiment 105 (6th Royal Saxon)
- Commands: SS and Police Leader, "Nikolajew"
- Battles/wars: World War I World War II
- Military awards: Iron Cross, 1st and 2nd class Wound Badge in Silver

Fritz Tittmann (18 July 1898 – 25 April 1945) was a German politician and SS-Brigadeführer who served as an early Nazi Party leader in Saxony. He also was a Reichstag deputy throughout the years of Nazi Germany. From 1941 to 1942, he was the SS and Police Leader in Nikolajew (today, Mykolaiv) during the time of the Holocaust murders in Ukraine. He died near the end of the Second World War in unclear circumstances.

== Early life ==
Tittmann was born in Leipzig, attended Volksschule there, followed by an apprenticeship in locksmithing. He then studied mechanical engineering at a vocational school in Chemnitz and worked briefly as a machinist from 1913 to 1914. Shortly after the outbreak of the First World War, he joined the Royal Saxon Army on 21 September 1914. He served in the 105th Infantry Regiment (6th Royal Saxon) "King William II of Württemberg" throughout the war. Serving on the western front, he was wounded three times and was awarded the Iron Cross 1st and 2nd class and the Wound Badge in silver. Hospitalized in Zwickau from April 1918, he remained in the peacetime Reichswehr until 31 August 1920 when he was discharged on a partial disability pension with the rank of Unteroffizier. Returning to civilian life, he underwent retraining to become a commercial clerk. He was employed between 1920 and 1921 as a business manager and editor for the Deutschvölkischer Schutz- und Trutzbund, the largest, most active and influential antisemitic organization in Germany. He then secured a job as a swimming instructor for the city of Zwickau between 1921 and 1923.

== Nazi Party career ==
In July 1921, Tittmann attended a Nazi Party meeting in Munich where Adolf Hitler spoke, and he joined the Party. As an early Party member, he would later receive the Golden Party Badge. On 11 October 1921, he co-founded an Ortsgruppe (local group) in Zwickau. This was the first Nazi organization formed outside Bavaria. On the same day, he was named Landesleiter (state leader, equivalent to the later position of Gauleiter) for Saxony, and he set about organizing and expanding the Party throughout the state. In October 1922, Tittmann attended the large rally in Coburg led by Hitler, and later was awarded the Coburg Badge, the Party's highest national award. Sometime in 1923, Tittmann founded a publishing house which published the weekly (after 1932, daily) newspaper Der Streiter (The Fighter), in which he wrote pro-Nazi propaganda articles.

Tittmann was also the leader of the Sturmabteilung (SA), the Party's paramilitary organization, for Saxony, Thuringia and Upper Franconia. He devoted himself to the military training of the SA to support Hitler's Bavarian forces in preparation for the expected putsch against the Weimar Republic. In September 1923, Tittmann moved his SA headquarters to Hof just over the border in Bavaria.

Following the failed Beer Hall Putsch of 9 November 1923 and the subsequent outlawing of the Nazi Party, Tittmann founded the Zwickau branch of the Völkisch-Social Bloc, a Nazi front organization, and served as its leader in Saxony until August 1924 when he was replaced by Martin Mutschmann. During this period, Tittmann also led units of the Frontbann, in place of the banned SA. In the parliamentary election in May 1924, he was elected on the National Socialist Freedom Party (NSFP) electoral list as a deputy to the Reichstag, serving until the dissolution of October 1924.

After the Nazi Party was re-founded, Tittmann enrolled on 25 July 1925 (membership number 12,225). He served as Deputy Landesleiter of Saxony under Mutschmann from August 1925. Then, from 1926 to December 1927, he served under Mutschmann as leader of the Untergau Zwickau. From October 1926 to May 1929, he and Hellmuth von Mücke sat in the Landtag of Saxony as the first two members of the Nazi Party in a German parliament. Tittmann was again a member of the SA from 1925 and, as an SA-Standartenführer, led the Zwickau SA-Standarte from 1927 to 1930. In 1930, he moved to Brandenburg and left the SA to enroll in the SS (membership number 3,925), serving until 1931 as SS-Standartenfuhrer for Brandenburg-Süd. From April 1932 to its dissolution in October 1933, he was a deputy of the Landtag of Prussia and, from 1932 to 1936, the Gau Inspector in Gau Kurmark.

After the Nazi seizure of power, Tittmann was elected first deputy Burgermeister (mayor) of Treuenbrietzen in March 1933, was appointed acting Burgermeister by the Reich minister of the interior in April 1934 and, from 1935 to 1941, he served as honorary Burgermeister. In 1935, Zwickau awarded him an honorary citizenship. From September 1933 to May 1936, he was the Reich Representative of the Party for Gaue Berlin, Kurmark and Silesia and, from May 1934, served on the staff of Deputy Führer Rudolf Hess. At the Nuremberg rallies of 1933 and 1934, Tittmann held the position of press chief. Elected as a Reichstag deputy in November 1933 from electoral constituency 4 (Potsdam I), he retained this seat until the end of the Nazi regime.

On 20 April 1938, Tittmann rejoined the SS with the rank of SS-Oberführer. He served in the office of the Reichsführer-SS Heinrich Himmler. There, he was made the plenipotentiary for ethnic German issues, and the SS Ethnic German Main Office (VoMi) representative to the Reich Organization Leadership Office, headed by Robert Ley. On 7 October 1939, Himmler was named Reich Commissioner for the Consolidation of German Nationhood (RKFDV) and created a new SS office for this function. On 9 November 1940, Tittmann was promoted to SS-Brigadeführer and, on 1 July 1941, Himmler charged him with responsibility for representing the ethnic German interests of both VoMi and RKFDV to Ley's office.

== Second World War ==
After the German attack on the Soviet Union, Tittmann underwent training in police duties and, on 22 October 1941, was appointed the first SS and Police Leader (SSPF) for Nikolajew in the Reichskommissariat Ukraine. During the winter of 1941–1942, he was involved in recruiting ethnic German deserters, mostly from Romanian units, for a new Waffen-SS unit then being formed (7th SS Volunteer Mountain Division Prinz Eugen). By May 1942, he had enlisted around 1,000 soldiers and, though these recruits were described as "volunteers", they were often forcibly coerced into service. On 22 August 1942, Tittmann was replaced in Nikolajew by SS-Brigadeführer Waldemar Wappenhans, and was reassigned to the staff of the Higher SS and Police Leader (HSSPF) for "Russland-Süd," SS-Obergruppenführer Hans-Adolf Prützmann, in Kiev.

Although Tittmann's tenure in Nikolajew only began after the Nikolaev massacre of September 1941, it coincided with the so-called "second wave" of Holocaust murders.

By the spring of 1942 almost no Jews remained alive in German-occupied Right-Bank and Left-Bank Ukraine. Meanwhile, in western Ukraine the perpetrators started classifying and organizing the surviving Jews according to their presumed ability to work. As a result, the murder of women and children intensified … In Volhynia, Podilia, and the Mykolaiv region, mass executions were restarted at almost the same time. All the Jews in the latter region were killed by 1 April. The most apocalyptic period was yet to come. In July 1942 approximately 600,000 Jews were still alive in Ukraine. Most of them fell victim to the extreme murder campaign that took place between July and November 1942. Almost every day German police, aided by Ukrainian auxiliary policemen, killed thousands of Jews, especially in August and September 1942.

In September 1944, Tittmann's career was derailed when he received a severe reprimand from Himmler for having diverted three Waffen-SS personnel away from their official duties to assist him with personal matters. In the same month, he was punitively transferred to northern Italy, where he was to supervise the construction of defensive positions.

Tittmann died on 25 April 1945 in Treuenbrietzen. There are differing accounts of his death. One version is that he was killed in action fighting the Red Army. Another is that he perished with his family in an air raid. According to another source, Tittmann killed his wife, three children, sister-in-law, mother-in-law and himself in a murder–suicide, rather than surrender to the advancing Red Army.

== See also ==
- Holocaust in Ukraine
- Volksdeutsche

== Sources ==
- Fritz Tittmann in Online Saxon Biography
- Höffkes, Karl (1986). Hitlers Politische Generale. Die Gauleiter des Dritten Reiches: ein biographisches Nachschlagewerk. Tübingen: Grabert-Verlag. ISBN 3-87847-163-7.
- Information about Fritz Tittmann in the Reichstag database
- Miller, Michael D.; Schulz, Andreas (2021). Gauleiter: The Regional Leaders of the Nazi Party and Their Deputies, 1925–1945. Vol. 3 (Fritz Sauckel – Hans Zimmermann). Fonthill Media. ISBN 978-1-781-55826-3.
- Schiffer Publishing Ltd., ed. (2000). SS Officers List: SS-Standartenführer to SS-Oberstgruppenführer (As of 30 January 1942). Schiffer Military History Publishing. ISBN 0-7643-1061-5.
- Szejnmann, Claus-Christian (1999). Nazism in Central Germany: The Brownshirts in 'Red' Saxony. Berghahn Books. ISBN 978-1-571-81942-0.
- Williamson, Gordon (1994). The SS:Hitler's Instrument of Terror. Amber Books. ISBN 978-1-907-44656-6.
- Yerger, Mark C. (1997). The Allgemeine-SS: The Commands, Units and Leaders of the General SS. Schiffer Publishing Ltd. ISBN 0-7643-0145-4.
