= Coburg Badge =

Nazi Party award

Coburg Badge Das Coburger Abzeichen
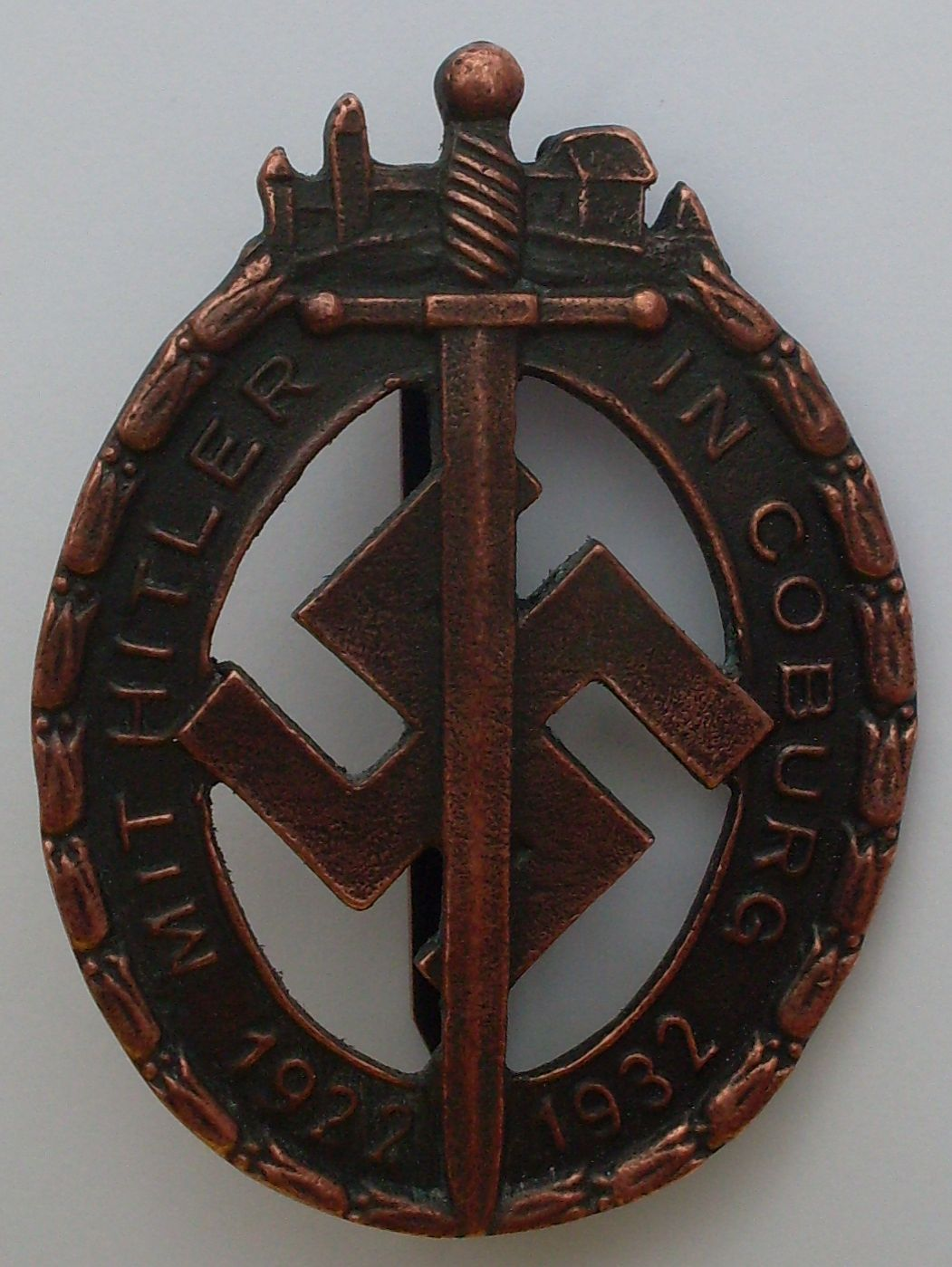
- Coburg Badge
- Country: Nazi Germany
- Presented by: Nazi Party
- Eligibility: Deutscher Tag in Coburg participants
- Motto: MIT HITLER IN COBURG 1922-1932
- Status: Obsolete, illegal
- Established: 14 October 1932

Highlights
- Total recipients: 436

Precedence
- Next (higher): None
- Next (lower): Nuremberg (Nürnberg) Party Badge of 1929

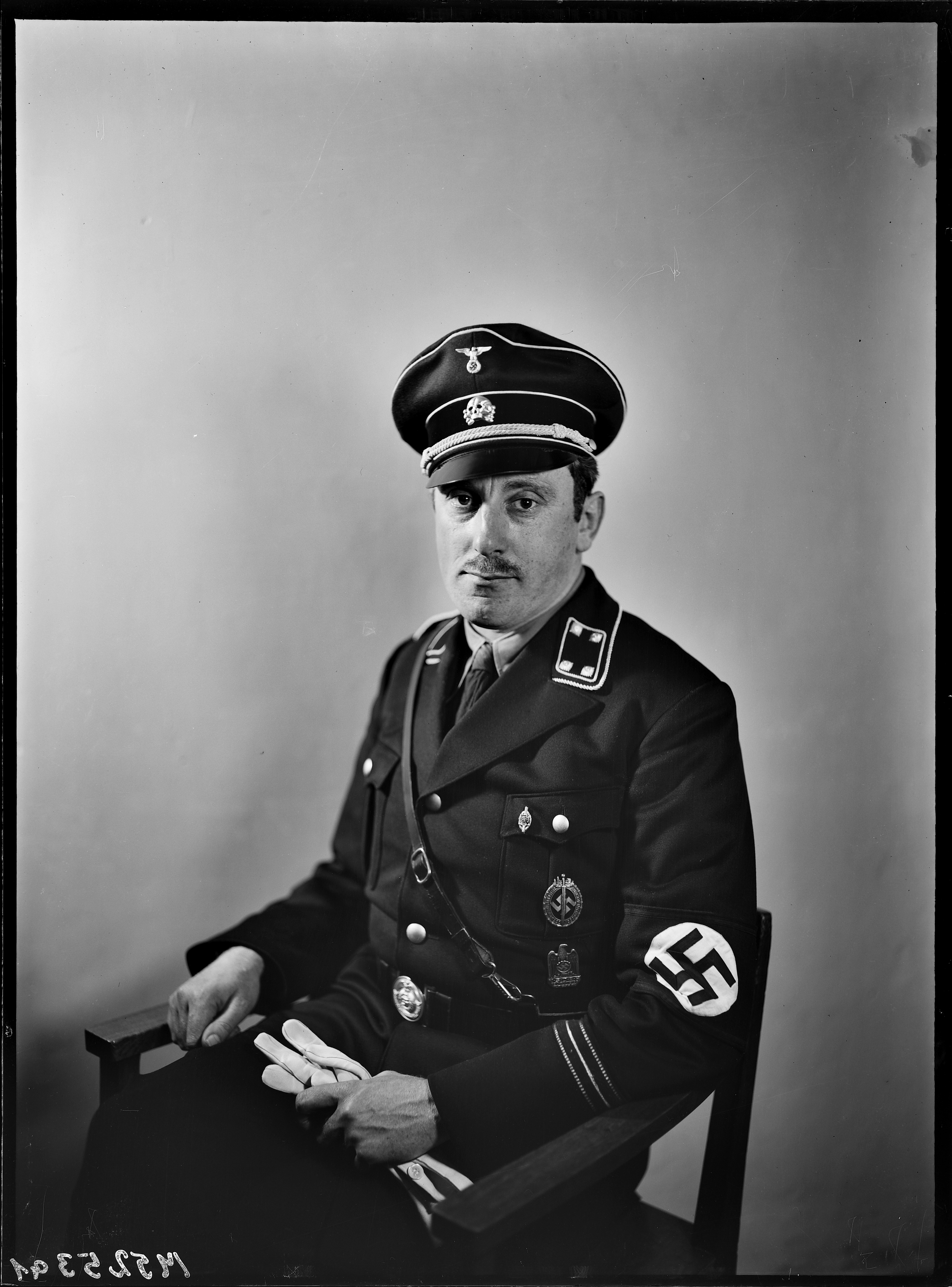
Emil Maurice, Hitler's first personal chauffeur, in 1933 wearing SS-Sturmbannführer uniform with the Coburg Badge on his left breast.

The Coburg Badge (German: Coburger Abzeichen) was the first badge recognised as a national award of the Nazi Party (NSDAP). Subsequently, it was given formal precedence as the highest Party award.

== History ==
On 14 October 1922, Adolf Hitler led 800 members of the Sturmabteilung (SA) from Munich and other Bavarian cities by train to Coburg for a weekend rally. Once there, numerous pitched street battles with communists occurred. In the end, the Nazis were victorious. Later, the day was known as the Deutscher Tag in Coburg (German Day in Coburg).

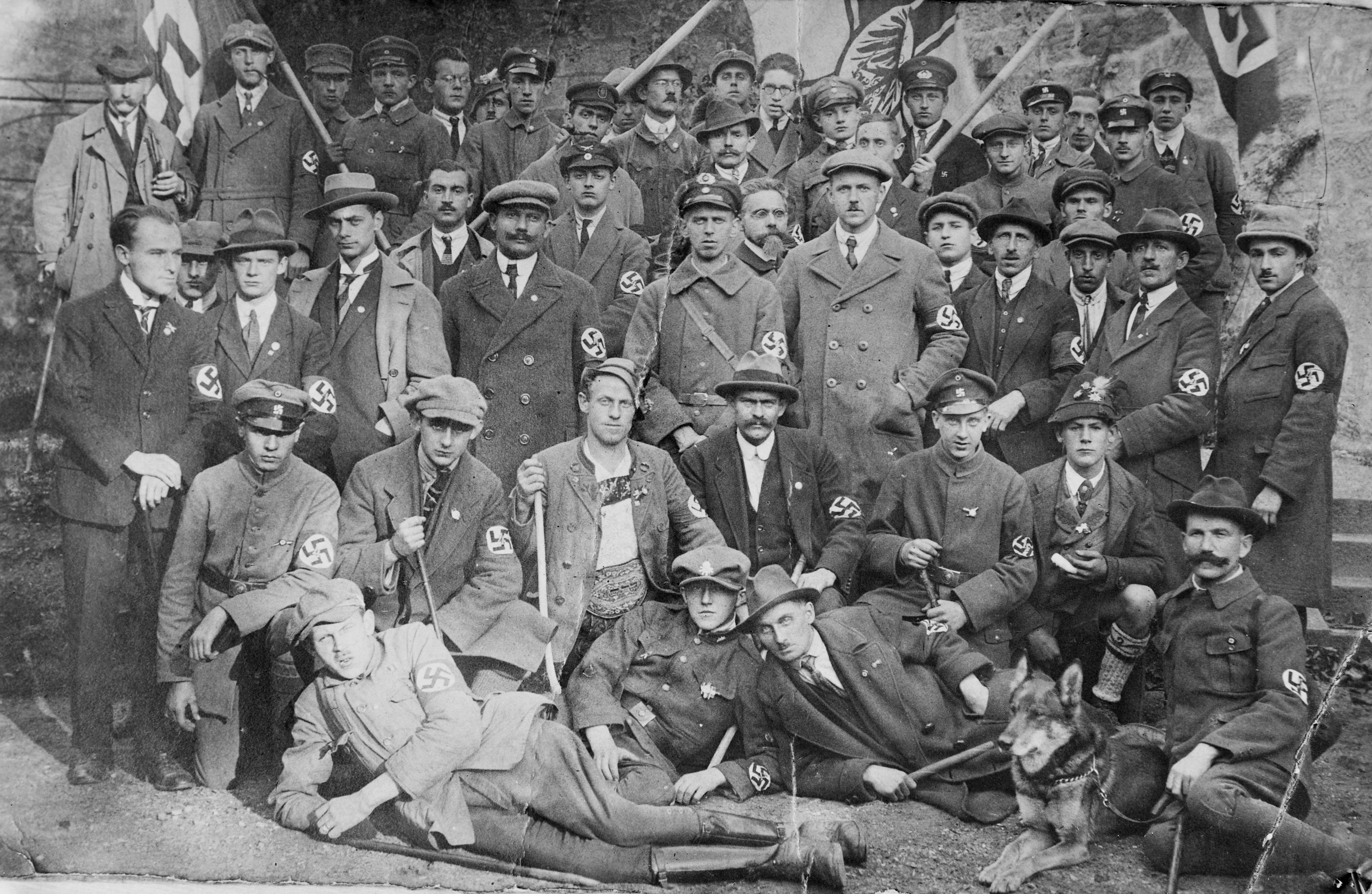
Among the around 650 Nazi Party members who took part in the nationalist (völkisch) event "German Day" (Deutscher Tag) in Coburg in October 1922 were Alfred Rosenberg, Julius Schaub, Ulrich Graf, and Hitler’s dog “Wolf”. The Nazis drove off communist counter-demonstrators, and the event was later regarded in Nazi Party mythology as a turning point for the fledgling Hitler movement (Hitler-Bewegung). The paramilitary SA troops (later known as "brownshirts") did not yet wear standard uniforms. Byline: National Archives and Records Administration

== Award description, precedence and proof of eligibility ==
Hitler ordered the Coburg Badge to be struck on 14 October 1932 to memorialise the event which took place ten years earlier, on Saturday, 14 October 1922, and to honour the participants. This was before Hitler came to power in January 1933. The badge was 40 mm wide and 54 mm high. It was made out of bronze and featured a sword placed tip downward across the face of a swastika within an oval wreath of laurel leaves. At the top of the wreath was a representation of Coburg Castle. The wreath was inscribed with the words, MIT HITLER IN COBURG 1922–1932 (With Hitler in Coburg 1922–1932). It was worn on the left breast.

In a decree signed 6 November 1936, Hitler gave new orders of precedence for the "Orders and Awards" of the Third Reich. The top NSDAP awards were listed in this order: 1. Coburg Badge; 2. Nuremberg Party Day Badge; 3. Brunswick Rally Badge; 4. Golden Party Badge; 5. The Blood Order; followed by the individual Gau badges and the Golden Hitler Youth Badge.

On 1 August 1939, Reichsfuhrer-SS Heinrich Himmler decreed that any SS member (whether enlisted or officer) who wore the Coburg Badge was eligible to wear the Totenkopf ring. Since the Coburg Badge was not normally recorded in an NCO record dossier, the order required enlisted personnel to provide proof of their being awarded the Coburg Badge.

== Selected recipients ==
A total of 436 recipients were recorded on the official Party awards list.

- Max Amann
- Heinrich Bennecke
- Joseph Berchtold
- Wilhelm Brückner
- Walter Buch
- Hermann Esser
- Jakob Grimminger
- Otto Hellmuth
- Emil Maurice
- Martin Mutschmann
- Fritz Sauckel
- Franz Schwede
- Fritz Tittmann
- Karl Weinrich

== See also ==
- Political decorations of the Nazi Party

== Sources ==
- Angolia, John (1989). For Führer and Fatherland: Political & Civil Awards of the Third Reich. R. James Bender Publishing. ISBN 0912138165.
- Doehle, Heinrich (1995) [1943]. Medals & Decorations of the Third Reich: Badges, Decorations, Insignia. Reddick Enterprises. ISBN 0962488348.
- Dombrowski, Hanns (1940). Orders, Ehrenzeichen und Titel.
- Gottlieb, Craig. The SS TOTENKOPF RING: An Illustrated History from Munich to Nuremberg. ISBN 978-0-7643-3094-0.
- Lumsden, Robin (2001). Medals and Decorations of Hitler's Germany. MBI Publishing Company. ISBN 9780760311332.
- Miller, Michael D. (2006). Leaders of the SS & German Police. Vol. 1 Reichsführer SS – Gruppenführer (Georg Ahrens to Karl Gutenberger). R. James Bender Publishing. ISBN 978-9-329-70037-2.
- Miller, Michael D.; Schulz, Andreas (2012). Gauleiter: The Regional Leaders of the Nazi Party and Their Deputies, 1925–1945. Vol. 1 (Herbert Albrecht – H. Wilhelm Hüttmann). R. James Bender Publishing. ISBN 978-1-932-97021-0.
- Miller, Michael D.; Schulz, Andreas (2017). Gauleiter: The Regional Leaders of the Nazi Party and Their Deputies, 1925–1945. Vol. 2 (Georg Joel – Dr. Bernhard Rust). R. James Bender Publishing. ISBN 978-1-932-97032-6.
- Miller, Michael D.; Schulz, Andreas (2021). Gauleiter: The Regional Leaders of the Nazi Party and Their Deputies, 1925–1945. Vol. 3 (Fritz Sauckel –- Hans Zimmermann). Fonthill Media. ISBN 978-1-781-55826-3.
- Miller, Michael D.; Schulz, Andreas (2015). Leaders of the Storm Troops. Vol. 1. Solihull, England: Helion & Company. ISBN 978-1-909-98287-1.
