= German Equestrian Badge =

German Horseman's Badge Das Deutsche Reitterabzeichen
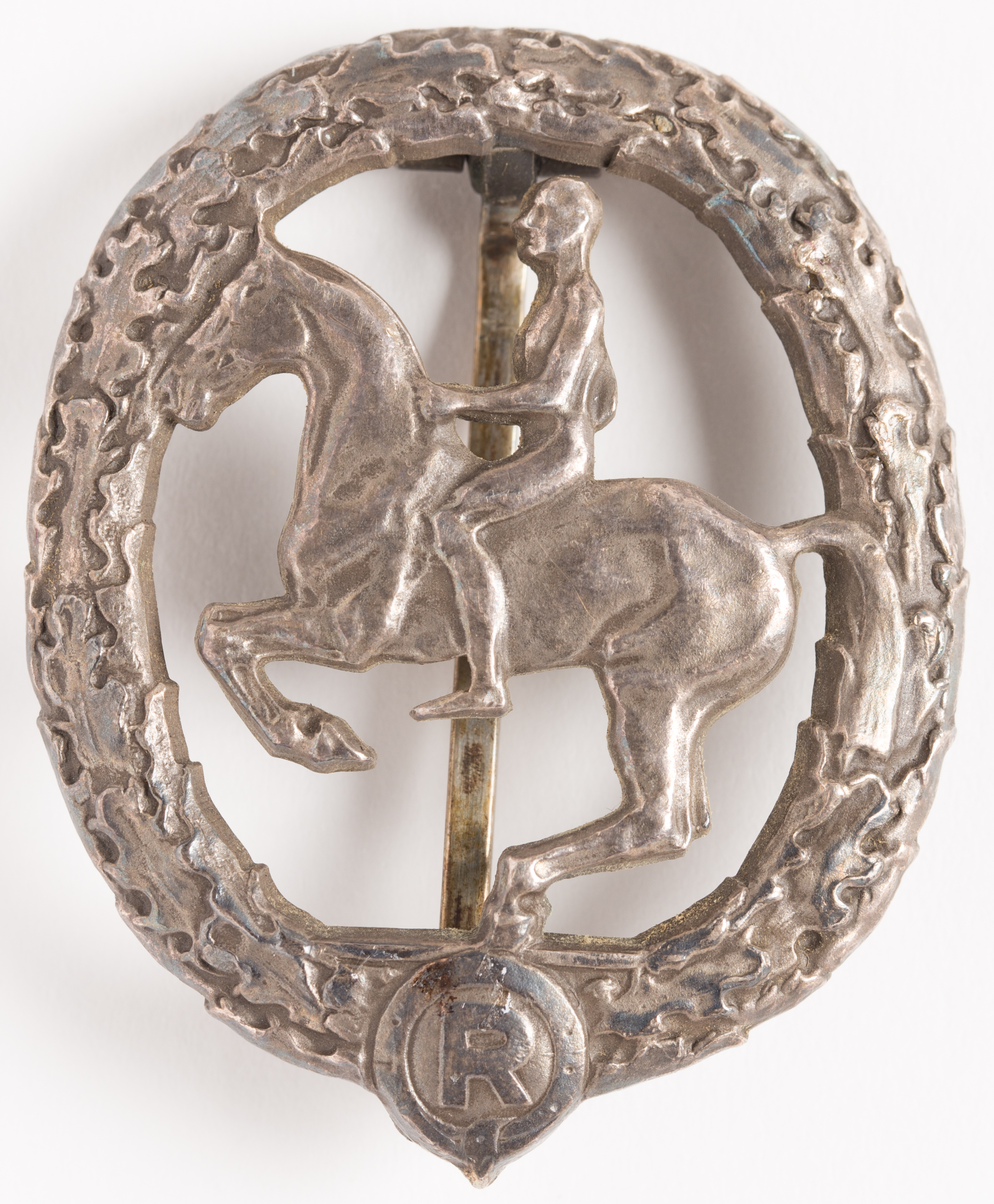
- German Horseman's Badge in silver
- Type: Sports award
- Awarded for: proficiency in riding horses
- Country: Weimar Republic & Nazi Germany
- Presented by: National Agriculture Association
- Established: 9 April 1930
- Final award: 1945

The German Horseman's Badge (German: Das Deutsche Reitterabzeichen) also referred to in general terms as the German Equestrian Badge, was a sports decoration of the Weimar Republic and Nazi Germany. It was awarded for proficiency in riding horses. Equestrian badges (German: Reitabzeichen) remain a part of German rider training today, although their appearance is completely different.

== History ==
It was instituted by the National Agriculture Association, affiliated with the National Association for Breeding and Animal Inspection and Control, authorized on 9 April 1930 as the German Horseman's Badge. The badge was awarded in three classes of Bronze, Silver, and Gold. The badge had an oval oakleaf wreath, and within the wreath was a mounted horseman astride a prancing horse with a Roman "R" letter in a circle at the base of the wreath.

Each of the classes may have been awarded:

1. on the basis of special achievements.
2. on the basis of tournament events.
3. on the basis of racing events.

More difficult criteria had to be met to obtain the higher class. The badge was to be worn on the left breast. Notable recipients of the German Equestrian Badge include Reinhard Heydrich and Hermann Fegelein.

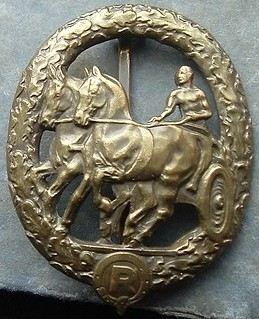
German Horse Driver's Badge

Also from the National Association for Breeding and Animal Inspection and Control was the German Horse Driver's Badge (German: Das Deutscher Fahrerabzeichen), which was presented for professional horse race competitions and authorized in May 1930. The badge was of the same design as the German Horseman's Badge, with the exception of the mounted horseman being replaced by a chariot driver being pulled by two horses. The badge was issued in three classes of Bronze, Silver, and Gold. The requirements were the same as for the Horseman's Badge, except for the "trotting race", replacing the racing event. This award was also worn on the left breast. In addition, the German Care of Horses Badge (German: Deutsches Pferdepflege-Abzeichen), which showed a man next to a horse, were issued to qualified persons in bronze, silver, and gold.

== See also ==
- SA Sports Badge
- German Sports Badge
