= Gau badge =

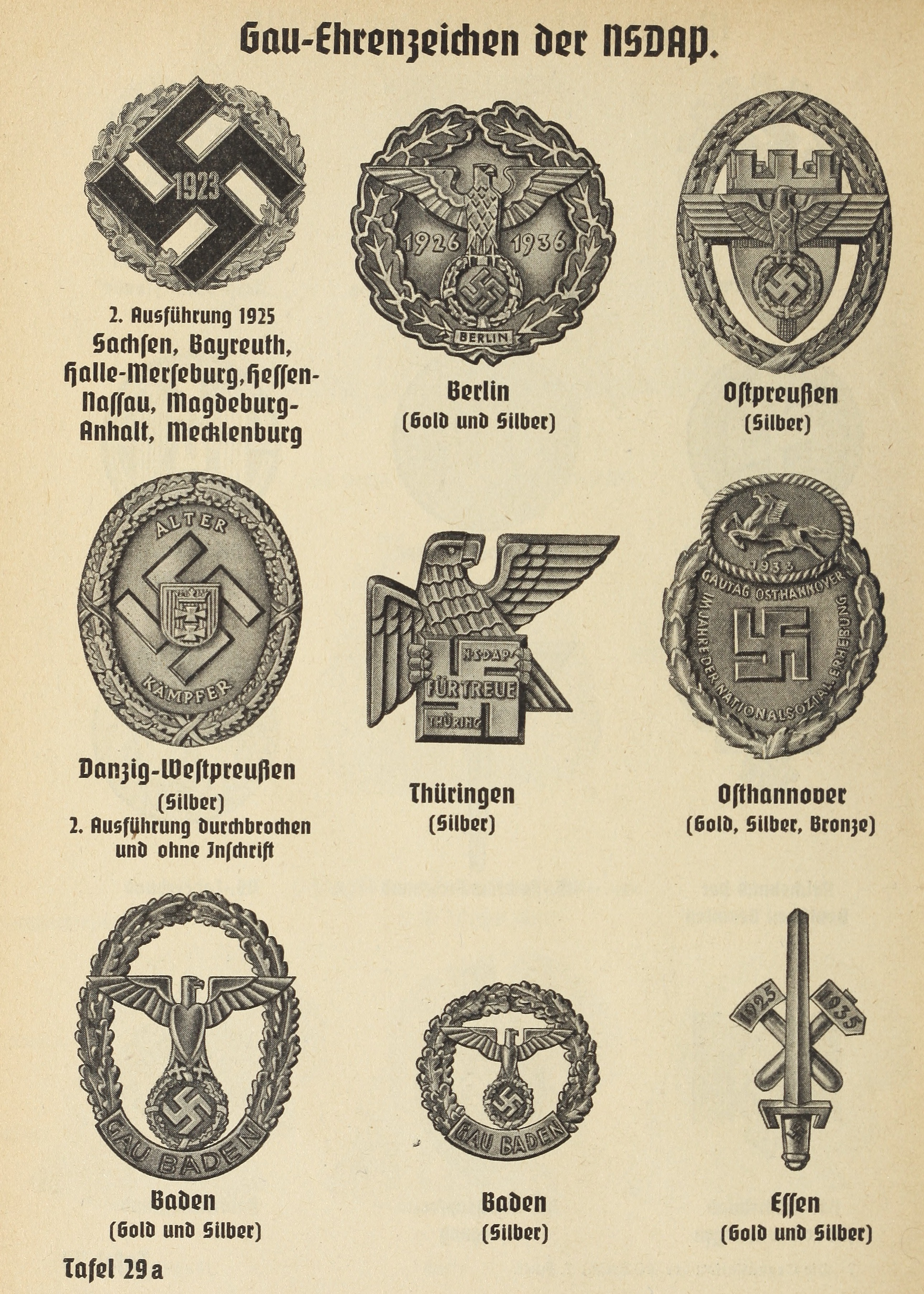
Gau badge

A Gau badge (Gau-Abzeichen) or Gau Commemorate Badges (Gau-Traditions, Gau-Ehrenzeichen) were a political award of the Nazi Party, issued by various Gauleiters of the Nazi political districts to recognize loyal service or to commemorate an event. The Gau badges were considered Party awards, but were not recognized as national awards. Regulations for award were determined by the Gauleiter as were any award degrees. They could be worn at any time, except when wearing the Golden Party Badge. A few were issued in different classes, such as silver and gold.

== List of Gau badges ==
- General Gau Badge (1923 and 1925)
- Thuringia Gau Badge
- Baden Gau Badge
- East Hannover Gau Badge
- Essen Gau Badge
- Berlin Gau Badge
- Danzig Gau Badge
- East Prussia Gau Badge
- Wartheland Badge
- Sudetenland Badge
