= Civil Defence Decoration =

Nazi German award

Civil Defence Decoration Luftschutz Ehrenzeichen
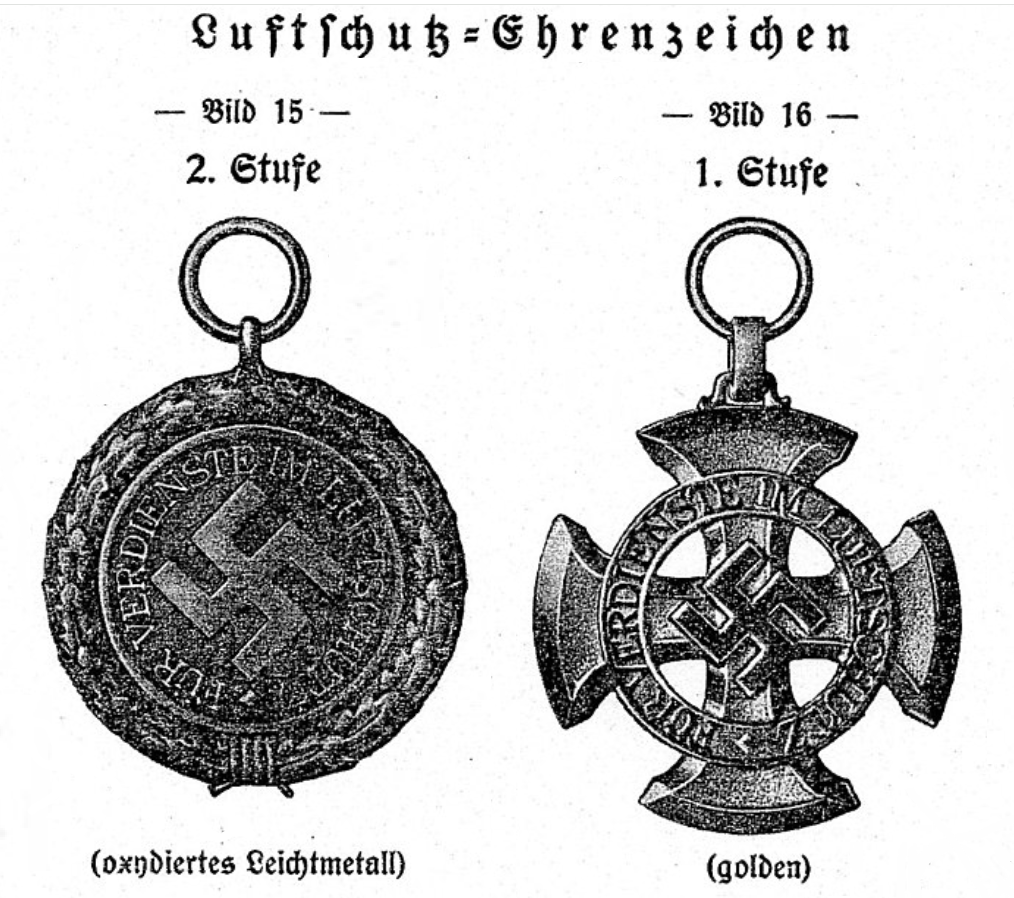
- Second and first class
- Type: Civil award
- Awarded for: services to German air defence
- Presented by: Nazi Germany
- Status: Obsolete
- Established: 30 January 1938
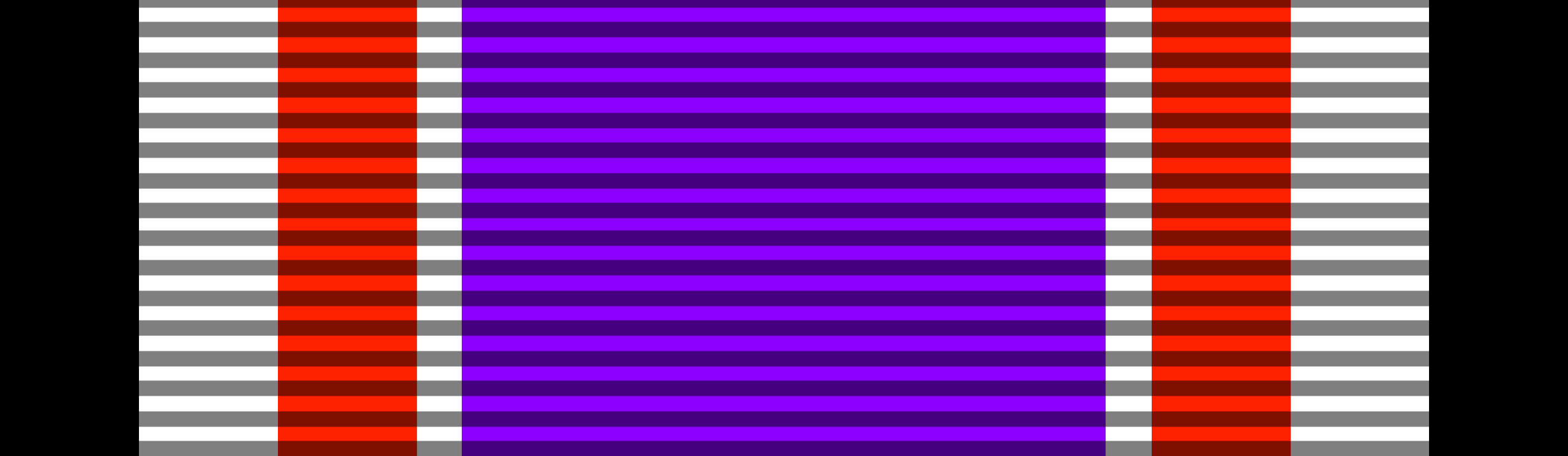
- Ribbon bar

The Civil Defence Decoration (Luftschutz Ehrenzeichen) was a German civil award created by Adolf Hitler on 30 January 1938.

== Description ==
It was awarded for meritorious service in German air raid protection. It was open both to members of the Reichsluftschutzbund, the principal German air raid precautions organisation, and others involved in this work, including police, fire and emergency services. It was usually necessary to have at least four years service before an award could be made.

It was bestowed in two classes:

- 1st class: a gilt cross with curved arms. It had a swastika in the centre within a ring bearing the inscription: Für Verdienst im Luftschutz (For merit in Air Defence). It was awarded for outstanding contributions to air defence in Germany.
- 2nd class: a circular medal in grey metal, framed by an oak wreath. In the centre is a swastika surrounded by the inscription: Für Verdienst im Luftschutz (For merit in Air Defence). It was awarded to those who had made special contributions to air defence.

The reverse of both classes bore the date 1938, the year the decoration was instituted. Both classes were worn on the left chest on a light purple ribbon with black-white-red borders.

About 200 1st class crosses were awarded. The second class was more common.

== Post war ==
The wearing of Nazi era decorations was banned after Germany's defeat in 1945. The Civil Defence Decoration was among those re-authorised for wear by the Federal Republic of Germany in 1957, re-designed to remove the swastika symbol.

== Sources ==
- Dorling, H. Taprell (1956). Ribbons and Medals. London: A. H. Baldwin & Sons. OCLC 930416375.
- Littlejohn, David; Dodkins, Colonel C. M. (1968). Orders, Decorations, Medals and Badges of the Third Reich. R. James Bender Publishing, California. ISBN 978-0854200801.
- Lumsden, Robin (2001). Medals and Decorations of Hitler's Germany. Airlife Publishing. ISBN 1-84037-178-1.
- Deutsches Reichsgesetzblatt (1938). Statute of the Luftschutz Ehrenzeichen, 30 January 1938 (in German).
- German Federal law (1957). Bundesministerium der Justiz: Gesetz über Titel, Orden und Ehrenzeichen, 26.7.1957. Bundesgesetzblatt Teil III, Gliederungsnummer 1132-1 (in German).
- German Federal regulation (1996). Dienstvorschriften Nr. 14/97. Bezug: Anzugordnung für die Soldaten der Bundeswehr. ZDv 37/10 (in German).
