= Wehrmacht Long Service Award =

Military award in Nazi Germany

Wehrmacht Long Service Award Wehrmacht-Dienstauszeichnung
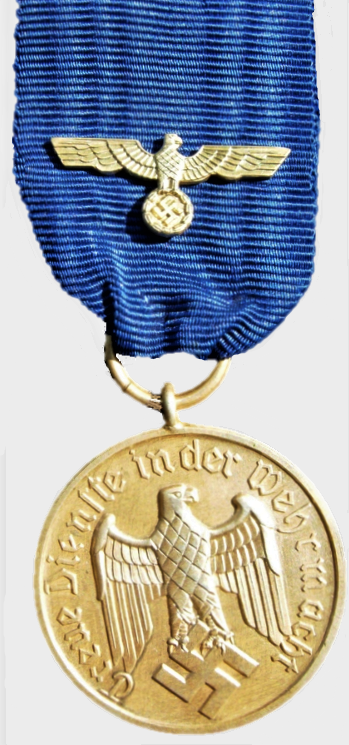
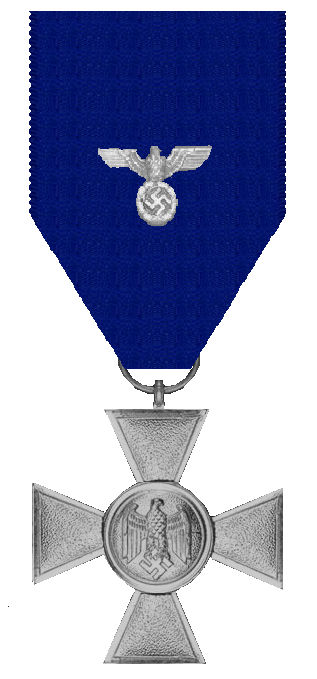
- 3rd class (12 years) and 2nd class (18 years)
- Type: Medal
- Awarded for: Long service in the Wehrmacht
- Presented by: Nazi Germany
- Eligibility: Military personnel
- Campaign: World War II
- Status: Obsolete
- Established: 16 March 1936

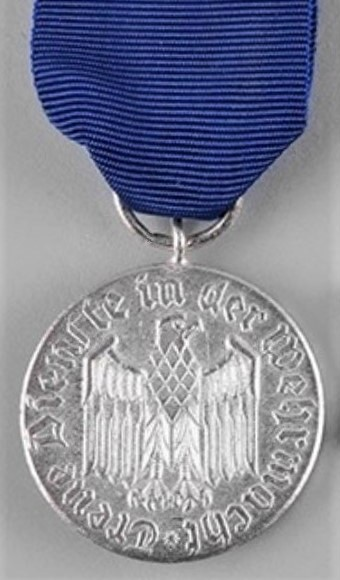
Post war version without swastika

The Wehrmacht Long Service Award (German: Wehrmacht-Dienstauszeichnung) was a military service decoration of Nazi Germany issued for satisfactory completion of a number of years in military service.

== History ==
On 16 March 1936, Adolf Hitler ordered the institution of a service award in four classes, each class reflecting the completion of a select number of years of military service.

The award was bestowed by each branch of the Wehrmacht (army, navy, and air force) and was issued for four years service (fourth class – silver medal), twelve years (third class – gold medal), eighteen years (second class – silver cross), twenty-five years (first class – gold cross), and 40 years (special class). The forty-year special class was introduced on 10 March 1939.

Recipients of the higher-level awards wore the decoration simultaneously with one lower-level award. The manner they were worn was:

- 3rd Class with 4th Class (gold medal with silver medal)
- 2nd Class with 4th Class (silver cross with silver medal)
- 1st Class with 3rd Class (gold cross with gold medal).

The Long Service Award was retroactive throughout a service member's career, encompassing Reichswehr service as well as service dating during and before World War I. As such, there were a handful of forty-year awards presented, even though the Nazi era only lasted 12 years (1933–1945).

The awards were worn on the left chest, immediately before the medals commemorating the annexation of Austria, Sudetenland, and Memel.

== Design ==
The awards were designed by Professor Dr Richard Klein.

Apart from their finish (gilt or silver), the third and fourth-class medals have a common obverse. Both are 30mm in diameter and bear the German eagle clutching a swastika, surrounded by the words Treue Dienste in der Wehrmacht (Loyal service in the armed forces). The reverse shows the number of years of service, either '4' or '12', surrounded by a wreath.
Likewise, the design of the first and second class crosses are similar. Both bear the German eagle on the obverse center, with the years of service, '18' or '25', on the reverse. The first class is gilt and 38mm wide – the second silver and 35mm. The forty-year award is identical to the first class, with the addition of a gilt oakleaf cluster to the ribbon.

Wehrmacht Long Service Awards were among Nazi era awards reauthorised for wear in 1957, redesigned to remove the now-banned swastika symbol.

== Ribbons ==
The medal used the cornflower blue ribbon of the pre-1918 Prussian long service medals. The recipient's arm of service was indicated by an emblem on the ribbon: a spread eagle and swastika for the army and Kriegsmarine, and a flying eagle and swastika for the Luftwaffe, the emblem corresponding in color with the metal of the award.

Ribbon bar "Long Service Award of the Wehrmacht"
Army and Kriegsmarine version					
Luftwaffe version					
For	4 years	12 years	18 years	25 years	40 years and more

== Other long service awards ==
The SS maintained their own Long Service Award given in grades of four years, eight years, twelve years, and twenty-five years. The Nazi Party and German Police had similar service awards. The Nazi Party Long Service Award was given in grades of ten, fifteen, and twenty-five years. The Police Long Service Award was given in grades of eight, eighteen, twenty-five, and forty years (though the last class was never awarded).

In the early 1960s, the West German Bundeswehr considered creating a new long service award in line with previous Imperial and Wehrmacht models. However, it never made it past the prototype phase. In 1980, the Badge of Honour of the Bundeswehr was established, which, along with meritorious achievement, also recognizes long service in various grades.

== See also ==
- Orders, decorations, and medals of Nazi Germany
