= Hitler Youth Badge =

Political decoration of Nazi Germany

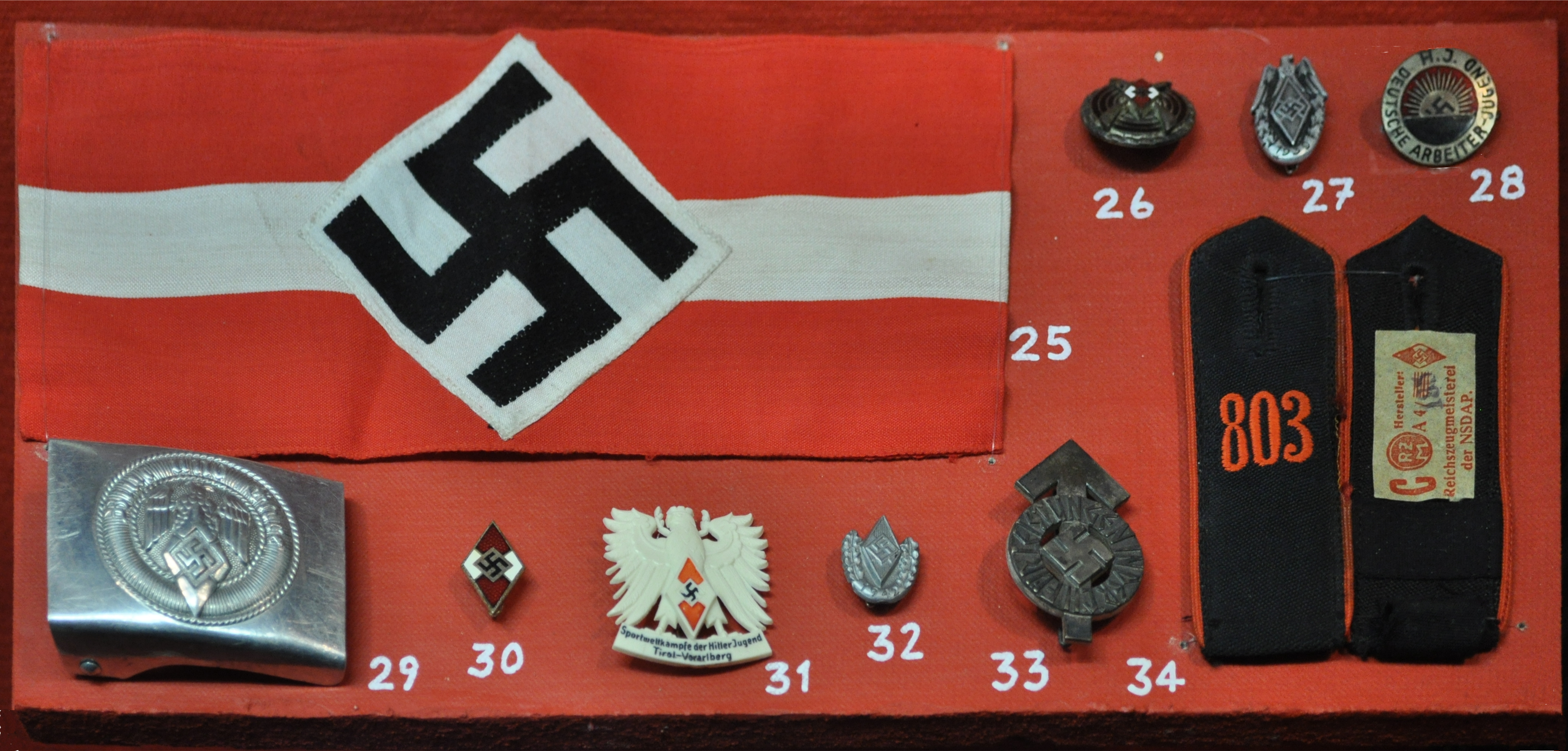
Uniform items and decorations of the Hitler Youth: 25. arm band; 26. shooting award; 27. award pin; 28. young workers pin; 29. belt plate; 30. membership badge; 31. event pin; 32. award pin; 33. sport proficiency badge; 34. shoulder straps with unit number

The Hitler Youth Badge (German: Das Hitler-Jugend-Abzeichen) was a political decoration of Nazi Germany, awarded for various degrees of service to the Hitler Youth, (Hitler Jugend). The badge was first created in 1929, with formal regulations for presentation as a decoration formalized from 1933. In addition, the Hitler Youth introduced a number of other awards for merit and proficiency.

The public wear of all Nazi Party awards, including the Hitler Youth badge, was banned after 1945.

== Grades ==
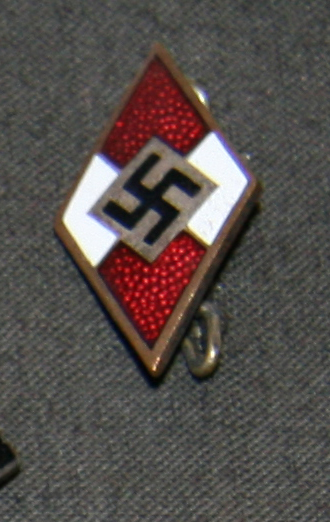
Hitler Youth Badge

There were three grades of the Hitler Youth Badge, each a small pinback badge featuring the Hitler Youth emblem and worn on the left breast pocket.

=== Hitler Youth Badge ===
This is the standard Hitler Youth Badge denoting membership, particularly for leaders. It could not be worn once the wearer had left the Hitler Youth.

The badge shows the Hitler Youth emblem: a golden framed rhomboid having in the centre a golden square field with a black swastika in a red and white field, with a silver-coloured edge.

=== Golden Hitler Youth Badge ===
With permission from Hitler on 23 June 1934, the Golden Hitler Youth Badge (German: Das Goldene Hitler-Jugend-Abzeichen) was established as an honour award by the National Youth Leader (Reichsjugendführer) Baldur von Schirach in recognition of leadership, long service or other special achievements in the Hitler Youth. Recipients included those who joined before 2 October 1932 and who completed five-years unbroken service. It could also be awarded for merit, irrespective of length of service.

The badge was numbered on the reverse and is similar in appearance to the standard badge, but edged in gilt rather than silver. The right to wear the Golden Hitler Youth Badge continued after the recipient left the Hitler Youth and no longer wore the uniform. The Leader of the National Hitler Youth could grant the right for the recipient to wear the badge indefinitely.

=== Golden Hitler Youth Badge with Oakleaves ===
The Golden Hitler Youth Badge with Oakleaves (German: Das Goldene Hitler-Jugend Ehrenzeichen mit Eichenlaub) was instituted in 1935 to recognise exceptional services to the Hitler Youth. Only about 250 were awarded.

The badge is similar to the other badges, but is framed with a narrow border of oak leaves and is of higher workmanship. It was recognised as an official Party decoration, and could therefore be worn on any uniform.

== Proficiency and other badges ==
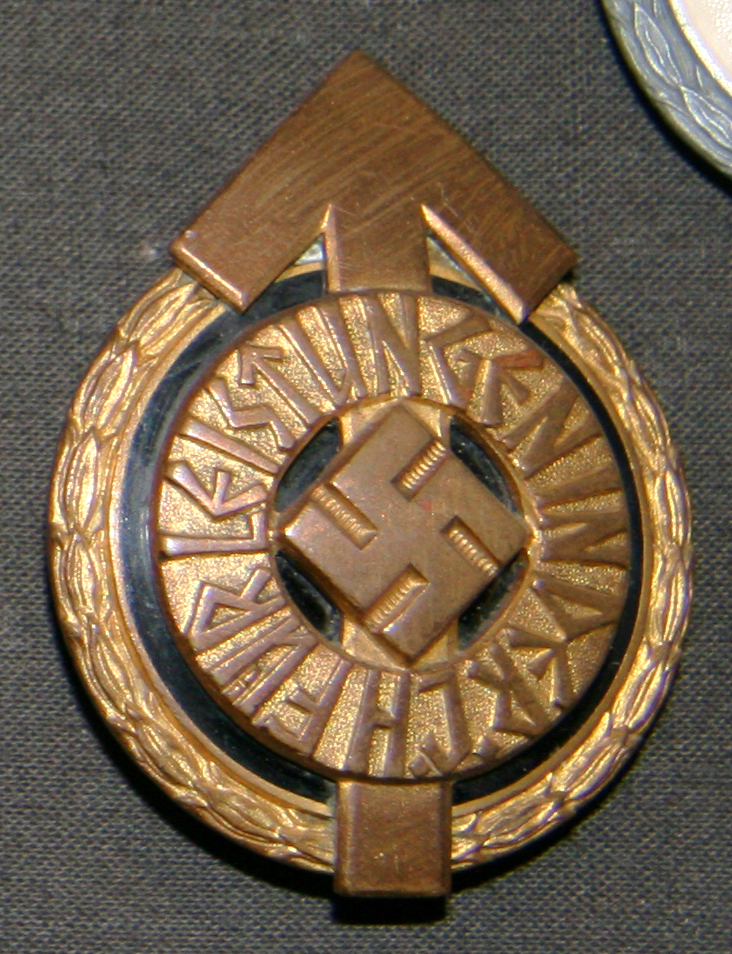
Leader's Gold Sports Badge

In addition to the Hitler Youth Badge, a number of other awards were instituted, both for proficiency and for notable contributions to the Hitler Youth.

=== Hitler Youth Leader's Sports Badge in Gold ===
From January 1937, officers in the Hitler Youth and Jungvolk were required to pass an annual fitness test covering a number of different sports. In May 1938 a special Leader's Sports Badge in Gold (German: Goldenes Fuhrersportabzeichen der Hitler Jugend) was instituted for award to those officers who achieved the highest scores in these tests.

The copper gilt badge consists of a swastika surrounded by a ring bearing the inscription: 'Für Leistunger in der HJ' (For achievers in the HJ) in runic-style script, set in front of a large tiwaz rune, surrounded by a narrow laurel wreath. The reverse is numbered and has a pin for wear on the left breast pocket. Over 11,000 were awarded.

=== Hitler Youth Proficiency Badge ===
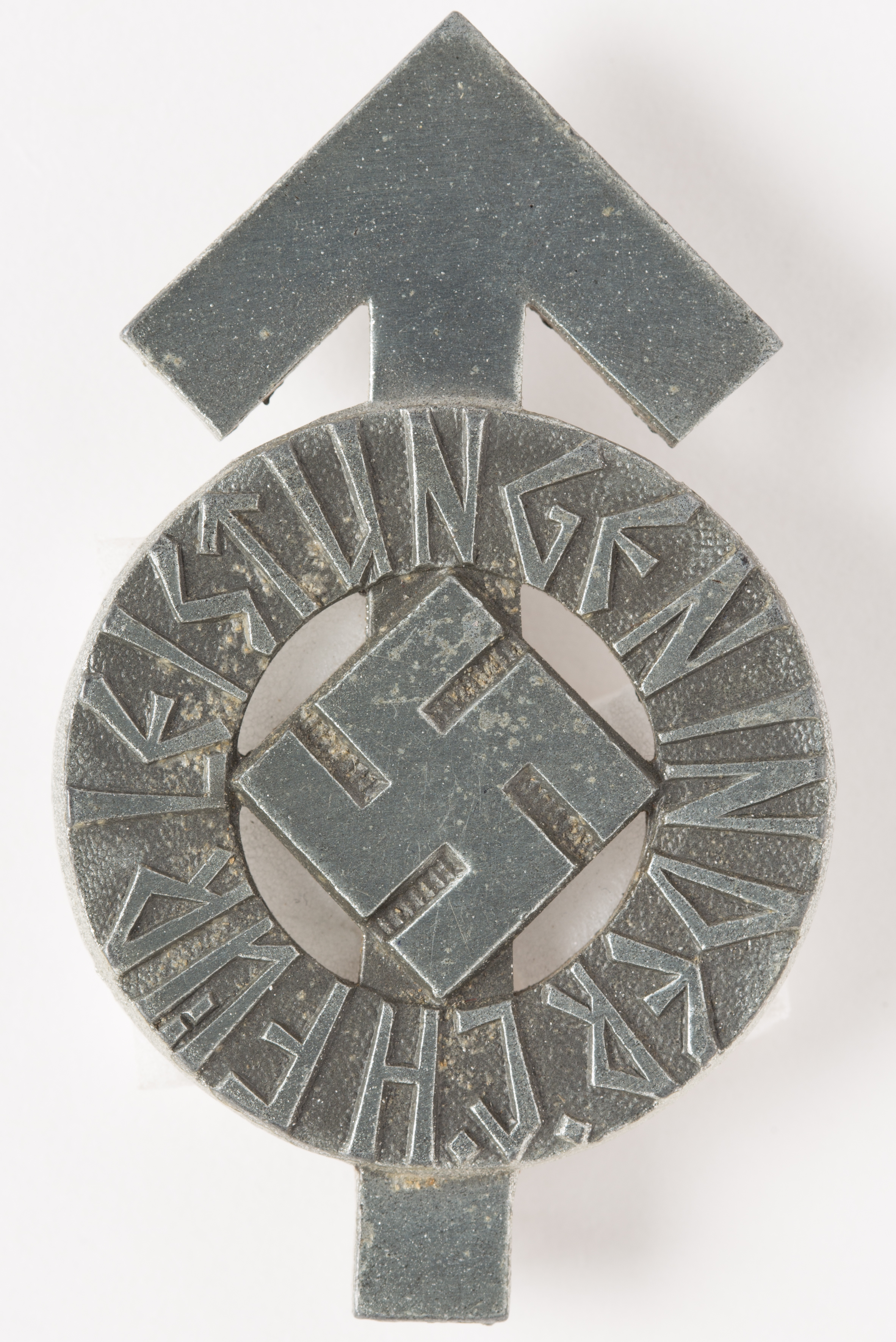
Proficiency Badge in silver

The Hitler Youth Proficiency Badge (German: Leistungsabzeichen der Hitler Jugend) was instituted in June 1934 for Hitler Youth members who passed a sports test covering athletics, field craft and rudimentary political knowledge.

The badge consists of a swastika surrounded by a ring bearing the inscription: 'Für Leistunger in der HJ' (For achievers in the HJ) in runic-style script, set in front of a large tiwaz rune. The reverse is numbered and has a pin for wear on the breast pocket. It was presented in silver for boys over 17 and bronze for 16 year-olds, with members of the Jungvolk receiving a black version until 1937, when a special Jungvolk badge was introduced. By the end of 1943, 103,061 bronze and 217,093 silver badges had been awarded.

=== Hitler Youth shooting badges ===
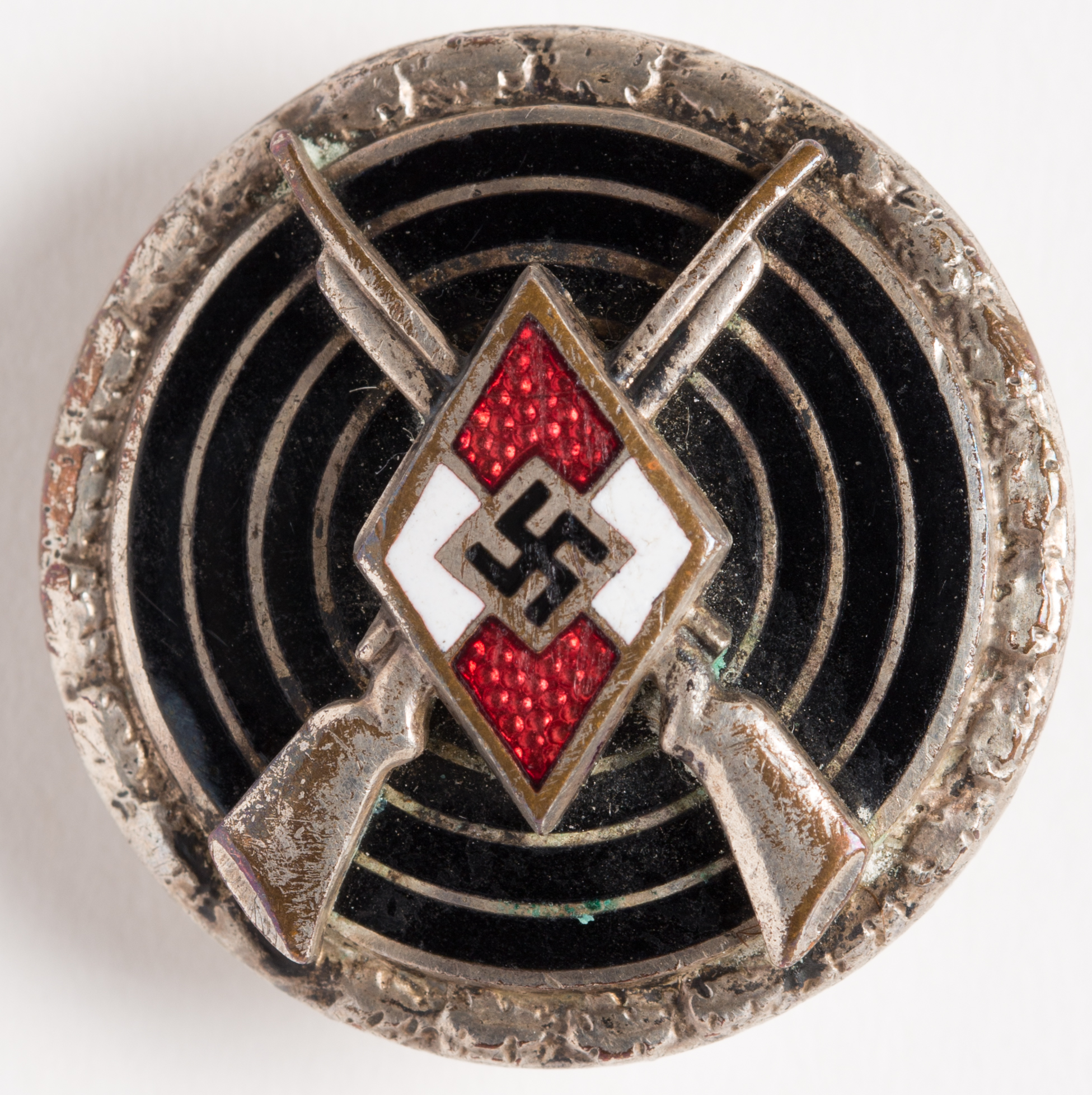
Sharpshooter badge

Hitler Youth shooting awards (German: Hitler Jugend Schiessauszeichnungen) were awarded in three grades:

- For proficient shooters (Für Schützen). Instituted in 1936. It is a circular silver and enamel badge in the shape of a target with, in the centre, the Hitler Youth badge in front of two crossed rifles. By the end of 1943 273,545 had been awarded.
- For sharpshooters (Für Scharfschützen). Instituted in 1938. Similar to the shooters badge, but edged with a silver wreath. 31,904 were awarded by the end of 1943.
- For champion shots (Für Meisterschützen). Instituted in 1938. Similar to the shooters badge, but edged with a gilt wreath. 852 had been awarded by the end of 1943.
- Jungvolk shooting badge (Schiessauszeichnunge des Deutsches Jungvolks). It is similar to the shooters badge, but bears the Jungvolk emblem in front of crossed rifles, flanked with the letters 'D' 'J'. By the end of 1943, there had been 580,872 awards.

Each badge was worn on the left breast pocket of the Hitler Youth uniform only.

=== Hitler Youth Badge for Distinguished Foreigners ===
A special degree, the Hitler Youth Badge for Distinguished Foreigners (German: Ehrenzeichen der Reichsjugendführung der Hitler-Jugend für Verdiente Ausländer), was authorized in 1941 for presentation to non-German citizens who supported the goals of the Hitler Youth.

An oval gilt and enamel badge, it shows a spread eagle above the Hitler Youth emblem. It is edged with a brown band, bearing the words Hitler Jugend.

=== Hitler Youth Firefighting Badges ===
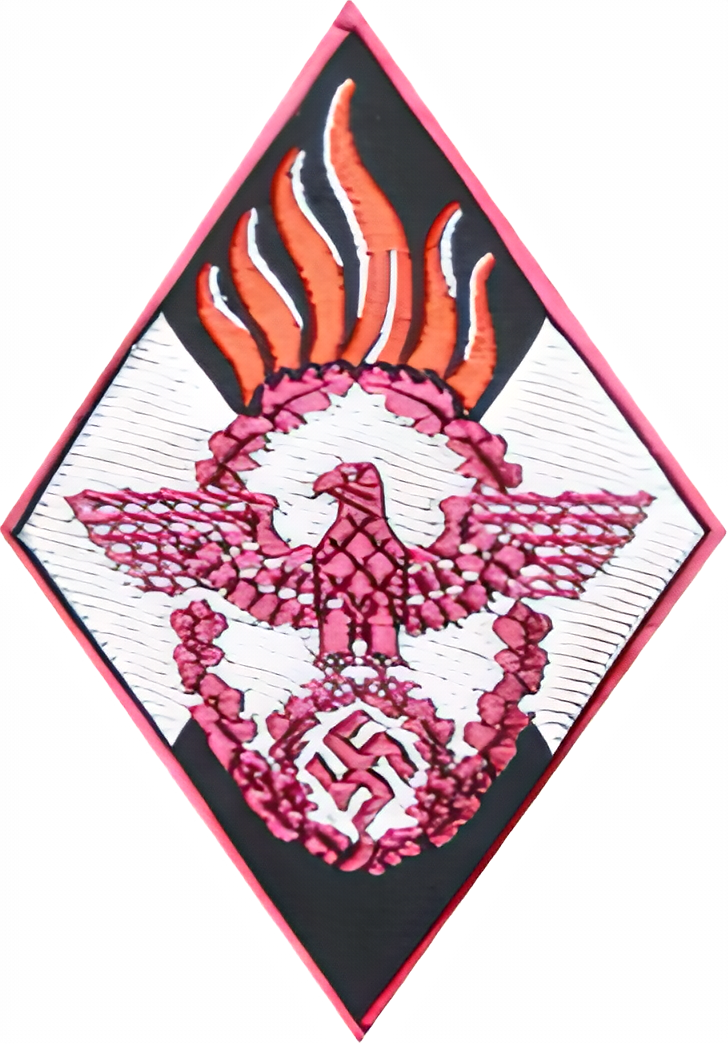
HJ-Feuerwehrabzeichen (Hitler Youth Firefighting Badge) edged in carmine, indicating the basic level badge

HJ-Feuerwehrscharen (Hitler Youth Firefighters) personnel were eligible to earn the HJ-Feuerwehrabzeichen (Hitler Youth Fire Brigade Badge), issued in two degrees; Formationsabzeichen (standard badge), edged in carmine, and the Führerabzeichen (fire unit leaders' badge), edged in white or silver. Apart from the edging, the badges were identical; a diamond-shaped cloth insignia worn on the lower-left outer sleeve of appropriate HJ uniforms, featuring a carmine Polizeiadler ("police eagle" insignia) superimposed on red and black flames. The badges were earned via a standardized pass-or-fail series of firefighting-related tests.

== Significant recipients ==
Recipients of the Hitler Youth Badge included:

- Artur Axmann
- Gottlob Berger
- Fritz Bracht (Golden Hitler Youth Badge with Oakleaves), 1941
- Paul Giesler (Golden Hitler Youth Badge with Oakleaves)
- Heinrich Himmler
- Adolf Hitler
- Hartmann Lauterbacher (Golden Hitler Youth Badge with Oakleaves)
- Friedrich Rainer (Golden Hitler Youth Badge with Oakleaves)
- Baldur von Schirach (Golden Hitler Youth Badge with Oakleaves)
- Albert Speer
