= Civil Service Faithful Service Medal =

Nazi Germany medal of honor

National Faithful Service Medal In Silver
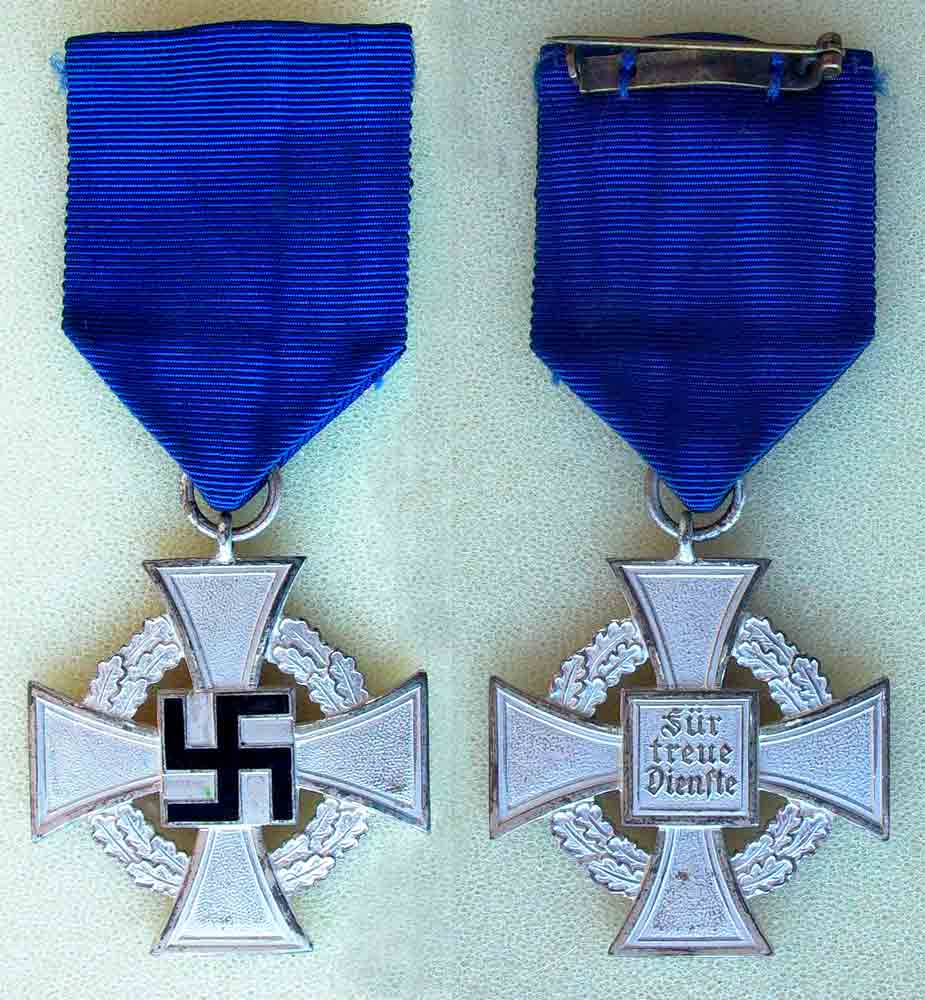
- The National Faithful Service Medal In Silver, Obverse and Reverse.
- Type: Service Medal
- Awarded for: 25 years or more of Faithful Service
- Presented by: Nazi Germany
- Eligibility: Civilian employees of the public service
- Status: Obsolete
- First award: Unknown
- Final award: Unknown

Highlights
- Total: Unknown
- Total awarded posthumously: No
- Total recipients: Unknown

Precedence
- Next (higher): Civil Service Faithful Service Medal In Gold
- Next (lower): Employee and Worker Faithful Service Medal

The Civil Service Faithful Service Medal (Treudienst-Ehrenzeichen für Beamte Angestellte und Arbeiter im öffentlichen Dienst) was a Nazi German medal of honour instituted on 30 January 1938, in two grades (the first subdivided) and a special class Employee and Worker Faithful Service Medal to reward civilians for long and faithful service.

== Description ==
All officials, employees, and laborers at any level of the public service (local, regional or national) who complete 25, 40 or 50 years service were eligible. All three awards were of the same design, but with different colour variants, depending on the class.

The second class award was for 25 years of service was a silver cross, with a silver wreath and a black enamelled swastika in the center of the cross.

The first class award was for 40 years of service was a gold cross, with a gold wreath and a black enamelled swastika in the center of the cross.

The first class award with oakleaves, for 50 years of service, featured a silver cross, with a gold wreath and black enamelled swastika to the centre.

The special class for 50 years of service of employees and workers in the private sector.

The reverse of both classes was stamped with 'Für treue Dienste' (For faithful Services). The ribbon for the medal is cornflower blue.
