= SS Chevron for Former Police and Military =

Nazi German badge

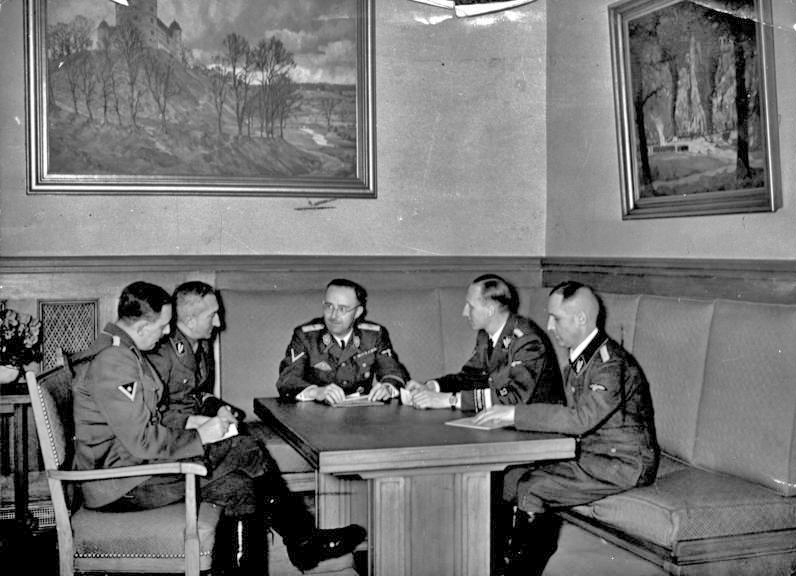
1939 photo: Shown left to right are Huber, Nebe, Himmler, Heydrich and Heinrich Müller. The SS Chevron for Former Police and Military is shown Huber's uniform and the Honour Chevron for the Old Guard is shown on Himmler's uniform

The SS Chevron for Former Police and Military (German: SS-Ehrenwinkel mit Stern für ehemalige Polizei- und Wehrmachtsangehörige) was a prior service qualification badge worn by members of the Nazi Party Schutzstaffel (SS) who had previously served as professional law enforcement, as members of the Reichswehr or members of Der Stahlhelm, Bund der Frontsoldaten ("The Steel helmet, League of front-line Soldiers").

The SS Chevron was similar in appearance to the Honour Chevron for the Old Guard, but with a darkened center and a silver service pip. Holders of this SS Chevron included Arthur Nebe, who had earned the chevron through prior service as a detective with the Berlin Police Department and Franz Josef Huber who earned his chevron through prior service as a police inspector with the Munich Police Department.
