= Honour Chevron for the Old Guard =

Honour Chevron for the Old Guard Ehrenwinkel der Alten Kämpfer
- Awarded for: Joining any party organisation before 30 January 1933
- Country: German Reich
- Presented by: NSDAP
- Eligibility: Members of the Schutzstaffel
- Status: Obsolete
- Established: February 1934
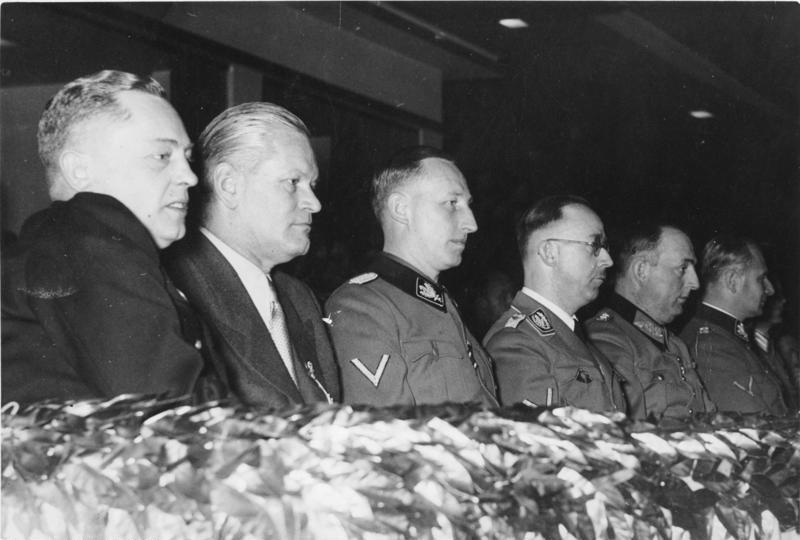
- 1941 photo: showing the Honour Chevron for the Old Guard on the sleeve of the SS uniforms of (from middle to right) Reinhard Heydrich, Heinrich Himmler and Karl Wolff (extreme right).

Precedence
- Equivalent: SS Chevron for Former Police and Military

The Honour Chevron for the Old Guard (German: Ehrenwinkel der Alten Kämpfer) was a Nazi Party decoration worn by members of the SS. The silver chevron, which was worn on the upper sleeve on the right arm, was authorised by Adolf Hitler in February 1934. All members of the SS who had joined the Allgemeine SS, the NSDAP, or any other party organisation prior to 30 January 1933, were entitled to wear the insignia.

After the Anschluss in Austria, the Nazi Party authorized that the award could be worn by all Austrians who had joined the Austrian National Socialist Workers' Party (DNSAP) prior to 18 February 1938. Qualification was later extended to include any SS personnel who were former members of the Nazi Security services, the Ordnungspolizei (order police) and the Wehrmacht, if they fulfilled certain conditions.

== See also ==
- SS Chevron for Former Police and Military
- Political decorations of the Nazi Party
