= Nazi Party Long Service Award =

NSDAP medal for long service

Nazi Party Long Service Award Die Dienstauszeichnung der NSDAP
- 25 years of service
- Type: Award
- Country: Nazi Germany
- Motto: Treue für Führer und Volk ("Loyalty to Leader and People")
- Eligibility: Members of the Nazi Party
- Criteria: Long service in the Nazi Party
- Status: Abolished
- Führer: Adolf Hitler
- Grades: 10 years; 15 years; 25 years

Statistics
- First induction: 30 January 1940
- Last induction: 1945

Precedence
- Related: Wehrmacht Long Service Award; SS Long Service Award; Police Long Service Award

The Nazi Party Long Service Award (Die Dienstauszeichnung der NSDAP), a/k/a the NSDAP Long Service Award, was a political award in the form of a badge of the Nazi Party.

== History ==
The award was given in three grades of ten years, fifteen years, and twenty-five years of service. On its reverse side, each award had emblazoned the inscription, in German: Treue für Führer und Volk ("Loyalty to Leader and People"). The service award was a four-pointed cross (Ordenskreuz) cross with slightly curved arms. In the centre of the cross is the national eagle with an oak leaf wreath. Between the arms were rays, which was suspended from a 30mm ribbon. On 2 April 1939, Adolf Hitler ordered its institution for male and female members of the NSDAP who met certain qualifications. The award was first given out on 30 January 1940.

Despite the fact that the entire Nazi movement lasted a little over 25 years (1920–1945), the awards were made well before the stated years of actual service were completed. This was because the period between 1925 and January 1933 was known by the Nazis as the Kampfzeit ("Time of Struggle"). Those years counted double for the purposes of granting this award. Service in any Nazi Party organization or formation was considered eligible. The time of service had to be unbroken, with exceptions for:

- Compulsory military service, not to exceed two years time.
- Military service against the Republican Government in the Spanish Civil War (1936 to 1939).
- German military service after September 1939.

== Grades ==
=== Ten year award ===
The ten year service award was the 3rd class award. It was a bronze medal which measured 43mm and was suspended from a 30mm dark brown ribbon with two narrow white side stripes. The reverse side inscription was done in raised lettering.

=== Fifteen year award ===
It had the same design as the 3rd class award, but for cast being plated in silver, with dark blue enamel on the arms of the four-pointed cross and for the center section inside of the oak leaf wreath. The reverse side inscription was blue enamel with silver lettering. The 30mm ribbon was blue with two narrow silver-gray side stripes.

=== Twenty-five year award ===
The twenty-five year service medal was the first class award. It was of the same design as the 2nd class award, but gold plate replaced the silver plate with white enamel on the arms of the four-pointed cross and for the center section inside of the oak leaf wreath. The reverse side inscription was white enamel with gold lettering. The ribbon was 30mm and in red with the edge stripes being white and having a small gold centre stripe. This grade was on occasion awarded posthumously.

When one of these awards were given to a man, it was worn on the left breast pocket medal bar. Women recipients wore the award as a neck order or a brooch medal suspended from a 15mm ribbon. On the small ribbon bar the ribbon had a small national eagle within a wreath on the proper colour of the specific class. All three classes of this award were allowed to be worn at the same time.

The Schutzstaffel (SS), German Police and military had similar service awards. The SS Long Service Award was given in grades of four years, eight years, twelve years, and twenty-five years. The Police Long Service Award was given in grades of eight, eighteen, twenty-five, and forty years (never awarded). The award of the German armed forces, known as the Wehrmacht Long Service Award, was issued for four years (fourth class), twelve years (third class), 18 years (second class), 25 years (first class), and 40 years (1939 special class).

== Insignia ==
Medal			
Ribbon			
For	10 years	15 years	25 years

== See also ==
- Political decorations of the Nazi Party
