= Service Entry Badge of Der Stahlhelm, Bund der Frontsoldaten =

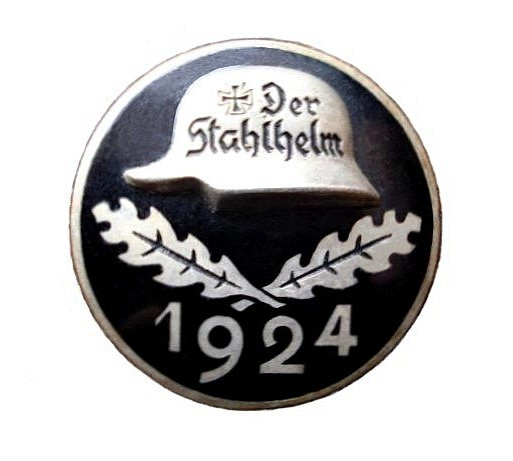
- Awarded for: "Service in Der Stahlhelm"
- Country: Germany
- Presented by: Leader of Der Stahlhelm
- First award: 13 November 1933

The Service Entry Badge (German: Diensteintrittsabzeichen des "Stahlhelms" (Bund der Frontsoldaten)) was a commemorative medal of Der Stahlhelm, Bund der Frontsoldaten (English: The Steel helmet, League of front-line Soldiers) established on 13 November 1933 by Franz Seldte. The badge was awarded to recognize Der Stahlhelm service "during the harsh years of struggle" (1918–1933).

== History ==
The Service Entry Badge displayed a German helmet above a year number, indicating the bearer's year of joining. The lowest (and most respected) number was "1918," the year of the founding of Der Stahlhelm. The badges extended upwards to the year 1932. A sleeve chevron was also available for members of Der Stahlhelm who joined the Sturmabteilung (SA). Only one badge could be awarded, and more than one badge could not be worn on the veteran's uniform.
