= Police Long Service Award =

Police service award in Nazi Germany

Police Long Service Award Polizei-Dienstauszeichnung
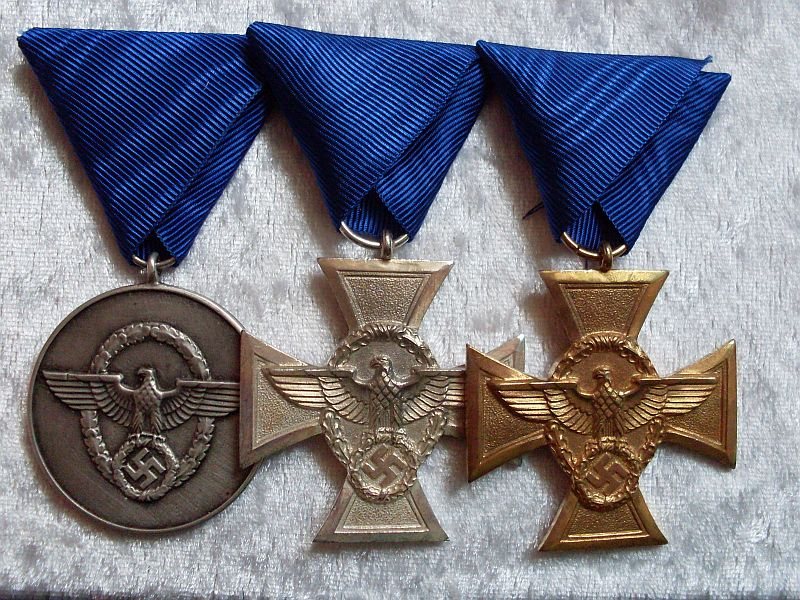
- 8, 18 & 25 year medals
- Awarded for: Long service
- Country: Nazi Germany
- Eligibility: Members of the German Police
- Motto: Für treue Dienste in der Polizei
- Status: Obsolete
- Established: 30 January 1938

The Police Long Service Award (Germany) (Polizei-Dienstauszeichnung) was a long service medal awarded to active members of the German Police during the era of Nazi Germany as a political award. Professor Richard Klein designed the awards, which varied slightly in design depending on the length of service of the recipient.

== History ==
On 30 January 1938, Adolf Hitler ordered the institution of an award for members of the police force who met qualifications based on length of service. The award was given in three grades to men who had served for eight, eighteen, and twenty-five years. The design of all three medals had the police insignia, which consisted of a national eagle emblem surrounded by a wreath, on the obverse side. All three awards were emblazoned with the inscription Für treue Dienste in der Polizei ("For faithful service in the Police") on the reverse. On 12 August 1944, a higher grade was authorized for 40 years of service. It was to be in the form of a gold metal bar with the number 40 with oak leaves, to be affixed onto the ribbon of twenty-five years award. There is no record of it being awarded prior to the end of World War II in Europe.

To qualify for the medal, a person had to be an active member of the police or "an administrator" in the police service. Military service time could also be applied to the total time of service needed for the award.

The Nazi Party, Schutzstaffel (SS) and military had similar service awards. The Nazi Party Long Service Award was given in grades of ten, fifteen, and twenty-five years. The SS Long Service Award was given in grades of four, eight, twelve, and twenty-five years. The award of the German armed forces, known as the Wehrmacht Long Service Award, was issued for four years (fourth class), twelve years (third class), 18 years (second class), 25 years (first class), and 40 years (1939 special class).

== Grades ==
=== Eight year award ===
The eight-year service award was the third class silver medal. It was a round medal measuring 38 millimetres (1.5 in) suspended from a 35-millimetre (1.4 in) wide cornflower blue ribbon. The front side had the police insignia; the reverse side had a number 8 surrounded by the inscription Für treue Dienste in der Polizei in raised lettering.

=== Eighteen year award ===
The silver eighteen-year service cross was the second class award. The design was a silver-gray four-pointed cross (Ordenskreuz) measuring 43 millimetres (1.7 in) suspended from a cornflower blue ribbon with a woven police insignia. The ribbon varied in width; some were 37 millimetres (1.5 in) and others measured 51 millimetres (2.0 in). The obverse of the medal bore the police insignia of a national eagle emblem surrounded by a wreath. The reverse side was inscribed with Für treue Dienste in der Polizei in raised lettering.

=== Twenty-five year award ===
The gold twenty-five-year service cross was the first class award. It was of the same design as the second class award but the four-pointed cross (Ordenskreuz) was of gold rather than silver. The 18 and 25 year medals both had a similar presentation case: a hinged box with an exterior of green simulated leather, but with different interiors. The top of the case had either the number 18 or 25 embossed on it. The inside top lid of the case was white satin and the lower portion was velvet.

== Insignia ==
Medal				
Ribbon				
For	8 years	18 years	25 years	40 years

== See also ==
- Ordnungspolizei
- Kurt Daluege
- Political decorations of the Nazi Party
