= Gau Saxony =

Administrative division of Nazi Germany

- Gau of Nazi Germany
- 1925–1945
- Flag Coat of arms

- Map of Nazi Germany showing its administrative subdivisions (Gaue and Reichsgaue).
- Capital: Dresden
- Government
- Gauleiter
  - 1926–1945: Martin Mutschmann
- History
  - Establishment: 16 May 1925
  - Disestablishment: 8 May 1945
Preceded by	Succeeded by
Free State of Saxony (Weimar Republic)	State of Saxony (1945–1952); Polish People's Republic
- Today part of: Germany; Poland

The Gau Saxony (German: Gau Sachsen) was an administrative division of Nazi Germany from 1933 to 1945 in the German state of Saxony. Before that, from 1925 to 1933, it was the regional subdivision of the Nazi Party in that area.

== History ==
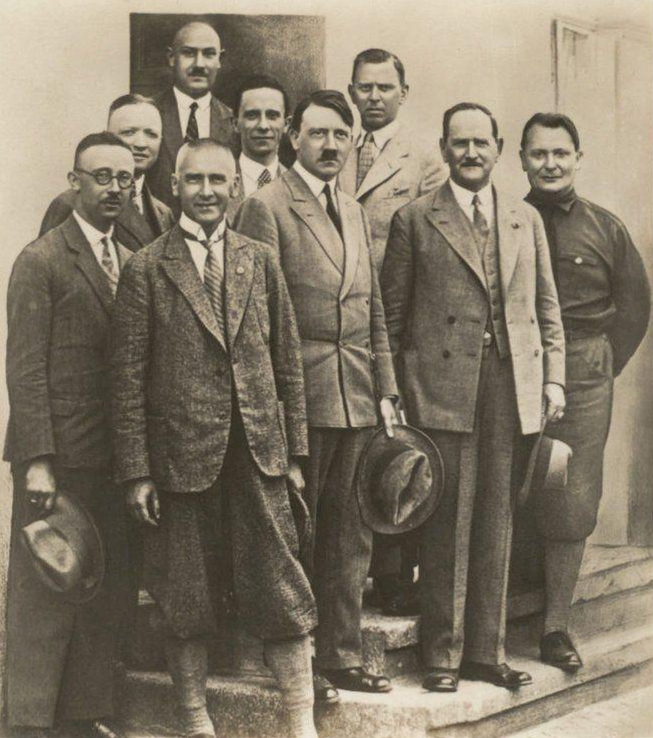
Left to right: Himmler; Mutschmann (behind Himmler); Frick; Goebbels, Hitler; Schaub, Epp, Goering in Bad Elser c. 1930

The Nazi Gau (plural Gaue) system was originally established in a party conference on 22 May 1926, in order to improve administration of the party structure. From 1933 onward, after the Nazi seizure of power, the Gaue increasingly replaced the German states as administrative subdivisions in Germany.

At the head of each Gau stood a Gauleiter, a position which became increasingly more powerful, especially after the outbreak of the Second World War, with little interference from above. Local Gauleiters often held government positions as well as party ones and were in charge of, among other things, propaganda and surveillance and, from September 1944 onward, the Volkssturm and the defense of the Gau.

Gau Saxony was established on 16 May 1926 by the merger of Gau Saxony and Gau East Saxony. The position of Gauleiter in Saxony was held by Martin Mutschmann from its formation in 1926 to 1945. Mutschmann, a powerful figure in Nazi Germany and well connected to Adolf Hitler, was arrested by German police shortly after the war and handed over to the Soviet Union. He was incarcerated in the Lubyanka prison in Moscow, tried and executed there on 14 February 1947.

The Jewish and Polish inhabitants of the province were persecuted. In 1938, the Polish Jews were expelled, however, the Polish Consulate in Leipzig sheltered 1,300 Polish Jews, preventing their deportation. During the German invasion of Poland at the start of World War II, in September 1939, the Gestapo carried out mass arrests of Polish activists in Dresden and Leipzig, and seized the Polish Consulate in Leipzig and its library, which was a violation of international law. In 1941, the American Consulate in Leipzig was also closed by order of the German authorities. Numerous subcamps of the Buchenwald, Flossenburg and Gross-Rosen concentration camps were operated in the province.

== See also ==
- Gauliga Sachsen, the highest association football league in the Gau from 1933 to 1945
