= Employee and Worker Faithful Service Medal =

- Type: Service Medal
- Awarded for: "50 years or more of Faithful Service"
- Presented by: Nazi Germany
- Eligibility: Employees and workers of Private Firms
- Status: Obsolete
- First award: Unknown
- Final award: Unknown

Highlights
- Total: Unknown
- Total awarded posthumously: No
- Total recipients: Unknown

Precedence
- Next (higher): Civil Service Faithful Service Medal In Silver
- Next (lower): NSDAP 25 Years Service Medal

The Employee and Worker Faithful Service Medal (German: Treudienst-Ehrenzeichen fur Angestellte und Arbeiter der freien Wirtschaft) was founded on January 30, 1938, as a special class to the Civil Service Faithful Service Medal to reward long and faithful service of employees of private firms who worked for the same concern for a period of 50 years or more. The medal is a silver cross with a gold wreath and a gold 50 at the top arm of the cross. The reverse has "Für Treue Arbeit" (For Faithful Work) stamped on it.

The ribbon for the medal is cornflower blue.

There is some debate in the collector community whether this medal was ever awarded or not.
