= SS Long Service Award =

SS Service award in Nazi Germany (1938–1945)

SS Long Service Award SS-Dienstauszeichnungen
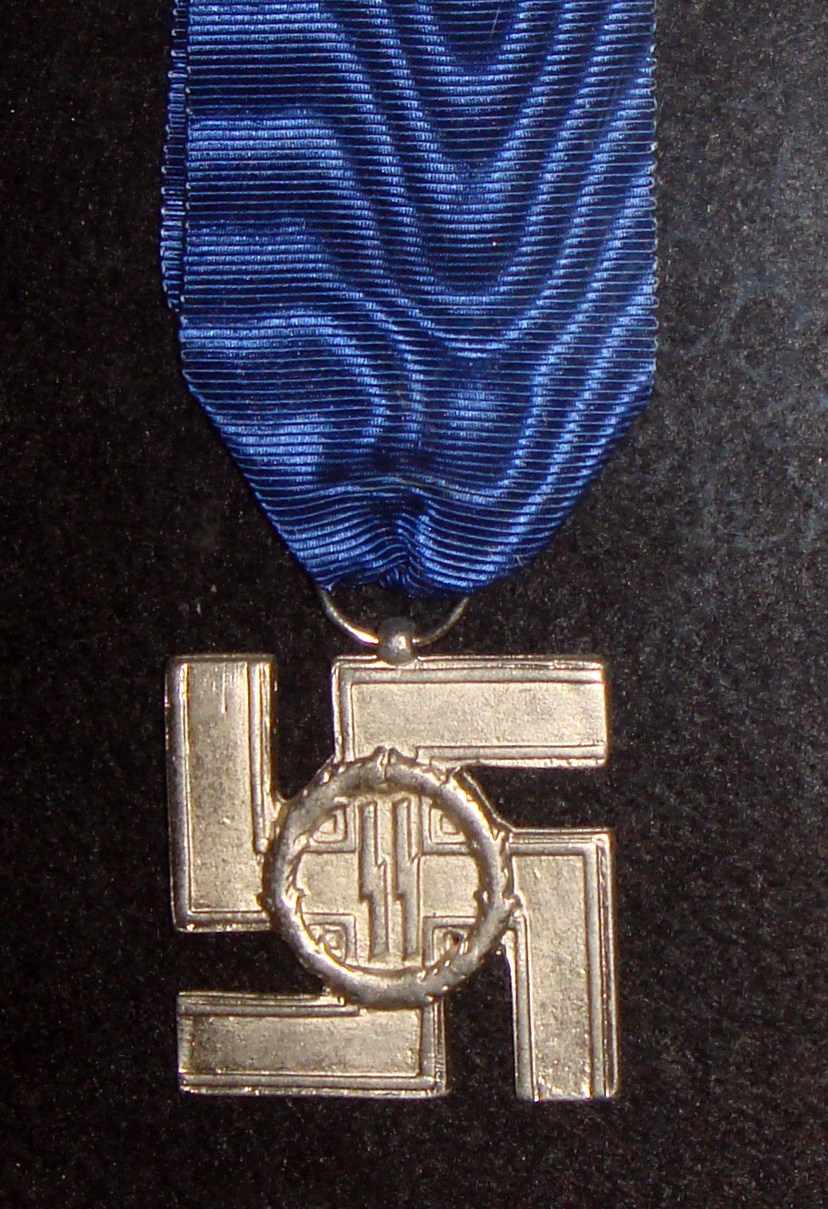
- 12 year award
- Type: Medal
- Awarded for: Long service in the Schutzstaffel
- Presented by: Nazi Germany
- Motto: Für treue dienste in der ᛋᛋ
- Status: Obsolete
- Established: 30 January 1938
- Final award: 1941

SS Long Service Awards (German: SS-Dienstauszeichnungen) were medals that were given in grades of four years, eight years, twelve years, and twenty-five years. The four and eight-year service awards were in the form of circular medals while the 12 and 25-year service awards were in the form of swastikas. The SS service awards were designed in Munich by Professor Karl Diebitsch. The awards varied in design depending on the length of service of the recipient.

== History ==
It was first introduced by Adolf Hitler on 30 January 1938, On its reverse side, each award had emblazoned the inscription, in German: FÜR TREUE DIENSTE IN DER ᛋᛋ ("For Loyal Service in the Schutzstaffel (SS). The medal was awarded to SS members in the SS-Verfügungstruppe, SS-Totenkopfverbände who were on active service. The Nazi Party and German police had similar service awards. The Nazi Party Long Service Award was given in grades of ten, fifteen, and twenty-five years. The Police Long Service Award was given in grades of eight, eighteen, twenty-five, and forty years (approved but never awarded).

The four-year and eight-year awards were the most common awards. Despite the fact that the whole Nazi movement lasted for little over 25 years (1920–1945) and the SS were founded only in 1925, awards of the 25-year version were made well before 25 years of actual service were completed. This was because the period between 1925 and 1933 (what the Nazis termed Kampfzeit ("Time of Struggle") counted double, and any service in the Imperial German armed forces in the First World War and afterwards, as well as the police, was also included. The awards ceased to be given at the end of 1941.

== Grades ==
- The four-year service award had a black finish and was awarded only to NCOs and enlisted men. The four-year service medal was manufactured by the firm Petz & Lorenz.
- The eight-year service award was finished in bronze and was awarded to all Officers, NCOs and enlisted men. The eight-year service medal was manufactured by the firm Deschler.
- The twelve-year service award was in the shape of the swastika, had a silver finish and was awarded to all Officers, NCOs and enlisted men.
- The twenty-five-year service award was in the shape of the swastika, had a gold finish and was awarded to all Officers, NCOs and enlisted men.

| Medal | | | | |
| Ribbon | | | | |
| For | 4 years | 8 years | 12 years | 25 year |

== See also ==
- Political decorations of the Nazi Party
