= Frontbann =

Front organisation of the Nazi paramilitary SA

- Dates active: April 1924–February 27, 1925
- Country: Weimar Republic
- Size: 30,000

The term Frontbann (lit. 'Front Regiment') refers to a reorganized front organization of the Sturmabteilung or SA which was formed in April 1924. It was created to replace the SA which had been banned in the aftermath of the failed Munich Putsch. It was disbanded in February 1925 after the ban on the SA was lifted.

== History ==
The Frontbann was a reorganized and renamed version of the SA. It was created in April 1924 as a substitute for the then banned SA in the aftermath of the failed "Beer Hall Putsch" of November 1923. The Nazi Party (NSDAP) including the SA was outlawed by the Weimar Republic government following the putsch. The Nazi Party was briefly renamed the National Socialist Freedom Party to maintain its legality and the SA was similarly renamed. Like the party it served, the Frontbann included the same members and performed the same functions as its predecessor. It contained many of the original members of the SA and was still led by Ernst Röhm. Frontbann units were formed throughout Germany. Kurt Daluege was the leader of the Frontbann unit in Berlin and Martin Bormann was a member of the unit in Thüringen. It had about 30,000 members across Germany. The Frontbann ceased its primary political activity on February 27, 1925 when the ban was lifted on the Nazi Party and was reformed back into the SA, but continued to exist administratively—in the process of being wound up—until the autumn of 1925; its final commander, Graf von Helldorff, was responsible for signing the document that formally dissolved the organization and integrated it into the formal structure of National Socialism.

=== The uniform ===
The Frontbann uniform was similar to the Nazi Party SA uniform. Instead of a brown shirt and brown cap, they wore a field grey shirt with a grey cap; otherwise, it was the same. The arm band was essentially the same as that of the Nazi Party. The only change was the placement of a steel helmet at the centre of the red brassard, instead of the black swastika.

== Frontbann badge ==
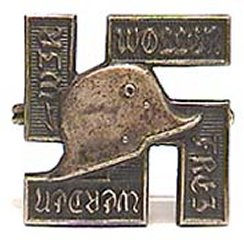
The Frontbann badge, worn until 1934. The motto on the swastika behind the helmet reads "Wir wollen frei werden" ("We want to be free").

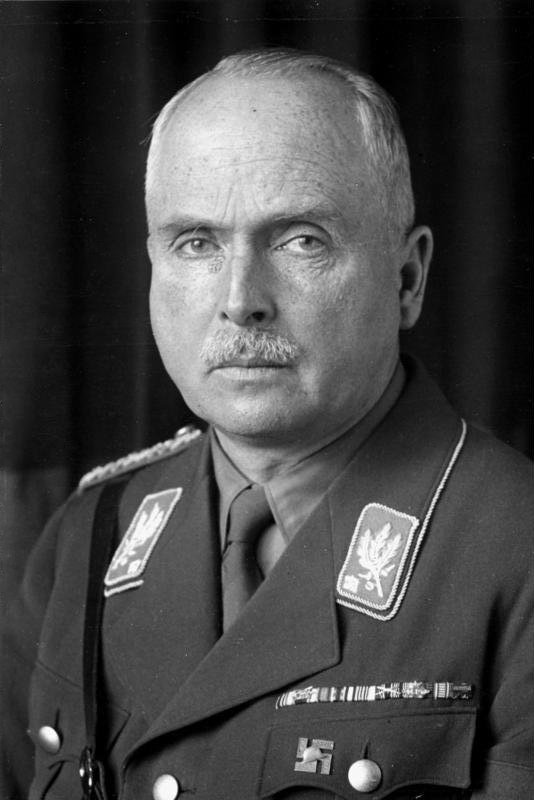
Charles Edward, Duke of Saxe-Coburg and Gotha wearing the Frontbann Badge in 1933

The Frontbann Badge (Frontbannabzeichen), was established in 1932 by the SA-Gruppe-Berlin-Brandenburg. It was a badge to commemorate the Frontbann. To be able to obtain and wear the badge, one had to have joined the Frontbann prior to December 31, 1927 and had membership in the Nazi Party or another right-wing paramilitary organisation prior to that date. The badge was silver in color, had a pin back and measured 20 mm. It consisted of a swastika with a Stahlhelm in the middle; written on the arms of the swastika were the words, WIR WOLLEN FREI WERDEN ("We want to be free"). It was listed as an official decoration of the Nazi Party in 1933. By the end of 1934 the authorization was removed. It was no longer a badge that could be worn by NSDAP members.

== See also ==
- Political decorations of the Nazi Party
