= SA Sports Badge =

SA Sports Badge SA-Sportabzeichen
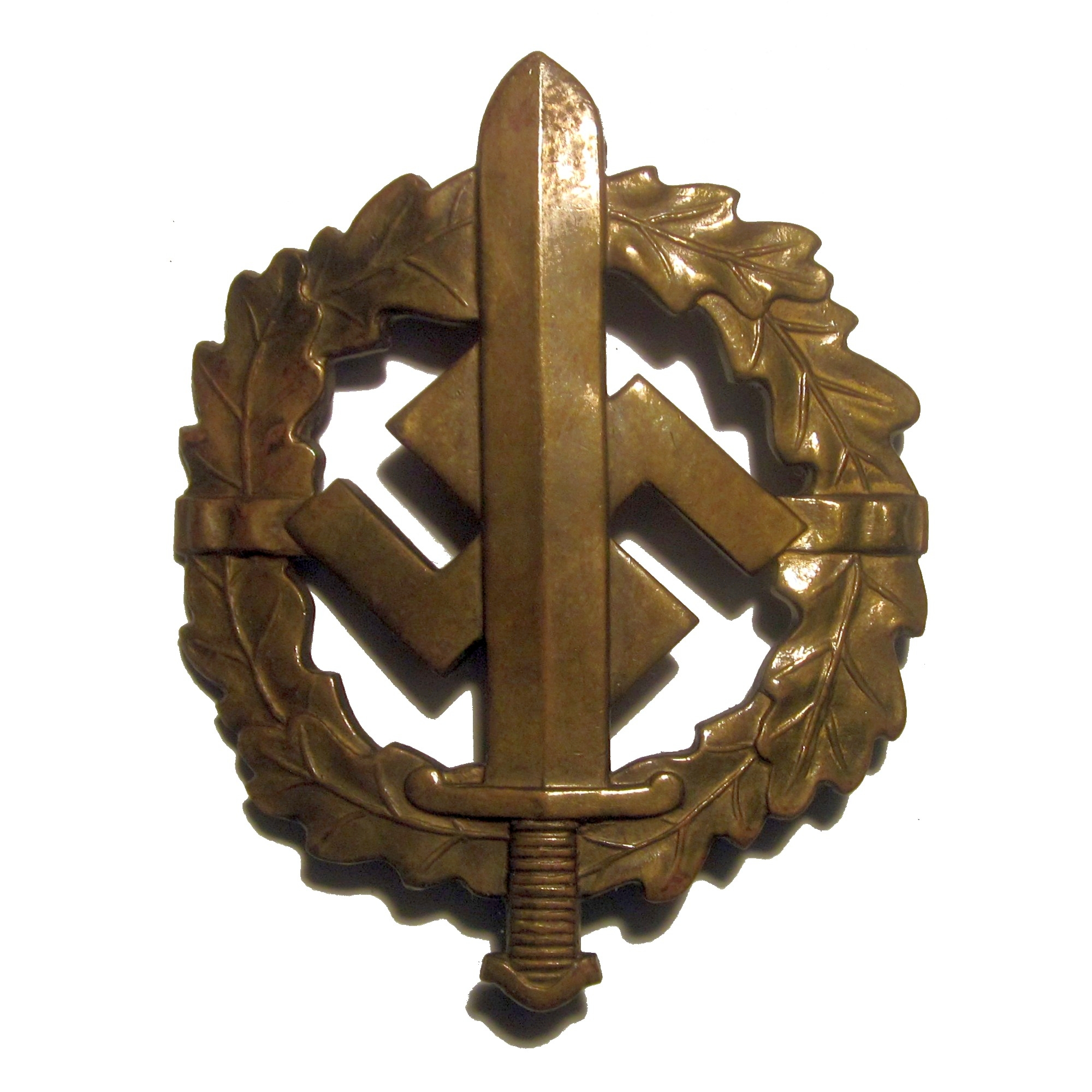
- Sports Badge of the Sturmabteilung
- Type: Badge
- Awarded for: physical fitness
- Presented by: Nazi Germany
- Eligibility: German military and paramilitary organizations
- Status: No longer awarded
- Established: 1933

The SA Sports Badge (German: SA-Sportabzeichen) was a decoration of Nazi Germany that was issued between the years 1933 and 1945. It was a political version of the much more generic German Sports Badge, which was also issued in great numbers by the Nazis. At its center was a 57mm high Roman broad sword, superimposed over a Nazi swastika encircled by a wreath of oak leaves. It was a pin-back badge, but there was a cloth version, as well.

The SA Sports Badge was instituted on 28 November 1933 by then SA chief Ernst Röhm. It was originally only issued in bronze through the year 1935. On 15 February 1935, Hitler decreed that the badge be officially recognized. It was thereafter issued in three grades (bronze, silver, and gold). No longer was the physical fitness badge to be awarded only to SA members, but to youth of all German military and paramilitary organizations. Originally the badge grade was awarded on degrees of "proficiency". Then in 1936, a points system was established. In 1937, the requirement for the holder of the award was upgraded; each recipient had to pass an annual proficiency test to retain the badge.

On 19 January 1939, Hitler changed the name of the badge from SA-Sportabzeichen (SA Sports Badge) to SA-Wehrabzeichen (SA-Defence Badge). Hitler challenged all able-bodied boys age 16 and up to compete for the award. Older military men were also encouraged to obtain it. The badge was one of the few political decorations that the armed forces allowed to freely be displayed on a military uniform. By December 1936, one million had been awarded, and by the end of 1943, over 2.5 million had been awarded.

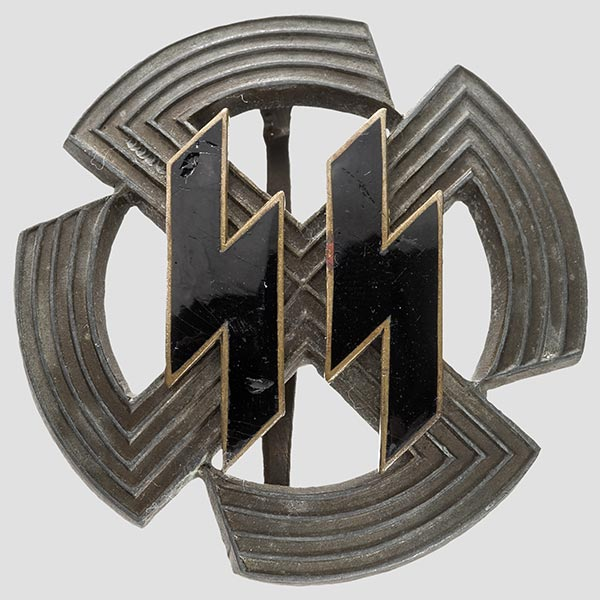
Germanic Proficiency Runes

The physical fitness programme was divided into three sections, gymnastics, defensive sports and agricultural service. The badge was to be worn on the left breast, under the Iron Cross.

By 1943, a similar sports badge had been created for non-Germans who were part of the Germanic-SS and Waffen-SS. Known as the Germanic Proficiency Runes (German: Germanische Leistungsrune), this award was issued in two grades (bronze and silver) with similar physical tests as those required for the SA Sports Badge.

== Grades ==
- The Bronze SA Sport/Defence Badge was awarded to those who had successfully passed an educational and physical programme.
- The Silver SA Sport/Defence Badge was awarded to those who held the Bronze badge for five years and had participated and passed the annual requirements and also having passed the age of 35.
- The Gold SA Sport/Defence Badge was awarded to those who held the Silver badge for six years and successfully participated in the annual requirements and were over 40 years old.
