= Gau Düsseldorf =

Administrative division of Nazi Germany

- Gau of Nazi Germany
- 1930–1945
- Flag

- Gau Düsseldorf on the left, bordering The Netherlands
- Capital: Düsseldorf
- Area
- 2,700 km^{2} (1,000 sq mi)
- Population
- 2,200,000
- Government
- Gauleiter
  - 1930–1945: Friedrich Karl Florian
- History
  - Establishment: 1 August 1930
  - Allied capture of Düsseldorf and destruction of the Ruhr pocket: 18 April 1945
Preceded by	Succeeded by
Rhine Province	North Rhine-Westphalia
- Today part of: Germany

The Gau Düsseldorf was an administrative division of Nazi Germany from 1933 to 1945 in the Düsseldorf region of the Prussian Rhine Province. Before that, from 1930 to 1933, it was the regional subdivision of the Nazi Party in that area.

== History ==
=== Establishment and government ===
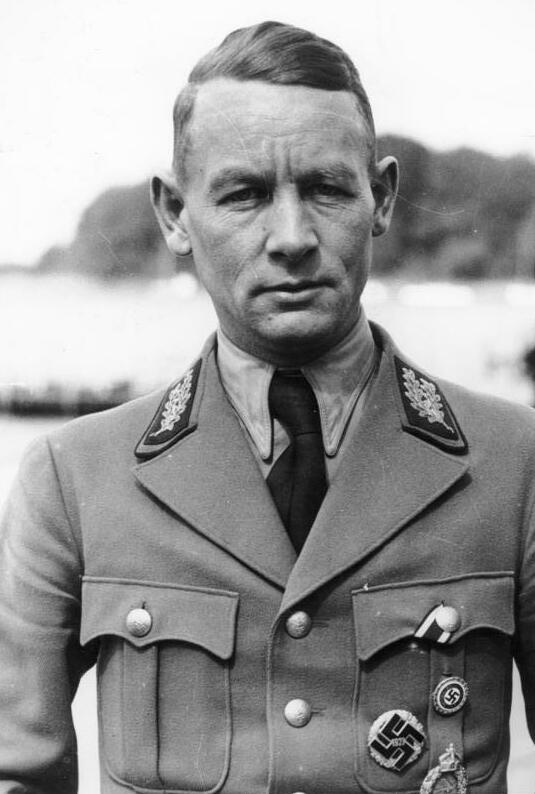
Friedrich Karl Florian, Gauleiter of Gau Düsseldorf.

The Nazi Gau (plural Gaue) system was originally established in a party conference on 22 May 1926, in order to improve administration of the party structure. From 1933 onward, after the Nazi seizure of power, the Gaue increasingly replaced the German states as administrative subdivisions in Germany. The region had originally belonged to the Gau Ruhr, initially led by Joseph Goebbels, became part of the Gau Westphalia in 1928 before becoming its own Gau in August 1930.

At the head of each Gau stood a Gauleiter, a position which became increasingly more powerful, especially after the outbreak of the Second World War, with little interference from above. Local Gauleiters often held government positions as well as party ones and were in charge of, among other things, propaganda and surveillance and, from September 1944 onward, the Volkssturm and the defense of the Gau.

=== Interwar period ===
The position of Gauleiter in Düsseldorf was held by Friedrich Karl Florian throughout the history of the Gau from 1930 to 1945.

On 10 November 1938, Florian played an active part in the Kristallnacht pogrom in Düsseldorf, leading SA and Hitler Youth in attacking the home of the Regierungspräsident Carl Christian Schmid, whose wife was Jewish. In the city-wide attacks on Jewish homes and businesses, five persons were killed and hundreds were injured or left homeless.

=== World War II ===
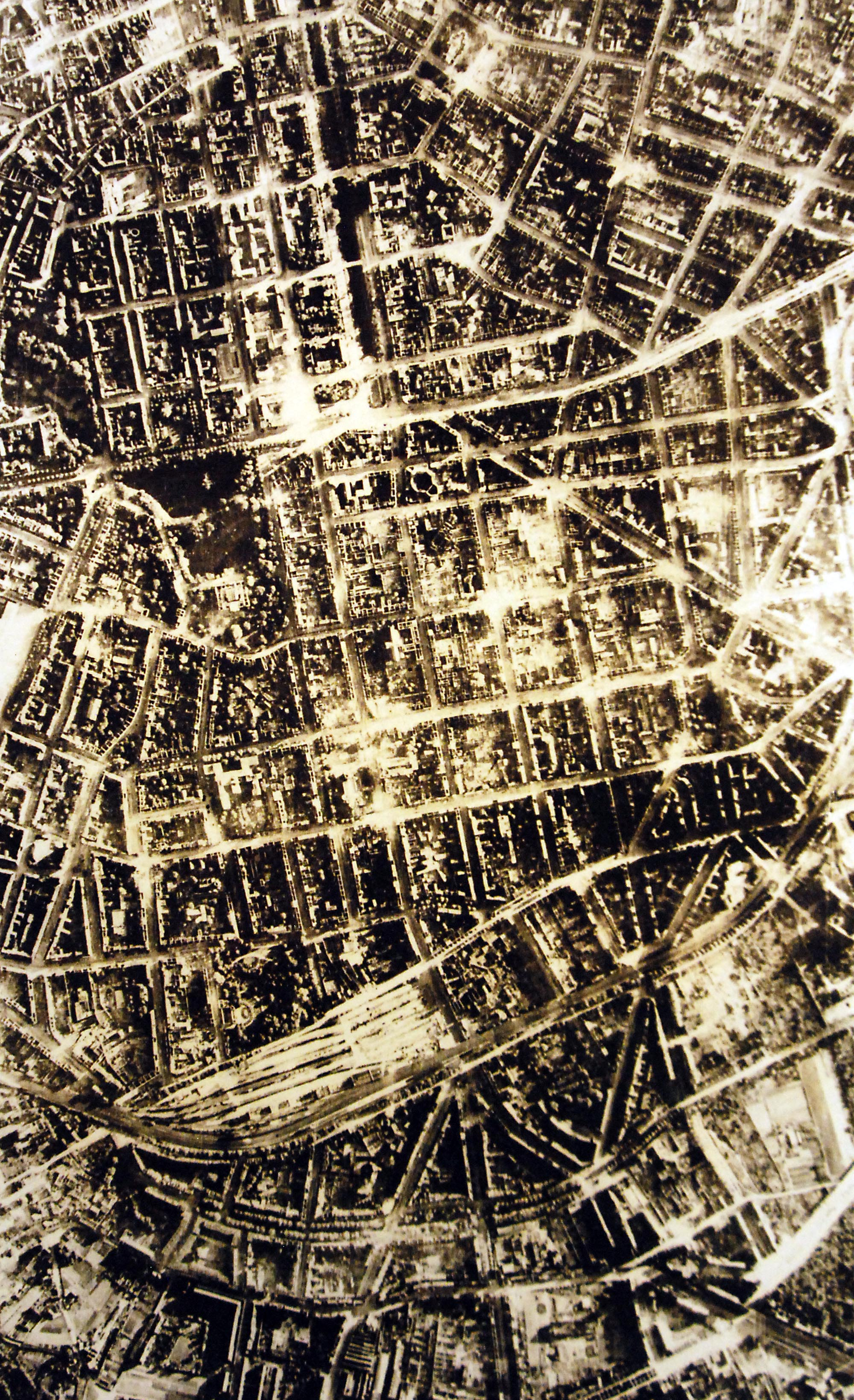
Aerial view of the destruction in Düsseldorf one week after the air raid on 12 June 1943.

On 16 November 1942, Florian was named Reich Defense Commissioner for his Gau and in October 1944 he was made head of the Düsseldorf Volkssturm contingent.

Throughout the war, the Gau's capital Düsseldorf was heavily destroyed by allied aerial bombardment. The most severe attack occurred on 12 June 1943, when a firestorm was ignited through targeted bombing by the British Royal Air Force, largely destroying the historical city center, downtown, and other adjacent neighborhoods.

At the end of February 1945, the allies invaded the Gau, with Schwalmtal and Jüchen, in the south of the Gau, being among the first settlements occupied. In early March, the allies occupied all the Gau's territories of west of the Rhine, though the river served as a natural defensive boundary and stalled further allied advance into the Gau for several weeks. After the allies secured a new bridgehead in the Battle of Remagen (7–25 March 1945), further advance became possible.

On 23 March 1945, Florian and two other Gauleiters from the industrial Ruhr area (Albert Hoffmann and Fritz Schlessmann) met with Reichsminister of Armaments and War Production Albert Speer. Speer tried to convince them to ignore Adolf Hitler’s Nero Decree mandating a scorched earth policy ahead of the Allied armies’ advance. A rabid Nazi, Florian alone argued in favor of the policy. He read aloud a proclamation he intended to issue ordering the evacuation of the population of Düsseldorf and setting fire to all buildings, leaving the Allies a burned-out, deserted city. However, in the end, he did not issue the proclamation and was unable to implement these drastic actions before the Allies captured the city.

The German-held territory inside the Gau would become surrounded by the allies on 1 April and form the Ruhr pocket. Initially encompassing areas from not only Gau Düsseldorf but also Gau Cologne-Aachen, Gau Westphalia-South, Gau Westphalia-North, and Gau Essen, the Ruhr pocket underwent a significant reduction over the next weeks due to the allied advance. Eventually, by 15 April, the pocket had contracted to include only Gau Düsseldorf. On 18 April 1945, Düsseldorf, the Gau's capital, was taken with the help of a local anti-Nazi resistance group led by Karl August Wiedenhofen which launched Aktion Rheinland, and the last resistance in the pocket was finally eliminated that same day.

A timeline of the allied advance is listed below.

Date of capture	Location	Reference
28 February 1945	Schwalmtal	
28 February 1945	Jüchen	
28 February to early March 1945	Grevenbroich	
1 March 1945	Kaldenkirchen	
1 March 1945	Mönchengladbach	
1 March 1945	Brüggen	
1 March 1945	Viersen	
1 March 1945	Schiefbahn	
1 March 1945	Anrath	
1 March 1945	Kaarst	
2 March 1945	Kempen	
2 March 1945	Grefrath	
2 March 1945	Neuss	
2 March 1945	Krefeld	
3 March 1945	Rommerskirchen	
5 March 1945	Dormagen	
14 April 1945	Leverkusen	
14 April 1945	Wermelskirchen	
15-16 April 1945	Wuppertal	
16 April 1945	Mettmann	
16 April 1945	Langenberg	
16 April 1945	Neviges	
16-17 April 1945	Solingen	
17 April 1945	Heiligenhaus	
17 April 1945	Velbert	
17 April 1945	Ratingen	
18 April 1945	Düsseldorf	

=== Aftermath ===
Captured by US forces on 17 April 1945 and interned at the Esterwegen concentration camp, Florian made two suicide attempts while in custody, by poison and by jumping out a third-floor window. He was charged with ordering the execution of five Düsseldorf citizens who in April 1945 had attempted to surrender the city to the US Army, but was acquitted in March 1949. Shortly afterwards in June 1949, Florian was convicted by the denazification court and was sentenced to six years in prison and a 20,000 Reichsmark fine because of his leadership role in the Nazi Party. Taking into consideration time served, he was released on 1 May 1951. He then found employment as an industrial representative. He remained a convinced Nazi and maintained contact with former associates from the Nazi era. According to information obtained by British intelligence, he was a close collaborator of Werner Naumann in the organization known as the Naumann Circle that attempted to infiltrate political parties in West Germany in the early 1950s.

== Geography and demographics ==
The Gau had a size of 2,700 km^{2} (2,741 sq mi) and a population of 2,200,000, which placed it in mid-table for size and population in the list of Gaue.

== Sources ==
- Klee, Ernst (2007). Das Personenlexikon zum Dritten Reich. Wer war was vor und nach 1945. Frankfurt-am-Main: Fischer-Taschenbuch-Verlag. ISBN 978-3-596-16048-8.
- Miller, Michael; Schulz, Andreas (2012). Gauleiter: The Regional Leaders of the Nazi Party and Their Deputies, 1925-1945, Vol. 1. R. James Bender Publishing. ISBN 978-1-932970-21-0.
- Speer, Albert (1970). Inside the Third Reich. New York: Avon Books. ISBN 978-0-380-00071-5.
