= Viennet =

Viennet is a surname. Notable people with the surname include:

- Émilien Viennet (born 1992), French cyclist
- Jacques Joseph Viennet (1734–1824), French politician
- Jean-Pons-Guillaume Viennet (1777–1868), French politician
