= Edwin Benbow =

British World War I flying ace (1895–1918)

Edwin Louis Benbow
- Born: 10 December 1895; Abbotsbury, Dorset, England
- Died: 30 May 1918 (aged 22)
- Burial place: Duhallow ADS Cemetery, Ypres, West Flanders, Belgium
- Military career
- Allegiance: United Kingdom
- Branch: British Army; Royal Air Force
- Service years: 1915–1918
- Rank: Captain
- Nickname: Lobo
- Units: Royal Field Artillery; No. 40 Squadron RFC; No. 85 Squadron RAF
- Awards: Military Cross

Captain Edwin Louis Benbow MC (10 December 1895 – 30 May 1918) was an English flying ace during the First World War, credited with eight victories, comprising six destroyed and one shared destroyed, and one 'out of control'. He was the only pilot to gain 'ace' status flying the Royal Aircraft Factory F.E.8 exclusively.

== Family ==
His father Joseph was the head gardener for the Ilchester Estate in Abbotsbury, having been born on 6 March 1864 in Ombersley, Worcestershire. Joseph married German-born British subject Jane Caroline Brommer in 1886, in Nice, France, and their first child William was born in Cannes, in 1889. William died in Abbotsbury in 1918, and is buried in the churchyard there. Edwin was born in 1895 in Abbotsbury where his father is listed as 'Head Gardener (Not Domestic)' in the 1901 Census.

== Wartime career ==
Benbow joined the Royal Field Artillery in February 1915, and served for a year being commissioned a second lieutenant on 27 May 1915. He was appointed to be a flying officer (observer), effective 10 March 1916, before being seconded to the Royal Flying Corps on 15 April 1916. He served his first eight months in aviation as an observer/gunner. He then trained as a pilot, was appointed a flying officer on 7 July 1916, and was assigned to 40 Squadron as an F.E.8 pilot. He achieved all his successes while with this squadron; on 20 October 1916, using F.E.8, Serial No. 7627, he destroyed an Albatros D.II for his first victory. Two days later he set a German two-seater afire over Vimy.

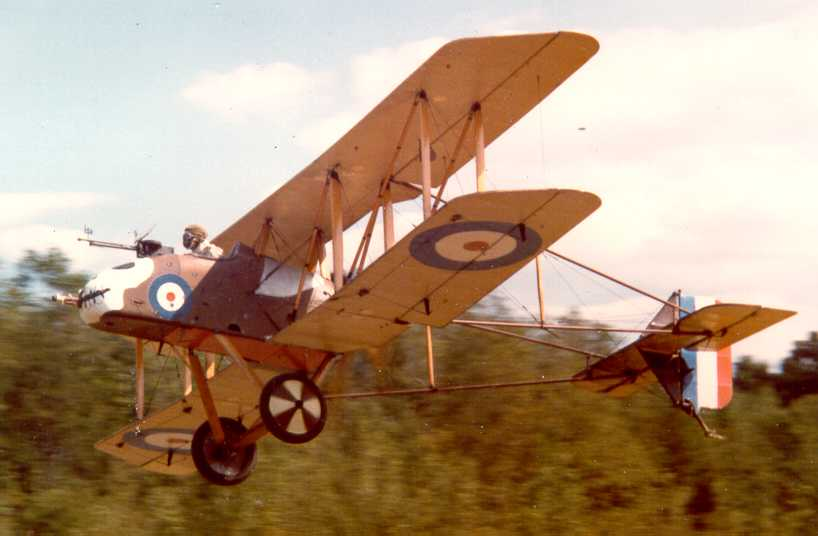
A modern F.E.8 reproduction in flight.

On 16 November 1916 Benbow shot down an Albatros two-seater. On 4 December he downed another Albatros D.II. On the 20th, he felled another Albatros two-seater; Benbow thus became the only F.E.8 ace, and No. 7627 the only Royal Aircraft Factory F.E.8 to be involved in the shooting down of five or more enemy aircraft.

On the early afternoon of 23 January 1917, Benbow was in the midst of a dogfight when his gun jammed. While clearing his weapon, he evaded a head-on assault by the Red Baron, who went on to down Benbow's squadron comrade Lt. J. Hay for Jasta 11's first victory. Benbow did not succeed in returning to the attack on that occasion, but on 14 February using F.E.8 Serial No. A4871, he destroyed another Albatros D.II. His seventh victory came the following day, with Benbow's only "out of control" claim.

On 6 March, Benbow and the Red Baron clashed again when nine F.E.8s of 40 Squadron fought five Jasta 11 aircraft led by Richthofen. While the Baron was attacking a Sopwith 1½ Strutter, Benbow shot him down, forcing him to land near Hénin-Liétard with a damaged engine, spraying fuel from holed tanks, and seemingly on fire, for Benbow's eighth victory (although Richthofen survived). On 12 March, 40 Squadron began its re-equipment with Nieuport 17 "tractors". A week later, Benbow was wounded in action by anti-aircraft shrapnel, ending his first combat assignment in France.

Benbow would serve as an instructor in his time away from the front. He was appointed a Flight Commander with the concomitant rank of Temporary Captain on 31 March 1917, and posted to Billy Bishop's No. 85 Squadron in May 1918. On the 30th while piloting Royal Aircraft Factory S.E.5a, Serial No.C1861, he was shot down and killed by Hans-Eberhardt Gandert of Jasta 51.

== Honours and awards ==
Military Cross
2nd Lt. (temp. Lt.) Edwin Louis Benbow, Royal Field Artillery and Royal Flying Corps.
For conspicuous gallantry in action. He has on several occasions displayed great courage and skill, and has destroyed four enemy machines under difficult conditions.

== Bibliography ==
- Guttman, Jon; Dempsey, Harry (2009). Pusher Aces of World War I. Osprey Pub. Co. ISBN 978-1-84603-417-6.
- Shores, Christopher F.; Franks, Norman & Guest, Russell F. (1990). Above the Trenches: a Complete Record of the Fighter Aces and Units of the British Empire Air Forces 1915–1920. London, UK: Grub Street. ISBN 978-0-948817-19-9.
