= Aktion Rheinland =

Surrender of Düsseldorf in WWII

Aktion Rheinland (German for Operation Rhineland) was an operation carried out by the Anti-Nazi resistance group in Düsseldorf led by Karl August Wiedenhofen. The goal was to surrender the city of Düsseldorf to the advancing Americans without any fighting, thereby preventing further destruction. The action occurred on 17 April 1945, during the latter stages of the encirclement of the Ruhr Pocket.

== The situation in April 1945 ==
The Second World War seemed to be lost for Germany by early April 1945. The Allied invasion had taken place, the Wehrmacht was defeated and was in retreat. Since May 1940 Allied air raids had killed more than 500,000 civilians, and damaged or destroyed 90 percent of the buildings. On 12 June 1943, they had deliberately ignited a firestorm. By April 1945 further warfare appeared hopeless to many in the population.

Düsseldorf had been a front-line city until the end of February 1945. By early March American troops – part of the 83rd Infantry Division – had occupied the neighbouring city of Neuss and the left bank of the Rhine in Düsseldorf. Gauleiter of NSDAP and Reich Defense Commissioner Friedrich Karl Florian had ordered a scorched earth policy. All utilities and transportation were to be blown up including the Rhine bridge crossings, and the population of Düsseldorf was to be evacuated. The city was under constant attack and was completely encircled by 10 April 1945.

== The group led by Wiedenhofen ==
Since the 1930s a group of dissenters had met in Gerresheim, one of Düsseldorf's 43 boroughs. Among them were Aloys Odenthal, an architect, and Theodor Winkens a baker and pastry chef, but who had been a clerk at police headquarters, and the lawyer Karl Müller. Odenthal had firm Christian convictions. He had been interrogated twice by the Gestapo for his dissident statements, who threatened him with detention in a concentration camp. Winkens had been sacked as a clerk at the police headquarters in 1938 because he refused to divorce his wife, a Jew.

Another group of opponents of Nazism was led by the lawyer Karl August Wiedenhofen. The Wiedenhofen group included the engineer and businessman Josef Knab and master craftsman Ernst Klein, Josef Lauxtermann and Karl Kleppe. In the summer of 1944 Otto Goetsch joined the Wiedenhofen group. Although Goetsch was a high official and member of the NSDAP, he was opposed to Nazism.

In 1943 the two groups began to meet twice a month to plan. Their common goal was the liberation of Germany from Nazism. No actions, however were actually carried out.

== Development and implementation of Aktion Rheinland ==
Because of the worsening conditions in Düsseldorf the group decided to take action on 15 February 1945. They began preparing for a bloodless surrender of the city to the advancing Allies. The first step in their plan was the elimination of the Nazi leadership of the police. The police themselves were believed to be the only trustworthy armed organization capable of implementing further action. The commander of the police, Franz Jürgens, had recently vehemently rejected the command of a battle group of police and Volkssturm and it was thought that he would be sympathetic to their objectives. They met with him only days before taking action on the 16th of April. Theodor Andresen and Hermann Weill were also recruited at this time.

The action, now known as "Aktion Rheinland" was implemented 16 April. Odenthal, Wiedenhofen, Knab, Müller and Andresen met at police headquarters with Jürgens. Captain Gehrke, Jürgens deputy, was recruited to the cause. The Düsseldorf police chief, SS Brigade Commander August Korreng, was taken prisoner, and Jürgens took full command of the police. The Deputy Commissioner Goetsch and Lieutenant Colonel Juergens prepared a pass authorizing Wiedenhofen as negotiator for the city of Düsseldorf.

A short time later, the plan was betrayed, and Korreng was freed by a raiding party consisting of NSDAP Gauleiter Friedrich Karl Florian and Wehrmacht soldiers during the late afternoon. Part of the resistance group managed to escape, the others were detained at the police headquarters. Goetsch was among those able to escape and hid with Karl Müller. On 18 April, he surrendered to the Americans.

On the afternoon of 16 April, August Wiedenhofen and Aloys Odenthal reached the American lines near Mettmann, and were able, after long negotiations, to surrender the city without further combat. An air raid by 800 bombers, which was scheduled for 17 April at 1:10 am, was stopped literally at the last minute. The next day the American 97th Infantry Division marched into Düsseldorf, unopposed. Odenthal and Wiedenhofen rode on the tanks and brought them to the police headquarters.

However during the previous night, Jürgens, Andresen, Kleppe, Knab and Weill were convicted in state court for treason and sentenced to death. Of the captured conspirators, only Gehrke was acquitted. The rest were executed in the yard of the vocational school Färberstraße. They were immediately buried but on the first of June 1945 their bodies were exhumed. Subsequent autopsies determined that Knab and Andresen had suffered serious abuse. Former SS Brigade commander Korreng committed suicide on 7 June 1945.

== After the war ==
The death sentences of the state court proceedings were repeatedly subject to judicial review and ultimately found by the Federal Court as lawful. Only in 1999 were they cancelled because of the law abolishing Nazi judgements.

The resistance fighters involved received numerous honours. The executed were buried in graves of honour at the Düsseldorf North Cemetery, the Gerresheimer Forest Cemetery and the Stoffeler Cemetery, memorials were built and named streets and squares after them. Aloys Odenthal received honorary citizenship of Düsseldorf in 1985.

On 17 April 2011, the Weg der Befreiung ("Path of Liberation") was inaugurated by Mayor Dirk Elbers, consisting of six pillars, which are installed at points marking the journey taken by Odenthal and Wiedenhofen from the city police headquarters to reach US forces near Mettman.

The commemoration of Franz Jürgens has since drawn controversy due to his involvement in war crimes. As the head of the police in Darmstadt, Jürgens, a member of the Nazi Party since 1933, was complicit in the mass deportations of 500 German Jews to extermination camps. German Jewish groups have called for officials to stop honoring Franz Jürgens.

== See also ==
- German resistance to Nazism
- Ruhr Pocket
