= Étienne Maurice Gérard =

French general and statesman

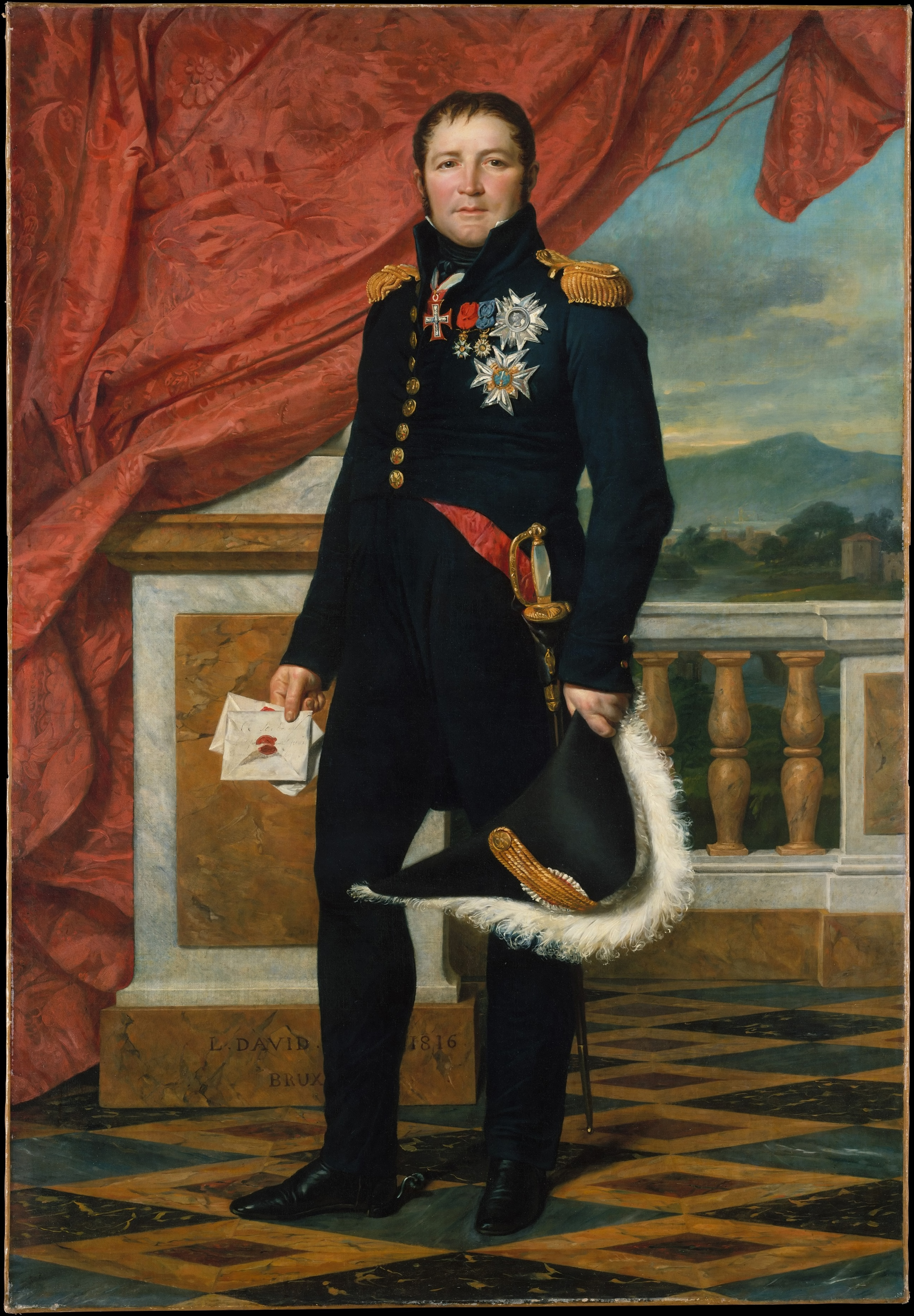
- Portrait of Étienne Maurice Gérard by Jacques-Louis David, 1816 (Note: The portrait is done in 1816, by Jacques-Louis David. Now on display in Metropolitan Museum of Art, New York)

Prime Minister of France
- In office 18 July 1834 – 10 November 1834
- Monarch: Louis Philippe I
- Preceded by: Jean-de-Dieu Soult
- Succeeded by: Hugues-Bernard Maret

Personal details
- Born: 4 April 1773 Damvillers, Kingdom of France
- Died: 17 April 1852 (aged 79) Paris, French Republic
- Awards: Legion of Honor (Grand Cross)

Military service
- Allegiance: First French Republic; First French Empire; Kingdom of France
- Rank: Marshal of France
- Battles/wars: French Revolutionary Wars; War of the First Coalition; Flanders Campaign; Battle of Valmy; Battle of Neerwinden (1793); Battle of Jemappes; Battle of Fleurus; Battle of Aldenhoven (1794); Suvorov's Swiss campaign; Campaign in Italy (1796–1797); Battle of Valvasone; Napoleonic Wars; War of the Third Coalition; Battle of Austerlitz; War of the Fourth Coalition; Battle of Jena; Battle of Schleiz; Battle of Halle; Battle of Lübeck; Battle of Mohrungen; Battle of Eylau; Battle of Guttstadt-Deppen; War of the Fifth Coalition; Battle of Wagram; Peninsular War; Battle of Fuentes de Oñoro; French Invasion of Russia; Battle of Smolensk; Battle of Valutino; Battle of Borodino; Battle of Maloyaroslavets; Battle of Krasnoi; Battle of Berezina; War of the Sixth Coalition; Battle of Lützen; Battle of Bautzen; Battle of Goldberg; Battle of Leipzig; Campaign in north-east France (1814); Battle of Brienne; Battle of La Rothière; Battle of Mormant; Battle of Montereau; Battle of Saint-Dizier; War of the Seventh Coalition; Battle of Ligny; Battle of Wavre; Belgian Revolution; Siege of Antwerp (1832)

Étienne Maurice Gérard, 1st Comte Gérard (French: [etjɛn mɔʁis ʒeʁaʁ]; 4 April 1773 – 17 April 1852) was a French general and statesman. He served under a succession of French governments including the ancien regime monarchy, the Revolutionary governments, the Restorations, the July Monarchy, the First and Second Republics, and the First Empire (and arguably the Second), becoming prime minister briefly in 1834. Gérard established a reputation as a natural soldier with a talent for organization matched with great courage. He was listed by Napoleon as one of his best commanders.

== Biography ==
=== Early life and career ===
Born as the son of a royal bailiff at Damvillers, in Lorraine, Gérard received a solid education and attended college in Metz but joined a battalion of volunteers in 1791 at the age of eighteen, and served in the campaigns of 1792–1793 under Generals Charles François Dumouriez and Jean-Baptiste Jourdan. He first saw real action fighting at the defiles of Argonne and then at Jemappes where his conspicuous bravery earned him promotion to second lieutenant and he was promoted again following his actions at Neerwinden. In the summer of 1794, Gérard joined the 71st demi-brigade and fought at the Battle of Fleurus and then at the capture of Charleroi and Aldenhoven where he rushed through enemy lines to establish a rope across the river to allow the troops to cross the Roer. In 1795, he served Jean-Baptiste Bernadotte as aide-de-camp and the two formed a close friendship. Gérard accompanied Bernadotte on his diplomatic mission to Vienna and displayed courage in repelling a riot against the French embassy. Gérard also followed Bernadotte to Italy where he served under Napoleon's command for the first time and was promoted to captain for his actions at Valvasone. In 1799 he fought in Switzerland under the command of André Masséna where he was promoted to chef d'escadron, and in 1800 to the rank of colonel.

=== Rise to prominence ===
As the Grande Armée marched to war in 1805, Gérard served as first aide-de-camp to Bernadotte and greatly distinguished himself at the battle of Austerlitz where he charged at the head of the French squadrons against the Russian Imperial Guard and was wounded by grapeshot to the thigh. During the war against Prussia in 1806, Gérard was at the Battle of Jena where he led a regiment of Hussars in an attack that overthrew the opposing Prussian cavalry and took many prisoners. He then joined in the pursuit to Erfurt, before returning to Bernadotte and fighting at Schleiz, Halle, and Lübeck. For his performance in this campaign, Gérard was made Brigadier General in November 1806. Gérard was next given command of a brigade in VII Corps which was engaged at Mohrungen and Eylau in early 1807. A month after Eylau, he was transferred to command of 2nd brigade in I Corps which took part in the campaign that June and saw action at Guttstadt-Deppen. When the War of the Fifth Coalition broke out, Gérard was made chief of staff in Bernadotte's IX Corps and took command of the Saxon cavalry at the battle of Wagram. He was so praised for his gallant conduct in the fighting that he was created a baron of the First French Empire.

In the Spanish campaign of 1810 and 1811, Gérard gained special distinction at the Battle of Fuentes de Oñoro; and in the expedition to Russia he fought at the battle of Smolensk and the battle of Valutino, and displayed such bravery and ability in the battle of Borodino that he was made général de division. He won further distinction in the disastrous retreat from Moscow, fighting at Maloyaroslavets, Krasnoi and with the rearguard at Berezina and Kowno.

=== Campaigns of 1813–1814 ===
In the campaign of 1813, in command of a division, he took part in the battle of Lützen and at the battle of Bautzen where he was placed in front of the Spree, so as to link up with corps of the extreme right. After ferocious combat, this corps was forced to retreat. Macdonald, judging that this development compromised his vanguard commanded by Gérard, sent him the order to retreat "on the contrary" replied Gérard to the bearer of the order, "instead of withdrawing, we must advance and I will answer for the success of the day". He then gave orders to attack and the positions were retaken. Gérard continued to serve with Macdonald during his independent operations, at Goldberg he repeated what he had done at Bautzen, ignoring orders to retreat and launching an assault that put the enemy to rout. He then fought at the battle of Leipzig (in which he commanded the XI Corps) where he was gravely wounded. After the battle of Bautzen, he was created by Napoleon a count of the Empire. In the Campaign in north-east France (1814), he proved to be one of Napoleon's most capable and energetic subordinates. Gérard prepared Phalsbourg for defense then took command of a division in II Corps which fought at Brienne and then La Rothière where Gérard demonstrated superb defensive skill by repelling a series of attacks from numerically superior coalition forces on the French right flank. He won still greater degrees of distinction at Mormant, Nangis, Valjouan and Montereau, in which he took over command of II Corps from Marshal Victor. During the final phase of the campaign, Gérard continued to distinguish himself, winning at the bridge of Guillotière, putting himself in the thick of the action at a skirmish around Vendeuvre and fighting with his corps at Saint-Dizier.

=== Restoration, Hundred Days and July Revolution ===
After the first Bourbon Restoration, he was named by King Louis XVIII Grand Cross of the Legion of Honor and chevalier of St Louis.

During the Hundred Days, as preparations for the Waterloo campaign were underway Gérard vouched for the loyalty of General Bourmont. Bourmont had previously been an ardent royalist and was suspected of being a spy, handing over Napoleon's orders to General Blücher. Napoleon made Gérard a Peer of France and placed him in command of the IV Corps of the Army of the North. In this capacity Gérard took a brilliant part in the battle of Ligny, and on the morning of 18 June he was foremost in advising Marshal Grouchy to march to the sound of the guns to aid the emperor at Waterloo. Having failed in this he took part in the Battle of Wavre.

Gérard retired to Brussels after the fall of Napoleon, and did not return to France until 1817. He sat as a liberal member of the Restoration's Chamber of Deputies in 1822–1824, and was re-elected in 1827.

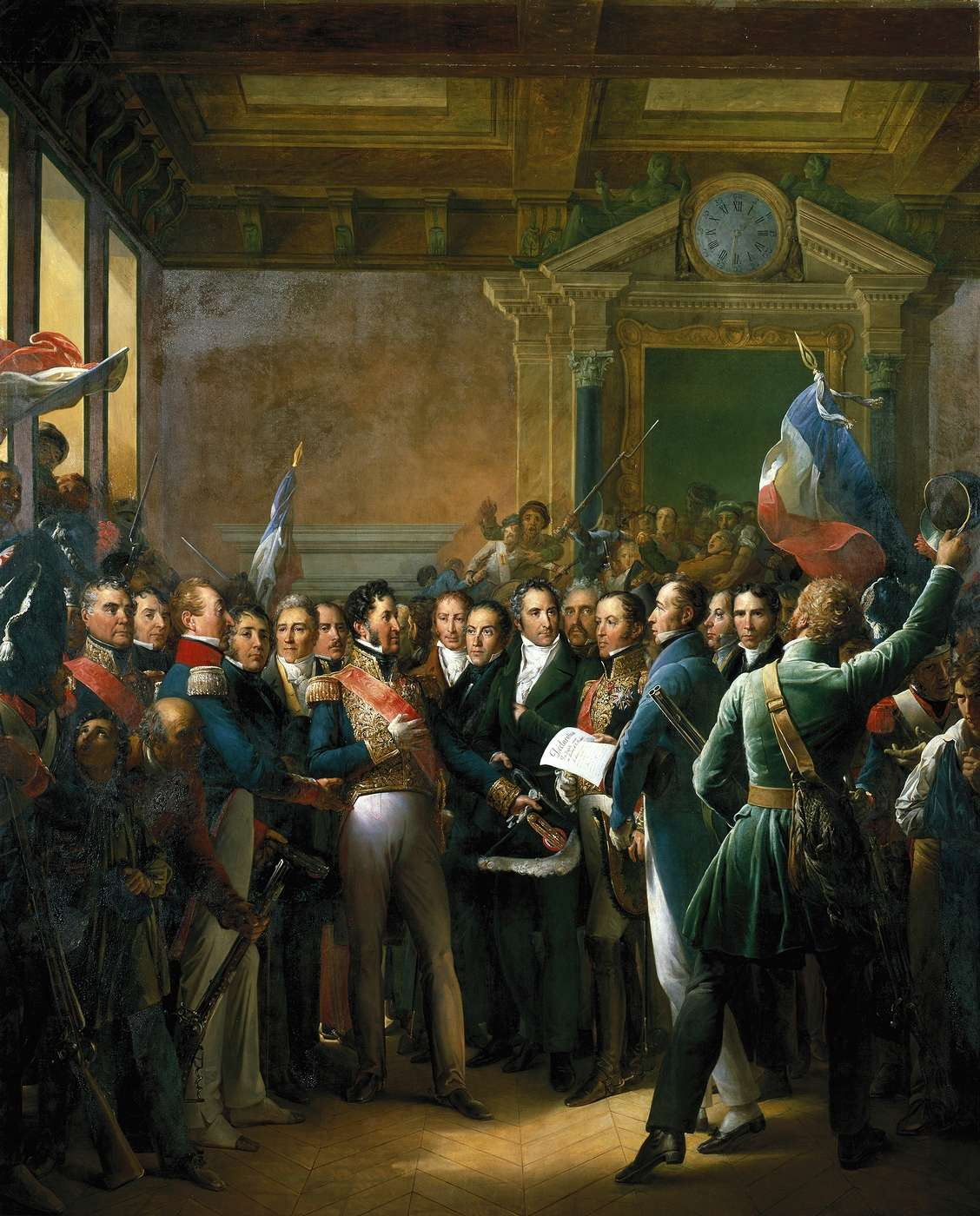
The Reading of the Declaration of the Deputies by François Gérard, 1836. A scene from the July Revolution, Gérard is amongst those gathered round Louis Philippe.

Serving as a voice of moderation in the midst of political chaos, Gérard played an active role during the July Revolution of 1830, after which he was appointed Minister of War and named a Marshal of France. On account of his health he resigned the office of War Minister in the following October.

=== Belgian campaign and later distinctions ===
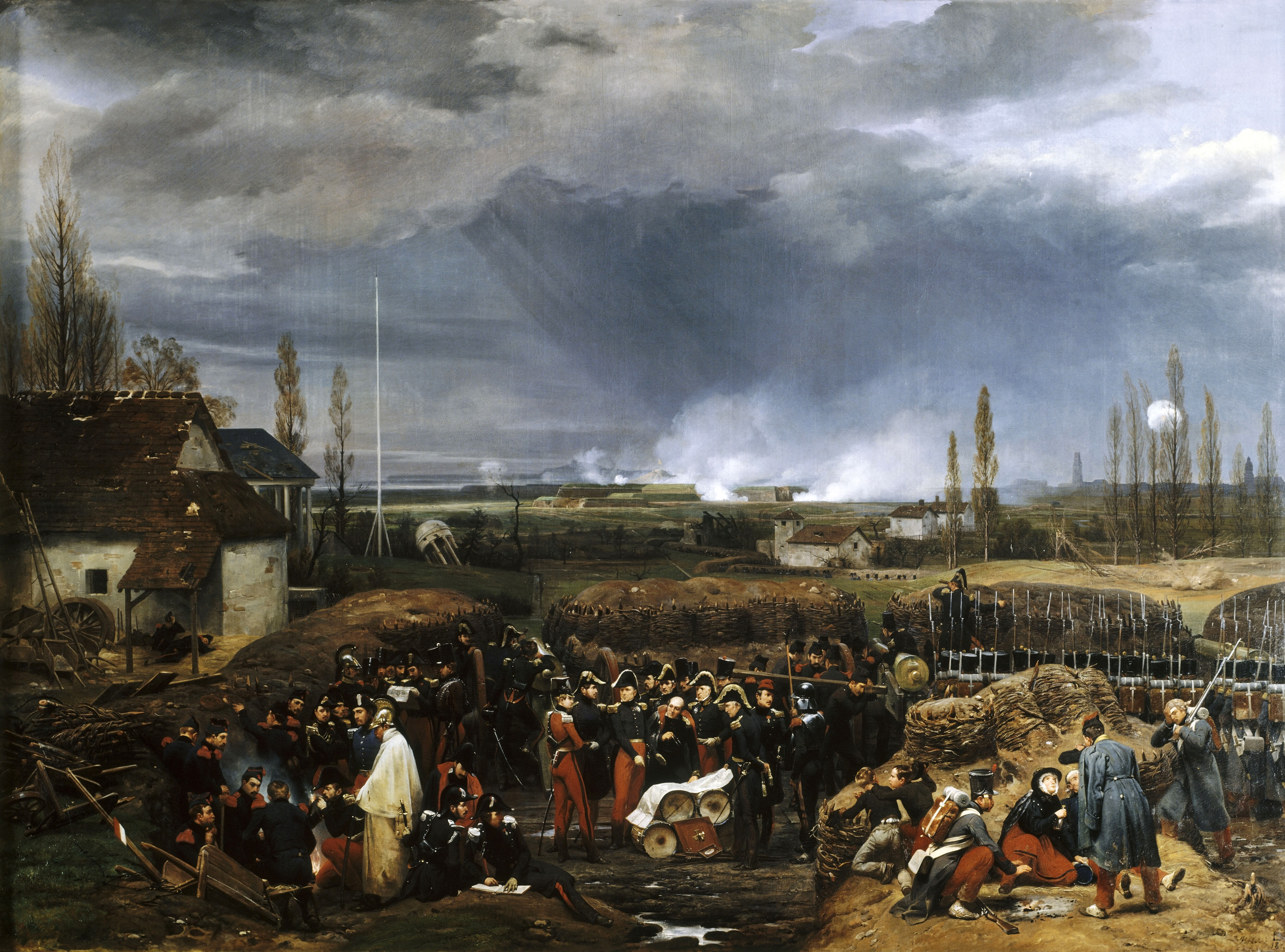
The Siege of Antwerp by Horace Vernet

However, in 1831 he took the command of the Northern Army, and was successful in forcing the army of the Netherlands to withdraw from Belgium (see Belgian Revolution). In 1832 he commanded the besieging army in the famous siege of the citadel of Antwerp. Gérard was awarded a special ceremonial sword by the grateful Belgians in recognition of his triumph.

He was again chosen war minister in July 1834, and served as Prime Minister of the July Monarchy, but resigned in the following October. In 1836 he was named grand chancellor of the Legion of Honour in succession to Marshal Mortier, and in 1838 commander of the National Guards of the Seine département, an office which he held until 1842. He became a senator of the Second Empire in 1852 (before it was formally instituted), and died in the same year, aged 79.

== Marriage and descendants ==
Gérard married Rosemonde de Valence in 1816 and the couple had three children. Their granddaughter was Rosemonde Gérard.

== Notes ==
Political offices
Preceded by Duc de Dalmatie	Prime Minister of France; 1834	Succeeded by Duc de Bassano
Preceded by Louis-Auguste-Victor, Count de Ghaisnes de Bourmont	French minister of War; 31 July 1830 – 17 November 1830	Succeeded by Jean-de-Dieu Soult
Preceded by Jean-de-Dieu Soult	French minister of War; 18 July 1834 – 10 November 1834	Succeeded by Simon Bernard
