= The Reading of the Declaration of the Deputies =

Painting by François Gérard

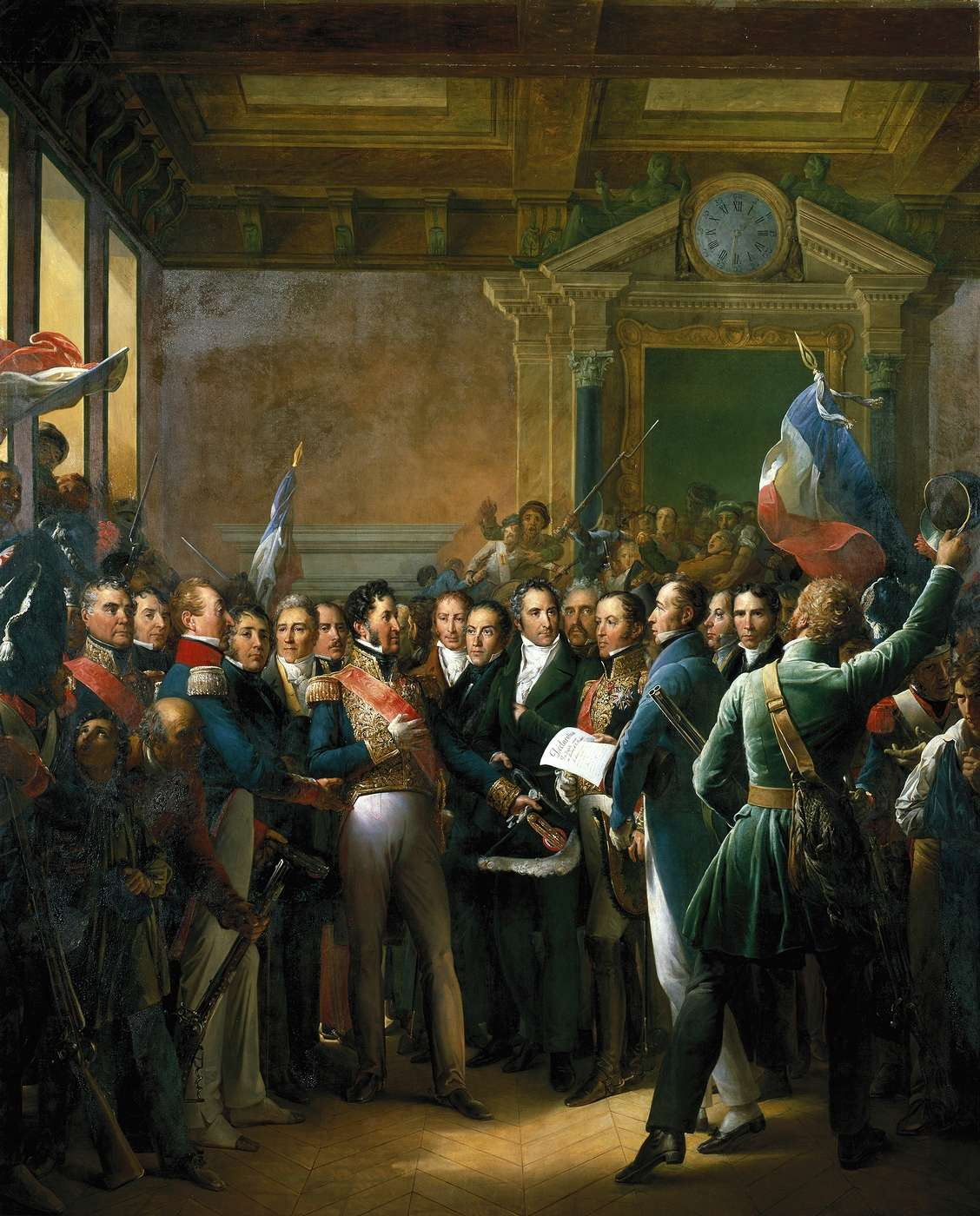
- Artist: François Gérard
- Year: 1836
- Type: Oil on canvas, history painting
- Dimensions: 550 cm × 442 cm (220 in × 174 in)
- Location: Palace of Versailles; Versailles

The Reading of the Declaration of the Deputies (French: Lecture à l'Hôtel de Ville de Paris de la Déclaration des Députés et de la Proclamation du Duc d'Orléans) is an 1836 history painting by the French artist François Gérard. It depicts a scene from the July Revolution of 1830, which led to the overthrow of Charles X of France and his replacement by his cousin the Duke of Orléans who became Louis Philippe I. The painting portrays the moment on 30 July 1830 that a gathering at the City Hall in Paris crowd round to listen to the declaration of the Chamber of Deputies proclaiming that Louise Phillipe be made Lieutenant General of the Kingdom, a step towards his gaining the throne several days later. In addition to Orléans, the painting features Benjamin Constant, Casimir Pierre Périer, Pierre-Agathe Heymès, Marshal Gérard and Jean-Pons-Guillaume Viennet.

François Gérard was a leading French painter, noted particularly for his portraits, who had navigated several changes of regime without losing official favour. The July Monarchy lasted until 1848 when Louis Philippe was himself overthrown in a revolution. The painting was commissioned by Louise Philippe, based on an earlier sketch, now in the Musée Carnavalet, for the new Musée de l'Histoire de France at the Palace of Versailles.

== Bibliography ==
- Boime, Albert. Art in an Age of Counterrevolution, 1815-1848. ISBN 0226063372. University of Chicago Press, 2004.
- Bury, J.P.T. France, 1814-1940. Routledge, 2003.
- Price, Munro. The Perilous Crown: France Between Revolutions, 1814-1848. ISBN 1405040823. Pan Macmillan, 2010.
