= 1st (1st East Prussian) Grenadiers "Crown Prince" =

First (East Prussian) Grenadier Regiment "Crown Prince"
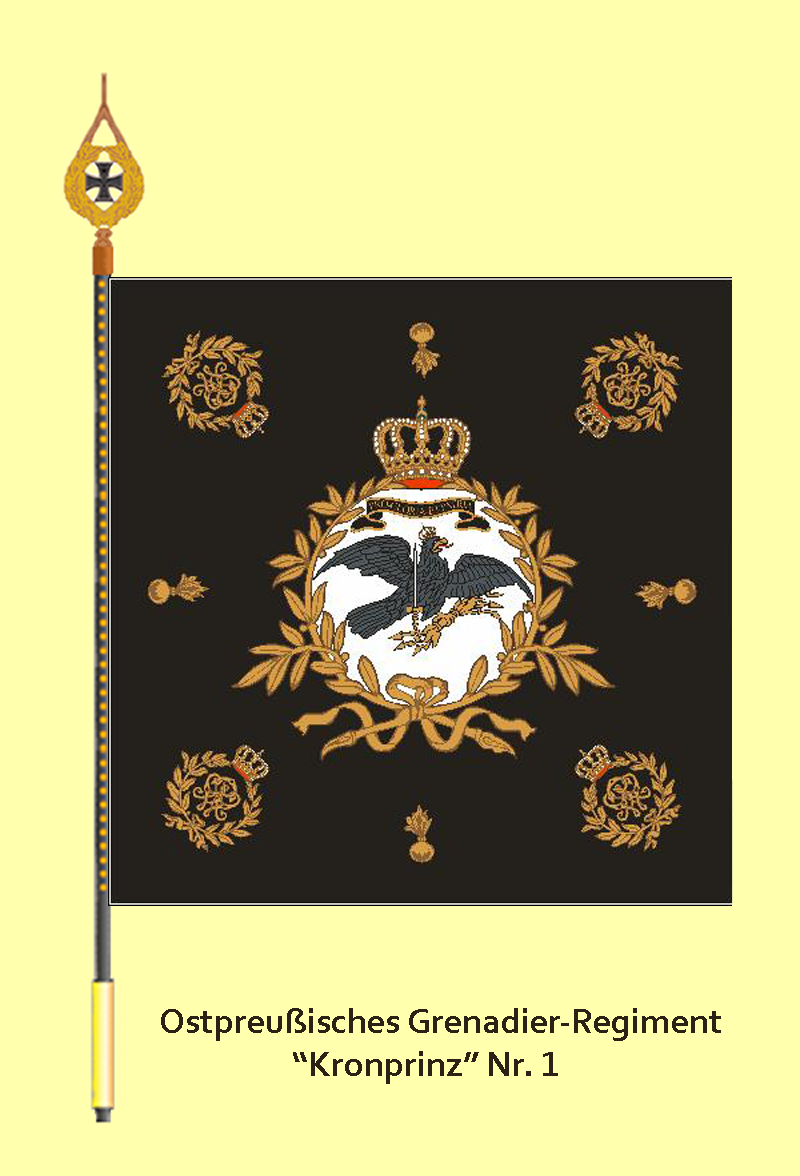
- Active: December 1655 – 1919
- Country: Prussia; German Empire
- Branch: Prussian Army
- Type: Grenadiers
- Size: Regiment
- Garrison/HQ: Königsberg
- Engagements: Second Northern War; First Silesian War; Second Silesian War; Seven Years' War; Napoleonic Wars; Austro-Prussian War; Franco-Prussian War; World War I

The First (East Prussian) Grenadier Regiment "Crown Prince" (German: Grenadier-Regiment Kronprinz (1. Ostpreußisches) Nr. 1) was an infantry regiment of Brandenburg-Prussia, and later the Kingdom of Prussia and German Empire. It was also known as the Old Prussian Infantry Regiment No.2 (German: Altpreußische Infanterieregiment No. 2) as well as the 1st East Prussian Infantry Regiment (German: 1. Infanterie-Regiment (1. Ostpreußisches)).

== 17th century ==
The regiment was established on December 20th 1655 in Pomerania and Neumark by Bogislaw von Schwerin at the order of Elector Friedrich Wilhelm and later took part in the 1656 Battle of Warsaw. The regiment then was quartered in East Prussia (Rastenburg and Gerdauen) in 1657. The regiment then fought against the Swedes in the 1674-1679 Nordic War. As a part of the Reichsarmee of the Holy Roman Emperor the regiment fought at the 1697 Battle of Zenta during the Great Turkish War.

== 18th century ==
The regiment took part in the War of Spanish Succession, Polish Succession, First and Second Silesian Wars, and the Seven Years’ War, and was present at the battles of Hohenfriedberg(1745), Groß-Jägersdorf(1757), Zorndorf(1759), Kay(1759), Kunersdorf(1759), Torgau(1760), and Reichenbach(1762).

== 19th century ==
By 1806, the Regiment was designated Nr.2 under the command of Ernst von Rüchel.

Following the defeat at the Battle of Jena in 1806, Prussia was forced to reorganize and downsize its army. Six of the remaining infantry regiments were chosen to be reformed, and were each given a light infantry battalion to complete them. The No.2 with its new 3rd battalion became the 1st East Prussian Infantry Regiment. The new army was organized into six peace-time brigades, and the 1st East Prussian Infantry Regiment was put into the East Prussian Brigade.

When Napoleon invaded Russia in 1812 there were 14,000 Prussian infantry attached to the auxiliary corps of the Grand Army. The six regiments were assembled from assorted battalions of multiple Prussian army regiments. The No.1 infantry regiment of the Prussian forces in Russia was made up of the 2nd battalion/1st East Prussian Regiment, the 1st Battalion/2nd East Prussian Regiment, and the Fusilier battalion of the 1st East Prussian regiment. Unlike most of Napoleon's army the Prussian forces returned home mostly unharmed, saved by the Convention of Tauroggen.

In 1813, with the start of the war of the 6th coalition, and Prussia mobilized its army for war. During the first battle of the campaign the 1st East Prussian Regiment had just returned from combat in Russia, and had two of its battalions (2nd battalion and fusilier battalion) in the "1st Combined Infantry Regiment". At Lützen they were on the left flank under Generalmajor von Hünerbein, but were driven back with the rest of the army.

After Lützen the 1st East Prussian Infantry battalions were reunited in Generallieutenant von Yorck's Korps. They were within Yorck's right wing as part of Oberst von Zielinsky's Infantry brigade. The regiment was in the center of the Prussian line, and was mauled by the from the artillery barrage of the Grand Battery. In the successive French assault, the regiment was in the thick of the fighting for the entire day, but was beaten back from the village of Bautzen.

During the brief truce that followed the Battle of Bautzen, the First East Prussian Regiment was placed under the command of Duke Carl of Mecklenburg, still within Yorck's Korps. They saw heavy fighting at the Combat of Goldberg where the East Prussian Infantry were briefly surrounded by French cavalry. After being rescued by the Mecklenburg-Strelitz Hussars, Mecklenburg personally led a counterattack of the Regiment's 2nd battalion, and buying time for the rest of his brigade to withdraw and reorganize. Mecklenburg's brigade again distinguished itself at the Battle of Katzbach, in which it held off strong assaults by the French Army.

The Regiment again saw heavy combat at the Battle of Wartenburg, as Mecklenburg's brigade conducted a flanking maneuver around General Bertrand's flank. The brigade was able to succeed in this maneuver, after forcing a group of Württemburgers out of Bleddin by 2pm. By turning Bertrand's flank, the French were forced to withdraw and the stage was set for the Battle of Leipzig.

During the Battle of Leipzig, the regiment was positioned on the allied right flank, and was ordered forward on the first day of fighting to take the city of Möckern. The village was heavily fortified, and had a manor, palace, walled gardens, and low walls. Each position was turned into a fortress with the walls being loop-holed for covered fire by the French. The ground to the west of the position was too wooded and swampy for artillery. The bloody street fighting took a heavy toll on both sides, and the battle hung in the balance until Prussian cavalry charged and secured the field. For the next three days of the battle, the regiment stayed on the right flank and pushed to try to encircle Napoleon's forces, even helping to secure the village of Leipzig itself.

As a result of the actions the 1. East Prussian Infantry, and indeed the actions of the entire brigade, Duke Carl was awarded the Iron Cross. In addition to this, as Regiment-Chef of the 1. East Prussian Infantry, he was granted the now rare honor of having his name affixed to the Regiment's official designation. On 21 October, 1813, the Regiment was officially designated 1. Ostpreußisches Infanterie-Regiment Prinz Carl von Mecklenburg-Strelitz. The unit continued to see action through 1814 and the conclusion of the War of the Sixth Coalition.

Throughout the war, the regiment's grenadier companies had largely fought as part of a separate Grenadier Battalion within Yorck's vanguard alongside the Grenadier companies of the 3. East Prussian Infantry Regiment. At the conclusion of the war, these grenadier companies were fully detached and formed into a new regiment, The 1st (Emperor Alexander) Guards Grenadiers.

In 1849, the Regiment was briefly stationed in Danzig, but in 1855 it returned to Königsberg to the newly built Kronprinz Defence Barracks. In 1860, a new commander was appointed to the regiment: the future Frederick III. Under his command, the regiment saw significant action in both the Austro-Prussian War as well as the Franco-Prussian War. It was during this time that the regiment began using the moniker "Kronprinz" as Frederick was the Crown Prince of Prussia.

Upon the death of Frederick in 1888, the regiment's name was again changed, this time to Grenadier Regiment King Frederick III (1st East Prussian) No. 1. This change did not last, however, as the regiment once again became the home to Prussia's Crown Prince in 1900. Kaiser Wilhelm II reverted the Regiment's moniker to Kronprinz on 6 May, 1900 stating

"I wish to once again bestow upon the Grenadier Regiment King Friedrich III (1st East Prussian) No. 1 the name "Grenadier Regiment Crown Prince (1st East Prussian) No. 1," which it carried with distinction in the wars of 1866 and 1870/71. This is being done today, on the occasion of appointing my son, His Imperial and Royal Highness the Crown Prince, as an honorary member (à la suite) of the regiment.

At the same time, I decree that the regiment shall wear the Guard Eagle without a star on their helmets and adorn their collars and sleeve patches as follows: a. Officers shall wear the embroidery that was previously worn when it was known as the Regiment von Kanitz. b. Enlisted men shall wear white braids. I have the utmost confidence that the regiment will draw renewed inspiration from this special mark of my royal favor, and will continue to serve me, my house, and the Fatherland with the same loyalty and dedication it has demonstrated throughout its nearly 250-year history."

– Berlin, May 6, 1900.

== 20th century ==
The regiment was part of the 1st Division in World War One fighting on the Eastern Front at The Battle of Tannenberg. And was finally demobilized in 1918. Even so, the traditions of the regiment were inheirited by several units of the new Reichswehr.

== See also ==
- List of Imperial German infantry regiments
