= Hans-Eberhardt Gandert =

German professional soldier (1892–1947)

- Born: 2 September 1892; Sandberg near Belzig, Province of Brandenburg, Kingdom of Prussia, German Empire
- Died: 24 July 1947 (aged 54); Augsburg, Bavaria, Allied-occupied Germany
- Military career
- Allegiance: German Empire; Weimar Republic; Nazi Germany
- Branch: Prussian Army; Imperial German Army; Reichswehr; Luftwaffe
- Service years: 1912–45
- Rank: Generalmajor
- Commands: Jasta 51; Jagdgruppe 6
- Awards: Iron Cross, 2nd and 1st Class; House Order of Hohenzollern, Knight's Cross; Wound Badge in Black; Honour Cross of the World War 1914/1918; Grand Imperial Order of the Red Arrows, Commander; War Merit Cross, 2nd and 1st Class

General-major Hans-Eberhardt Gandert (2 September 1892 – 24 July 1947) was a German professional soldier who began his 33-year military career in 1912. He learned to fly in the early days of World War I, went on to become a flying ace credited with eight aerial victories, including killing British ace Edwin Benbow, and ended the war in command of a fighter group. In the wake of Germany's defeat, he would serve in the German Army until 1934. He would then transfer into the newly established Luftwaffe and serve in increasingly responsible posts until mid-World War II. He retired on 28 February 1945.

== Early life ==
Hans-Eberhardt Gandert was born in Sandberg on 2 September 1892. On 22 March 1912, he entered military service by joining Jäger Battalion Nr. 8 as a Fähnrich. He was commissioned as a leutnant on 16 June 1913. He then attended aviation training at Niederneuendorf from 2 June to 18 August 1914.

== World War I ==
=== Activities ===
Gandert then began service as a pilot in two-seater units of the Luftstreitkräfte. During these postings, he served on the Russian Front; he was shot down on 10 October 1914, but evaded capture and returned to German lines on 13 October.

Gandert continued to serve in two-seaters, being often transferred. He was promoted to oberleutnant on 18 August 1916. Gandert finally scored his first two victories while serving in Romania in November 1917. At some point during his service on the Eastern Front, probably while he was in Romania, Germany's ally, Austria-Hungary, awarded him its Military Merit Cross.

On 9 January 1918, he moved out of two-seaters into a fighter unit, Jasta 51, which was stationed on the Western Front in France. He was assigned to command the squadron until being promoted to command a fighter group. He would lead from the front, scoring five confirmed victories and one unconfirmed, including killing British ace Edwin Benbow. In August 1918, he was awarded the Royal House Order of Hohenzollern; he had previously been awarded both classes of the 1914 Iron Cross.

On 29 September 1918, Gandert was shot down and wounded while attacking British observation balloons, either by ground fire or by No. 210 Squadron RAF. He was detained as a prisoner of war.

=== Unit assignments ===
14 September 1914: Posted to Feldflieger Abteilung 31

27 December 1914: Transferred to Army Flight Park South

6 June 1916: Transferred to Flieger-Abteilung 54

3 November 1916: Awaiting reassignment while in replacement pool

13 July 1917: Transferred back to Army Flight Park South

4 August 1917: Posted to Flieger-Abteilung 242

2 November 1917: Posted to Flieger-Abteilung 24

23 December 1917: Awaiting reassignment while in replacement pool

9 January 1918: Appointed Staffelführer of Jagdstaffel 51

28 February 1918: Appointed to command of Jagdgruppe 6

29 September 1918 – 9 April 1919: Detained as a prisoner of war

=== List of aerial victories ===
See also Aerial victory standards of World War I

Confirmed victories are numbered and listed chronologically. Unconfirmed victories are denoted by "u/c" and may or may not be listed by date.

No.	Date/time	Aircraft	Foe	Result	Location	Notes
1	3 November 1917		Observation balloon	Destroyed	Juridika, Kingdom of Romania	
2	11 November 1917		Farman	Destroyed	Bondarewka, Kingdom of Romania	
u/c	17 March 1918		Enemy aircraft			
3	30 May 1918 @ 2035 hours		Royal Aircraft Factory SE.5a	Destroyed	Nieppewald	Victim was Edwin Benbow, killed in action
4	2 June 1918 @ 1630 hours	Probably a Fokker D.VII	Royal Aircraft Factory SE.5a	Destroyed	Southwest of Bailleul, France	Victim was from No. 1 Squadron RAF
5	21 June 1918 @ 1815 hours	Probably a Fokker D.VII	Sopwith Camel serial number B6326	Destroyed	Gapaard	Victim was from No. 54 Squadron RAF
6	24 July 1918 @ 2100 hours	Fokker D.VII	Bristol F.2 Fighter	Destroyed	Armentières, France	Victims were from No. 20 Squadron RAF; Sgt (Observer / Gunner) M. S. Samson held as POW; Sgt Pilot H. D. Aldridge held as POW
7	15 August 1918 @ 1930 hours	Fokker D.VII	Royal Aircraft Factory SE.5a	Destroyed	Becelacre	
8	28 August 1918	Fokker D.VII	Royal Aircraft Factory RE.8	Destroyed		Victim was from No. 13 Squadron RAF

== Between the World Wars ==
=== Activities ===
Gandert returned from captivity with his Wound Badge to find German aviation being dismantled in the wake of Germany's defeat. He remained in the German military, serving in ground units. After a short spell in motor transport, he began infantry service on 1 October 1920. As he filled increasingly consequential positions, he was promoted to Hauptmann on 1 August 1923, and to Major on 1 July 1933.

Shortly after the Luftwaffe was established, Gandert transferred into it, on 1 October 1934. While performing staff duties in the Reich Air Ministry, he underwent refresher training in aviation; it is probable that he earned his Luftwaffe Pilot's Badge at this time. Following schooling, he served again in motor transport. He was promoted to Oberstleutnant on 1 July 1935. Reassignment to command of an air station and its aviation training regiment was next. His promotion to Oberst on 1 August 1937 was followed by elevation to command of flying schools. One of his students was Robert Heuer.

=== Duty assignments ===
11 April 1919: Assigned to the aerodrome at Neuruppin

1 April 1920: Posted to Defense Ministry

6 May 1920: Assigned to serve in motor transport

1 October 1920: Assigned to infantry service, rising to company command and gaining staff experience

1 October 1934: Transferred to Luftwaffe, with duties in the Reich Air Ministry

1 April 1935: Seconded to bomber aviation training, followed by detachment to flying school at Cottbus

15 May 1935: Seconded to motor transport duties

1 February 1936: Appointed to command both the 12th Flying Training Regiment and Airbase Quedlinburg, rising to command of flying schools

1 July 1938: Appointed as a department chief in the Reich Labor Ministry

== World War II and beyond ==
=== Activities ===
Gandert received his final promotion, to Generalmajor, on 1 December 1939. Starting on 19 July 1941, his prior experience in logistics was utilized supplying food and clothing to the entire Luftwaffe. His next posting was also Luftwaffe-wide. After a transfer to the reserves, he retired on 28 February 1945. After 33 years of service, he also earned his Wehrmacht Long Service Award.

Hans-Eberhard Gandert died in Augsburg, Germany on 24 July 1947.

=== Duty assignments ===
19 July 1941: Appointed as Inspector of Clothing and Food Supplies for the Luftwaffe

1 May 1942: Placed in charge of the Luftwaffe Exercise Grounds at Zingst

26 November 1944 – 28 February 1945: Reserve duty
