= Friedrich Karl Florian =

German Nazi official (1894–1975)

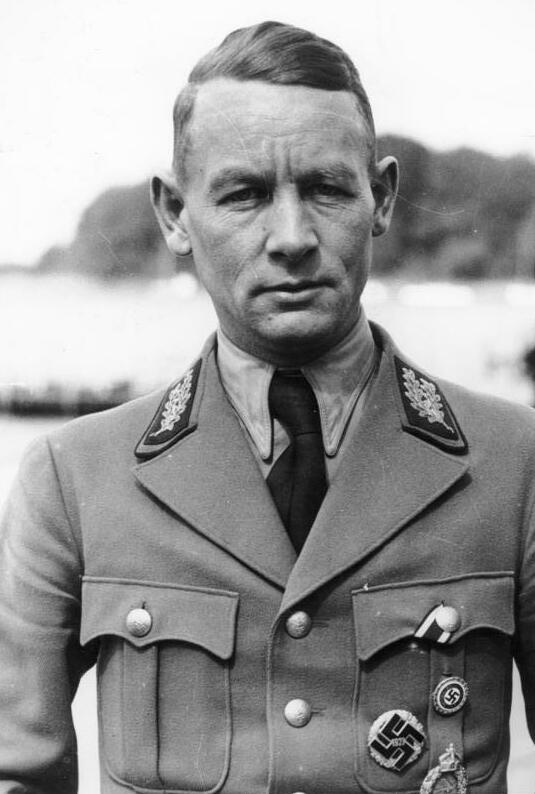
- Florian in 1934

Gauleiter of Gau Düsseldorf
- In office 1 August 1930 – 17 April 1945
- Appointed by: Adolf Hitler
- Preceded by: Office created
- Succeeded by: Office abolished

Personal details
- Born: 4 February 1894 Essen, Rhine Province, Kingdom of Prussia, German Empire
- Died: 24 October 1975 (aged 81) Mettmann, West Germany
- Party: Nazi Party
- Other political affiliations: Völkisch-Social Bloc; National Socialist Freedom Movement
- Occupation: Mining official

Military service
- Allegiance: German Empire
- Branch/service: Luftstreitkräfte
- Years of service: 1914–1919
- Rank: Unteroffizier
- Unit: 1st (1st East Prussian) Grenadiers "Crown Prince"; Jagdstaffel 51
- Battles/wars: World War I (POW)
- Awards: Iron Cross, 2nd Class

Friedrich Karl Florian (4 February 1894 – 24 October 1975) was the Gauleiter of Gau Düsseldorf throughout its existence in Nazi Germany.

== Early life ==
The son of a Prussian railway master, Florian moved in his youth to East Prussia. After graduating from the gymnasium in Stallupönen he became a mining official in Buer in the Prussian Province of Westphalia. In August 1914, he volunteered for military service in World War I as a Kriegsfreiwilliger and was assigned to the 1st (1st East Prussian) Grenadiers "Crown Prince" Regiment (Garrison: Königsberg). He served in this unit until 1916, when he volunteered for the Fliegertruppe and was assigned after training to Jagdstaffel 51 in Jagdgeschwader Richthofen. Shot down and captured by British troops in May 1918, he spent the remainder of the war as a prisoner of war and was released from captivity in November 1919.

In the postwar years, he resumed his work as a mining official until 1929. From 1920 to 1922, he was a member of Deutschvölkischer Schutz- und Trutzbund, the largest, most active, and most influential antisemitic federation in Germany. Active in the resistance to the French occupation of the Ruhr, he was briefly banished from the area in 1923. He was co-founder of the Westphalia Loyalty Federation and returned to Buer in 1924. Politically, he was a leader in the Ruhr area of the Völkisch-Social Bloc and the National Socialist Freedom Movement, both right-wing nationalist parties.

== Nazi career ==
Florian joined the Nazi Party on 18 August 1925 (membership number 16,699). He founded the local Party organization in Buer and was its Ortsgruppenleiter (local group leader) from 1925 to 1927. He also joined the Sturmabteilung (SA) in August 1925 as a Sturmführer. He advanced to Kreisleiter (county leader) from 1927 to 1929. He concurrently served until 1929 as the only Nazi city councilor in Gelsenkirchen.

On 1 October 1929, Florian was named the Bezirksleiter (district leader) for Bergisches Land-Niederrhein, succeeding Fritz Hartl. When this area was upgraded to Gau status on 1 August 1930, Florian was named the first (and only) Gauleiter of Gau Düsseldorf. In September 1930, he was elected as a member of the Reichstag from electoral district 22, Düsseldorf East, a seat he would retain until the fall of the Nazi regime in May 1945. In these years Florian also founded the publishing company Volkischer Verlag and the Nazi newspapers Wuppertaler Zeitung and Bergischer Beobachter.

In April 1932, he became a member of the Landtag of Prussia and in September 1933 of the Prussian State Council. On 25 September 1933, he was promoted to SA-Gruppenführer. Also in 1933, he was made chairman of the Rhenish Local Parliament and appointed to the Rhenish Provincial Landtag. In 1934, he was made a member of the Prussian Provincial Council for the Rhine Province, and in 1935 was elected to the Academy for German Law. In May 1936, he was appointed to the Reichsleitung, the Nazi Party national leadership. On 30 January 1937 he attained the rank of SA-Obergruppenführer.

On 10 November 1938, Florian played an active part in the Kristallnacht pogrom in Düsseldorf, leading SA and Hitler Youth in attacking the home of the Regierungspräsident Carl Christian Schmid, whose wife was Jewish. In the city-wide attacks on Jewish homes and businesses, five persons were killed and hundreds were injured or left homeless.

On 16 November 1942, Florian was named Reich Defense Commissioner for his Gau, and in October 1944 he was made head of the Düsseldorf Volkssturm contingent.

On 23 March 1945, Florian and two other Gauleiters from the industrial Ruhr area (Albert Hoffmann and Fritz Schlessmann) met with Reichsminister of Armaments and War Production Albert Speer. Speer tried to convince them to ignore Adolf Hitler’s Nero Decree mandating a scorched earth policy ahead of the Allied armies' advance. A rabid Nazi, Florian alone argued in favor of the policy. He read aloud a proclamation he intended to issue ordering the evacuation of the population of Düsseldorf and setting fire to all buildings, leaving the Allies a burned-out, deserted city. However, in the end, he did not issue the proclamation and was unable to implement these drastic actions before the Allies captured the city.

== Post-war life ==
Captured by US forces on 17 April 1945 and interned at the Esterwegen concentration camp, Florian made two suicide attempts while in custody, by poison and by jumping out a third-floor window. He was charged with ordering the execution of five Düsseldorf citizens who in April 1945 had attempted to surrender the city to the US Army, but was acquitted in March 1949. Shortly afterwards in June 1949, Florian was convicted by the denazification court and was sentenced to six years in prison and a 20,000 Reichsmark fine because of his leadership role in the Nazi Party. Taking into consideration time served, he was released on 1 May 1951. He then found employment as an industrial representative. He remained a convinced Nazi and maintained contact with former associates from the Nazi era. According to information obtained by British intelligence, he was a close collaborator of Werner Naumann in the organization known as the Naumann Circle that attempted to infiltrate political parties in West Germany in the early 1950s.

== Character assessment ==
During his stay in Düsseldorf, the racialist, right-wing journalist Lothrop Stoddard described Florian thus: "He was a distinctly sinister-looking type; hard-faced, with a cruel eye and a still crueler mouth. A sadist, if I ever saw one. I can imagine how unpopular he must be among the good-natured, kindly Duesseldorfers".

== Decorations and awards ==
- 1914 Iron Cross Second Class
- Golden Party Badge, c.1933
- Honour Chevron for the Old Guard, February 1934
- The Honour Cross of the World War 1914/1918 with Swords, 1934
- Anschluss Medal, c.1938
- Sudetenland Medal, c.1939

== Sources ==
- Höffkes, Karl (1986). Hitlers Politische Generale. Die Gauleiter des Dritten Reiches: ein biographisches Nachschlagewerk. Tübingen: Grabert-Verlag. ISBN 3-87847-163-7.
- Klee, Ernst (2007). Das Personenlexikon zum Dritten Reich. Wer war was vor und nach 1945. Frankfurt-am-Main: Fischer-Taschenbuch-Verlag. ISBN 978-3-596-16048-8.
- Miller, Michael; Schulz, Andreas (2012). Gauleiter: The Regional Leaders of the Nazi Party and Their Deputies, 1925-1945, Vol. 1. R. James Bender Publishing. ISBN 978-1-932970-21-0.
- Miller, Michael (2015). Leaders of The Storm Troops Volume 1. England: Helion & Company. ISBN 978-1-909982-87-1.
- Speer, Albert (1970). Inside the Third Reich. New York: Avon Books. ISBN 978-0380000715.
