= Karl Plauth =

- Born: 27 August 1896; Munich, Germany
- Died: 1 November 1927 (aged 31)
- Military career
- Allegiance: Germany
- Branch: Aviation
- Rank: Leutnant
- Units: Flieger-Abteilung 204; Jagdstaffel 20
- Commands: Jagdstaffel 51
- Awards: Iron Cross

Leutnant Karl Plauth was a German World War I flying ace credited with 17 aerial victories. He would crash a Junkers A 32 to his death on a test flight.

== Biography ==
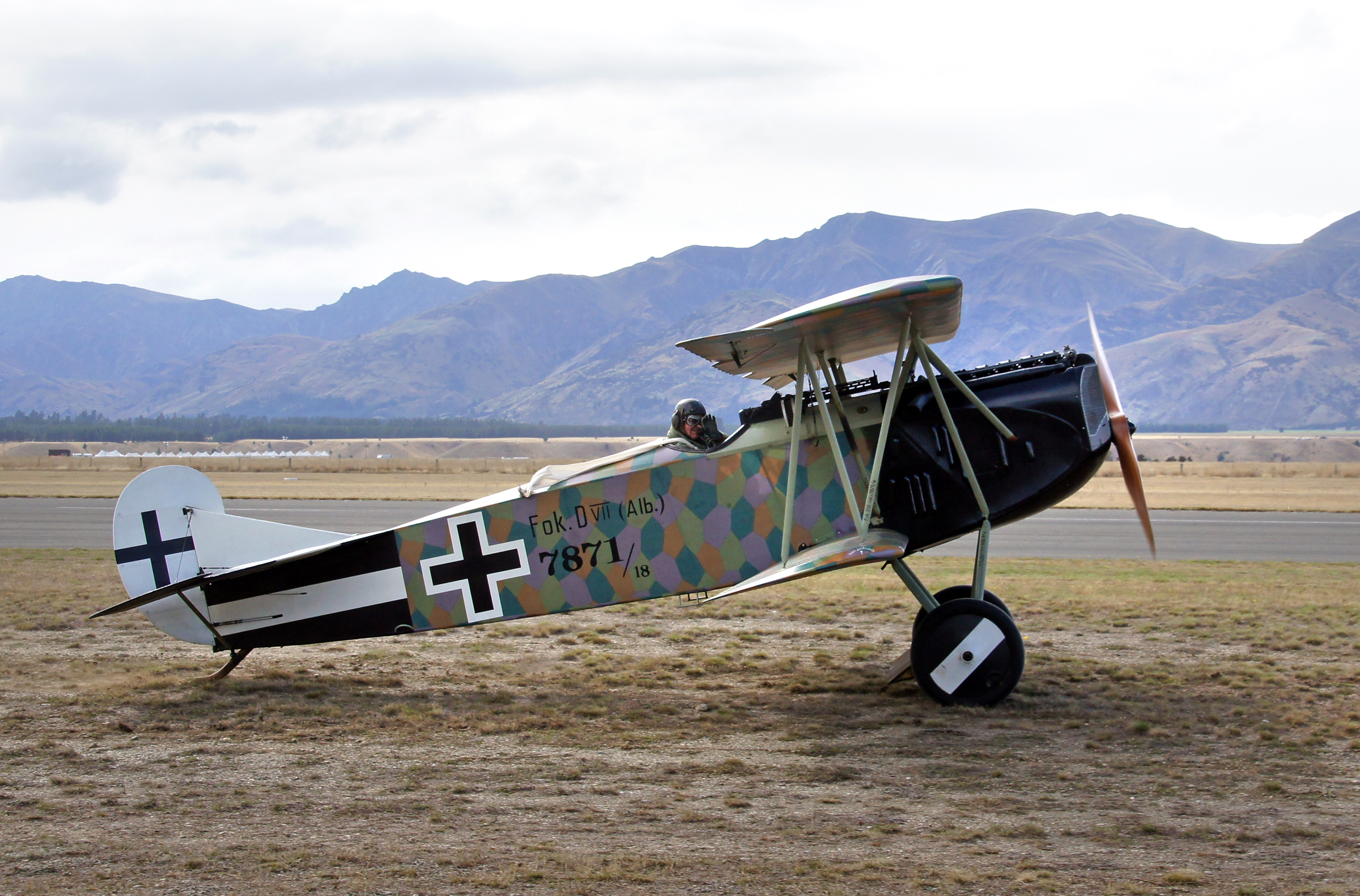
Plauth crashed one Fokker D.VII, flew another to 16 victories.

Karl Plauth was born on 27 August 1896 in Munich, Germany.

Plauth originally served in a pioneer battalion early in the First World War. After being wounded during the Battle of Verdun and earning a First Class Iron Cross, he transferred to the flying service. After a stint in Flieger-Abteilung 204 (Flier Detachment 204), he was assigned to fly a Fokker D.VII with Royal Prussian Jagdstaffel 20 (Fighter Squadron 20) on 14 June 1918. Plauth scored his first triumph on 9 July 1918.

On 14 July, he was shot down, totaling his airplane, lacerating his head and blackening his eye. He was grounded for eight days because of the eye. That did not deter him from scoring again on the 31st. By 28 September, his tally stood at 10. The following day, he became the Staffelführer of Royal Prussian Jagdstaffel 51. As their leader, he shot down seven more enemy aircraft during October, 1918, bringing his total to 17. However, he was no killer; he preferred to see his opponents survive.

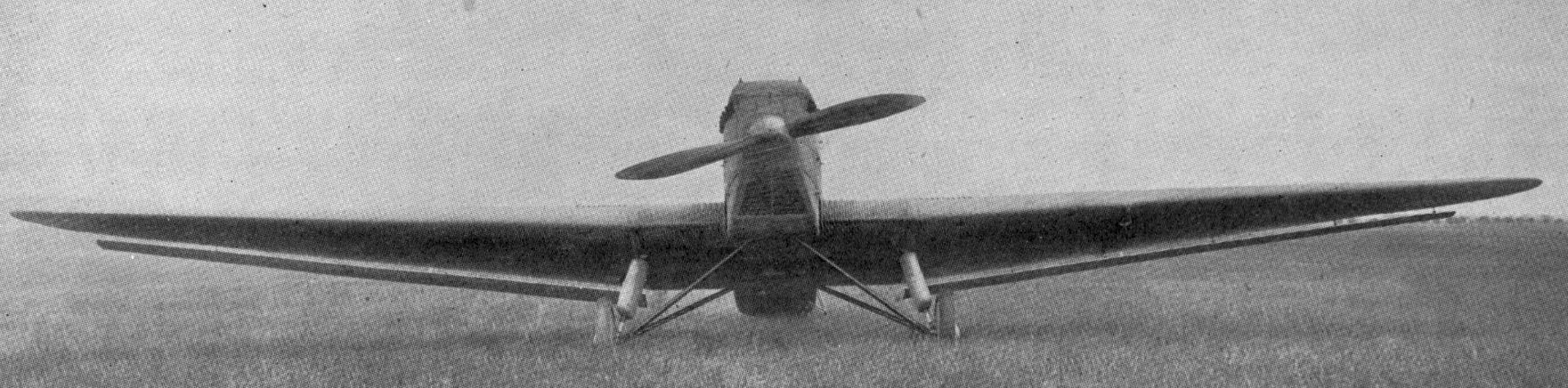
A Junkers A 32, December 1927. Probably not the one Plauth crashed.

He was piloting the Junkers A 32, which he helped design, on a test flight on 2 November 1927, when it failed to pull out of a loop. He died in the resulting crash.
