= Jacques Joseph Viennet =

Jacques Joseph Viennet (14 April 1734 in Béziers – 12 August 1824 in Béziers) was a French politician and a member of the National Convention in 1792.

== Life ==
His family was Italian in origin, dating back to a lieutenant of Desiderius, king of the Lombards. Aged 18, he was bestowed a canonry in the chapter of Capestang, but renounced it two years later for a military career, joining the régiment des dragons du Languedoc as an officer. He was involved in the Hanover campaigns (1757–1759) and participated in the last battles of the Seven Years' War. At the end of that war, in 1763, his regiment was disbanded and he went into retirement until the French Revolution.

A municipal officer of Béziers in 1790, on 9 September 1791 he was elected to the National Assembly as député for Hérault, the 8th of 9, by 233 votes out of 420. He sat with the moderates and was re-elected on 4 September 1792 for the same département, with 409 out of 484 votes. He contested the Assembly's right to judge Louis XVI and declared "I never believed myself authorised by our constituents to be a judge; I always thought that an assembly of legislators could not set up a judicial tribunal, that the same body cannot simultaneously exercise justice and make the laws and that this accumulation of powers will end up in a monstrosity. The precipitate speed with which you have decided to judge Louis gives your enemies ample material for the most bitter and perhaps the most just criticisms" Pressed to reply, he continued "[If I am] asked to declare if Louis is guilty, I reply Yes. If I am asked today what kind of punishment ought to be applied to Louis, I reply - a man can only be punished by laws that pre-dated the crimes that he committed. The only thing to be held against Louis is the prevention of the abdication of the monarchy." He voted for the king to be imprisoned for the duration of the war, an appeal to the people and sentencing.

In an altercation he had with Jean-Paul Marat, who fired a pistol at him from his pocket, Viennet grabbed his arm and demanded he meet him for a duel at the bois de Boulogne - Marat declined the invitation.

Viennet fought the suggestions of Voulland who had claimed he had revolutionised the Hérault, and he was with Cochon de Lapparent commissaire for re-raising the cavalry in the 14 armies of the Republic. In this post he gave evidence of his probity. He was elected to the Council of Ancients as deputy for Herault by 193 out of 232 votes on 13 October 1795, and was a sociétaire of this assembly, sitting in it until March 1798, when he left the political scene.

He was the father of Jean-Pons-Guillaume Viennet and the brother of the priest Louis Esprit Viennet who became priest of Paris's église Saint-Merry aged 40 and in 1790 preached a sermon on the civil constitution of the clergy.
