= Jagdstaffel 51 =

Jasta 51
- Active: 1917–1918
- Country: German Empire
- Branch: Luftstreitkräfte
- Type: Fighter squadron
- Engagements: World War I

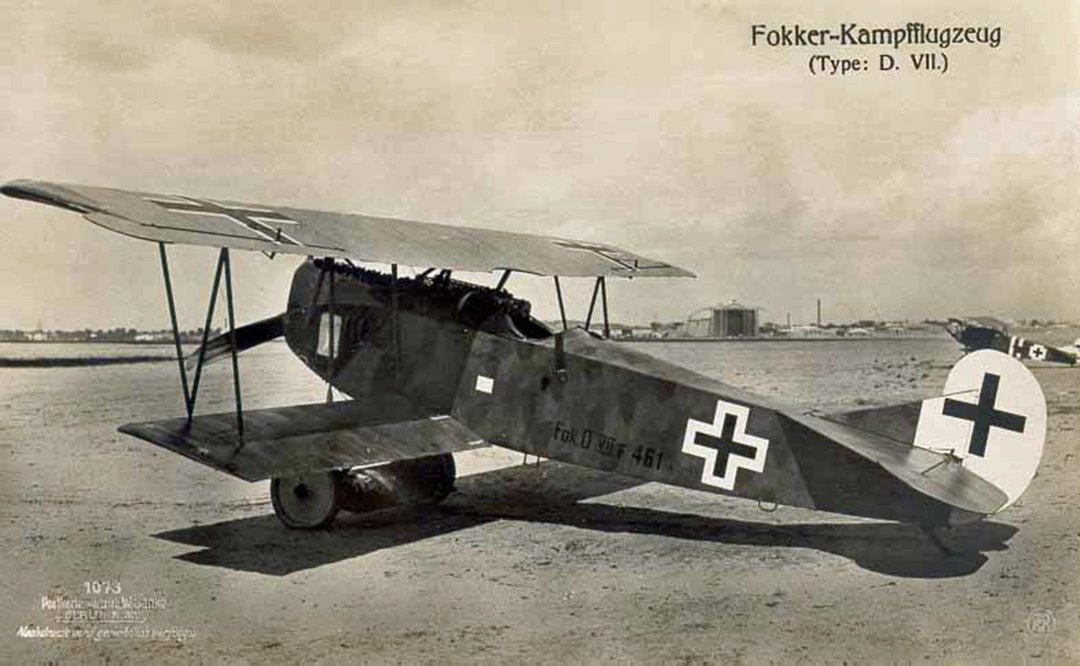
Jagdstaffel 51 (1918)

Royal Prussian Jagdstaffel 51, commonly abbreviated to Jasta 51, was a "hunting group" (i.e., fighter squadron) of the Luftstreitkräfte, the air arm of the Imperial German Army during World War I. The squadron would score over 24 aerial victories during the war. The unit's victories came at the expense of 10 killed in action, two killed in a mid-air collision, two wounded in action, one injured in an aviation accident, and two taken prisoner of war. A member of this unit was Friedrich Karl Florian Nazi Gauleiter of Düsseldorf, Germany.

== History ==
Jasta 51 was founded on 27 December 1917. It went operational on 9 January 1918. Also in January, it joined Jagdgruppe 3. Its first aerial victory came 14 March 1918. The squadron would operate its Fokker D.VIIs through war's end.

== Commanding officers (Staffelführer) ==
- Hans-Eberhardt Gandert: 27 December 1917 – 29 September 1918
- Karl Plauth: 10 October 1918 – ca 11 November 1918

== Duty stations ==
- Wynghene: 10 January 1918
- Jabbeke, Belgium: 1 February 1918
