= Ruhr pocket =

Battle on the Western Front in 1945

- Part of the Western Allied invasion of Germany in the Western Front of the European theatre of World War II
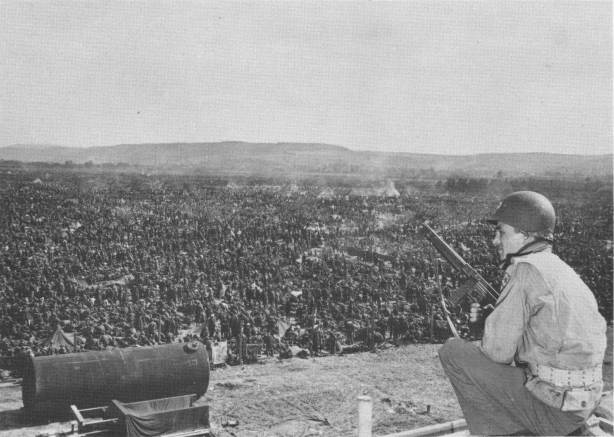
- An American soldier at Rheinwiesenlager guards a massive crowd of German prisoners captured in the Ruhr pocket
Date	1–18 April 1945 (2 weeks and 6 days)
Location	Ruhr area, North Rhine-Westphalia, Germany 51°28′N 7°33′E
Result	Allied victory: Capitulation of the German Army Group B

Belligerents
United States; United Kingdom; German resistance	Germany

Commanders and leaders
(United States) Omar Bradley (United Kingdom) Bernard Montgomery (United States) Courtney H. Hodges (United States) William H. Simpson (United States) Leonard T. Gerow	(Nazi Germany) Albert Kesselring (Nazi Germany) Walter Model ‡‡ (Nazi Germany) Albert Hoffmann (Nazi Germany) Gustav-Adolf von Zangen (surrendered) (Nazi Germany) Josef Harpe (surrendered)

Units involved
(United States) 12th Army Group; (United States) 1st Army; (United States) 15th Army; (United States) 9th Army; (United Kingdom) 21st Army Group	(Nazi Germany) Army Group B; (Nazi Germany) 5th Panzer Army; (Nazi Germany) 15th Army; (Nazi Germany) 1st Parachute Army

Casualties and losses
1,500 killed 8,000 wounded 500 missing Total: 10,000	317,000 soldiers captured About 10,000 people killed (including prisoners of war in German captivity, foreign forced laborers, Volkssturm militia and unarmed civilians); Total: 327,000

The Ruhr pocket was a battle of encirclement that took place in April 1945, on the Western Front near the end of World War II in Europe, in the Ruhr Area of Germany. Some 317,000 German troops were taken prisoner along with 24 generals. The Americans suffered 10,000 casualties including 2,000 killed or missing.

Exploiting the capture of the Ludendorff Bridge at Remagen on 7 March 1945, the U.S. 12th Army Group (General Omar Bradley) advanced rapidly into German territory south of Army Group B (Generalfeldmarschall (field marshal) Walter Model). In the north, the Allied 21st Army Group (Field Marshal Bernard Montgomery) crossed the Rhine in Operation Plunder on 23 March. The lead elements of the two Allied army groups met on 1 April 1945, east of the Ruhr, to create the encirclement of 317,000 German troops to their west.

While the bulk of the U.S. forces advanced east towards the Elbe river, 18 U.S. divisions remained behind to destroy Army Group B. The reduction of the German pocket began on 1 April by the U.S. Ninth Army, with the forces of the U.S. First Army joining on 4 April. For 13 days the Germans delayed or resisted the U.S. advance. On 14 April, the First and Ninth armies met, splitting the German pocket in half, and German resistance began to crumble.

Having lost contact with its units, the German 15th Army capitulated the same day. Model dissolved his army group on 15 April and ordered the Volkssturm and non-combatant personnel to discard their uniforms and go home. On 16 April the bulk of the German forces surrendered en masse to the U.S. divisions. Organized resistance came to an end on 18 April. Unwilling to surrender with his rank of field marshal into Allied captivity, Model committed suicide on the afternoon of 21 April.

== Background ==
After D-Day in June 1944, the Allies began pushing east toward Germany. In March 1945, the Allies crossed the River Rhine. South of the Ruhr, the U.S. 12th Army Group (General Omar Nelson Bradley) pursued the disintegrating German armies and captured the Ludendorff Bridge across the Rhine at Remagen with the 9th Armored Division (U.S. First Army). Bradley and his subordinates quickly exploited the crossing made on 7 March 1945 and expanded the bridgehead until the bridge collapsed 10 days later.

North of the Ruhr on 23 March 1945, the British Empire 21st Army Group (Field Marshal Sir Bernard Montgomery), which incorporated the US Ninth Army, launched Operation Plunder (with the airborne Operation Varsity in support) crossing the Rhine at Rees and Wesel.

The Ruhr was one of the Third Reich’s last major industrial centers, housing the vast Krupp steelworks. Despite the increasingly desperate military situation, the region was defended by two German armies—the 5th Panzer and the 15th Army. The latter was in the process of being redeployed to contain the American bridgehead across the Rhine during the Battle of Remagen. Both formations were still capable of inflicting heavy losses in the event of a direct assault. Allied planners had long intended to seize the Ruhr, even before D-Day, but recognized that fighting through the densely populated urban and industrial region—home to millions—could, in the words of military historian Robert M. Citino, “easily turn into a super Stalingrad.” As a result, Supreme Commander Eisenhower’s strategy had always been to encircle the Ruhr rather than attack it head-on.

During March 1945, Field Marshal Albert Kesselring was appointed the supreme commander of the Western Front. By this stage of the war, German losses were mounting rapidly, and replacement rates failed to keep pace. Increasingly, the order of battle was composed of second-rate Volksgrenadier units and third-rate Volkssturm militia. In the Ruhr, Allied forces primarily faced the remnants of a shattered Wehrmacht, supplemented by SS training units, Volkssturm militia composed of aging men—including World War I veterans—Hitlerjugend units with boys as young as twelve, combat service support personnel, and Luftwaffe crews operating flak guns.

== Battle ==
=== Encirclement ===
Having crossed the Rhine, both army groups fanned out into the German hinterland. In the south, while the Third Army headed east, the First Army headed northeast and formed the southern pincer of the Ruhr envelopment. In the north, the Ninth Army, which since the Battle of the Bulge had been assigned to the 21st Army Group, headed southeast, forming the northern pincer, while the rest of the 21st Army Group went east and northeast. Even before the encirclement was complete, Allied activity against the Ruhr had a critical impact on Germany's economy—on March 26 Joseph Goebbels noted in his diary that no more coal was coming from the Ruhr.

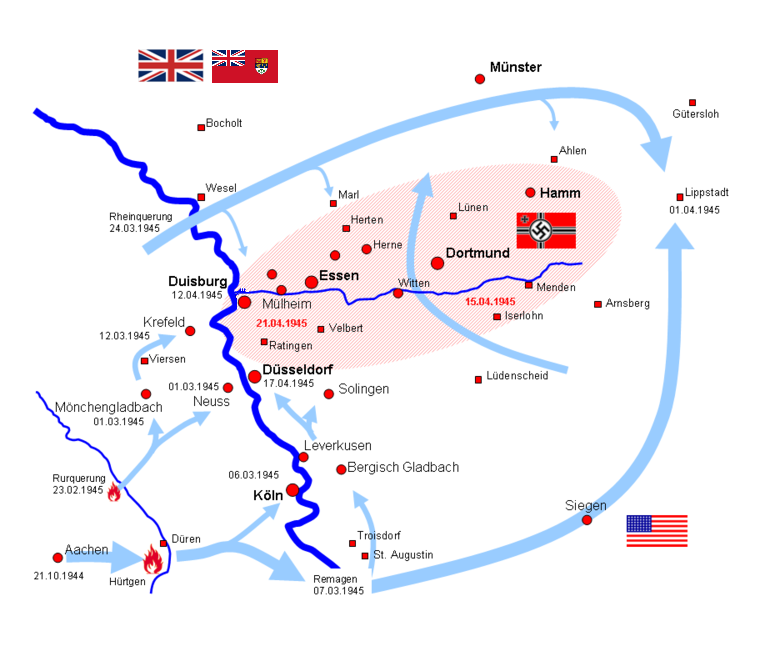
Encirclement of the Ruhr area

Lead elements of the two Allied pincers met on 1 April 1945, near Lippstadt. By 4 April the encirclement was completed and the Ninth Army reverted to the command of the 12th Army Group. Within the Ruhr pocket some 370,000 German soldiers, 14 divisions of Army Group B and two corps from the First Parachute Army, altogether the remnants of 19 divisions, and millions of civilians were trapped in cities heavily damaged by Allied bombings. Due to the presence of many rear area support units and Luftwaffe flak crewmembers, only 20% of Model's forces, or 75,000, had infantry weapons, with another 75,000 having pistols only and ammunition and fuel supplies were low. Model's requests for an airlift were dismissed out of hand by Hitler due to Allied air supremacy. All of Model's requests to withdraw or break out before or after the creation of the pocket were denied by Hitler, who expected "Fortress Ruhr" to hold out for months and tie down hundreds of thousands of Allied troops. The staff of Army Group B knew they only had food supplies for three weeks owing to the millions of civilians that also had to be fed.

While the main operations were directed eastwards to central and northern Germany, elements of three U.S. armies concentrated on the pocket, taking it section by section. Model's troops put up a strong resistance along the Dortmund–Ems Canal and the Sieg river-line, holding their ground from 4 April to 9 April and launching a counterattack against U.S. 75th and 95th divisions near Dortmund. For every German city or town that capitulated, another fought on for every building. Bürgermeisters of some German cities presented white flags to the invading U.S. troops, such as at Duisburg and Essen, while German troops at Dortmund, Wuppertal, and Hamm fought on. The presence of SS troops was a common element in most instances of all-out resistance.

In the south, the attack of the U.S. III Corps and XVIII Airborne Corps on 5 and 6 April was delayed by German troops, who skilfully used the rugged terrain of the 80% forested Sauerland district to force the Americans to fight for every stream, wood and town. The Germans fought strongly for the city of Siegen to prevent the Americans from gaining access to open ground. The heavily outnumbered and outgunned Germans could ultimately do nothing more than delay the advancing enemy, who covered approximately 10 kilometers per day. By 11 April German combat strength had weakened to the extent that they were only defending roadblocks and built-up areas along main roads, supported by a few tanks and assault guns or 2 cm flak guns. At one point, the Germans covered a valley in a thick smokescreen, delaying the 7th Armored Division for some time.

On 7 April the skies cleared and the IX and XXIX tactical air commands began to pound the remaining German defenders, strafing and bombing German troop concentrations and motorized and horse-drawn columns. The Allies were eager to get their hands on all German railway rolling stock and the U.S. pilots were banned from hitting this usual primary target, limiting the extent of Allied bombing operations. The rationing of U.S. artillery ammunition had been lifted and U.S. artillery in support of XVI Corps fired 259,061 rounds in 14 days.

=== Capitulation ===
On 10 April the U.S. Ninth Army captured Essen. On 14 April the U.S. First and Ninth armies linked up on the Ruhr river at Hattingen and split the pocket in two; the smaller, eastern part surrendered the next day. Model lost contact with most of his formations and commanders on 14 April. The German 15th Army under Gustav-Adolf von Zangen capitulated on 14 April, having lost all control over its subordinate formations. The Germans had continued the fight in the pocket despite no realistic hope of relief from the start, as they were tying down 18 U.S. divisions.

Rather than surrender his command, Field Marshal Model dissolved Army Group B on 15 April. Already on 7 April the extent of the American advance to central Germany had made any breakout impossible. Model's chief of staff Carl Wagener urged him to save the lives of German soldiers and civilians by capitulating. Model refused, as he knew Hitler would not authorize it. In addition, he could not reconcile surrender with the demands he placed on his officers and men throughout the war and his career. But he also wanted to save as many lives as possible for the post-war rebuilding. He decreed the discharging of all youths and older men from the army. By 17 April ammunition supplies would be exhausted, so the non-combatant troops would be allowed to surrender on that day. All combat troops were to either break out in organized formations or drop their weapons and go home, an implicit authority to surrender.

Even before this order was fully transmitted, German resistance began to completely collapse on 16 April as the remnants of German divisions and corps surrendered en masse. 5th Panzer Army commander Josef Harpe was captured by paratroopers of the 17th Airborne Division on 17 April while trying to cross the Rhine to German forces in the Netherlands. The commander of the Allied XVIII Airborne Corps, Matthew Ridgway, sent an aide bearing a white flag to Army Group B's headquarters, calling on Model to surrender but the field marshal refused, citing his oath to Hitler. When asked for instructions by the squad leader of a German unit that was still armed, Model told them to go home as their fight was over. He then shook their hands and wished them luck.

The western part of the pocket continued weak resistance until 18 April. Model tried to get to the Harz mountains through the American lines in a small column, but could not make it. Rather than surrender and face trial for war crimes, he committed suicide.

German anti-Nazi resistance groups in Düsseldorf attempted to surrender the city to the Allied armies in the so-called "Aktion Rheinland" in order to spare Düsseldorf from further destruction. However, SS units were able to crush the resistance, and executed a number of those involved. Executions of foreign laborers and political prisoners by the Gestapo had already been occurring since February. The act of resistance did accomplish a cancellation of further bombings on the city by another 800 bombers, through contact with the Americans. Düsseldorf was captured by Americans on 18 April without any notable fighting.

== Aftermath ==
=== Casualties ===
The 317,000 German soldiers from the Ruhr pocket, and some civilians, were imprisoned in the Rheinwiesenlager (in English, "Rhine meadow camp") near Remagen, a temporary prison enclosure.

The Americans suffered c.10,000 casualties while reducing the pocket. The Ninth Army lost 341 killed, 121 missing and just under 2,000 wounded. The First Army lost three times more, which brought the U.S. casualties to 10,000. The divisions of III Corps lost 291 killed, 88 missing and 1,356 wounded, while the 8th Division of the XVIII Airborne Corps lost 198 killed, 101 missing and 1,238 wounded. Casualty totals for the Fifteenth United States Army units on the western edge of the pocket are not listed in the official U.S. history.

The Americans liberated hundreds of thousands of hungry, diseased, and weakened prisoners-of-war and slave laborers, the former consisting mainly of Red Army soldiers who were very happy at their liberation. However, the liberated slaves tended to loot and terrorize the German population once released, and to clog up the roads in front of the U.S. columns. The German civilians were incredulous at Germany's defeat. The Americans also witnessed the destruction inflicted on Ruhr cities and towns by the Allied bombing campaigns; in many cities the U.S. troops wrested control of there was nothing but rubble, block after block. However, most of the German industrial machinery, situated in protected or decentralized locations, had survived the onslaught, unharmed, or required only minor repairs. Such equipment was quickly made operational after its capture.

== See also ==
- Battle of the Ruhr
- Falaise pocket
