= Jean-Pons-Guillaume Viennet =

French politician and playwright

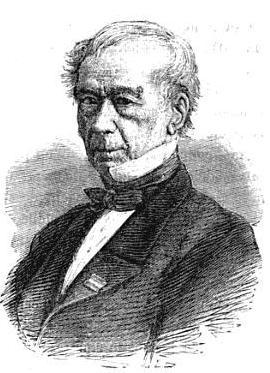
Jean-Pons-Guillaume Viennet

Jean-Pons-Guillaume Viennet (French: [ʒɑ̃ pɔ̃ ɡijom vjɛnɛ]; 18 November 1777 – 10 July 1868) was a French politician, playwright and poet. He was also a member of the Académie française and a prominent Freemason.

His long career as a soldier then a politician, playwright and poet lasted through political revolutions and literary wars, and is full of incident and travels. He had a talent for self-promotion within many regimes and got to know all political and literary dignitaries, all the while verging on impopularity. He said "I have counted up to 500 epigrams a year against me; anyone who escapes college to join a soap-opera thinks I should have his first kick". His name was like a red rag to a bull to Republicans and Romantics, but he avenged himself on his worst enemies by fables or epithets against them.

== Biography ==
=== Family ===
Viennet was born in Béziers. He was the son of National Convention-member Jacques Joseph Viennet and nephew of the priest Louis Esprit Viennet who, aged 40, was made curate of the église Saint-Merri in Paris and who in the early phase of the French Revolution in 1790 preached a sermon on the civil constitution of the clergy.

=== Napoleonic Wars ===
After being an excellent student at the college in Béziers and presiding over the club for children of his own age during the early years of the Revolution, he was destined by his family for a career in the church. However, at 19, he preferred to become a second lieutenant in the naval artillery. His first campaign was not a happy one. Sent to Brest, then Lorient, on 21 April 1797 he embarked on the Hercule. This ship had scarcely left harbour when it was sighted and pursued by two British cruisers, and a few artillery salvos later the Hercule had lost more than half its rigging and Viennet was taken prisoner. He then spent 7 months as a prisoner in the prison hulks at Plymouth and consoled himself by writing poetry and acting in a theatre he set up in the prison, putting on his own plays alongside tragedies and vaudevilles of the time. Returning to France in a prisoner exchange, he returned to his original corps.

In 1812, he won the favour of being invited to Paris, writing many epithets, tragedies, comedies and poems. Some of his epithets won prizes at the Jeux Floraux. He was trying to have his tragedy Clovis mounted at the Théâtre-Français when he received orders to rejoin his regiment immediately on its march to Saxony. He left Paris and was a captain in the 1813 Saxony campaign, assisting at the battles of Lützen and Bautzen (at the latter he was decorated personally by Napoleon). In the disastrous battle of Leipzig, he was again taken prisoner and did not return to France until the Bourbon Restoration, becoming attached to the Bourbon monarchy.

=== Bourbon Restoration ===
Viennet became aide-de-camp to général de Montélégier, himself aide-de-camp to the duc de Berry. Viennet did not return to the imperial armies during the Hundred Days and refused to vote in favour of the acte additionnel, thus forcing himself to procure a voyage to Cayenne. Only at the insistence of his father's friend Cambacérès was the order already signed by minister Denis Decrès revoked.

The Bourbons fled, but Viennet did not follow the duc de Berry to Ghent, for which the duke criticised Viennet despite his refusal to go back over to Napoleon's side. Left without a job, he returned to writing and became a journalist. He collaborated on the l'Aristarque, the Journal de Paris and the Constitutionnel until he was finally admitted to the corps royal d'état-major thanks to Gouvion Saint-Cyr. His many Épîtres date to this period.

On 17 July 1820, he put on his one-act opera Aspasie et Périclès at the Académie de musique but, though it ran for 16 performances it was not a success despite its masterful music thanks to an uninteresting libretto. That autumn, on 19 October, he finally found success with his tragedy Clovis, at the Théâtre-Français. He wrote other plays, mainly tragedies, which were not produced. Made chef d'escadron by seniority in 1823, he was demoted to the ranks in 1827 in the wake of the publication of his Épître aux chiffonniers in favour of the liberty of the press, a witty protest against hateful and absurd legislation. This only made him more popular and on 21 April 1828 he was elected député for the 2nd electoral arrondissement of Hérault (Béziers). He took his place among the French left of this time, supporting the parliamentary opposition which would lead to the July Revolution by his votes and sometimes by his speeches.

=== July Monarchy ===
Viennet voted in favour of the adresse des 221. Re-elected on 23 June 1830 with 55% of the votes, he contributed to the establishment of the July Monarchy and it was he who on 31 July announced the nomination of Louis-Philippe, the duc d'Orléans as lieutenant général of the kingdom to the people at the Hôtel de Ville of Paris on 31 July.

The new king returned Viennet to his rank as chef de bataillon. Re-elected as a député on 5 July 1831 with 65% of the vote, he sat in the ministerial majority. Dedicated to the new regime, but still with a burning and intolerant spirit, he was his party's "enfant terrible" and openly spoke in favour of its opponents' projects, hopes and watchwords. Even whilst in the Chamber of Deputies he continued to be vehemently outspoken, making sudden and biting attacks on the republicans, who he called paymasters of the counter-revolution and soon drawing scorn and whistles from them. A focus for Charivari and Caricature, he was subjected to all kinds of malignity, sarcasm and denigration.

The Académie française elected him a member on 18 November 1830, in seat 22 in succession to the comte de Ségur. The Académie also provided another arena for his controversies, and within it he and Baour-Lormian were among the most opinionated leaders of the absolute resistance to any hint of Romanticism.

Viennet was a particular friend of Louis-Philippe, who made him a peer of France on 7 November 1839. With continuing energy, Viennet pursued his literary works (novels, operas, tragedies, comedies, epithets and fables) as keenly as his loud political debates.

However, he was not spared as a peer any more than he had been as a député, with hatred for him lasting until the February 1848, in which he lost his patron at the Palais du Luxembourg. Occupied elsewhere during 1848, the satirical journals left him free for a moment. Later, he was highly thought of for being very dignified and firm with the men on 2 December.

=== Freemason ===
A Masonic dignitary in the Scottish Rite of France and its colonies, he became Grand Master of this obedience (with the title "Sovereign Grand Commander" of the "Supreme Council of France") from 1860 to 1868. He fought to maintain this rite's independence when the Second French Empire abused its authority by claiming to unite this rite with the French Rite under the direction of marshal Magnan, and recovering his youthful energy and regaining the popularity he had lost since the Restoration.

Viennet wrote until his last day, dying aged 90 in Le Val-Saint-Germain. He edited his own entry in the Dictionnaire de la conversation, to which he contributed many other articles. Joseph d'Haussonville, who replaced him at the Académie française, spoke his elogy on 31 March 1870. He was buried in the cimetière du Père-Lachaise in Paris.

== Main works ==
Viennet's setbacks in the theatre never discouraged him from writing, and he continued to produce works throughout his life. The list below does not include many works rejected by the Paris Opéra or the theatres and so never produced.

- Aspasie et Périclès, 1-act opera, music by Joseph Daussoigne-Méhul (nephew and student of Méhul), Paris, Théâtre de l'Académie royale de musique, 17 July 1820;
- Clovis, 5-act tragedy, Paris, Théâtre Français, 19 October 1820;
- Promenade philosophique au cimetière du Père-Lachaise (1824);
- Le Siège de Damas, 5 canto poem, preceded by a preface on the classicists and the romantics (1825);
- Sigismond de Bourgogne, 5-act tragedy, Paris, les Comédiens ordinaires du Roi, 10 September 1825;
- Sédim, ou les Nègres, 3 canto poem (1826);
- la Tour de Montlhéry, histoire du XIIe siècle, novel (1833, 3 vol.), republished in the collection Romans illustrés;
- Le Château Saint-Ange, novel (1834, 2 vol.);
- Les Serments, 3-act verse comedy, Paris, Théâtre Français, 16 February 1839;
- Fables (1843);
- Michel Brémond, 5-act verse drama, Paris, Théâtre de la Porte Saint-Martin, 7 March 1846;
- Épîtres et satires, suivies d'un Précis historique sur la satire chez tous les peuples (1847);
- La Course à l'héritage, 5-act verse comedy, Paris, second Théâtre-Français (Odéon), 29 April 1847;
- Les chêne et ses commensaux, fable (1849);
- L'0s à ronger (1849);
- La Jeune tante, 3-act verse comedy (1854);
- Arbogaste, 5-act tragedy (1859);
- Richelieu, 5-act prose drama (1859);
- Selma, 1-act verse drama, Paris, Théâtre de l'Odéon, 14 May 1859;
- La Franciade, 10-canto poem (1863);
- Histoire de la puissance pontificale (1866, 2 vol.), directed against the popes' temporal power;
- Souvenirs de la vie militaire de Jean Pons Guillaume Viennet, de l'Académie française (1777-1819), prefaced and annotated by MM. Albert Depréaux and Pierre Jourda (1929);
- Journal de Viennet, pair de France, témoin de trois règnes, 1817-1848. Foreword and afterword by the duc de La Force (1955).
