= Bombing of Düsseldorf in World War II =

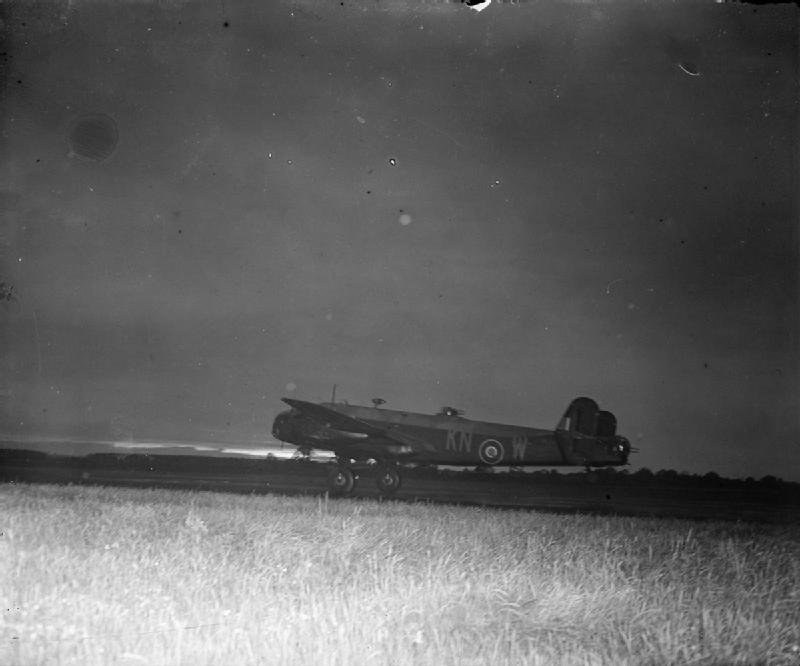
Takeoff of a Handley Page Halifax at RAF Elvington for the bombing of Düsseldorf.

During World War II, Düsseldorf was heavily destroyed by Allied aerial bombardment. The most severe attack occurred on June 12, 1943, when a firestorm was ignited through targeted bombing by the British Royal Air Force, largely destroying the historical city center, downtown, and other adjacent neighborhoods.

== Background ==
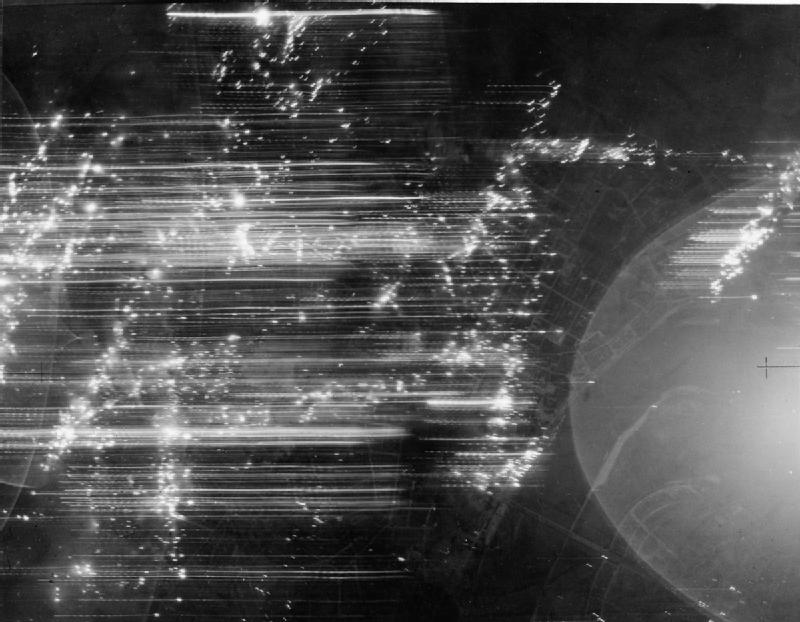
RAF aerial photos from the air raid on the night of June 11–12, 1943.

Düsseldorf had been a focal point of British air raids since the beginning of the war. The first British air raid on May 14, 1940, targeted the districts of Flingern and Oberbilk, hitting Hermannplatz and Dorotheenstraße, causing minor damage and resulting in seven injuries and one fatality. On December 7, 1940, approximately 700 incendiary bombs and about 50 explosive bombs fell on the city center, Pempelfort, Flingern, Oberbilk, and Benrath. Numerous more minor attacks followed. On the night of August 1, 1942, the people of Düsseldorf experienced the first major attack. This initial major attack marked the beginning of a series of assaults that ended with the destruction of more than half of Düsseldorf's buildings. The town hall was heavily damaged in another significant attack on September 11, 1942.

In total, over 243 attacks claimed the lives of more than 6,000 civilians.

== First major attack on the night of August 1, 1942 ==
During the 113th air raid on Düsseldorf on August 1, 1942, the first major attack, a British squadron dropped nearly 14,000 incendiary bombs, primarily over the city center, Oberkassel, and the southern neighborhoods. For the first time, the Königsallee was also hit, and significant damage occurred, especially in the area of Oststraße and Friedrich-Ebert-Straße.

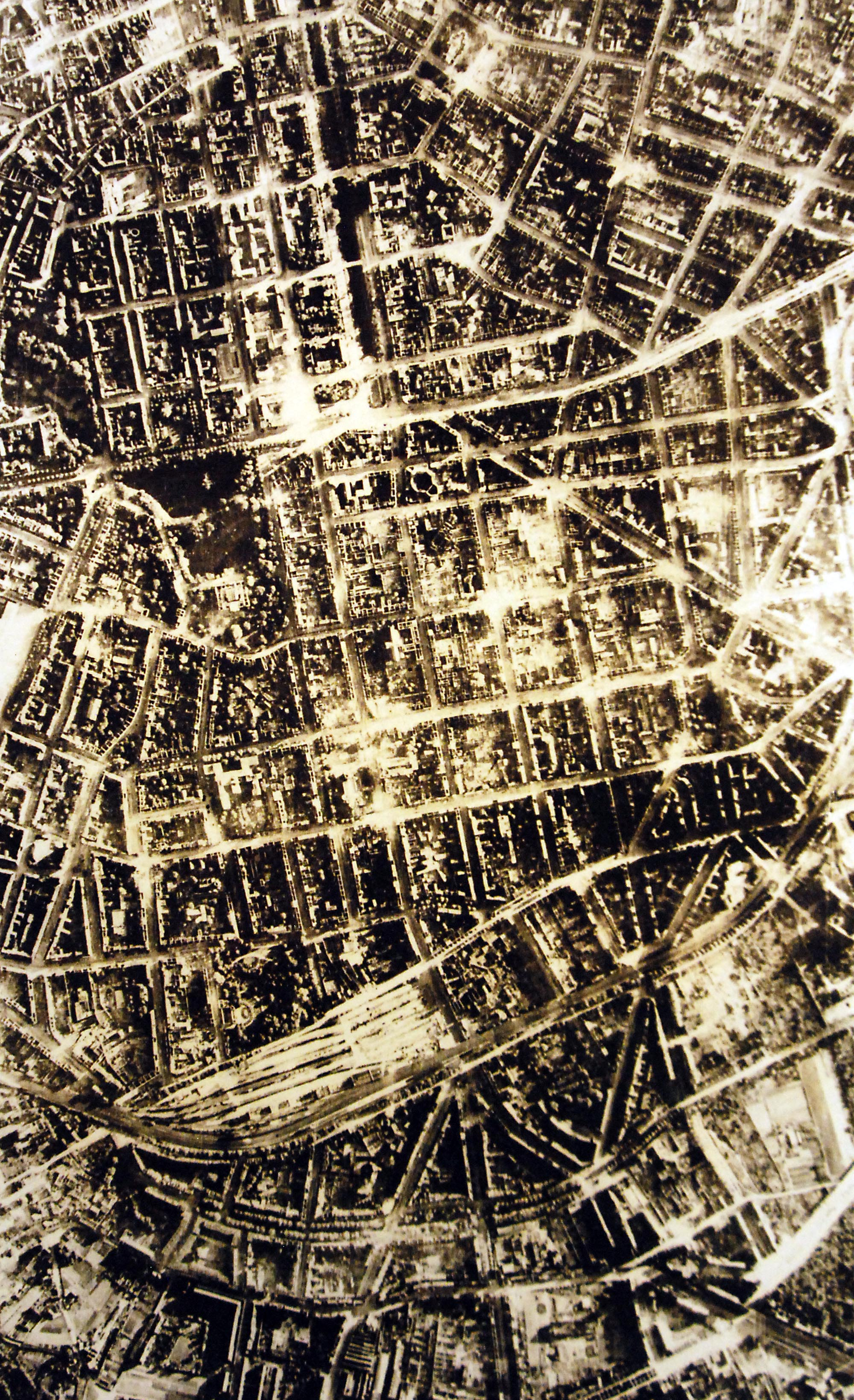
Aerial view of the destruction in the districts of Carlstadt, Stadtmitte, Friedrichstadt, Bilk, and Unterbilk one week after the air raid on June 12, 1943.

Düsseldorf mourned approximately 250 victims, while the neighboring city of Neuss had 34 casualties. About 12,000 residents were left homeless by the attack. Following the raid, 314 residential buildings were completely destroyed, 654 heavily damaged, 1,628 moderately damaged, and 9,030 lightly damaged. Various public buildings, industrial facilities, and Wehrmacht installations were also affected.

On that night, anti-aircraft guns and night fighters caused some of the 630 participating bombers to crash. A Wellington bomber crashed near Düsseldorf-Knittkuhl.

== Attack on June 12, 1943 ==
The precise selection of neighborhoods to be bombed was based on aerial photographs, population density maps, and fire insurance cadastre maps. The cadastre maps had been deposited by German fire insurance companies with British reinsurance companies before the war. The historic Old Town of Düsseldorf was chosen as the core area of the attack because it had the highest proportion of wood in the total building mass, making it the optimal core target area for igniting a firestorm in Düsseldorf.

Before the bombardment, the target area was delineated by Mosquito fast bombers using red and green marker flares. This was monitored by a master bomber flying at high altitude, who was in radio contact with the marker aircraft. The attack began at 1:15 am with the deployment of the marker flares.

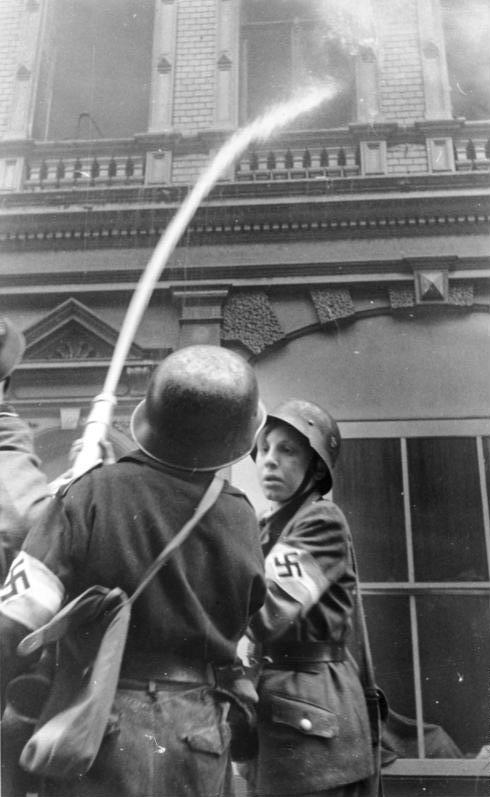
Hitler Youth emergency responders during firefighting efforts.

=== Bombing ===
The target area was the densely populated city center, especially the Old Town. The bombing commenced at 1:25 am, lasting for an hour and 20 minutes. Initially, 1,300 explosive bombs and several hundred air mines were dropped. The shock waves from the explosions tore open roofs. Subsequently, over 225,000 electron-thermite incendiary bombs were dropped over the city, falling into the exposed roof structures of the houses and setting them ablaze in a very short time. Within an hour, thousands of smaller building fires merged into a firestorm. In the attacked districts of Derendorf, Düsseldorf-Center, and the south side of Düsseldorf, a 4,000-hectare (9,900-acre) sea of fire emerged, totaling about 9,000 individual fires.

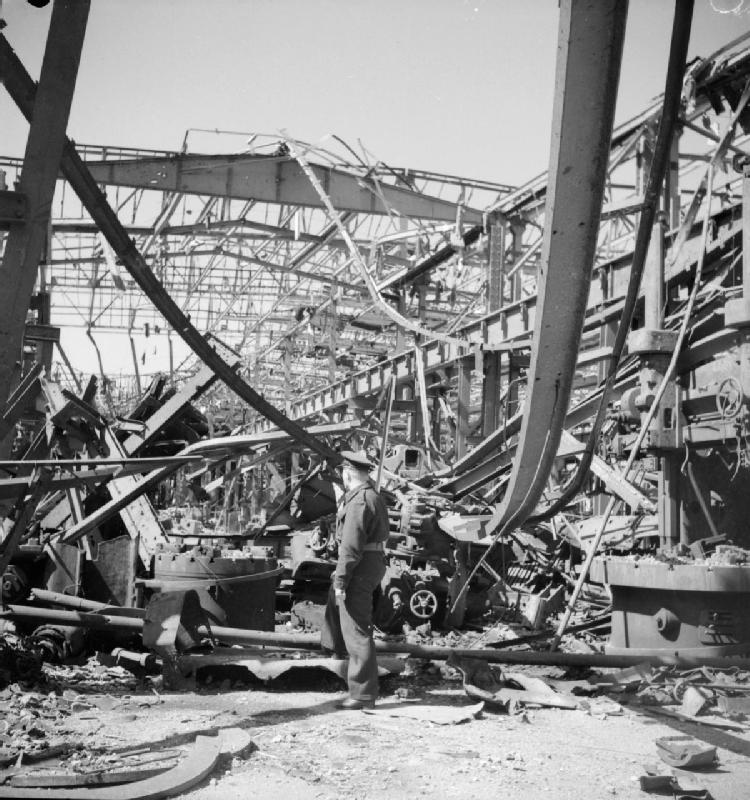
Destroyed industrial hall of the armament company Rheinmetall-Borsig in Düsseldorf-Derendorf (night of November 2–3, 1944).

=== Damages and casualties ===
During this major attack, approximately 600 people were killed, and more than 3,000 people were injured. Among the structures destroyed or heavily damaged were 16 churches, 13 hospitals, 28 schools, and several thousand residential buildings. Large parts of the city center, including Derendorf, Carlstadt, Friedrichstadt, Unterbilk, Bilk, Oberbilk, and the Southside, were utterly destroyed. Extensive damage occurred between Reeser Platz in the north and Klinikum in the south.

=== Further attacks and damage ===
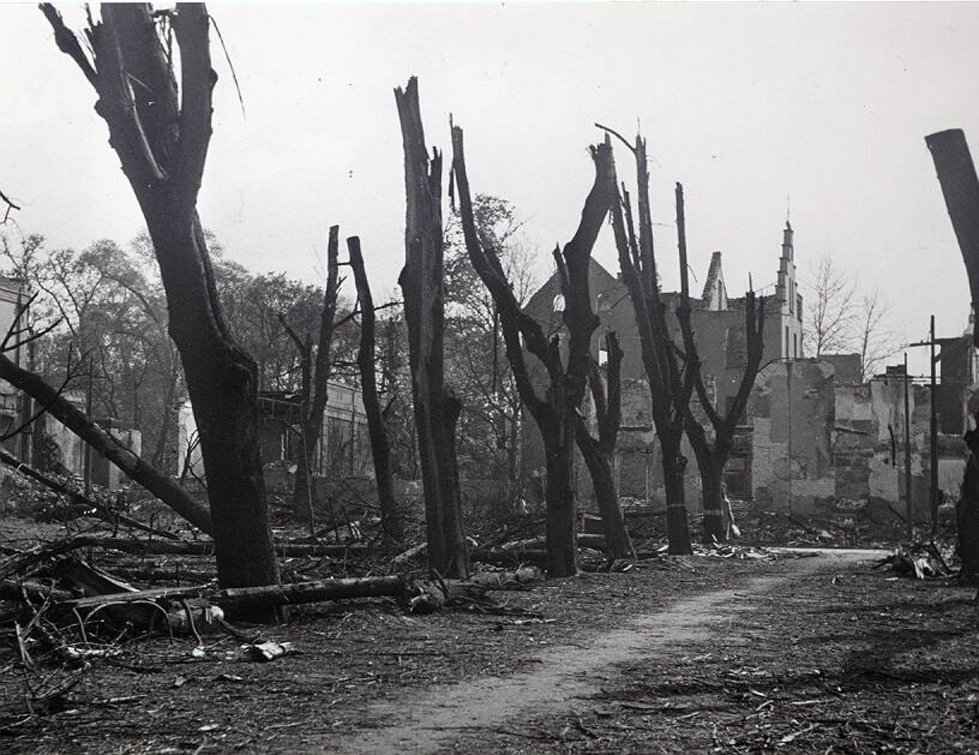
Image of the destruction in and around the Hofgarten after the bombing raid on September 23, 1944.

Another major attack on the night of November 3–4, 1943, claimed 622 lives. Even greater damages occurred on the night of April 22–23, 1944, when 1,200 people were killed, and 20,500 became homeless. A major attack on the night of November 2–3, 1944, resulted in 748 deaths and 15,000 homeless.

Subsequent attacks followed, leaving a massive devastation in Düsseldorf until the end of the war, with a total of 1.14 million incendiary bombs. In the core city area, 93% of all residential buildings, 96% of public buildings, and 93% of commercial buildings were destroyed or damaged. A large portion of the 535,000 residents at the beginning of the war had fled the city. At the war's end, fewer than 250,000 people lived amidst the ruins. 10 million cubic metres (350 million cubic feet) of debris had to be cleared.

=== Reception ===
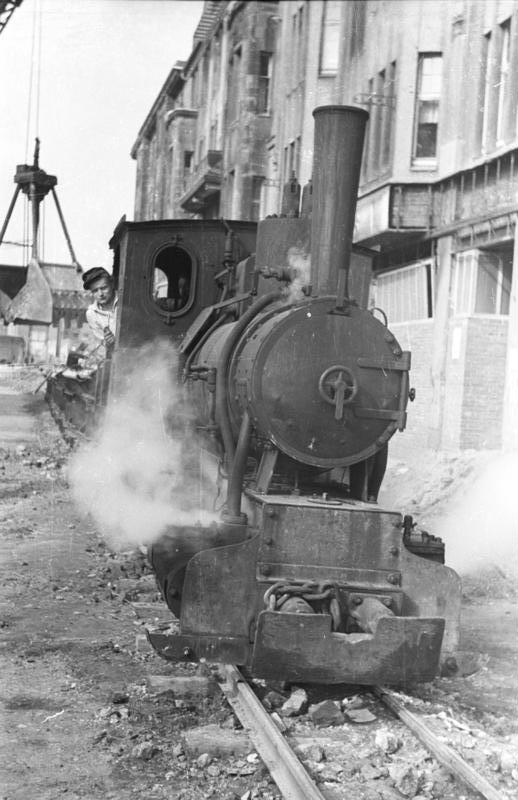
Debris clearance in 1948

The air raid on June 12, 1943, was explicitly mentioned by British Prime Minister Winston Churchill in a speech he delivered on June 30, 1943, during the Honorary Freedom of the City of London award ceremony. According to Churchill, this attack vividly demonstrated the superiority of the British Royal Air Force. In Düsseldorf, the air raid on June 12, which occurred on the Saturday before Pentecost in 1943, became known as the Pfingstangriff (Pentecost Attack).

== Sources ==
- Stadtarchiv Düsseldorf, IV 483, Garten- und Friedhofsamt, 25 September 1944; IV 481, Hauptamt, 15 March 1944 und Broschüre.
- Alfons Houben: Düsseldorf. Stunde Null. 1945/46 – Ende und Anfang, Düsseldorf 1985.
- Peter Hüttenberger: Die Industrie- und Verwaltungsstadt (20. Jahrhundert), In: Düsseldorf. Geschichte von den Ursprüngen bis ins 20. Jahrhundert, Bd. 3, Düsseldorf 1989.
- Dokumentation zur Geschichte der Stadt Düsseldorf. Im "Dritten Reich" 1935–1945, Quellensammlung, hrsg. v. pädagogischen Institut der Landeshauptstadt Düsseldorf, Düsseldorf 1983.
- Friedrich-Wilhelm Henning: Düsseldorf und seine Wirtschaft. Zur Geschichte einer Region. Bd. 2: Von 1860 bis zur Gegenwart, Düsseldorf 1981.
- Clemens von Looz-Corswarem: Die Stadt in Trümmern – Düsseldorf im Zweiten Weltkrieg. In: Der Düsseldorf Atlas. Geschichte und Gegenwart der Landeshauptstadt im Kartenbild, Köln 2004, S. 48 f.
- Clemens von Looz-Corswarem: Das Rechnungsbuch der Stadt Düsseldorf aus dem Jahre 1540/41. Ein Beitrag zur Stadtgeschichte in der Mitte des 16. Jahrhunderts. In: Düsseldorfer Jahrbuch 72 (2001), S. 13–95.
- Anna Schack: Das Haus Nr. 131, Flensburg/Hamburg 1946, Neuausgabe Berlin 2013 PDF
- Gaby und Peter Schulenberg: Ein Bunker für Jan Wellem. In: Archäologie im Rheinland 2002, Stuttgart 2003, S. 221–223.
- Olaf Steinacker: Bombenkrieg über Düsseldorf, Gudensberg-Gleichen 2003.
- Hugo Weidenhaupt: Kleine Geschichte der Stadt Düsseldorf, Düsseldorf 1983 (9).
- Volker Zimmermann: In Schutt und Asche. Das Ende des Zweiten Weltkrieges in Düsseldorf, Düsseldorf 1995.
- Marcel Lesaar: Luftangriff auf Düsseldorf und Neuss. Books on Demand, Norderstedt, ISBN 978-3-7460-9779-4
