= Combat of Goldberg =

Military conflict in the War of the Sixth Coalition

- Part of the War of the Sixth Coalition
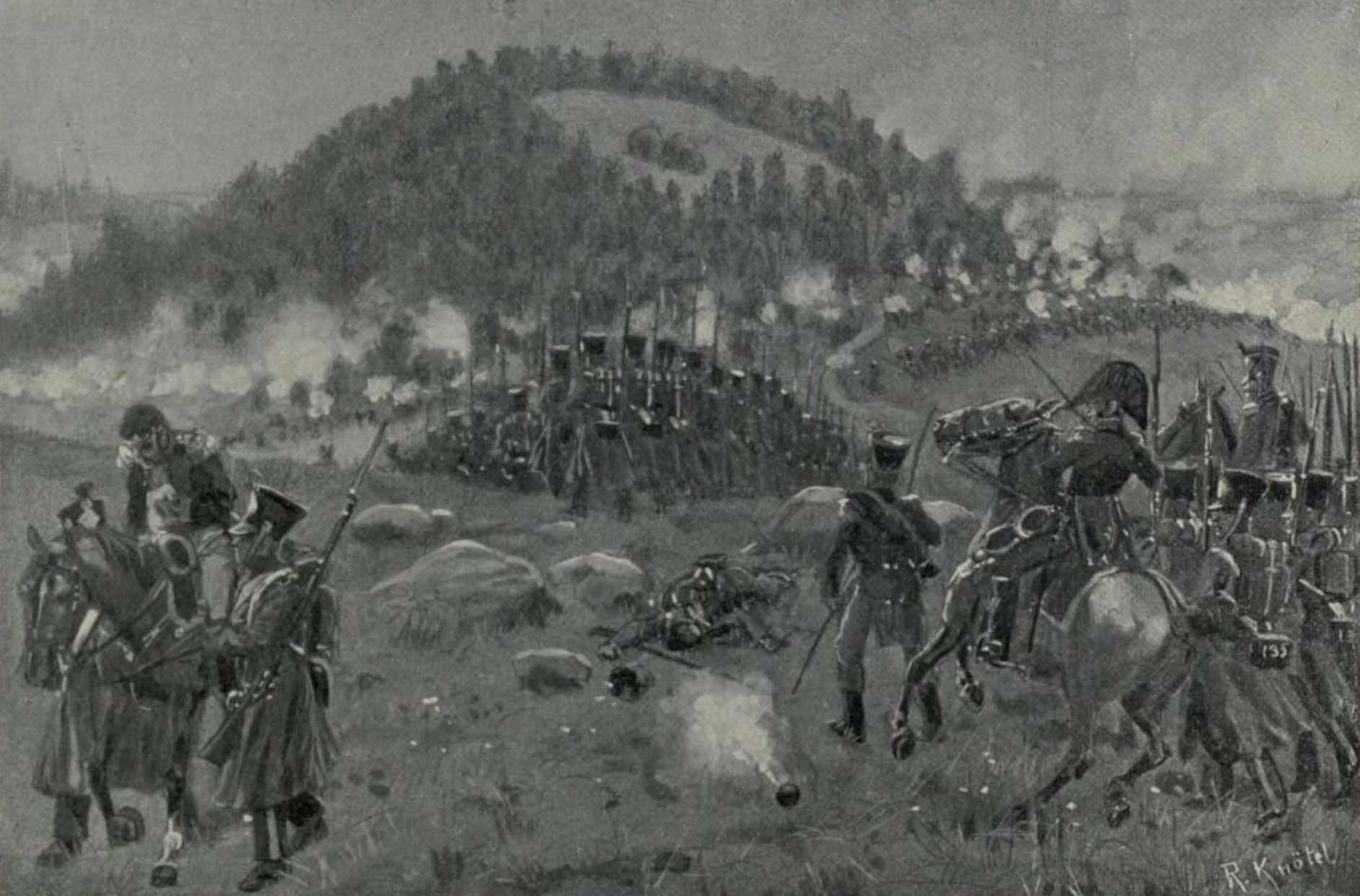
- Battle of Goldberg on August 23, 1813 (Richard Knötel, c. 1901)
Date	23 August 1813
Location	Goldberg, Silesia (Prussia)
Result	French victory

Belligerents
France; Saxony	Prussia; Russia

Commanders and leaders
(France) Etienne-Claude-Joseph Lauriston	(Kingdom of Prussia) Gebhard Leberecht von Blücher

Units involved
(France) V Corps (France) XI Corps	(Kingdom of Prussia) Prince of Mecklenburg's division (Russia) General Langeron's corps

The Battle of Goldberg was a battle taking place during the Napoleonic Wars, fought in the War of the Sixth Coalition on August 23, 1813. It was a minor victory for French military leader Étienne Macdonald's Army of the Bobr. Just 3 days after the Combat of Goldberg, Macdonald's army suffered an overwhelming loss, an event that helped lead to the effects of Napoleon Bonaparte's victory at Dresden, the War of Liberation, being undone.

== Battle ==
Etienne-Claude-Joseph Lauriston was serving as the temporary commander in Macdonald's absence during the battle. The French aimed to defeat the Allied forces in Goldberg and regain control of Silesia. This ultimately failed, though, as the Allied forces defended their position, inflicting heavy losses on the French side and contributing to the shift of momentum in the war.

XI Corps, reinforced by a cavalry division from Latour-Maubourg's corps, undertook a flanking maneuver across the river. On the left flank, General Gérard's division spearheaded an assault against the Prussian division under the Prince of Mecklenburg stationed at Niederau. Simultaneously, V Corps advanced upriver towards Seiffenau, a short distance southwest, intending to outflank the Allied left wing.

Despite facing a numerically superior French force, the Prince of Mecklenburg's division initially held firm at Niederau. However, the tide turned when a casualty-inducing artillery bombardment took place, causing major damage to the center of the Prince of Mecklenburg's division; a group of Silesian infantry. French soldiers successfully dismounted the Prussian guns, rendering them ineffective. Deprived of their main defensive firepower, the Prussian division was ultimately forced to retreat, leaving the strategic town vulnerable.

Emerging from Seiffenau, V Corps collided with Langeron's forces on the Wolsfberg heights. This tug-of-war saw the position captured and recaptured three times before Rochambeau's Mamelon cavalry tipped the scales, driving the Russians off with significant losses. Meanwhile, Sebas's 3rd Corps and cavalry guarded Liegnitz, while Sacken's corps crossed the Katzbach to occupy Pinkendorf.

Though Allied losses from August 21–23 reached 7,000 men, a crucial advantage emerged: Napoleon's absence. Recognizing this, Blücher initiated a renewed advance, leading to a decisive encounter battle on the Katzbach on August 26, mere kilometers northeast of the previous clashes. Macdonald's mishandling of his forces resulted in a devastating French defeat, permanently shattering their morale.

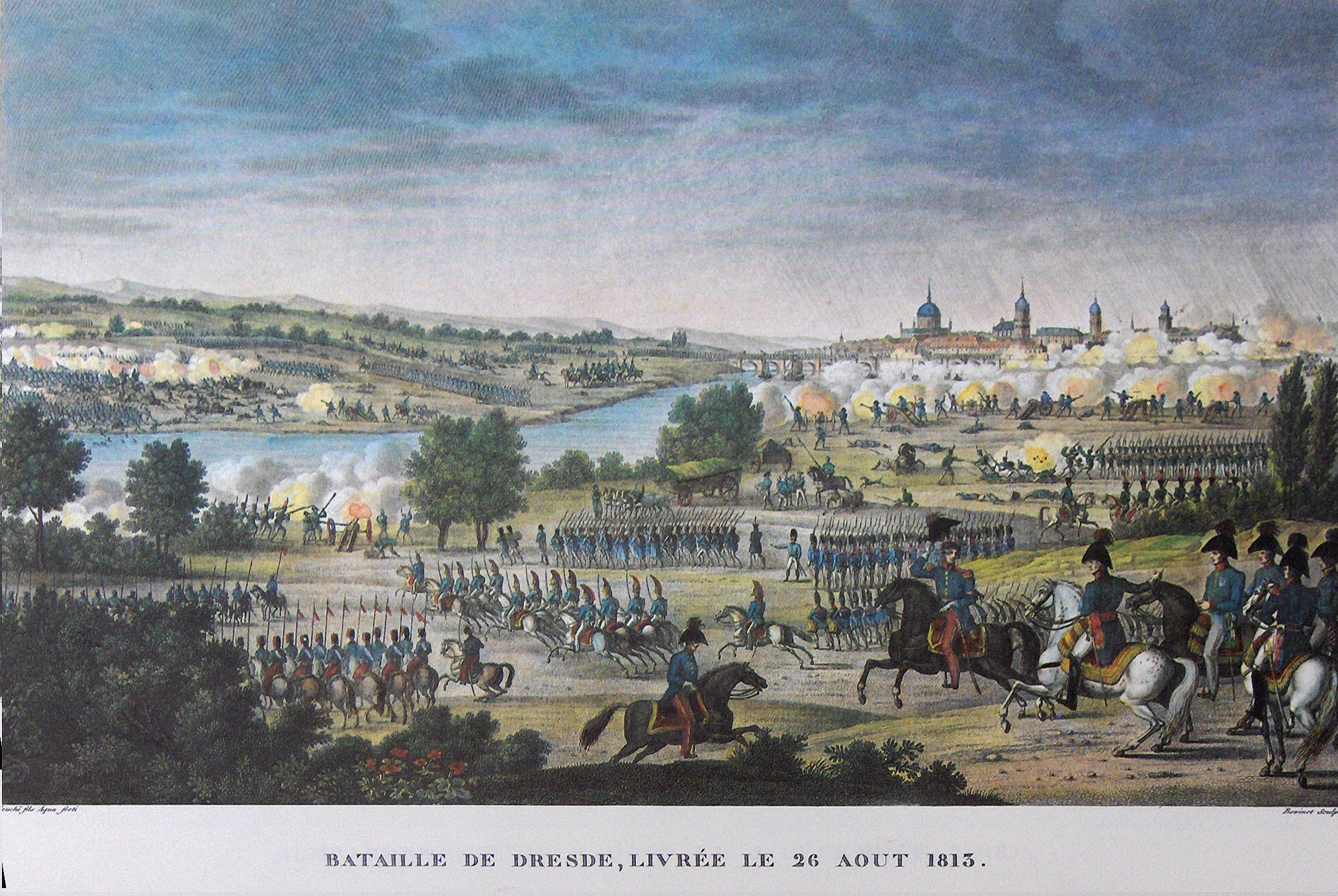
Battle of Dresden, 26 August 1813

== Background ==
In the opening act of the 1813 Autumn Campaign, Field Marshal Blücher of Prussia distinguished himself as the first Allied commander to take offensive action. Leading his Army of Silesia westward towards Saxony, he swiftly drew the attention of Emperor Napoleon, who prioritized countering the threat and directed his forces eastward. The ensuing encounter on August 21, known as the combat of the Bobr or Lowenberg, resulted in a tactical French victory. However, adhering to the strategic dictates of the Allies' Trachenberg Plan, Blücher skillfully disengaged without jeopardizing his main army through a wider engagement.

In the afternoon of August 23rd, Duke Charles II of Mecklenburg-Strelitz and his soldiers were stationed in an area near Goldberg; they probably did this to halt the approach of the French.

Napoleon was then compelled to leave his pursuit of Blücher when he heard the news that the Army of Bohemia was advancing towards Dresden. Napoleon was forced to leave his soldiers on the Bobr and continued west to replenish the situation in Saxony.

Marshal Macdonald was left in charge of a new Army of the Bobr, composed of III, V, and XI Corps. A miscommunication caused III Corps, led by Michel Ney, to temporarily head west, leaving Macdonald with only two groups of soldiers for a few days. He opted to push Blücher east across the Katzbach River (east of the Bobr) to Jauer then to evacuate to the Bobr and form a defending line. As the two available corps pushed east, Blücher withdrew to the Kazbatch.
