= Richard Meier (politician) =

Liechtenstein dentist and politician (1906–1982)

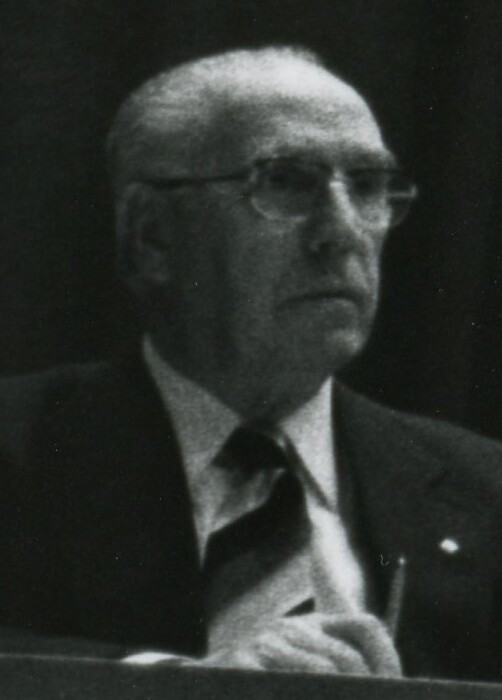
- Meier in 1981

Leader of the Liechtenstein Loyalty Association
- In office July 1940 – 1945
- Preceded by: Alois Schädler
- Succeeded by: Position abolished

Personal details
- Born: 8 December 1906 Nendeln, Liechtenstein
- Died: 28 December 1982 (aged 76) Schaan, Liechtenstein
- Party: Progressive Citizens' Party
- Other political affiliations: Liechtenstein Loyalty Association (1939–1945) Liechtenstein Homeland Service (1933–1934)
- Spouse: Marlene Heckmann (m. 1938, divorced)
- Children: 5
- Profession: Dentist

Richard Meier (8 December 1906 – 28 December 1982) was a dentist and political figure from Liechtenstein who served as the President of the Progressive Citizens' Party from 1945 to 1970.

== Life ==
Meier was born on 8 December 1906 in Nendeln as the son of Jakob Meier and Maria (née Biedermann). He had his matura at the Stella Matutina and then studied theology, philosophy, sociology and dentistry in the University of Innsbruck, Bergamo and in the University of Bonn.

From 1932 Meier worked as a private dentist in Schaan. He was a founding member of the Liechtenstein Homeland Service in 1933, however he soon left the party in 1934 due to its movement towards National Socialism. Following the 1939 Liechtenstein putsch, he was a founding member of the Liechtenstein Loyalty Association, which was designed to counteract the operations of the German National Movement in Liechtenstein (VBDL). He was the association's leader from July 1940 until its disbandment in 1945.

Meier was President of the Progressive Citizens' Party from 1945 to 1975. In 1973, he was a founding member of the Liechtenstein Society for Environmental Protection, and its chairman from 1973 to 1979. He was also a founding member of the Liechtenstein Dental Association and in 1960 he was awarded the title of "Princely Medical Councillor" by Franz Joseph II due to his service to the country and that of a dentist to the royal family.

Meier married Marlene Heckmann in 1933 and they had 5 children together, but got divorced at an unknown date. He died on 28 December 1982 in Schaan, aged 76.
