= Ranks and insignia of the Ordnungspolizei =

The wreathed Polizeiadler (police eagle) was worn as a cap badge and on the left sleeve by all uniformed police.

The ranks and insignia of the Ordnungspolizei were developed in 1936 after the nationalisation of Germany's regular police forces.

== Ordnungspolizei ==
Decals of the Ordnungspolizei used on various helmets

Ordnungspolizei (Orpo) ranks were based on local police titles and were considered a separate system from the ranks of the SS. If a member of the Order Police was already an SS member or - upon application - became an SS member, he was automatically awarded an SS rank according to his police rank. Within the police administration, only the police rank was used. In the SS environment, the equivalent SS title was usually mentioned first, even if the bearer usually had no function in the SS administration. In 1944, all Orpo generals also gained equivalent Waffen-SS ranks so that, in the event of capture by the Allies, the Orpo general would hold status as a military officer instead of a police official.

It was not until the decree of 16.4.1940 that the Order Police were allowed to show their SS affiliation in their uniforms: A small SS rune was sewn on below the left breast pocket.

== Ordnungspolizei rank insignia ==
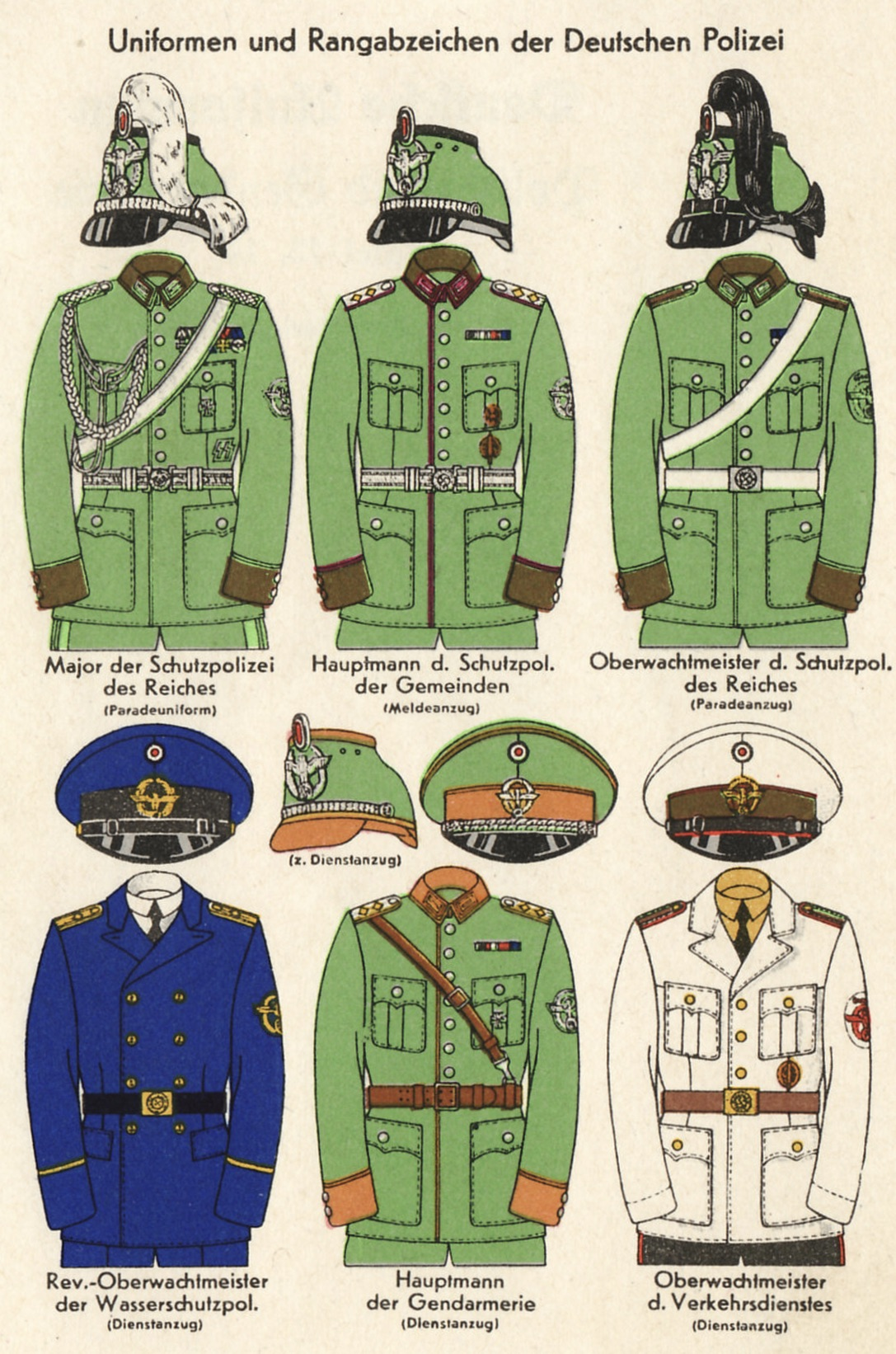
German police uniforms in 1936: Green service dress with brown collar and cuffs for Schutzpolizei (municipal and state protection police), orange collar and cuffs for Gendarmerie (state rural police), blue for water traffic police, and white traffic police uniforms; visor caps and German police shakos, the characteristic "bump hat" of the Schutzpolizei

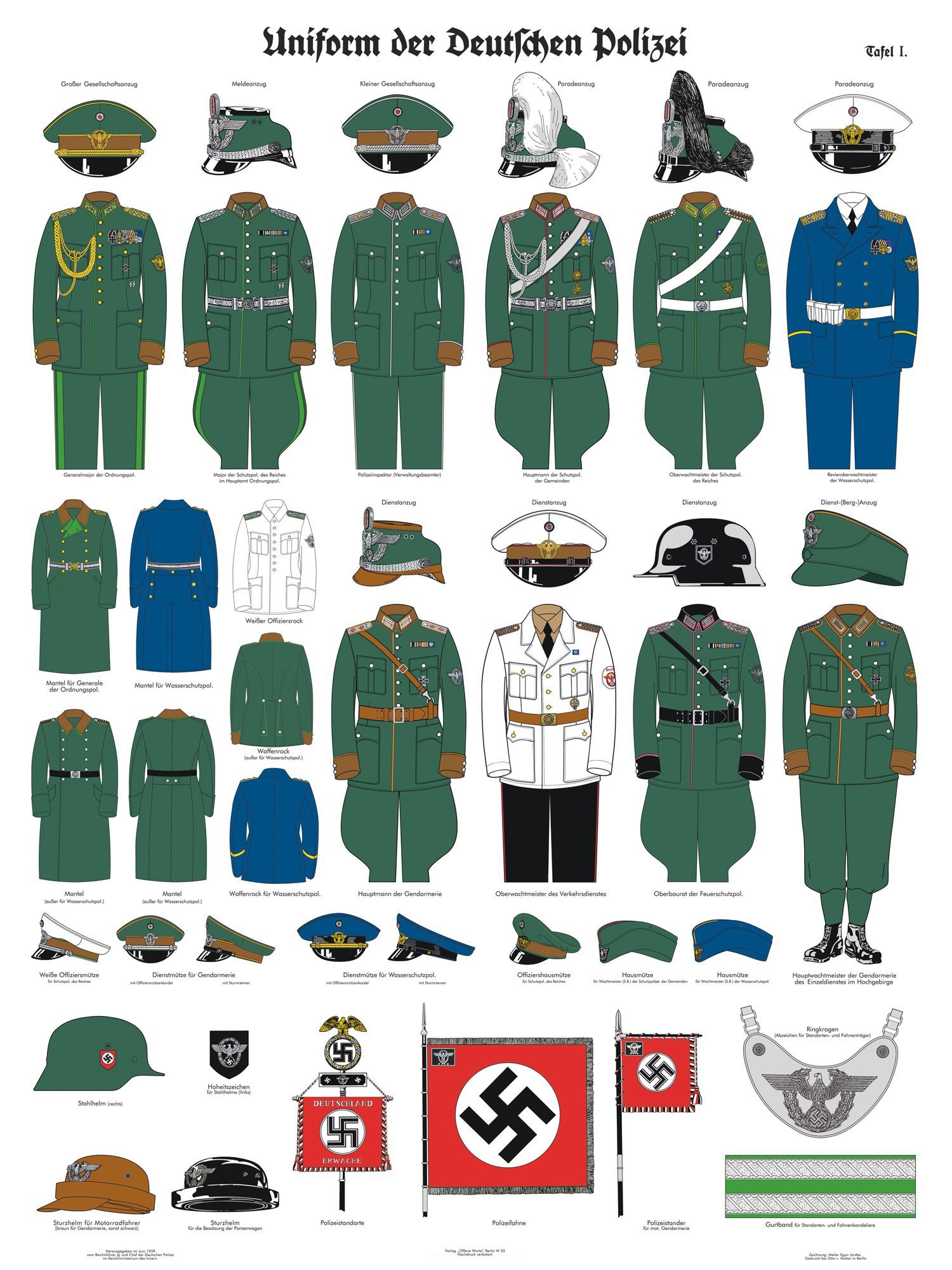
Uniforms of the different branches of the Ordnungspolizei.

In addition to collar and shoulder insignia, Ordnungspolizei also wore the wreathed police eagle on the upper left sleeve. The collar patch and shoulderboards were backed, and the sleeve eagle (below the rank of Leutnant) embroidered, in truppenfarbe, a colour-code which indicated the branch of police: green for Schutzpolizei (protection police) and police general officers, wine-red for Gemeindepolizei (municipal protection police), orange for rural Gendarmerie, carmine-red for fire brigades, gold for water traffic police, and light grey for administrative police.

=== General officers ===
Shoulder insignia	Collar insignia (1936–42)	Collar insignia (1942–45)	Orpo general rank	Equivalent SS rank
			Chef der Deutschen Polizei	Reichsführer-SS
			Generaloberst der Polizei	Oberst-Gruppenführer
			General der Polizei	Obergruppenführer
			Generalleutnant der Polizei	Gruppenführer
			Generalmajor der Polizei	Brigadeführer

Note: Since most police generals, increasingly as time went on, were also SS generals, they typically wore an SS uniform except at police-specific functions.

=== Field and junior officers ===
Shoulder insignia	Collar insignia	Orpo general rank	Equivalent SS rank
		Oberst der Schutzpolizei	Standartenführer
		Oberstleutnant der Schutzpolizei	Obersturmbannführer
		Major der Schutzpolizei	Sturmbannführer
		Hauptmann der Schutzpolizei	Hauptsturmführer
		Oberleutnant der Schutzpolizei	Obersturmführer
		Leutnant der Schutzpolizei	Untersturmführer

=== Enlisted, NCOs, and senior NCOs ===
The background was black for the Sicherheitsdienst (who wore the SS uniform but with the police rank insignia), dark brown for regular police units, and ginger brown for the Feldgendarmerie.

The collar, sleeve cuffs, cap band and piping (both officers and NCO ranks) were dark brown for regular police units and ginger brown for the Feldgendarmerie.

Shoulder insignia	Collar insignia	Orpo general rank	Translation	Equivalent SS rank	Equivalent U.S. Army rank
		Meister	Master	None	(Warrant officer)
		Hauptwachtmeister	Chief watch master	Hauptscharführer	(Master sergeant)
		Revieroberwachtmeister (Schupo) Bezirksoberwachtmeister (Gendarmerie) Zugwachtmeister (Kasernierte Polizei)	Precinct senior watch master District senior watch master Platoon watch master	Oberscharführer	(Technical sergeant)
		Oberwachtmeister	Senior watch master	Scharführer	(Staff sergeant)
		Wachtmeister	Watch master	Unterscharführer	(Sergeant)
		Rottmeister	Team master	Rottenführer	(Corporal)
		Unterwachtmeister	Junior watch master	Sturmmann	Constable (Private first class)
No insignia		Anwärter	Candidate	Mann	Constable cadet (Private)

== Rank and pay ==
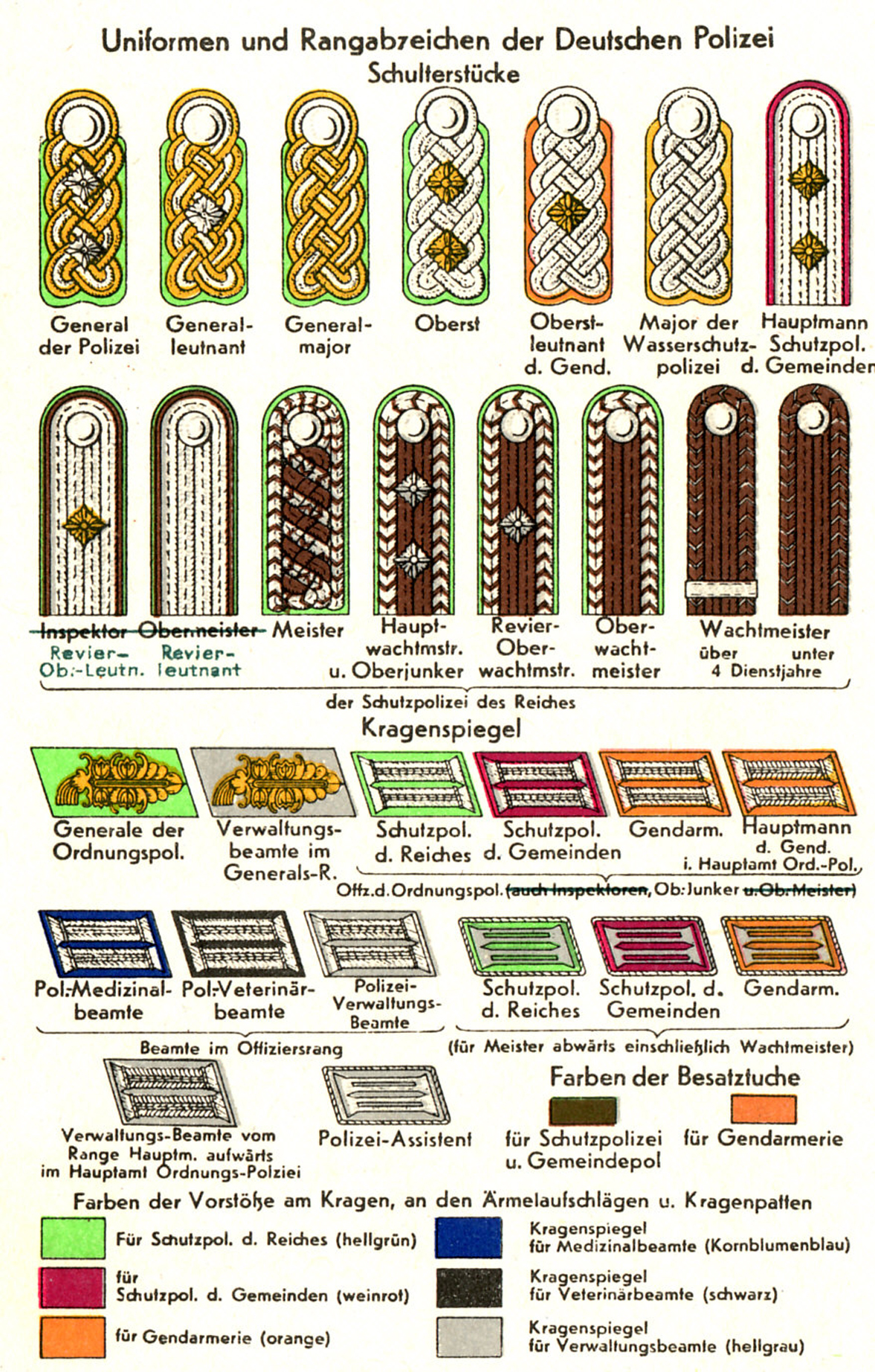
German police insignia in 1936: Shoulderboards (Schulterstücke), collar patches (Kragenspiegel), and branch colours (Truppenfarbe)

Policemen were promoted according to a regulated career system from Anwärter to Hauptwachtmeiser. Having served in the military for two years, promotion to Rottwachtmeister took place after two years in the police; to Wachtmeister after four years; to Oberwachtmeister after six years; to Revieroberwachtmeister after seven years. After twelve years, policemen were guaranteed a promotion to Hauptwachtmeister. Selection for promotion to Meister could take place after 16 years. Some Meisters could be selected for promotion to Revierleutnant and then Revieroberleutnant. After five year as a police lieutenant, and at an age of at least 50 years, promotion to Revierhauptmann could take place. Promotion for officers was determined by merit and seniority. Promotion to Hauptmann required a written civil service exam, while promotion to Major required a three months promotional course at a police officer school. A special police general staff school was opened for this purpose in Dresden.

Pay grade	Annual Pay Reichsmark (RM) (basic pay without allowances)	Mannschaften (Enlisted) Unterführer (NCO) Revieroffiziere	Offiziere (Officers)
-	..	Anwärter	
-	..	Anwärter with more than 6 months service	
-	..	Unterwachtmeister	
A8c5	1,536	Rottwachtmeister	
A8c4	1,920	Wachtmeister	
A8c3	2,040	Oberwachtmeister	
A8c2	2,340	Revieroberwachtmeister	
A8c1	2,370	Hauptwachtmeister with less than 12 years service	
A8a	2,100–2,800	Hauptwachtmeister with more than 12 years service	
A7c	2,000–3,000	Hauptwachtmeister appointed before April 12, 1943	
A7a	2,350–3,500	Meister	
A5b	2,300–4,200	Obermeister; Revierleutnant	
A4e	2,800–4,600		Leutnant
A4e	2,800–4,600		Oberleutnant
A4c2	2,800–5,000	Inspektor; Revieroberleutnant	
A4c1	2,800–5,300	Revierhauptmann	
A3b	4,800–6,900		Hauptmann
A2c2	8,400		Major
A2b	9,700		Oberstleutnant
A1a	12,600		Oberst
B7a	16,000		Generalmajor
B4	19,000		Generalleutnant
B3a	24,000		General

Mean annual pay for an industrial worker was 1,459 Reichsmarks in 1939, and for a privately employed white-collar worker 2,772 Reichsmarks.
