= Ordnungspolizei =

Uniformed police force of Nazi Germany (1936–1945)

Order Police Ordnungspolizei
- Orpo flag

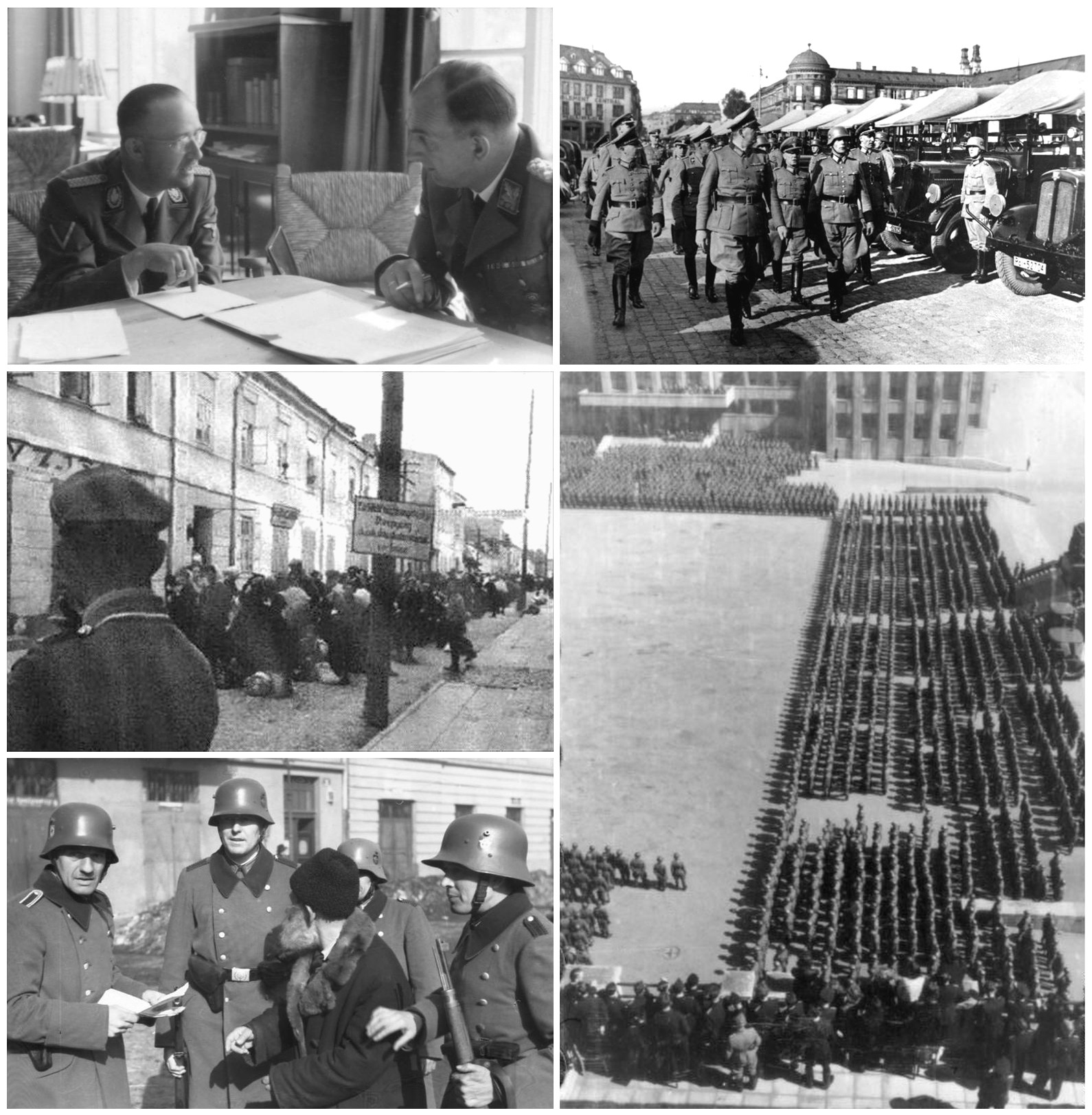
- Clockwise from top left: Kurt Daluege (right), Chief of the Order Police, with Heinrich Himmler, 1943; Unit inspection at Strasbourg, 1940: Daluege (centre), with Bomhard, and Winkler; Ordnungspolizei in Minsk, Reichskommissariat Ostland, 1943; Police roundup in the Kraków Ghetto, January 1941; Biała Podlaska Ghetto liquidation action, 1942
- Common name: Grüne Polizei
- Abbreviation: Orpo

Agency overview
- Formed: 26 June 1936; 90 years ago
- Dissolved: 1945; 81 years ago
- Employees: approx. 401,300 (1944 est.)
- Legal personality: Governmental: Government agency

Jurisdictional structure
- Legal jurisdiction: Germany; Occupied Europe
- General nature: Civilian police

Operational structure
- Headquarters: Berlin NW 7, Unter den Linden 72/74; 52°30′26″N 13°22′57″E
- Elected officers responsible: Heinrich Himmler 1936–1943, Reichsführer-SS and Chief of German Police; Wilhelm Frick (nominally) 1936–1943, Interior Minister; Heinrich Himmler 1943–1945, Interior Minister
- Agency executives: Kurt Daluege, Chief of Order Police, 1936–1943; Alfred Wünnenberg, Chief of Order Police, 1943–1945
- Parent agency: Interior Ministry

The Ordnungspolizei (Orpo, German: [ˈɔʁdnʊŋspoliˌtsaɪ], meaning 'Order Police') were the uniformed police force in Nazi Germany from 1936 to 1945. The Orpo was absorbed into the Nazi monopoly of power after regional police jurisdiction was removed in favour of the central Nazi government ("Reich-ification", Verreichlichung, of the police). In 1936, Heinrich Himmler, the commander (Reichsführer-SS) of the Schutzstaffel (SS), was appointed Chief of the German Police in the Interior Ministry. The top and upper leadership positions of the Orpo were filled by police officers who belonged to or had joined the SS. Owing to their green uniforms, Orpo members were also referred to as Grüne Polizei (Green Police). (Note: For Generaloberst of the Police and SS-Oberst-Gruppenführer Kurt Daluege, the introduction of the green police uniform represented "an outward manifestation of the new relationship between the people and the police.") The force was established as a centralised organisation based in Berlin uniting the municipal, city, and rural uniformed police that had been previously organised on a state-by-state basis.

The Ordnungspolizei encompassed virtually all of Nazi Germany's law-enforcement and emergency response organisations, including fire brigades, coast guard, and civil defence. Himmler and Kurt Daluege, chief of the Orpo, worked to transform the police force into militarised formations ready to serve the regime's aims of conquest and racial annihilation. Police troops were first formed into battalion-sized formations for the invasion of Poland, where they were deployed for security and policing purposes, also taking part in executions and mass deportations. During World War II, the force was tasked with policing the civilian population of the occupied and colonised countries. In 1941, the Orpo's activities escalated to genocide after the Order Police battalions formed into independent regiments or were attached to Wehrmacht security divisions and Einsatzgruppen. Independently and in collaboration with those units, members of the Orpo perpetrated crimes against humanity and mass-murder during the Holocaust; however, many were never put on trial for their crimes.

== History ==
Almost immediately after the Nazis seized power, they instituted measures to gain political control of German police and to use them against their perceived enemies. The commander of the SS, Reichsführer-SS Heinrich Himmler, had already been deputy chief of the Prussian secret police, when by decree of 17 June 1936, he was appointed Chief of the Police force; he performed both functions in parallel and was officially and publicly referred to as "Reichsführer-SS and Chief of the German Police in the Reich Ministry of the Interior". Although nominally subordinate to Interior Minister Wilhelm Frick, Himmler could participate in meetings of the Reich Cabinet—when and if police agendas were discussed. In 1943, Himmler himself was appointed Minister of the Interior.

Traditionally, law enforcement in Germany had been a state and local matter. When Himmler was given the lead over all of Germany's uniformed law enforcement agencies in 1936, he divided the police into two main areas: the Ordnungspolizei (Orpo or Order Police) under the command of Kurt Daluege and the Sicherheitspolizei (SiPo or security police) under Reinhard Heydrich. The Orpo assumed duties of regular uniformed law enforcement while the SiPo was made up by the combined forces of the Geheime Staatspolizei (Gestapo; secret state police) and the Kriminalpolizei (Kripo; criminal investigation police). The Gestapo was a political police agency with additional legally guaranteed powers of arrest. On 27 September 1939, shortly after the start of World War II, the SiPo and the Sicherheitsdienst (SD; SS security service) were folded into the Reich Security Main Office (Reichssicherheitshauptamt or RSHA). The RSHA symbolised the close connection between the SS (a party organisation) and the police (a state organisation). The Order Police (uniformed police, enforcement police) remained in the Ministry of the Interior. Himmler's multiple attempts to increase the proportion of SS members in the Orpo failed. Nonetheless, his reorganisation of the police under the RSHA enabled him to have "watchdogs" in multiple army districts and coordinated the power of the SS, SiPo, and Orpo, which historian Helmut Langerbein says "perverted normal police work".

Himmler pursued the amalgamation of SS and police into a form of "State Protection Corps" (Staatsschutzkorps), and used the expanded reach the police powers gave him to persecute ideological opponents of the Nazi regime and "undesirables" such as Jews, freemasons, churches, homosexuals, Jehovah's Witnesses, and other groups defined as "asocial". The Nazi conception of criminality was racial and biological, holding that criminal traits were hereditary, and had to be exterminated to purify German blood. As a result, even ordinary criminals were consigned to concentration camps to remove them from the German racial community (Volksgemeinschaft), where many of them were murdered or died from maltreatment.

The Order Police was one—among several—of the executing organisations that facilitated inhumane goals pursued by Himmler and the RSHA, transforming and reorienting police functions into part of the Nazi security apparatus as they prepared for war. Instructions for the Orpo came through the regional political administrative authorities and/or the Higher SS and Police Leaders (HSSPF)—the latter had authority to command both police branches and the SS-forces, because Himmler intended all along to establish harmony between the police and the SS. (Note: As early as 1937, the Order Police were already authorised to wear the SS runes on their uniforms.) Most of the battalions of the Order Police troops in the east were deployed for the expulsion and extermination of the Jewish population, since parts were assigned to the SS Einsatzgruppen. Their personnel were used to guard ghettos or to carry out mass shootings. Order police played an executive role in the Holocaust by providing men for the tasks involved, "both career professionals and reservists, in both battalion formations and precinct service" (Einzeldienst).

=== Indoctrination ===
Before the Nazi seizure of power, there was already a penchant for nationalistic beliefs and militarism among police officers in Germany, since most of its members consisted of men who had fought in World War I. Many officers of the police forces in Weimar believed the causation of Germany's loss in that war was bound up in the myths of being stabbed in the back by profiteers and Jews, which certainly contributed to their willingness to believe the National Socialist message. Beginning in February 1933, Nazi minister Hermann Göring issued a decree that Nazi party members and those in related organisations "were to receive priority as applicants for the Order Police." Just a few months later, Kurt Daluege issued a secret memorandum that emphasised eight to ten weeks worth of ideological indoctrination for SA and SS members transitioning into the Order Police at the rank of captain or higher, to ensure "close ties between the state instruments of power [the police] and the SA and SS."

By 1935, there was an increased national political curricula and intensive ideological training by the "Comradeship of the German Police" (Kameradschaftsbund der deutschen Polizei). Monthly national political lectures were instituted, and all police officers were encouraged to attend courses in state and party training facilities. Historian Edward B. Westermann writes that the "transformation of the police into political soldiers and instruments of genocide occurred in large part due to the efforts of Heinrich Himmler and Kurt Daluege to create an organizational culture within the Ordnungspolizei that married a "martial attitude" with Nazi racial ideology." In keeping with Nazi ideological programmatic lines, the Order Police, alongside the SS, played a key role in implementing Nazi racial policies. Unlike the SS, whose members voluntarily aligned with its ideology, the police required extensive ideological training to adopt and support the SS's goals, which was generally accepted due to a combination of Nazi propaganda, latent antisemitism, and a societal disposition towards obedience to authority.

Within the administrative organ (Verwaltungspolizei) for instance, the Order Police were required to read specific history books and essays on Nazi ideology, which were integrated into their practical police training and exams, ensuring alignment with Nazi goals. Training for State Protection Police (Schutzpolizei) at the Berlin-Schöneberg School in 1937 included 44 weekly hours focused on police and criminal law, with two hours dedicated to national politics and ideological training by SS instructors. Similarly, the curriculum included history and National Socialist ideology. (Note: In June 1938, Nazi Propaganda Minister Joseph Goebbels recorded in his personal diary how he spoke to a group of 300 policemen in Berlin, who he really "got going"; he added, "Against all sentimentality. Legality is not the motto, but harassment. The Jews must get out of Berlin. The police will help.") From the end of 1942 to the end of 1944, the Mariaschein Police School (later moved to Heidenheim) conducted monthly ideological training sessions for the Schutzpolizei with corresponding training of like kind being held at other police and police weapons schools across Nazi-occupied Europe.

== Organisation ==
The German Order Police had grown to 244,500 men by mid-1940. In preparation for the war of aggression and conquest, a replacement police force was set up as early as 1937 to take over patrol and guard duties. This auxiliary police could be activated by decree for service in their home districts and had grown to over 90,000 by the beginning of the war. These older men were drafted and conscripted into the reserve police, and in the course of the war, veterans were also called up. The majority of them served in their home environment, some were deployed in police reserve battalions.

In 1936, Himmler divided the Nazi police into two branches. The central command office known as the Ordnungspolizei Hauptamt was housed in the old office building of the Prussian Ministry of the Interior in Berlin at NW 7, Unter den Linden 72/74. From 1936 to 1941, it consisted of two offices: the Command Department (Kommandoamt), responsible for finance, personnel and medical; and the Office of Administration and Law (Verwaltung), responsible for handling all administrative police, legal and economic tasks of the entire Order Police. In 1941, the Colonial Office, the Office of Fire Brigades, and the Office of Technical Emergency Aid were added.

While the Order Police was initially commanded by Kurt Daluege, in May 1943, he had a massive heart attack and was removed from duty. He was replaced by Police and Waffen-SS General Alfred Wünnenberg, who had previously spent his career as a professional police officer.

=== Branches of police ===
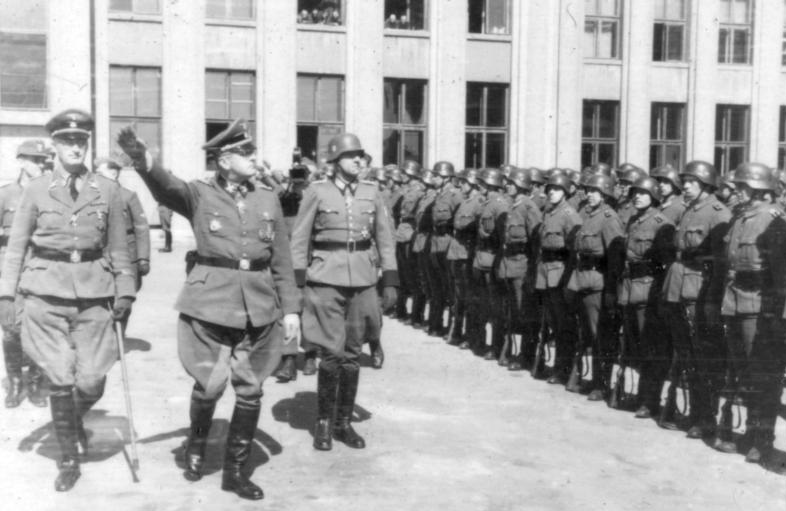
Ordnungspolizei in Minsk, Reichskommissariat Ostland, Weißruthenien, 1943

The administration police (Verwaltungspolizei) was the branch with overall command authority for all Orpo police stations. The Verwaltungspolizei also was the central office for record keeping and was the command authority for civilian law enforcement groups, which included the Gesundheitspolizei (health police), Gewerbepolizei (commercial or trade police), and the Baupolizei (building police). In the main towns, Verwaltungspolizei, Schutzpolizei and Kriminalpolizei would be organised into a police administration known as the Polizeipräsidium or Polizeidirektion, which had authority over these police forces in the urban district. Generally speaking, there were three subtypes of uniformed police forces within the Order Police, arranged according to the population size and density of the community they served." These were:

- Gendarmerie (rural police), who were tasked with frontier law enforcement to include small communities, rural districts, and mountainous terrain.
- Municipal protection police (Gemeindepolizei) municipal uniformed police in smaller and some large towns.
- State protection police (Schutzpolizei), state uniformed police in cities and most large towns, which included police-station duties (Revierdienst) and barracked police units for riots and public safety (Kasernierte Polizei).
- Fire protection police (Feuerschutzpolizei), professional fire departments in most larger cities.

Inspectors of the Order Police in various branches were established in September 1936, overseeing the entire Order Police within their jurisdictions. At the start of the war, they were gradually renamed "Commanders of the Order Police" (BdO) and given greater authority, directly reporting to Higher SS and Police Leaders. Although fully integrated into the Ordnungspolizei-system, its police officers were still considered municipal civil servants. The civilian law enforcement in towns with a municipal protection police was not performed by the Verwaltungspolizei, but by municipal civil servants. Until 1943, they also had municipal criminal investigation departments, but that year, all such departments with more than 10 detectives were integrated into the Kripo.

Additional police units not entirely subordinate to the Hauptamt Ordnungspolizei or the Reich Security Main Office existed across Germany, which made them outside the regular Nazi police structure and were "staffed mainly by officials from the police and judiciary who had served under Weimar." (Note: Such elements in Nazi Germany included: the "Railway Criminal Investigative Service" (Reichsbahnfahndungsdienst), and the "Railway Protection Police" (Bahnschutzpolizei)—both subordinate to the Deutsche Reichsbahn; the "Postal Protection" (Postschutz) element, comprised by roughly 45,000 members tasked with the security of Germany's mail and other communications' media such as the telephone and telegraph systems; the "Forest Protection Service", (Forstschutzkommando); the "Game Warden/Hunting Police" element (Jagdpolizei); the "Customs & Border Guards" (Zollgrenzschutz) under the Finance Ministry; the "Agricultural Field Police" (Flurschutzpolizei); the "Factory Protection Police" (Werkschutzpolizei)—its personnel were civilians employed by industrial enterprises, and typically were issued paramilitary uniforms; the "Dam and Dyke Police" (Deichpolizei), subordinated to the Ministry of Economy; and the "Harbor Police" (Hafenpolizei) under the Ministry of Transport.) Despite the seeming independence of other functional policing and public safety organizations, they were still part of the Nazi state, which was monitored and controlled by the SS and its subordinated agencies, such as the Gestapo.

=== Leadership ===
No.	Portrait	Chief	Took office	Left office	Time in office	Party
1	Kurt Daluege	SS-Oberst-Gruppenführer; Kurt Daluege (1897–1946)	26 June 1936	31 August 1943	7 years, 66 days	NSDAP
2	Alfred Wünnenberg	SS-Obergruppenführer; Alfred Wünnenberg (1891–1963)	31 August 1943	8 May 1945	1 year, 250 days	NSDAP

== Police battalions in the East and the Holocaust ==
=== Pre-war deployments in the Protectorate of Bohemia and Moravia ===
The Order Police's involvement in the occupation of the Czech lands predated the full radicalization of its Eastern mission and constituted, in Westermann's formulation, a "dress rehearsal" for the criminal enterprises that would follow. These pre-war annexations included the deployment of 412 officers and 9,350 troops participating in the occupation of the Sudetenland in 1938; once present, their duties encompassed not only security activities but propaganda work among the local population, which earned commendations from Nazi Party officials. The absorption of the rump Czech lands in March 1939 deepened the commitment further during which some 6,500 policemen, organized into two police regiments comprising ten police battalions, assisted in the German takeover of Bohemia and Moravia under Hitler's direct order that they "remain continually in the Protectorate." Westermann concludes that these operations helped establish a "fateful precedent" whose ultimate expression would be the deployment of Ordnungspolizei formations in the extermination campaigns against the Nazi's alleged enemies in Poland and the Soviet Union.

Order Police chief, Kurt Daluege, specified that officer candidates were to be drawn preferentially from veterans of field operations in the Czech Protectorate (and later Poland), with "militarily exceptional and gifted men" receiving first consideration—their fitness for conventional police duties a concern only after the war. That martial capacity superseded investigative competence as the criterion for advancement reveals how thoroughly Protectorate service had been absorbed into Himmler's and Daluege's project of fashioning the Ordnungspolizei into a corps of "political soldiers."

=== Invasion of Poland ===
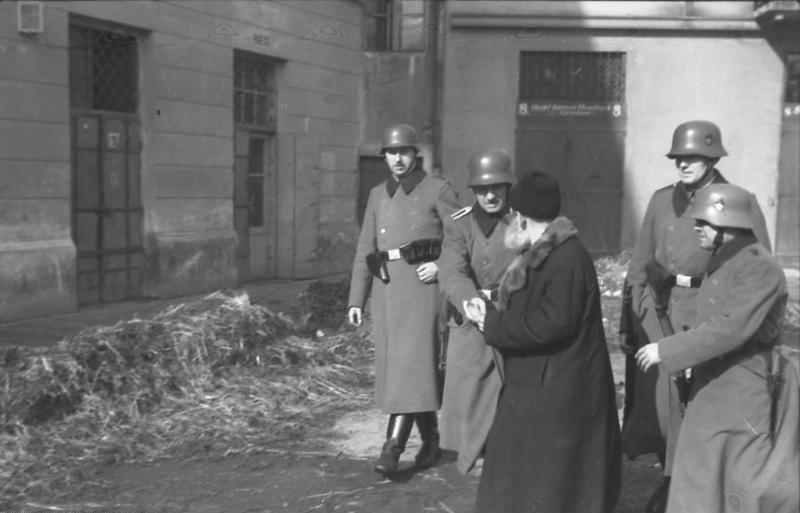
Ordnungspolizei conducting a raid (razzia) in the Kraków ghetto, 1941

By the time of the invasion of Poland in 1939, the Order Police had reached a strength of 131,000 men. Correspondingly, between 1939 and 1945, the Ordnungspolizei maintained military formations, who were trained and outfitted by the main police offices within Germany. Specific duties varied widely from unit to unit and from one year to another. Generally, the Order Police were not directly involved in frontline combat, except for Ardennes in May 1940, and the Siege of Leningrad in 1941. The first 17 battalion formations (from 1943 renamed SS-Polizei-Bataillone) were deployed by the Orpo in September 1939 along with the Wehrmacht during the invasion of Poland. One unit was organised under the command of Udo von Woyrsch and its members were specifically tasked to "carry out executions". (Note: Senior personnel in this unit were personally hand-selected by Werner Best under the guise that these men would "act ruthlessly and harshly to achieve National Socialist aims".) Under Woyrsch, these Orpo men terrorised the Jews of Bedzin, Katowice, and Sosnowiec, where they wrecked Jewish-owned property, shot dozens, and in one case in the town of Dynow, forced a dozen Jews into a synagogue before setting it on fire.

The battalions also guarded Polish prisoners of war behind the German lines, and carried out expulsion of Poles from Reichsgaue under the banner of Lebensraum. They also committed atrocities against both the Catholic and the Jewish populations as part of those "resettlement actions". After hostilities had ceased, the battalions—such as Reserve Police Battalion 101—took up the role of security forces, patrolling the perimeters of the Jewish ghettos in German-occupied Poland (the internal ghetto security issues were managed by the SS, SD, and the Criminal Police, in conjunction with the Jewish ghetto administration).

Each battalion consisted of approximately 500 men armed with light infantry weapons. In the east, each company also had a heavy machine-gun detachment. Administratively, the Police Battalions remained under the Chief of Police Kurt Daluege, but operationally they were under the authority of regional SS and Police Leaders (SS- und Polizeiführer), who reported, in a separate chain of command, directly to Reichsführer-SS Heinrich Himmler. The battalions were used for various auxiliary duties, including the so-called anti-partisan operations, support of combat troops, and construction of defence works (i.e. the Atlantic Wall).

Some of them were focused on traditional security roles as an occupying force, while others were directly involved in actions designed to inflict terror and in the ensuing Holocaust. While they were similar to Waffen-SS, they were not part of the thirty-eight Waffen-SS divisions, and should not be confused with them, including the national 4th SS Polizei Panzergrenadier Division. The battalions were originally numbered in series from 1 to 325, but in February 1943 were renamed and renumbered from 1 to about 37, to distinguish them from the Schutzmannschaft auxiliary battalions recruited from local population in German-occupied areas.

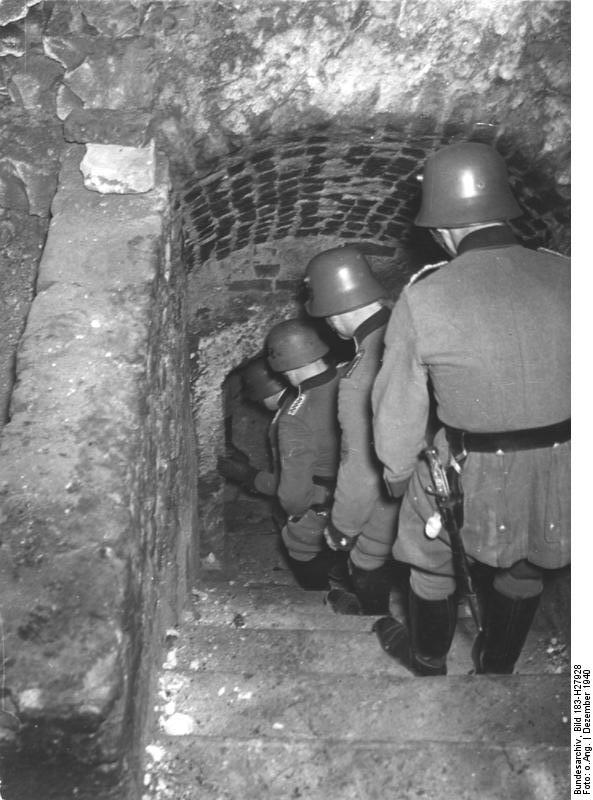
Order Police descending to the cellars on a Jew-hunt in Lublin, December 1940. The Lublin Ghetto was set up in March 1941.

=== Invasion of the Soviet Union ===
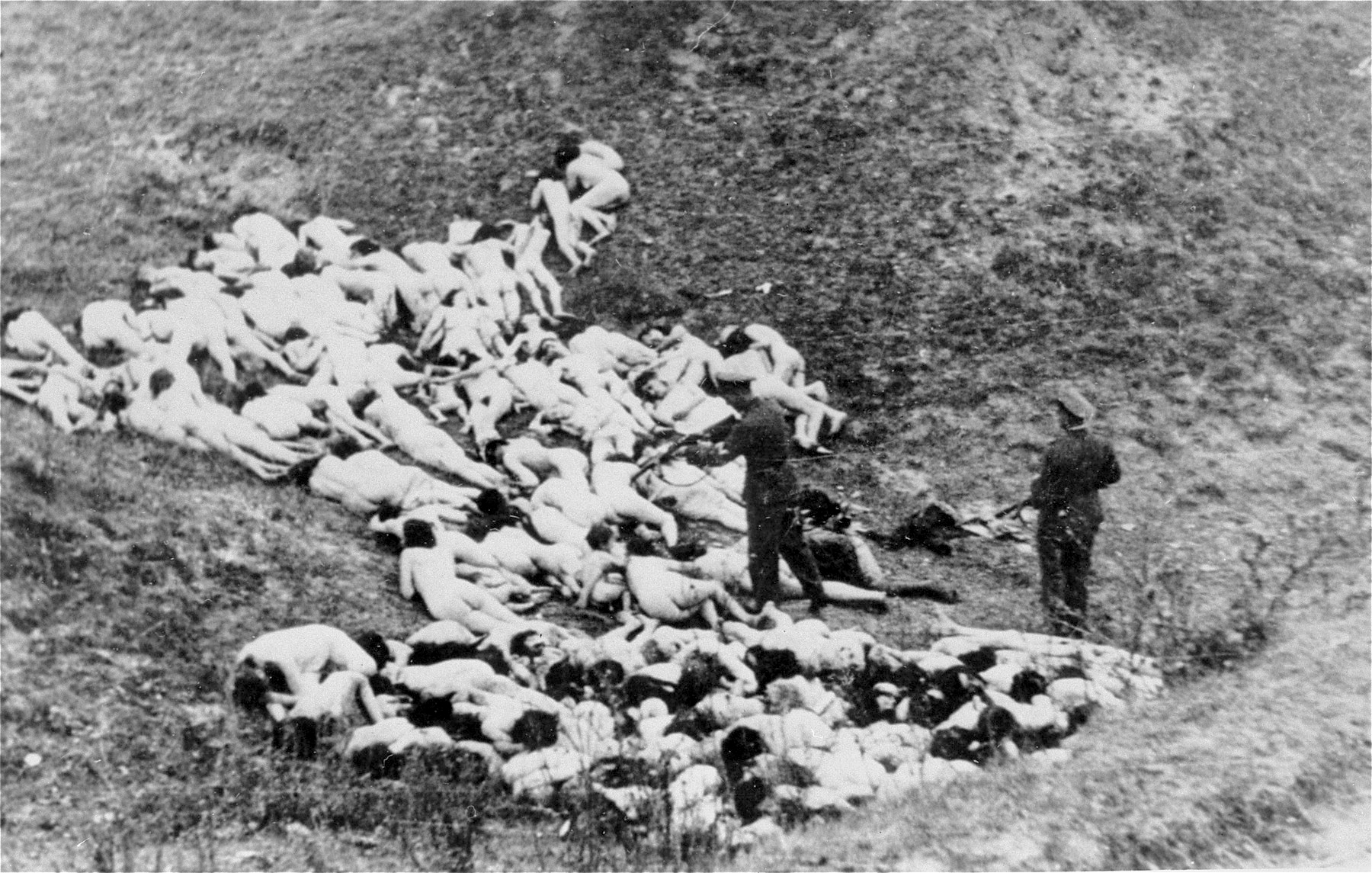
Members of the Ordnungspolizei shooting naked women and children during the Holocaust

The Order Police battalions, operating both independently and in conjunction with the Einsatzgruppen, became an integral part of the Final Solution in the two years following the attack on the Soviet Union on 22 June 1941, Operation Barbarossa. The first mass-murder of 3,000 Jews by Police Battalion 309 occurred in occupied Białystok on 12 July 1941. Police battalions were part of the first and second wave of murders in 1941 and into 1942 throughout the territories of Poland annexed by the Soviet Union and also earlier, during the killing operations within the 1939 borders of the USSR—whether as part of Order Police regiments, or as separate units reporting directly to local SS and Police Leaders. Over 11,000 members of the Order Police entered the Soviet Union in the wake of the Nazi invasion. They included the Reserve Police Battalion 101 from Hamburg, Battalion 133 of the Nürnberg Order Police, Police Battalions 45, 309 from Köln, 91 and 316 from Bottrop-Oberhausen. These units—among others—carried out extensive murder operations across the Eastern Front. In the immediate aftermath of World War II, this latter role was obscured both by the lack of court evidence and by deliberate obfuscation, while most of the focus was on the better-known Einsatzgruppen ("Operational groups") who reported to the Reich Security Main Office (RSHA) under Reinhard Heydrich.

Order Police battalions involved in direct killing operations were responsible for at least 1 million murders. Starting in 1941, the regional Order Police units helped to transport Jews from ghettos in both Poland and the USSR (and elsewhere in occupied Europe) to concentration and extermination camps; they also participated in operations to hunt down and murder Jews outside the ghettos. The Order Police and the Waffen-SS were the two primary sources from which the Einsatzgruppen drew personnel.

=== Murder of Soviet POWs ===
Order Police units also participated in the murder of Soviet POWs. In September 1941, the 2nd Company of Police Battalion 306, acting on the orders of SS and Police Leader Odilo Globocnik in the Lublin District, shot at least 6,000 Soviet POWs between 21 and 28 September at the overcrowded Stalag 359B at Kaliłów, near Biała Podlaska—3,261 of them on the first day alone. The operation, internally codenamed "Chicken Farm," was justified on the grounds that the food situation for Soviet prisoners was "causing some problems" and that it was no longer possible to feed the majority of the inmates, who once murdered, were referred to as "laid eggs." More broadly, shootings of prisoners in POW camps were carried out by both the Security Police and the Order Police alongside Wehrmacht camp guards, illustrating how certain victim groups fell simultaneously within multiple Nazi programmes of mass killing.

=== Anti-partisan operations ===
Another area that Order Police units participated in were the large-scale Großunternehmen ("large operations") anti-partisan campaigns that served as cover for the massacre of civilian populations in Belarus and beyond. In Operation Bamberg—conducted south of Bobruisk between 26 March and 6 April 1942—Police Battalion 315 participated alongside the reinforced 707th Infantry Division and the 102nd Slovak Infantry Regiment. In the village of Khvoinya alone, Police Battalion 315 murdered 1,350 people accused of being partisans or sympathizers to them, some of whom were locked inside their homes and killed with hand grenades or burned alive. The final report of the combined operation recorded 3,423 killed—the actual figure lay between 5,000 and 6,000—at a cost of seven German dead, while only 47 rifles and sub-machine guns were captured, a disproportion that exposed the operation's character as a campaign against civilians rather than actual armed combatants.

=== Brest Ghetto liquidation ===
On 15–16 October 1942, Police Battalion 310, Reserve Police Company "Nuremberg," the local Security Police, and Polish auxiliary forces surrounded the Brest Ghetto. Those unable to withstand transport were shot on site; the remainder—at least 15,000—were dispatched by freight train to a forest near Bronnaya Gora and murdered. Subsequent sweeps of the ghetto claimed hundreds more, with the total Jewish dead reaching approximately 19,000 victims.

=== Decrypts by British intelligence ===
While the activities of the Police Regiments, the Einsatzgruppen detachment, and the SS Brigades progressed in the summer and autumn of 1941, the reports by the murder squads were being intercepted and decoded by MI6, the British intelligence service. As part of Ultra, a British signals intelligence program, the codebreaking facilities at Bletchley Park decoded and analysed the messages. The MI6 communicated the decrypts directly to the British Prime Minister Winston Churchill. The first message decrypted was the 18 July report on the mass murders by Police Regiment Centre of over 1,100 Jews at Slonim, in the Army Group Centre Rear Area.

In late July and early August, similar reports were intercepted on a regular basis providing a comprehensive overview of German security operations in the Army Group Centre and the Army Group South rear areas. The first messages mentioning the murders by Police Regiment South were intercepted on August 23, with Police Battalion 314 reporting executions of 367 Jews south-east of Kiev. Apparently angered by the scope of the atrocities, Churchill delivered a speech over the radio on August 24, where he stated: "Whole districts are being exterminated... Since the Mongol invasion of Europe, there have never been methodical, merciless butchery on such a scale or approaching such a scale. We are in the presence of a crime without a name." On 12 September, the Order Police changed their cipher; the following day, SS officials were instructed to stop transmitting their reports over the radio.

For reasons of national security, the Ultra program remained classified after the war and the decrypts pertaining to the activities of security and police troops during the war were not shared with Britain's allies. Consequently, they were not used during the Nuremberg trials or subsequent investigations of German war crimes and crimes against humanity. The decrypts were finally released in 1993.

== Police personnel in the Wehrmacht and the Waffen-SS ==
The militarization of the police during the war was reflected in the restructuring of police units, with companies replacing traditional formations. In October 1939, a Police Division of 15,800 militarily trained personnel was formed, initially part of the police but made available to the Wehrmacht, participating in the 1940 Western Campaign and later restructured as the SS Polizei Division officially integrated into the Waffen-SS in 1942. (Note: Additional ideological training was introduced within the division, and approximately 8,000 members of the Orpo's Field Gendarmerie were assigned to the Wehrmacht as military police.) Many members of the Ordnungspolizei, along with other reservists and men from the Allgemeine SS were organised into the SS Totenkopfdivision.

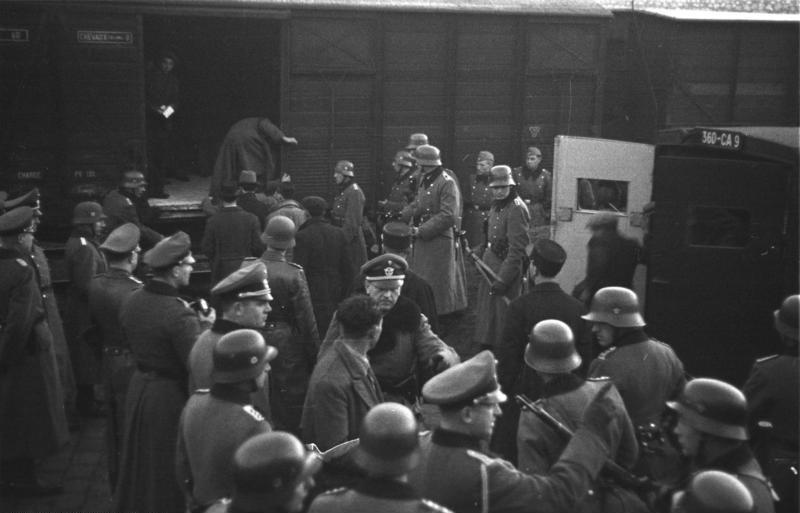
Troops from the SS Police Battalions load Jews into boxcars at Marseille, France, in January 1943.

In 1940, the SS Polizei Division was stationed along the Maginot Line to provide passive defense and in preparation for the Nazi invasion of France. Eventually the SS Polizei Division was called into offensive action, when on 9 June and 10 June, the 1st and 2nd Police Regiments participated in the assault across the Aisne River and the Ardennes Canal where they faced fierce French resistance before the 2nd Police Regiment broke through and took the town of Voncq. The unit was then ordered to advance through the Argonne Forest and again, despite fierce French fighting, managed to capture Les Islettes. Nonetheless, the SS Polizei Division was taken out of front-line fighting and placed in reserve near Bar le Duc, but not before they had suffered some 704 casualties in two engagements.

Throughout the course of the war, Himmler established as many as thirty SS-Police regiments for regions occupied by German forces. These units were created to carry out "special tasks" behind the Russian front, and each SS-Police regiment was assigned two armored car and antitank platoons with this "police army" subordinated to HSSPF leaders under Himmler's authority. Between 5,500 and 6,000 additional members of the Order Police were dispatched across central and southern Russia, accompanied by the SS-Einsatzgruppen. During periods of intense fighting and crisis, these SS-Police units were thrown into the front lines, but normally were used for anti-partisan activities or the mass execution of political prisoners and Jews.

During the spring of 1944—after a disastrous year on the Russian front—the 4th SS-Polizei Division fought Greek guerrilla forces near Klissura, after which, the division carried out "savage reprisals against the local inhabitants." The same thing happened at Distomo near Delphi, where members of this division slaughtered men, women, and children alike. Days after the massacre at Distomo, a Red Cross team from Athens "found bodies dangling from the trees that lined the road into the village."

Nearly 15 percent of all Waffen-SS general officers and colonels, as well as another 11 percent of its lieutenant-colonels and majors, began their careers as policemen.

== Aftermath ==
The Order Police as a whole was not declared a criminal organisation by the Allies, unlike the SS, and its members were able to reintegrate into society largely unmolested, with many returning to police careers in Austria and West Germany. That the Allies possessed, and disregarded, contemporaneous evidence of the organisation's character only sharpens the point: British intelligence had already assessed the police battalions during the war as "among the most nazified, fanatical and brutal German field units"—an appraisal that left no discernible trace on the postwar decision not to classify the Order Police as criminal. However, several high-ranking commanders were tried for crimes against humanity and executed, such as Kurt Daluege, the former Deputy Protector of Bohemia and Moravia who directed German reprisal actions, including the Lidice massacre. At the end of the war, he was arrested and extradited to Czechoslovakia, where he was tried and convicted of war crimes, sentenced to death, and executed by hanging in October 1946.

Eberhard Herf, commander of Police Regiment North and later commander of the Order Police in occupied Minsk, was taken prisoner by the Soviet Army forces. In 1945–1946, he was tried before a Soviet military tribunal in Minsk. The court heard the case against 18 German military, SS, and police officials accused of crimes committed during the occupation of Belarus. Alongside two Wehrmacht generals, Herf was the highest-ranking official of the occupying force on trial. Herf, along with 14 other defendants, was sentenced to death and executed by hanging on 30 January 1946.

That disparity—a handful of executed commanders set against a rank and file who went largely untried—was not simply a failure of prosecutorial will but a structural feature of West German postwar jurisprudence; namely, since domestic law required proof of a personal "base motive," such as racial hatred, before a killing could be charged as murder rather than as mere accessory to homicide, so that convictions remained rare and sentences comparatively light even where participation itself was never in doubt. The testimony gathered during the 1960s investigation of Police Battalion 322 illustrates precisely why that evidentiary threshold proved so difficult to meet: one battalion member stated that "the expression 'combat of the partisans' is strictly speaking a complete misnomer—we did not have a single battle with partisans after we left Mogilev," and that "those found without identity cards sufficed for their arrest and executions"—language that documents participation unambiguously while obscuring exactly the personal racial animus that West German law required to sustain a murder conviction. Investigation of the police battalions did not begin in earnest until 1958, when the founding of the Zentrale Stelle der Landesjustizverwaltungen (Central Agency for the State Administrations of Justice) in Ludwigsburg gave the referral of Nazi-era crime complexes to local prosecutors an institutional home. The case of Reserve Police Battalion 101 illustrates both the possibility and the limit of that effort; 210 former members were interrogated between 1962 and 1967 and fourteen were eventually indicted, "a rare success" by contemporary standards—yet even here, two of the convicted men had their sentences upheld on appeal in 1972 only to be left without any sentence at all, under a provision of the pre-existing 1940 criminal code invoked to avoid the criticism that had been "leveled at the Nürnberg trials" for applying the law retroactively.

Nuremberg, in this sense, was only the opening move; the legal reckoning with the crimes of Ordnungspolizei members ran on as one strand within a far longer and more scattered process—national prosecutions, extradition proceedings, hearings such as Israel's 1961 trial of Adolf Eichmann—that continued across jurisdictions for decades after the war itself had ended.

== See also ==
- Executions in Warsaw's police district
- Glossary of Nazi Germany
- Police Long Service Award
- Police forces of Nazi Germany
- Ranks and insignia of the Ordnungspolizei
- Schutzmannschaft, auxiliary policemen raised from local populations in occupied Eastern Europe during World War II

== Bibliography ==
- Bergen, Doris L. (2016). War and Genocide: A Concise History of the Holocaust (3rd ed.). Lanham, MD: Rowman & Littlefield. ISBN 978-1-4422-4227-2.
- Blood, Philip W. (2006). Hitler's Bandit Hunters: The SS and the Nazi Occupation of Europe. Potomac Books. ISBN 978-1-59797-021-1.
- Bracher, Karl-Dietrich (1970). The German Dictatorship: The Origins, Structure, and Effects of National Socialism. New York: Praeger Publishers. ASIN B001JZ4T16.
- Browning, Christopher R. (2000). Nazi Policy, Jewish Workers, German Killers. Cambridge and New York: Cambridge University Press. ISBN 978-0-52177-299-0.
- Browning, Christopher R. (2001) [1992]. Ordinary Men: Reserve Police Battalion 101 and the Final Solution in Poland. New York: Penguin Books. ISBN 978-0-14100-042-8.
- Buchheim, Hans (1968). "The SS: Instrument of Domination". In Krausnick, Helmut; Buchheim, Hans; Broszat, Martin; Jacobsen, Hans-Adolf (eds.). Anatomy of the SS State. New York: Walker and Company. pp. 127–301. ISBN 978-0-00211-026-6.
- Cesarani, David (2016). Final Solution: The Fate of the Jews, 1933–1945. New York: St. Martin's Press. ISBN 978-1-25000-083-5.
- EHRI – Bundesarchiv, Berlin-Lichterfelde. "EHRI – Hauptamt Ordnungspolizei".
- Gellately, Robert (1992). The Gestapo and German Society: Enforcing Racial Policy, 1933–1945. Oxford and New York: Oxford University Press. ISBN 978-0-19820-297-4.
- Goldhagen, Daniel (1997). Hitler's Willing Executioners: Ordinary Germans and the Holocaust. New York: Vintage. ISBN 0679772685.
- Harten, Hans-Christian (2018). Die weltanschauliche Schulung der Polizei im Nationalsozialismus (in German). Paderborn: Ferdinand Schöningh. ISBN 978-3-50678-836-8.
- Heer, Hannes (1995). "Der Minsker Prozess". Hannesheer.de.
- Heer, Hannes (2004). "The Logic of the War of Extermination". In Hannes Heer; Klaus Naumann (eds.). War of Extermination: The German Military In World War II. Berghahn Books. ISBN 1-57181-232-6.
- Hilberg, Raul (1985). The Destruction of the European Jews. New York: Holmes & Meier. ISBN 0-8419-0910-5.
- Kay, Alex J. (2021). Empire of Destruction: A History of Nazi Mass Killing. New Haven and London: Yale University Press. ISBN 978-0-300-26253-7.
- Krausnick, Helmut (1968). "The Persecution of the Jews". In Krausnick, Helmut; Buchheim, Hans; Broszat, Martin; Jacobsen, Hans-Adolf (eds.). Anatomy of the SS State. New York: Walker and Company. pp. 3–124. ISBN 978-0-00211-026-6.
- Langerbein, Helmut (2003). Hitler's Death Squads: The Logic of Mass Murder. College Station, TX: Texas A&M University Press. ISBN 978-1-58544-285-0.
- Longerich, Peter (2012). Heinrich Himmler: A Life. Oxford and New York: Oxford University Press. ISBN 978-0-19959-232-6.
- Matthäus, Jürgen (2008). Patricia Heberer; Jürgen Matthäus (eds.). Atrocities on Trial: Historical Perspectives on the Politics of Prosecuting War Crimes. Washington, D.C.: University of Nebraska Press. ISBN 978-0-8032-1084-4.
- McKale, Donald M (2011). Nazis after Hitler: How Perpetrators of the Holocaust Cheated Justice and Truth. Lanham, MD: Rowman & Littlefield. ISBN 978-1-4422-1316-6.
- MIRS (1945). "The German Police". London Branch, and Allied Forces Supreme Headquarters Evaluation and Dissemination Section. London: Supreme Headquarters, Allied Expeditionary Force, Evaluation and Dissemination Section, G-2, Counter Intelligence Sub-Division. OCLC 12969317.
- Müller-Hillebrand, Burkhart (1969). Der Zweifrontenkrieg: Das Heer vom Beginn des Feldzuges gegen die Sowjetunion bis zum Kriegsende. Das Heer (1933–1945). Vol. 3. Frankfurt am Main: Mittler. OCLC 83882908.
- Rees, Laurence (2017). The Holocaust: A New History. New York: PublicAffairs. ISBN 978-1-61039-844-2.
- Robertson, Struan (2008). "Hamburg Police Battalions during the Second World War". University of Hamburg (via Wayback Machine). Archived from the original (Internet Archive) on 22 February 2008.
- Rossino, Alexander B. (2003). Hitler Strikes Poland: Blitzkrieg, Ideology, and Atrocity. Lawrence, KS: University of Kansas Press. ISBN 978-0-70061-234-5.
- Showalter, Dennis (2005). "Foreword". Hitler's Police Battalions: Enforcing Racial War in the East. Kansas City: University Press of Kansas. ISBN 978-0-7006-1724-1.
- Smith, Michael (2004). "Bletchley Park and the Holocaust". In Scott, L. V. & Jackson, P. D. (eds.). Understanding Intelligence in the Twenty-First Century: Journeys in Shadows. london. ISBN 0714655333.
- Snyder, Louis (1994) [1976]. Encyclopedia of the Third Reich. Da Capo Press. ISBN 978-1-56924-917-8.
- Stackelberg, Roderick (2007). The Routledge Companion to Nazi Germany. New York: Routledge. ISBN 978-0-415-30861-8.
- Stein, George (1984) [1966]. The Waffen-SS: Hitler's Elite Guard at War 1939–1945. Cornell University Press. ISBN 0-8014-9275-0.
- USHMM. "The Nazification of the German Police, 1933–1939". United States Holocaust Memorial Museum | Holocaust Encyclopedia.
- USHMM. "The Order Police". United States Holocaust Memorial Museum | Holocaust Encyclopedia.
- U.S. War Dept. (1995) [March 1945]. David I. Norwood (ed.). Handbook on German Military Forces. Baton Rouge: Louisiana State University Press. ISBN 0-8071-2011-1.
- Weale, Adrian (2012). Army of Evil: A History of the SS. New York; Toronto: NAL Caliber (Penguin Group). ISBN 978-0-451-23791-0.
- Westermann, Edward B. (2005). Hitler's Police Battalions: Enforcing Racial War in the East. Kansas City: University Press of Kansas. ISBN 978-0-7006-1724-1.
- Westermann, Edward B. (2006). "Ideology and Organizational Culture: Creating the Police Soldier". In Dagmar Herzog (ed.). Lessons and Legacies VII: The Holocaust in International Perspective. Evanston, IL: Northwestern University Press. pp. 129–141. ISBN 0-8101-2370-3.
- Zentner, Christian; Bedürftig, Friedemann (1991). The Encyclopedia of the Third Reich. New York: MacMillan Publishing. ISBN 0-02-897500-6.
