= Sepp Ritter =

Liechtenstein Nazi politician (1912–1989)

Leader of the German National Movement in Liechtenstein
- In office March 1943 – May 1945
- Preceded by: Alfons Goop
- Succeeded by: Position abolished

Personal details
- Born: 29 January 1912 Mauren, Liechtenstein
- Died: 19 January 1989 (aged 76) Schaan, Liechtenstein
- Party: German National Movement in Liechtenstein
- Spouse: Alma von Grebmer (m. 1938)
- Children: 5

Sepp Ritter (29 January 1912 – 19 January 1989) was a veterinarian and politician from Liechtenstein. He was the leader of the German National Movement in Liechtenstein from 1943 to 1945, a Nazi Party that aimed to unify with Nazi Germany.

== Life ==
Ritter was born on 29 January 1912 in Mauren as the son of Eduard Ritter and Kathona (née Biedermann). He studied veterinary medicine in Vienna, where he received a doctorate in 1937.

In 1937 Ritter opened a veterinary clinic in Schaan. Following from 1940 he was a leading figure of the German National Movement in Liechtenstein and was the head of the party's sports department until 1942. Following Alfons Goop's resignation in 1943, Sepp was the leader of the party until its disestablishment in May 1945. He was also a contributor to the party's newspaper, Der Umbruch.

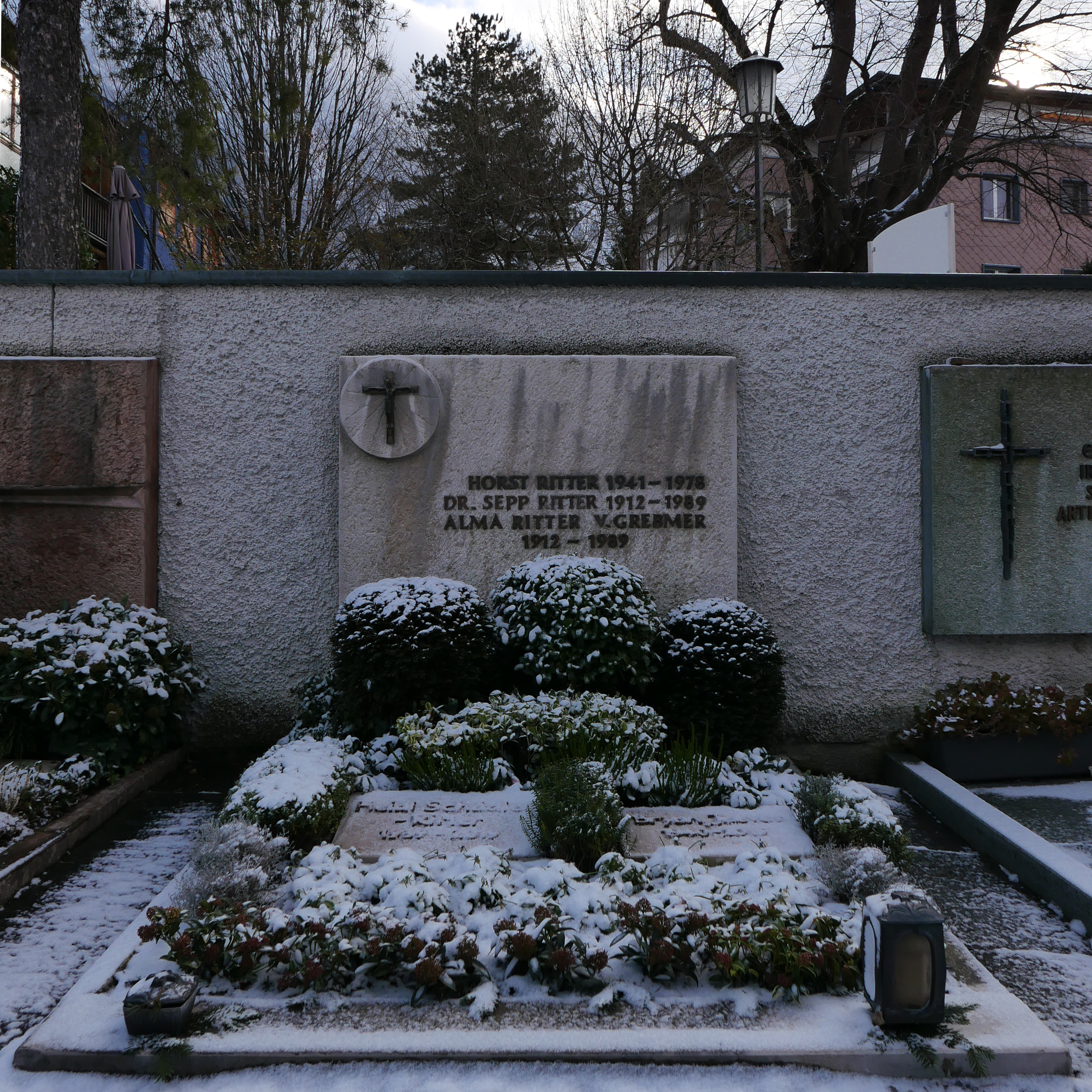
Ritter's grave in 2024.

Ritter married Alma von Grebmer in 1938 and they had five children together. He died on 19 January 1989 in Schaan, aged 76. He is buried in the town's cemetery.
