= Liechtenstein Loyalty Association =

Defunct nonpartisan organisation in Liechtenstein

- Heimattreue Vereinigung Liechtenstein
- Abbreviation: HVL
- Founded: 24 January 1939; 87 years ago
- Founder: Emanuel Konrad
- Dissolved: 1945; 81 years ago
- Purpose: Nonpartisan anti-fascism
- Headquarters: Schaan, Liechtenstein
- Location: Liechtenstein
- Leader: Emanuel Konrad (January 1939–March 1939); Alois Schädler (March 1939–July 1940); Richard Meier (July 1940–1945)

The Liechtenstein Loyalty Association (German: Heimattreue Vereinigung Liechtenstein, HVL) was a nonpartisan organisation designed to oppose the German National Movement in Liechtenstein (VBDL) and preserve Liechtenstein's independence during World War II.

== History ==
The association was formed on 24 January 1939 by a contingent of 21 men under the leadership of entrepreneur Emanuel Konrad who founded an organizing committee designed to counteract National socialist activities in Liechtenstein, particularly that of the German National Movement in Liechtenstein (VBDL).

After the VBDL attempted a coup on 24 March 1939, the association launched a signature campaign, organized by Hans Gassner, to reaffirm Liechtenstein's independence in addition to a commitment to Franz Joseph II and the country's continued economic and political alignment towards Switzerland. The campaign received 2492 signatures, representing 95% of the country's eligible voters.

From July 1940, it was led by Richard Meier and formed the Liechtenstein Homeland Loyalty Association in reaction to the VBDL reforming under the leadership of Alfons Goop, which showed itself to be vigilant in counteracting their operations.

The organisation was quietly disbanded in 1945 after threat from Nazi Germany came to an end and the VBDL disbanded.
