= 1939 Liechtenstein putsch =

Failed coup attempt

Date	24 March 1939
Location	Schaan, Liechtenstein 47°10′43″N 9°31′20″E
Result	Coup failed: German invasion failed to materialize; VDBL leadership arrested or fled

Belligerents
German National Movement in Liechtenstein; Supported by: Nazi Germany (unofficial)	Progressive Citizens' Party; Patriotic Union; Liechtenstein Loyalty Association; House of Liechtenstein

Commanders and leaders
Theodor Schädler	Franz Josef II; Josef Hoop; Third Josef Hoop cabinet; Anton Frommelt

Strength
40 or more	Unknown

The 1939 Liechtenstein putsch, also known as the Annexation putsch (German: Anschlussputsch) was an unsuccessful coup d'état by the German National Movement in Liechtenstein (Volksdeutsche Bewegung in Liechtenstein or VDBL) on 24 March 1939 designed to provoke Liechtenstein's annexation by Nazi Germany.

The plan was for members of the VDBL to march on Vaduz and attempt to seize control of the government, which was hoped would cause clashes between them and the government. 600 German troops from Feldkirch would then move into Liechtenstein in response to a call for help and incorporate the country into Germany. The plan failed as the VDBL was stopped by opponents and most members were arrested or fled. Following World War II, several people were charged for their actions during the coup, of which seven were convicted.

== Background ==
=== Formation of a Liechtenstein Nazi party ===
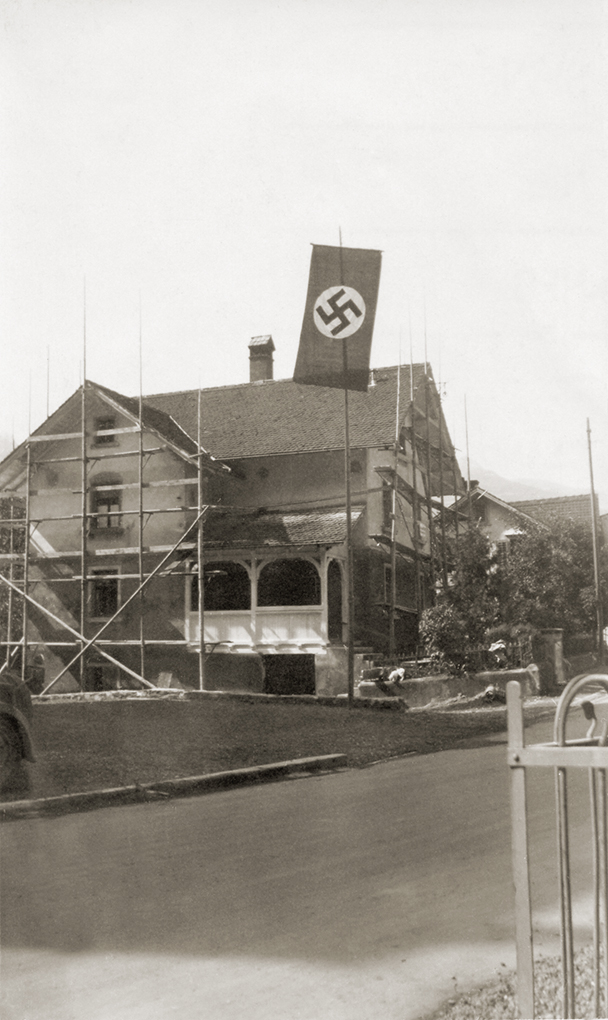
A Nazi swastika being hoisted in Vaduz, around 1938.

Nazi groups had existed in Liechtenstein since 1933, primarily due to the rise of Nazi Germany and the introduction of anti-Jewish laws in Germany, which caused Liechtenstein to experience a large Jewish immigration. As a result, there was continuing antisemitic agitation in Liechtenstein throughout the 1930s. Most notably, the Rotter kidnapping was designed to be an impetus for the formation of an organized Nazi group in Liechtenstein, but it instead weakened such efforts for a time.

The 1938 Anschluss of Austria provided an impetus for the formation of the German National Movement in Liechtenstein (VDBL). In line with the Anschluss, the VDBL advocated the integration of Liechtenstein into Nazi Germany, and was associated with the slogan, Liechtenstein den Liechtensteinern! (Liechtenstein for the Liechtensteiners!), which conveyed a sense of racial right-wing populism in opposition to Franz Josef II, the ruling prince of Liechtenstein. Its membership included many members of the former Liechtenstein Homeland Service, which had merged with the Patriotic Union in January 1936.

Shortly after the Anschluss of Austria, the Volksdeutsche Mittelstelle, in connection with the VDBL planned for the VDBL to be democratically elected into power via funding from Germany, then it would end the customs union with Switzerland and align towards Germany, leading to an eventual annexation of Liechtenstein into Germany. The plans were reportedly supported by Joseph Goebbels. They were personally blocked by Adolf Hitler on 18 March 1938 as he did not want to complicate relations with Switzerland.

=== Politics prior to the coup ===
It has been speculated that Franz I had given the regency to Franz Joseph on 31 March 1938 as he did not wish to remain in control of the principality if Nazi Germany were to invade, primarily because his wife Princess Elsa of Liechtenstein was of Jewish origin. The previous day, the governing Progressive Citizens' Party and opposition Patriotic Union formed a coalition, which was designed to avoid political deadlock while there was an ongoing threat from Nazi Germany. Proportional representation was unanimously introduced to Liechtenstein on 18 January 1939, as was a point of compromise between the two parties. On 11 March of the same year, Franz Joseph, in agreement with both parties, disbanded the Landtag and called for early elections.

The election was intended to be used only as a means to distribute a roughly equal number of seats in the Landtag between the two parties; as such, it became known as the "silent election" as no actual voting took place. This was allowed due to article thirty of the new proportional representation law, which states that "If one or more parties, representing at least 80% of the votes cast in the previous legislative elections, form a joint list of candidates, these, excluding the other candidates proposed by other parties, are declared elected, if fewer than 400 persons registered on the electoral lists do not object in writing within 14 days." The clause was enacted due to both parties’ desire to not hold an election campaign period that would jeopardize the recently formed coalition government and allow for the VDBL to be able to gain support. This scheduled election is believed to be the primary motivation for the coup, as many in the VDBL saw it as a last hope to gaining power within the country.

== Preparation and coup ==
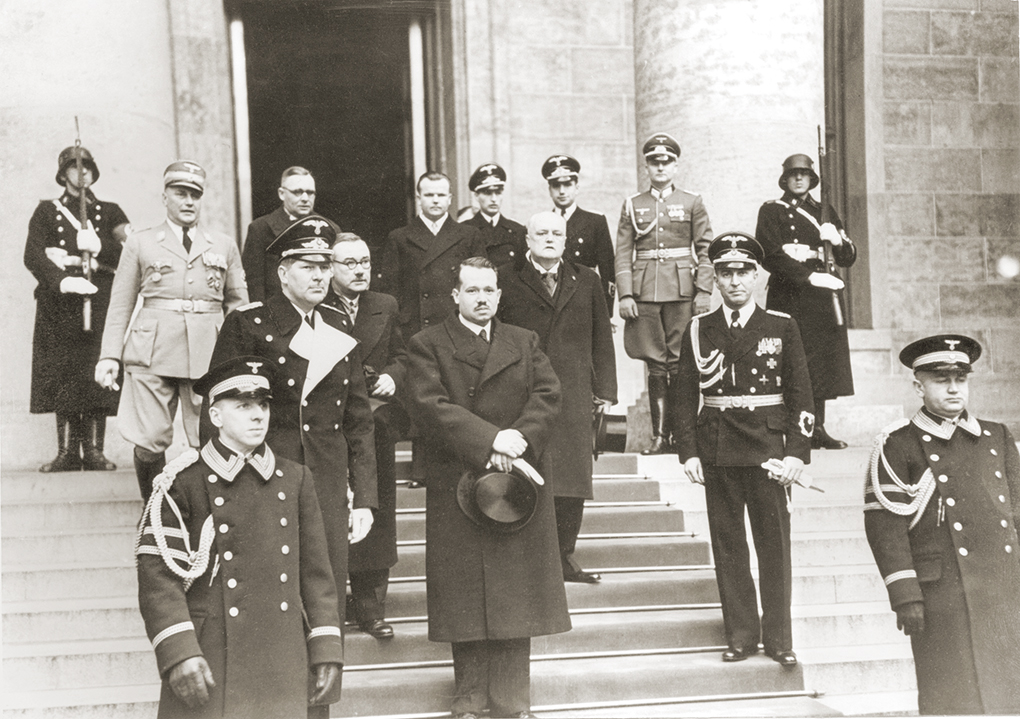
Franz Josef II (centre) with members of the German and Liechtenstein government outside the Reich Chancellery in Berlin, 2 March 1939.

The plan was drawn up by Nazi authorities in Feldkirch and the leader of the VDBL Theodor Schädler, although not backed by the German government itself. The plan was for members of the VDBL to march on Vaduz and seize control of the government, which it was hoped would cause clashes between them and the government. German troops from Feldkirch would then move into Liechtenstein in response to a call for help and incorporate the country into Germany. It has also been speculated that the Volksdeutsche Mittelstelle was involved in the coup. It was originally planned for 22 March 1939, in the same month of a visit by Franz Joseph II and Josef Hoop to Berlin where they met Hitler and Joachim von Ribbentrop, but it was delayed until the 24th. This is accredited with removing the element of surprise from the preparations, as reportedly employees of the Deutsche Reichsbahn informed Swiss authorities of 600 German troops amassing in Feldkirch.

In the late evening of 24 March, approximately 40 members of the VDBL marched from Nendeln towards Vaduz. In front of Schaan, opponents had gathered to stop them and the VDBL were convinced to turn back by government councillor Anton Frommelt who also blocked their telephone lines, in addition to aid from Ferdinand Risch. Some VDBL members subsequently gathered outside of Schaan under the leadership of Theodor Schädler, but many others were prevented from leaving their homes by opponents. Further coup participants were supposed to close the Triesen-Balzers road and the Vaduz-Sevelen Rhine bridge in the wake of the German invasion, albeit the invasion did not happen as it was blocked on Hitler's orders following intervention by Alois Vogt. Instead, VDBL members resorted to burning swastikas in order to provoke an intervention from Nazi Germany.

Vogt later met Schädler, where he explained that the German invasion would not happen, and that he would allow the Swiss border police to open fire on the VDBL demonstrators should they not stand down. Realizing that the coup was a failure, many of the coup's participants were arrested or fled. However, many were prevented by border guards in both Switzerland and Nazi Germany once they gained news of the attempted coup.

== Aftermath ==
After the coup's failure, 36 out of the over 100 participants fled to Feldkirch, and another 76 people were arrested and questioned, with about 50 of them being charged. However, out of fear of German intervention, they were all released in December 1939 on condition that they leave Liechtenstein. It is not known exactly why Hitler decided against intervening in the coup, although it has been speculated that he was not very interested in Liechtenstein and did not want to provoke a war with Switzerland.

During the attempted coup, a large majority of Jews living in Liechtenstein fled the country to Switzerland, though most returned in the days following its failure. The coup was unpopular with most people in Liechtenstein, and it generated a strong sense of patriotic unity. This caused the Liechtenstein Loyalty Association to heighten its operations against the VDBL and launch a petition to reaffirm Liechtenstein's independence, which received 2492 signatures.

The VDBL was effectively defunct after the coup until it was relaunched by Alfons Goop in 1940. After World War II, twelve coup participants were put on trial on charges of high treason, and seven were convicted in 1946. Alois Batliner, Franz Beck, and Josef Frick were each sentenced to five years in prison, while Egon Marxer and Goop were sentenced to 2.5 years, and Alois Kindle, Hermann Marxer, and Josef Gassner each received suspended two-month sentences. During the war, Batliner had served in the Schutzpolizei, while Marxer and Goop had served in the Waffen-SS on the Eastern Front.

== See also ==
- Rotter kidnapping
- German National Movement in Liechtenstein
- Liechtenstein in World War II
- History of Liechtenstein
