= Administrative police in Nazi Germany =

Polizeiadler

The Administrative Police in Nazi Germany (German: Verwaltungspolizei), was not only responsible for the internal administration of the police services, but also for many administrative functions which in other countries were performed by purely civilian agencies.

== State police departments ==
The police commissioners of the state police departments in cities were police lawyers of the administrative police with the grades of Polizeidirektor or Polizeipräsident. The staff of the administrative police consisted of police lawyers, police administrative officials, as well as the jailers of the police jails.

Mission

The administrative police of the state police departments handled the following type of matters:

- Financial administration of the state police department.
- Passports, control of aliens, civil registration (including the Nuremberg Laws), registration of conscripts.
- Traffic regulations, waterways and fire inspection.
- Control of trade establishments and their licences.
- Regulations on punishable offences, welfare matters, health inspection, food and veterinary inspection.

== Municipal police departments ==
The municipal police departments handled the same type of business as the state police departments. In addition in handled the type of police duties that was reserved for the municipal authorities, such as building inspection, forest police, housing inspection, homelessness, and school attendance. Only the larger cities without a state police department had a special staff of Gemeindeverwaltungspolizeibeamten, municipal administrative police officials. In smaller cities and in towns the administrative police functions were handled by the regular civil municipal administration.

== Personnel ==
Administrative police officials belonged to the same four different career tracks as the general civil service.

=== Career tracks and recruitment ===
Career track	Civilian education required for candidates from civil life	Recruitment of administrative officials serving in State Police Departments and as Municipal administrative police officials	Recruitment of administrative officials serving in the Gestapo/Sicherheitspolizei
einfacher Dienst (lower career)	Volksschule	100% from State Protection Police officers (Municipal protection police officers)	80 % from State Protection Police officers with more than 8 years seníority; 20% from civil life as Polizeverwaltungslehrlinge (police administration apprentices).
mittlerer Dienst (middle career)	Vocational school	90% from State Protection Police officers (Municipal police officers) with more than 10 years seníority; 10% from civilian life.	50% from State Protection Police officers with more than 8 years seníority; 50% from civil life.
gehobener Dienst (upper career)	Abitur	50% from State Protection Police officers (Municipal protection police officers) with at least 12 years seníority; 50% from civil life.	50% from State Protection Police officers with at least 12 years seníority; 50% from civil life. Promotion from Middle Career also possible. All candidates had since 1939 to successfully participate in a SS-Fuehrer selection. Participation in the selection required membership in the Nazi Party.
höherer Dienst (higher career)	University degree	From civil life	

=== Grades and pay ===
Pay grade	Annual pay Reichsmark	Lower career	Middle career	Upper career	Higher career or Police lawyers	Insignia	Corresponding rank
A10b	1700–2400	Amtsgehilfe; Botenmeister; Hausmeister	–	–	–		Wachtmeister
A10a	1759–2550	Betriebsassistent; Oberbotenmeister	–	–	–		Revieroberwachtmeister
A9	1800–2700	Polizei- Gefängnisoberwachtmeister; Vollziehungsbeamter	–	–	–		Revieroberwachtmeister
A9	1800–2700	Polizei- Gefängnishauptwachtmeister; Erster Polizeigefängnis-hauptwachtmeister	–	–	–		Hauptwachtmeister
A8a	2100–2800	–	Polizeiassistent; Kanzleiassistent; Regierungsassistent; Verwaltungsassistent technischer Assistent	–	–		Hauptwachtmeister
A7a	2350–3500	Polizeigefängnis- Verwalter	Polizeisekretär; Kanzleisekretär; Regierungssekretär technischer Sekretär	–	–		Meister
A5b	2300–4200	Polizeigefängnis- Oberverwalter	Polizeiobersekretär; Kanzleiobersekretär; Regierungsobersekretär techn. Obersekretär; Waffenmeister	–	–		Obermeister; Revierleutnant
A4c2	2800–5000	–	–	Polizeiinspektor; Waffeninspektor; Waffenrevisor	–		Oberleutnant
A4c1	2 800–5300	–	–	Polizeinspektor; Polizeirentmeister	–		Oberleutnant
A4b2	3000–5500	–	–	Polizeioberinspektor; Polizeirechnungsrevisor	–		Hauptmann
A4b1	4100–5800	–	–	Polizeioberinspektor; Polizeioberrentmeister; Waffenoberrevisor; Oberbuchalter	–		Hauptmann
A3b	4800–7 000	–	–	Polizeirat; Polizeiamtmann (with less than 3 years in the grade)	–		Hauptmann
A3b	4800–7 000	–	–	Polizeirat; Polizeiamtmann	–		Major
A2d	4800–7800		–	Amtsrat; Polizeioberamtmann	–		Major
A2c2	4800–8400	–		–	Regierungsassessor		Hauptmann
A2c2	4800–8400	–	–	–	Regierungsrat (with less than 3 years in the grade)		Hauptmann
A2c2	4800–8400	–	–	Regierungs- und Kassenrat	Regierungsrat		Major
A2b	7 000–9700	–	–	–	Polizeidirektor (chief of police in cities with less than 100,000 inhabitants); Oberregierungsrat; Oberstleutnant der Polizei		Oberstleutnant
A1b	6200–10600	–	–	–	Polizeipräsident (chief of police in cities with more than 100,000 inhabitants); Regierungsdirektor		Oberst
A1a	8400–12600	–	–	–	Polizeipräsident (chief of police in cities with more than 200,000 inhabitants); Polizeivizepräsident (Berlin); Ministerialrat (Assistant Secretary in the Ministry of Interior); Oberst der Polizei		Oberst
B8	14000		–	–	Polizeipräsident (chief of police in cities with more than 500,000 inhabitants)		Generalmajor
B7b	15000	–	–	–	Polizeipräsident (chief of police in Hamburg)		Generalmajor
B7a	16000	–	–	–	Polizeipräsident (chief of police in Vienna); Ministrerialdirigent (Assistant Undersecretary in the Ministry of Interior)		Generalmajor
B6	17000	–	–	–	Polizeipräsident (chief of police in Berlin)		Generalleutnant
B4	19000	–	–	–	Ministerialdirektor (Undersecretary in the Ministry of Interior)		Generalleutnant

Median annual wage for an industrial worker was 1,495 RM in 1939. In the same year the median salary for a privately employed white-collar worker was 2,772 RM.

Promotions

New rules for promotions were issued in 1943.

Polizeiassistenten were eligible for promotion to Polizeisekretär after two years in the grade. Participation in a SS-Fuehrer course was mandatory for SS-members, but not for officials who didn't belong to the SS. Polizeisekretäre were eligible for promotion to Polizeiobersekretär after three years in the grade. Participation in a leadership course was mandatory for those not members of the SS.

Polizeiinspektoren were eligible for promotion to Polizeioberinspektor after three years in the grade. Polizeioberinspektoren were eligible for promotion to Polizeirat after two years in the grade. Regierungsamtmänner and Polizeiräte in RSHA were eligible for promotion to Amtsrat after five years in the grade. Amtsräte were eligible for promotion to Regierungsrat after five years in the grade.
