= Israel–Liechtenstein relations =

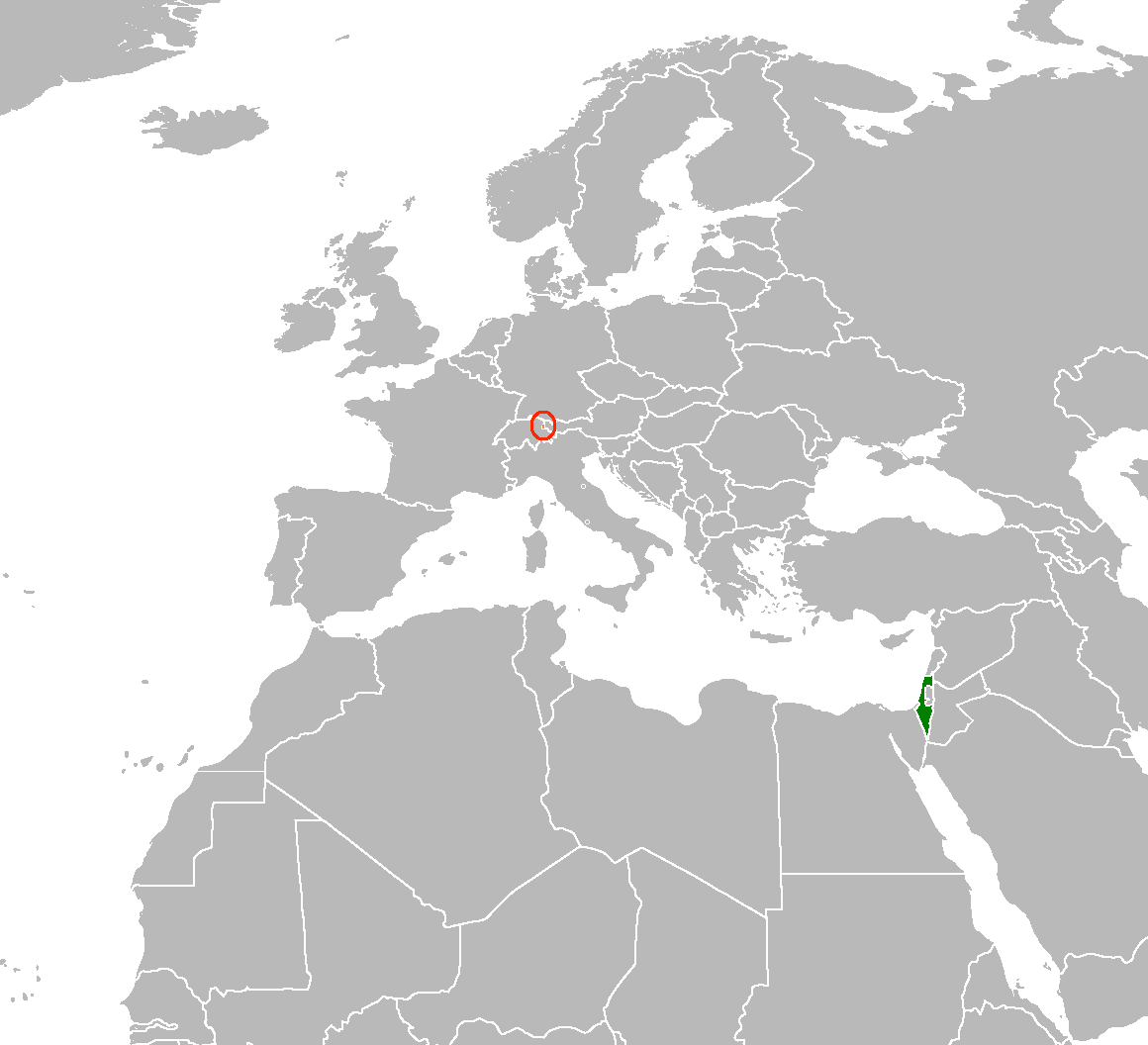

- Israel: Liechtenstein

Israel–Liechtenstein relations are foreign relations between Israel and Liechtenstein, established on 13 March 1992.

Liechtenstein doesn't have an embassy in Israel. Israel's ambassador to Switzerland serves also as a non-resident ambassador to Liechtenstein.

Since 1 June 1967 nationals of Israel and Liechtenstein don't need a visa to visit one another.

Israel and the European Free Trade Association, of which Liechtenstein is a member, have a free trade agreement since 1 January 1993.

== See also ==
- History of the Jews in Liechtenstein
- Foreign relations of Israel
- Foreign relations of Liechtenstein
