= Theodor Schädler =

Liechtenstein Nazi politician (1896–1975)

Leader of the German National Movement in Liechtenstein
- In office 1938 – 24 March 1939
- Preceded by: Rudolf Schädler
- Succeeded by: Alfons Goop

Personal details
- Born: 2 January 1896 Triesenberg, Liechtenstein
- Died: 23 December 1975 (aged 78) Bad Waldsee, West Germany
- Party: German National Movement in Liechtenstein
- Spouse: Amalia Deschelmayer (m. 1925)
- Children: 4

Theodor Schädler (2 January 1896 – 23 December 1975) was a politician from Liechtenstein. He was the leader of the German National Movement in Liechtenstein from 1938 to 1939, a Nazi party that aimed to unify with Nazi Germany.

== Early life and career ==
Schädler was born on 2 January 1896 in Triesenberg to the son of tailor Hieronymus Schädler and his mother Rosina Heeb as one of three children.

He obtained a diploma in electrical engineering, and from 1929 to 1939 he was operations manager of the Lawena power plant. He was suspended on 21 January 1939 due to his involvement in antisemitic agitation in Liechtenstein.

== Political career and coup attempt ==
After the Anschluss of Austria in 1938, Schädler was heavily involved in the establishment of the German National Movement in Liechtenstein (VDBL) and headed the party from 1938 to 1940.

In the late evening of 24 March 1939, during a visit to Berlin by Franz Joseph II and Josef Hoop the VBDL staged an amateurish coup attempt, first trying to provoke an intervention from Nazi Germany by burning swastikas, followed by declaring an Anschluß with Germany. Approximately 40 members of the VBDL starting from Nendeln marched towards Vaduz, but were turned back by Anton Frommelt, VBDL members subsequently gathered outside of Schaan under the leadership of Schädler, but many were prevented from leaving their homes from opponents. The leaders were almost immediately arrested and the hoped-for German invasion failed to materialise. Schädler was arrested along with many other coup participants, though out of fear of German intervention, he was released in December 1939 on the condition that he left Liechtenstein.

He fled to Nazi Germany after his release. The VBDL was effectively defunct after the coup until it was reformed by Alfons Goop in 1940 in which Schädler retained in contact with until 1945. After World War II ended in 1945, Schädler was put on trial for high treason and was sentenced to several years in prison in Liechtenstein, though he did not serve this sentence and remained in West Germany until his death on 23 December 1975 in Bad Waldsee, aged 78 years old.

== Personal life ==
Schädler married Amalia Deschelmayer (16 December 1896 – 31 December 1996) on 31 December 1925 and they had four children together.
