= German National Movement in Liechtenstein =

Far-right political party (1938–1945)

German National Movement in Liechtenstein Volksdeutsche Bewegung in Liechtenstein
- Abbreviation: VDBL
- Leader: Rudolf Schädler (1938); Theodor Schädler (1938–1940); Alfons Goop (1940–1943); Sepp Ritter (1943–1945)
- Founded: March 1938; 88 years ago
- Dissolved: May 1945; 81 years ago
- Newspaper: Der Umbruch
- Membership: 150–250
- Ideology: Nazism
- Political position: Far-right
- Slogan: Liechtenstein den Liechtensteinern! ("Liechtenstein for Liechtensteiners!")

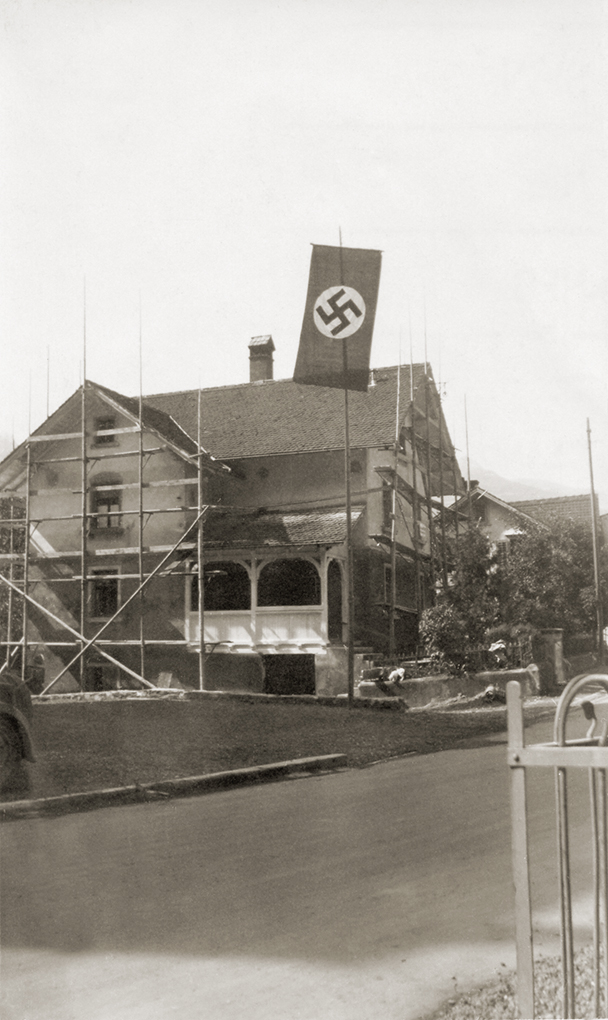
A Nazi swastika being hoisted in Vaduz, around 1938

The German National Movement in Liechtenstein (German: Volksdeutsche Bewegung in Liechtenstein, VDBL) was a Nazi party in Liechtenstein that existed between 1938 and 1945.

== Formation and ideology ==
Nazi groups had existed in Liechtenstein since 1933, primarily because of the rise of Nazi Germany and the introduction of German anti-Jewish laws, after which Liechtenstein experienced a large rise in Jewish immigrants. Most notably, German writers and composers Fritz and Alfred Rotter with a Jewish background were naturalized in Liechtenstein in 1931. Following German press and demands for their extradition, local Liechtenstein Nazis attempted to kidnap the two men and forcefully return them to Nazi Germany in the Rotter kidnapping. However, this scheme failed and as a result of a highly publicized trial it held back the formation of an organized Nazi party in Liechtenstein until 1938.

The VDBL itself formed after the Anschluss of Austria in March 1938 under the leadership of Rudolf Schädler, advocating for the integration of Liechtenstein into the Greater German Reich. The organization disseminated its ideology through its newspaper, Der Umbruch. It was then taken over by Theodor Schädler in the same year. A slogan associated with the party was Liechtenstein den Liechtensteinern! (Liechtenstein for the Liechtensteiners!). This implied a radical populism that would threaten the allegiance of the people of Liechtenstein to ruling Prince of Liechtenstein Franz Josef II. The party offered Patriotic Union leader Otto Schaedler leadership of the party primarily due to his contacts with Nazi Germany, but he refused and distanced himself from the party.

Shortly after the Anschluss of Austria, the Volksdeutsche Mittelstelle, in connection with the VBDL planned for the VBDL to be democratically elected into power via funding from Germany, then it would end the customs union with Switzerland and align towards Germany, leading to an eventual annexation of Liechtenstein into Germany. The plans were reportedly supported by Joseph Goebbels. However, it was personally blocked by Adolf Hitler himself on 18 March 1938 as he did not want to complicate relations with Switzerland.

== Coup attempt and party demise ==
In the wake of World War II, the governing Progressive Citizens' Party and opposition Patriotic Union formed a coalition, assigning a roughly equal number of seats each, in order to prevent the VDBL from acquiring any seats in the Landtag.

In March 1939, the VDBL staged an amateurish coup attempt, first trying to provoke a German intervention by burning swastikas, followed by declaring an Anschluss with Germany. The leaders were almost immediately arrested and the hoped-for German invasion failed to materialise. The party was effectively defunct from this point until 1940.

The Liechtenstein Loyalty Association was formed following the party's coup attempt in order to oppose Nazi activities in Liechtenstein, particularly that of the VDBL. The association launched a signature campaign to reaffirm Liechtenstein's independence in addition to a commitment to Franz Joseph II and the country's continued economic and political alignment towards Switzerland. This campaign was signed by 2492 people in Liechtenstein.

The inability of the party to participate in the 1939 elections (after a pact between the main parties to keep the election date a secret), combined with the drastic decrease in Nazi sympathies following the outbreak of World War II led to a temporary demise of the party. However, in June 1940 it was reconstituted under the leadership of Alfons Goop. During 1941 and 1942, the party was involved in vehement anti-Semitic agitation, urging a solution to the country's presumed "Jewish Question", accusing Jewish families in Liechtenstein of spying for the Allies. Until 1943, the party attempted to recruit Liechtensteiners into the Waffen-SS and gain public sympathy for the Nazi cause, which infuriated Switzerland.

The German Ministry of Foreign Affairs in March 1943 forced the VDBL to hold talks with the Patriotic Union (VU) in Friedrichshafen, under the auspices of the Waffen-SS, in order to reach a fusion of both parties, which shared an anti-Bolshevik and anti-clerical programme. Severely disappointed, Goop resigned as party leader and it was taken over by Sepp Ritter. In the end, the VU consented only to some "cultural cooperation". When Germany's war fortunes declined, in July 1943 Der Umbruch was forbidden by the authorities.

After World War II ended in 1945, twelve coup participants were put on trial on charges of high treason due to the 1939 coup attempt, of which seven were convicted in 1946. Alois Batliner, Franz Beck, and Josef Frick were each sentenced to five years in prison, while Egon Marxer was sentenced to 2.5 years in prison, and Alois Kindle, Hermann Marxer, and Josef Gassner each received suspended two-month sentences. During the war, Batliner had served in the Schutzpolizei, while Marxer had served in the Waffen-SS on the Eastern Front.
