= Der Umbruch =

Liechtenstein Nazi newspaper from 1940 to 1943

- Type: Bi-weekly newspaper
- Publisher: U. Goppel
- Editor: Martin Hilti
- Founded: 5 October 1940
- Ceased publication: 6 July 1943 (banned)
- Political alignment: German National Movement in Liechtenstein
- Language: German
- City: Vaduz
- Country: Liechtenstein
- Circulation: 300 (as of 1942)

Der Umbruch (lit. 'The Upheaval', sometimes referred to by its nickname Der Bruch) was a newspaper published in Vaduz, Liechtenstein. It was the organ of the German National Movement in Liechtenstein (VDBL), a National Socialist political party.

Der Umbruch was published from 5 October 1940 to 6 July 1943. Initially it was published weekly, but shifted to publication twice per week in March 1941. Martin Hilti served as editor until 1942. Other contributors included Alfons Goop, Sepp Ritter and Hermann Walser. The newspaper was printed by U. Goppel.

Der Umbruch wrote enthusiastically about the advances of the German military across Europe. The readers were mainly found amongst the followers of the movement. As of 1942 the newspaper had a circulation of around 300. The newspaper was banned by the government in July 1943.
