= Gemeindepolizei (Nazi Germany) =

Municipal police forces of Nazi Germany

Polizeiadler

Gemeindepolizei (GemPo) is the German name for a municipal law enforcement agency. This article deals with the municipal police forces of Nazi Germany. Municipalities with more than 2,000 residents, not having a state police presence, had to have a municipal police department. The mayors were police commissioners. Under them the municipal police departments were led by professional chiefs of police. Towns with over 10,000 residents having a municipal police department were also obliged to have a municipal criminal investigation division.

== Organization ==
Municipalities with more than 2,000 residents, not having a State protection police presence, had to have a municipal police department. In municipalities with less than 2,000 residents, the Gendarmerie was in charge of police protection. During the war, it was planned to extend the responsibility of the Gendarmerie to all towns with less than 5,000 residents, but it did not take place except to a very limited extent. In 1942 municipal police departments existed in 1,338 municipalities with more than 5,000 residents. Of these, five had more than 100,000 residents; 22 had 50–100,00, 591 had 10–50,000, and 720 had 5–10,000 residents.

== Municipal police departments ==
Vehicle flag for a Stadtpolizeidirektor

In smaller towns, the Bürgermeister was police commissioner. He was subordinated to the Landrat as head of the Landkreis police administration. In a city that constituted its own Stadtkreis, the Oberbürgermeister was both police commissioner and head of the district police administration. As such he was subordinated to the Regierungspräsident in each Regierungsbezirk. Under the police commissioners the municipal police departments were led by professional chiefs of police.

Size of the municipality	Police commissioner	Chief of police
27 cities with over 50,000 residents	Oberbürgermeister	Stadtpolizeidirektor
88 cities with 30–50,000 residents	Oberbürgermeister	Polizeioberinspektor
106 cities with 20–30,000 residents	Oberbürgermeister	Polizeioberkommissar; Polizeikommissar
1,117 towns with 5–20,000 residents	Bürgermeister	The nearest chief of the State protection police was also municipal chief of police.
Less than 5,000 residents	Bürgermeister	The nearest chief of the Gendarmerie was also municipal chief of police.

== Protection Police ==
The municipal protection police in larger cities were called Kommando der Schutzpolizei, while in smaller municipalities it was called Schutzpolizei-Dienstabteilung.

Size of the municipality	Commander of the municipal protection police	Rank as
27 cities with over 50,000 residents	Kommandeuer der Schutzpolizei	Oberstleutnant; Major
88 cities with 30–50,000 residents	Führer der Schutzpolizei-Dienstabteilung	Hauptmann
106 cities with 20–30,000 residents	Führer der Schutzpolizei-Dienstabteilung	Inspektor / Revieroberleutnant
1,117 towns with 5–20,000 residents	Führer der Schutzpolizei-Dienstabteilung	Obermeister / Revierleutnant; Meister

== Kriminalpolizei ==
Towns with over 10,000 residents having a municipal police department were also obliged to have a municipal criminal investigation division—Gemeindekriminalpolizeiabteilung. It was supervised by the nearest State criminal investigation department (Kripo-Stelle). As of 1943 all municipal criminal investigation divisions with more than 10 detectives (i.e. mainly in cities with more than 50,000 residents) were transferred to the state Kriminalpolizei.

=== Ranks in the municipal Kripo ===
Rank in the municipal Kripo	Equivalent rank in the state Kripo	Relative rank as
Kriminalassistent	Kriminalassistent	Revieroberwachtmeister
Kriminaloberassistent	Kriminaloberassistent	Hauptwachtmeister
Kriminalsekretär	Kriminalsekretär	Meister
Kriminalbezirkssekretär	Kriminalobersekretär	Obermeister / Revierleutnant
Kriminalinspektor	Kriminalinspektor	Inspektor / Revieroberleutnant
Kriminaloberinspektor	Kriminalkommissar	Revierhauptmann
