= Alfons Goop =

Liechtenstein politician and Waffen-SS volunteer (1910–1993)

- Goop in his later years

Leader of the German National Movement in Liechtenstein
- In office 1940 – March 1943
- Preceded by: Theodor Schädler
- Succeeded by: Sepp Ritter

Personal details
- Born: 15 October 1910 Schellenberg, Liechtenstein
- Died: 25 September 1993 (aged 82) Schaan, Liechtenstein
- Party: German National Movement in Liechtenstein
- Other political affiliations: Liechtenstein Homeland Service
- Spouse: Germana Wohlwend (m. 1937)
- Profession: Physician

Military service
- Allegiance: Nazi Germany
- Branch: Waffen-SS
- Years of service: 1940–1943
- Rank: SS-Hauptsturmführer
- Wars: World War II

Alfons Goop (15 October 1910 – 25 September 1993) was a Liechtensteiner politician during World War II. He was the leader of the German National Movement in Liechtenstein from 1940 to 1943, a Nazi Party that aimed to unify with Nazi Germany.

== Early life ==
Goop was born on 15 October 1910 in Schellenberg as the son of Carl Magnus Goop and Seraphina Marxer as one of six children. He attended high school in Feldkirch and studied Greek and Latin in Vienna, Basel and Innsbruck, where he received a directorate in philosophy. From 1935, he was a teacher at the secondary school in Eschen.

== Political career ==
Goop was involved in antisemitic agitation in Liechtenstein throughout the 1930s, inspired by the rise of Nazi Germany in 1933 and the anti-Jewish laws which led to a large number of Jews taking refuge in the country. He was previously aligned with the Liechtenstein Homeland Service but had become alienated with the party after they merged with the Christian-Social People's Party in 1936. After the Anschluss of Austria in 1938, he was heavily involved in the establishment of the German National Movement in Liechtenstein (VDBL) and headed the party. He was also a regular contributor to the VDBL party newspaper Der Umbruch.

In March 1938, the governing Progressive Citizens' Party and opposition Patriotic Union formed a coalition, assigning a roughly equal number of seats each, in order to prevent the VBDL from acquiring any seats in the Landtag.

In the same month of a visit to Berlin by Franz Joseph II and Josef Hoop, the VBDL staged an amateurish coup attempt, first trying to provoke an intervention from Nazi Germany by burning swastikas, followed by declaring an Anschluß with Germany. The leaders were almost immediately arrested and the hoped-for German invasion failed to materialise. The party was effectively defunct until Goop reformed it in 1940.

Until 1943, the party attempted to recruit Liechtensteiners into the Waffen-SS and gain public sympathy for the Nazi cause, which infuriated Switzerland. Due to Liechtenstein's neutrality in the conflict, the Germans became uncomfortable with the local activity towards the war. In 1943, the German Ministry of Foreign Affairs tried to force the VDBL to unite with the Patriotic Union, which greatly annoyed Goop, who resigned as party leader. He was then succeeded by Sepp Ritter.

According to court testimony, Goop was a member of the Waffen-SS until 1943. He reached the rank of SS-Hauptsturmführer. In this position, Goop taught at ethnic German schools in occupied Eastern territories. He was taken prisoner by the French in 1945 and escaped to Liechtenstein in 1946.

== Later life and death ==
In 1946, Goop was prosecuted for his collaboration. In 1947, he was convicted of high treason and sentenced to 2.5 years in prison, with credit for the time he served in French custody.

From 1950 to 1971, he was the managing director of the Liechtenstein Chamber of Commerce and Industry, as such he strengthened commercial enterprises and promoted the revision of the trade regulations as well as industrial training and further education.

Goop died on 25 September 1993 in Schaan, aged 82 years old.

== Personal life ==
Goop married Germana Wohlwend (21 January 1911 – 24 October 2005) on 23 September 1937 and they had no children together.

Goop was active in sporting administration, serving on the board of the Royal Liechtenstein Sports Association from 1936 and as secretary (1938–1939) and president (1940) of the Liechtenstein Olympic Committee.

== Honours ==
- Belgium: Order of Leopold (1958)
- Liechtenstein: Grand Cross of the Order of Merit of the Principality of Liechtenstein (1970)
