= History of the Jews in Liechtenstein =

The location of Liechtenstein (dark green) in Europe

The history of the Jews in Liechtenstein goes back nearly a century, in particular to the time of the Holocaust.

The Jewish community of Liechtenstein in 2022 is a population of 30 people who attend a synagogue in Switzerland.

== World War II ==
From 2001 to 2005, an international team of six historians (including Dan Michman and Peter Geiger) investigated the matter for the World Jewish Congress. Their conclusions are following.

In its report, the commission concludes that the tiny state did not employ slave workers and no assets belonging to Jewish families were confiscated but the country's refugee policy was ambivalent.

About 400 Jewish refugees fled to Liechtenstein during the Nazi era to find safety in the neutral Alpine principality during World War II, 235 were accepted but 165 were turned back. In addition, the principality allowed 144 Jews to become citizens "in return for high fees" during the Nazi era. Most of those new citizens (German: Neubürger) never lived in Liechtenstein but chose another country. The fact of being a Liechtensteiner made it easier for them to establish themselves in a Western country.

Even though it was sandwiched between neutral Switzerland and Nazi-controlled Austria, Liechtenstein still had some room to maneuver. Liechtenstein accepted mainly rich Jews, who were expected to spend their money in the country or who created jobs by establishing companies in the principality. Like most other Western and overseas countries, Liechtenstein tightened its immigration laws in 1938. Liechtenstein's policy can therefore be compared to that of other countries.

The family of Liechtenstein's Prince Franz Josef II bought 3 estates taken from Jews in Austria and Czechoslovakia, where rented Jewish inmates from a Nazi SS concentration camp near Vienna worked. No works of art plundered by the Nazis were traced to Liechtenstein collections.

== See also ==
- History of the Jews in Switzerland
- Israel–Liechtenstein relations
- The Holocaust
- Racial policy of Nazi Germany
- Religion in Liechtenstein
