= Schutzpolizei (Nazi Germany) =

State protection police force of Nazi Germany

Colors for the Schutzpolizei in Prussia 1933

The Schutzpolizei des Reiches or the Schupo was the state protection police of Nazi Germany and a branch of the Ordnungspolizei. Schutzpolizei is the German name for a uniformed police force. The Schutzpolizei des Reiches was the uniformed police of most cities and large towns. State police departments were in charge of protection police, Kripo criminal investigation divisions (Kriminalpolizei), and administrative police. The state protection police comprised a patrol branch, barracked police, traffic police, water police, mounted police, police communications units, and police aviation. Policemen were required to have previous military service, good physical and mental health, Aryan descent and membership in the Nazi Party.

== State police departments ==
State police departments (Staatliche Polizeiverwaltungen) were local and Kreis police administrations in charge of protection police, criminal investigation divisions (Kriminalabteilungen), and administrative police.

Municipality	State police department	Police commissioner
Small town	Polizeiamt	The Landrat, as head of the Landkreis police administration, was police commissioner. Under him, a police administrative official with the rank of Polizeirat or Polizeioberinspektor was in daily charge of the department.
Town	Polizeiamt	The nearest Polizeidirektor was also the commissioner for the department. Under him, a police administrative official with the rank of Polizeirat was in daily charge of the department.
City	Polizeidirektion	A police lawyer with the rank of Polizeidirektor.
Big city	Polizeipräsidium	A police lawyer with the rank of Polizeipräsident.

== Branches ==
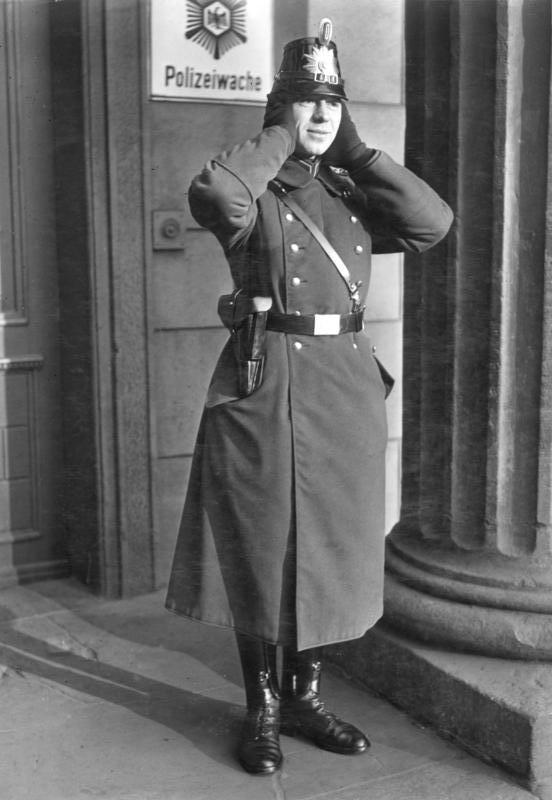
Policeman in the characteristic shako of the Schutzpolizei

In each state police department, there was a state protection police command (Kommando der Schutzpolizei), led by a chief of the local protection police (Kommandeuer der Schutzpolizei) .

=== Patrol branch ===
Under the protection police command was a territorial police organization for the patrol branch (Einzeldienst). It was consisted of three levels:

- Polizeirevier = precinct (20–40 policemen, with a population of 20–30,000 people)
- Polizeiabschnitt = police areas (five or more precincts)
- Polizeigruppe = police groups (three to five police areas; only in Berlin, Vienna and Hamburg)

=== Barracked police ===
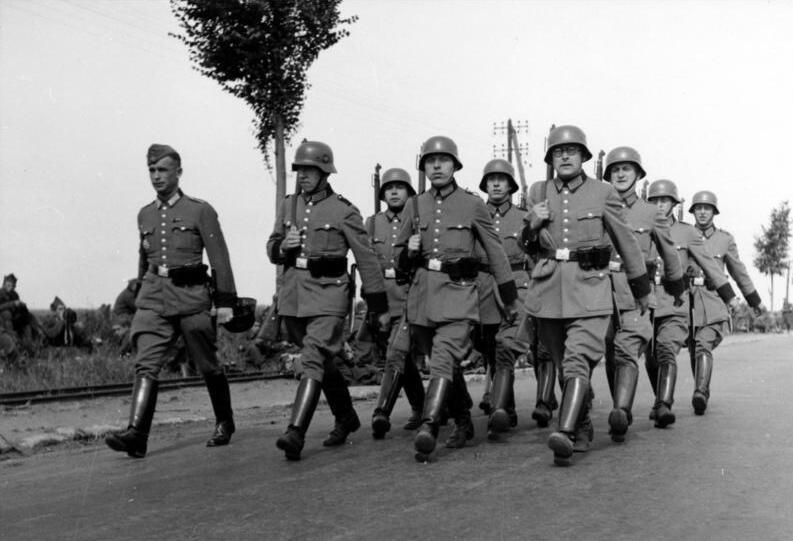
Schutzpolizei in France 1940; marching

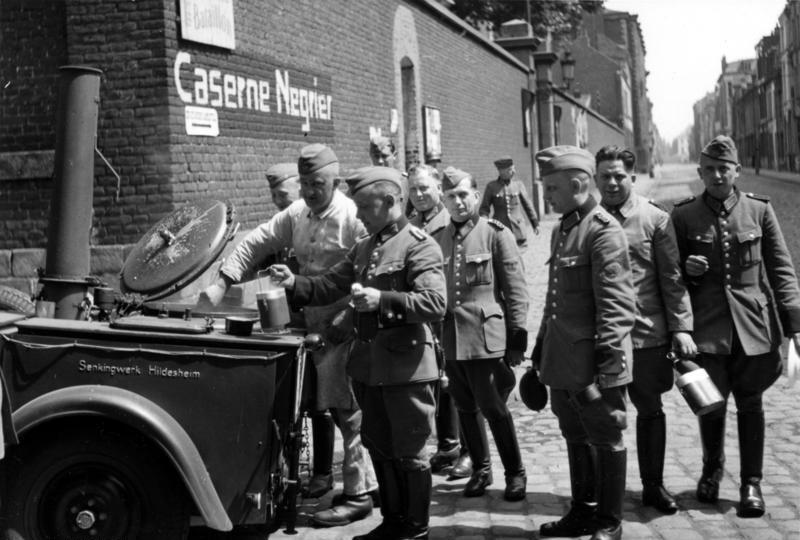
Schutzpolizei in France 1940; eating

The barracked police (Kasernierte Polizei) was a predecessor of today's German Bereitschaftspolizei riot police. It was normally organized in company-sized units (Hundertschaften) in larger cities. During World War II, the barracked police formed the core of police battalions serving in German-occupied Europe and the rear of the German army.

Also in the barracked police were motorized special units (Motorisierte Uberfallkommandos) equipped with armored cars. During the war, they were deployed to Western Europe to suppress anti-German demonstrations as well as to occupied Slovenia to keep the alpine roads open and combat local resistance.

During the war, police guard battalions (Polizei-Wachbataillone) were established, consisting of conscripted personnel in their fifties who were too old to be called up to the Wehrmacht. Each battalion consisted of 350–500 men, and each military district (Wehrkreis) had 3–4 guard battalions. They were armed with rifles and a small number of light machine guns. The main tasks of the guard battalions were maintaining order and controlling traffic in connection with civil defense efforts in locations subjected to Allied bombings.

=== Traffic police ===
Fifty-one traffic police units (Motorisierte Verkehrsbereitschaften) were formed in 1937 for traffic control in the larger cities. Nazi Germany's enlargement led to more such units being added in the incorporated areas. Traffic police were equipped with patrol cars, patrol motorcycles, and command vehicles. In cities with over 200,000 inhabitants, there were also specific traffic accident units (Verkehrsunfallbereitschaften) equipped with special vehicles for traffic accidents. In 1941, a Motorisierte Verkehrskompanie zbV was established to ensure that wartime traffic regulations were complied with, such as rules concerning driving permits and gasoline rationing. Its five platoons operated over the entire country.

=== Water police ===
Wasserschutzpolizei, the coast guard or water police, was an organization similar to today's Wasserschutzpolizei. It was in charge of coastal and internal waterways as well as harbor policing. It was the successor to the German Empire's Reichswasserschutz and absorbed the maritime police (Schiffahrtspolizei) and harbor police in 1937.

=== Mounted police ===
The mounted police was either an independent unit or part of a larger unit that also contained foot patrols. The basic units were the Polizei-Reiterstaffeln (mounted troops). By 1938, Berlin, Königsberg, Stettin, Breslau, and Gleiwitz had gained larger specific mounted police units, each consisting of three solely mounted units. In other cities, the mounted troops formed part of combined units. During the war, police cavalry regiments and battalions were part of the police battalions serving in German-occupied countries.

=== Police communications ===
Police signal squads (Polizei-Nachrichtenstaffeln) were the local components of the police communications service. Radio, telephone, telex were used on their own secure lines, separate from the general public. Mobile radio stations along the highways and in larger cities belonged to special Nachrichtenbereitschaften (signal companies). During the war, police signal companies formed part of the Police Battalions serving in the occupied countries.

=== Police aviation ===
Police aviation had existed in Germany since World War I. Police aircraft performed border patrols, conducted surveillance of highways and sea routes, conducted forest fire flights, courier flights and was used for communications. By 1940, there was a police air unit (Polizeifliegerabteilung) with nine aircraft; most of which were stationed in Berlin or Poland. In 1942, it was transferred to the Luftwaffe, forming the Fliegergruppe z.b.V. 7, although the aircraft continued to be operated by police aviators.

== Personnel ==
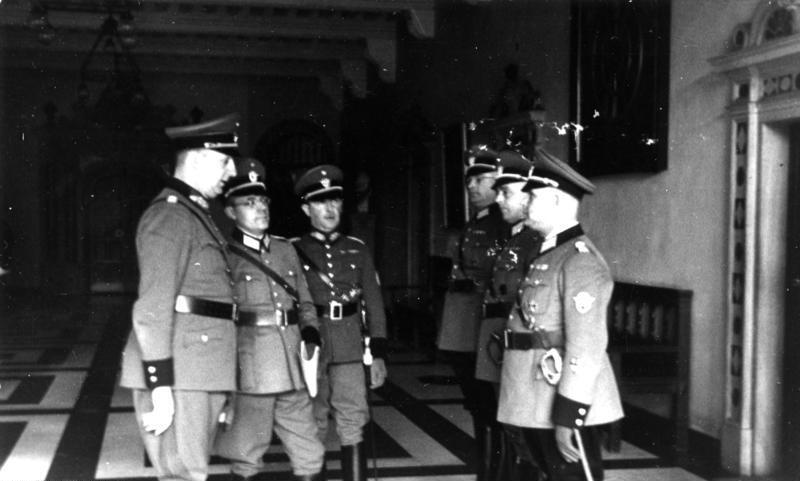
The Bremen Schutzpolizei is inspected by the chief of the Ordnungspolizei Kurt Daluege 1937.

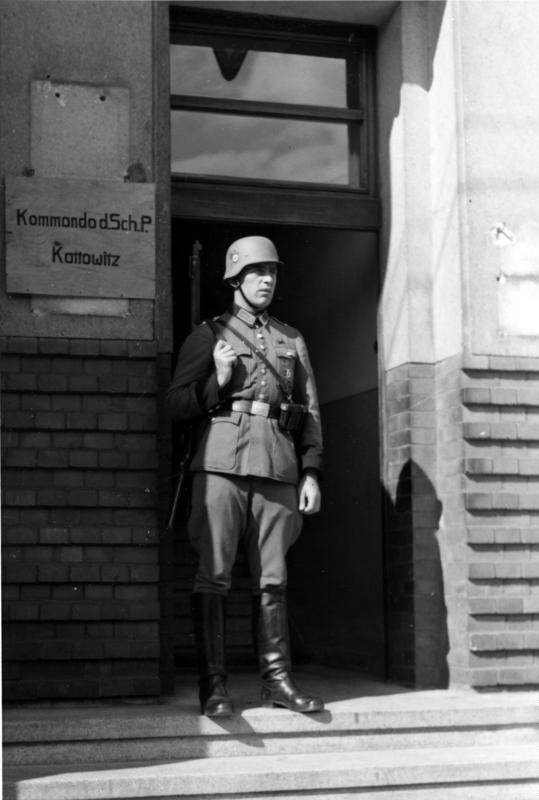
Sentry from the Schutzpolizei in Katowice, Poland, in 1939

=== Employment and training ===
==== Policemen ====
To be accepted as a police trainee before the war, the following requirements had to be fulfilled:

- German citizenship
- No criminal record
- Height at least 170 cm (67 in)
- Completed military service as a squad leader or four years of employment in the SS-Verfügungstruppe.
- 20–25 years old
- Unmarried
- Approved physical and mental tests; a sports badge was a merit.
- Membership in the Nazi Party.
- SS-qualification, i.e. approved medical examination by a SS-doctor and an approved Aryan lineage through genealogy conducted by the SS; intelligence and general knowledge tests.

Police training was given at special police training companies.

==== Police officers ====
Police officers were mainly recruited from the SS-Junker Schools (SS-Junkerschulen) in Bad Tölz, Braunschweig and Klagenfurt. Others had to fulfill the same basic requirements as the police trainees (see above) in addition to having taken the general university entrance exam (Abitur) and having gained the rank of SS-Anwärter. Police officer training was conducted at police officer schools in Berlin-Köpenick and Fürstenfeldbruck.

=== Terms of employment ===
==== Promotion ====
Policemen were promoted according to a regulated career system. A Wachtmeister was promoted to Oberwachtmeister after a minimum of six years of service and to Revieroberwachtmeister after seven years. After twelve years, policemen were guaranteed a promotion to Hauptwachtmeister. Selection for promotion to Meister could take place after 16 years. Some Meisters could be selected for promotion to Revierleutnanteand Revieroberleutnante. After five year as a police lieutenant, and at an age of at least 50 years, promotion to Revierhauptmann could take place.

Promotion for officers was determined by merit and seniority. Promotion to Hauptmann required a written civil service exam, while promotion to Major required a three months promotional course at a police officer school. A special police general staff school was opened for this purpose in Dresden.

==== Rank and pay ====
- See: Rank and pay of the Ordnungspolizei
