= Wilhelm Schmid (SA-Gruppenführer) =

German Nazi SA general (1889–1934)

Führer, SA-Gruppe Hochland
- In office 15 September 1933 – 30 June 1934
- Preceded by: Wilhelm Helfer
- Succeeded by: Wilhelm Helfer
- Fuhrer, SA-Obergruppe VII: August Schneidhuber

Chief of the Personnel Department Supreme SA Leadership (OSAF)
- In office 1 July 1932 – 18 November 1933
- Stabschef: Ernst Röhm

Leader of Sub-department IIa Supreme SA Leadership (OSAF)
- In office 1931 – 1 July 1932
- Stabschef: Ernst Röhm

Additional positions
- 1933–1934: Reichstag Deputy

Personal details
- Born: 3 June 1889 Munich, Kingdom of Bavaria, German Empire
- Died: 30 June 1934 (aged 45) Stadelheim Prison, Munich, Bavaria, Nazi Germany
- Cause of death: Execution by firing squad
- Party: Nazi Party
- Profession: Military officer
- Awards: Blood Order

Military service
- Allegiance: German Empire; Weimar Republic
- Branch/service: Royal Bavarian Army; Freikorps; Reichswehr
- Years of service: 1909–1921
- Rank: Hauptmann
- Unit: 11th Bavarian Infantry Regiment; 23rd Bavarian Infantry Regiment; 19th Reichswehr Infantry Regiment
- Battles/wars: World War I Bavarian Soviet Republic; Ruhr uprising

Wilhelm Schmid (3 June 1889 – 30 June 1934) was a German military officer and an SA-Gruppenführer in the Sturmabteilung (SA), the Nazi Party's paramilitary organization. He held high level positions in the Supreme SA Leadership and as an SA field commander in Bavaria. From 1933 to 1934, Schmid also was a deputy of the Reichstag. He was arrested and executed during the Night of the Long Knives.

== Early life and military career ==
Schmid was born in Munich to a Catholic family. After attending Volksschule and graduating from the elite Wilhelmsgymnasium in Munich in 1909, he entered the Royal Bavarian Army as a Fahnenjunker (officer cadet) in the 11th Infantry Regiment. Commissioned as a Leutnant in 1911, he participated in the First World War from 1914 to 1918 with the Royal Bavarian 23rd Infantry Regiment, during which he successively served as a commander at the platoon, company and battalion levels.

After the end of the war, Schmid joined the Freikorps unit headed by fellow-Bavarian Franz Ritter von Epp and took part in the suppression of the Bavarian Soviet Republic and the Ruhr uprising between 1919 and 1920. He then remained as an officer in the Weimar Republic's Reichswehr, as a company commander of Infantry Regiment 19. He resigned from the army in the spring of 1921 with the rank of Hauptmann. In 1923, he joined the Nazi Party and the Bund Reichskriegsflagge, a paramilitary organization controlled by Ernst Röhm. On 9 November of the same year, he took part in Adolf Hitler's failed Beer Hall Putsch in Munich, for which he would later be awarded the Blood Order. In the following years, Schmid worked as a commercial merchant and was temporarily unemployed.

== Career in the Nazi Party's Sturmabteilung (SA) ==
It was not until 1 February 1931 that Schmid rejoined the Nazi Party (membership number 505,892). He also joined the Sturmabteilung (SA), the Party's paramilitary organization, where Ernst Röhm, the SA-Stabschef since January 1931, appointed him to the Obersten SA-Führung (OSAF – Supreme SA Leadership) in Munich. He was promoted to SA-Oberführer on 15 November 1931, and served as the leader of the sub-department IIa (Human Resources) until 1 July 1932 when he advanced to chief of Department II (SA Personnel). On 1 March 1933, he was promoted to SA-Gruppenführer and was named as the Special Commissioner of OSAF to the government of Upper Bavaria. On 15 September 1933, he was given a field command as the acting commander of the SA-Gruppe Hochland, based in Munich. This appointment was made permanent on 18 November of that year and he left his personnel department post at that time.

Schmid was one of the highest-ranking SA officers in Munich, along with his immediate supervisor, SA-Obergruppenführer August Schneidhuber, the commander of SA-Obergruppe VII and the Munich police chief. At the November 1933 German parliamentary election, Schmid was elected as a Reichstag deputy from electoral constituency 30 (Chemnitz-Zwickau). He would hold this seat until his death in June 1934.

== Arrest and death ==
Alarmed by the growing size and power of the SA, and seeking to alleviate similar concerns on the part of the German military high command, Reich Chancellor Hitler decided to launch a purge against Röhm and his inner circle in an operation that became known as the Night of the Long Knives. The SA leaders were gathered for a meeting at the Bavarian spa town of Bad Wiessee on 30 June 1934. The purge was already underway by Hitler loyalists when his plane landed in nearby Munich at 4:00 am. The local Nazi Party Gauleiter and Bavarian Interior Minister, Adolf Wagner, had begun to arrest the Munich SA leaders. Hitler drove to the Interior Ministry, confronted Schmid and Schneidhuber there and told them that they had been charged with treason and would be shot. He dismissed them from all of their positions and, in a fit of rage, tore the epaulets from their uniforms. They were transported from the ministry building directly to Stadelheim Prison. Later that day, a list of the prisoners being held there was prepared by the prison governor and sent to Hitler at the Munich Party headquarters. Hitler personally checked off the names of Schmid and Schneihuber for execution, together with four other SA leaders: SA-Obergruppenführer Edmund Heines, SA-Gruppenführer Hans Hayn, SA-Brigadeführer Peter von Heydebreck and SA-Standartenführer Hans Erwin Graf von Spreti-Weilbach. That evening, in the prison courtyard, all six were shot by a firing squad composed of members of the Leibstandarte SS Adolf Hitler under then SS-Gruppenführer Sepp Dietrich.

Schmid's corpse and those of the other men were initially buried in a wooden box at Munich's Friedhof am Perlacher Forst on the night of 1 July 1934. On 21 July, the bodies were exhumed and cremated in the crematorium at the Munich Ostfriedhof. The families were told to bury the urns containing the ashes of their dead within five minutes. Only five relatives and a clergyman were allowed to take part.

Also killed during the purge was Willi Schmid, the 41-year-old music critic of a Munich daily newspaper, the Münchner Neueste Nachrichten, who was arrested in his home by four SS men on the evening of 30 June and killed in Dachau concentration camp. He was a victim of mistaken identity, believed to have been confused with either SA-Gruppenführer Wilhelm Schmid or Ludwig Schmitt, an associate of Hitler opponent Otto Strasser.

== Sources ==
- Bullock, Alan (1962). Hitler: A Study in Tyranny. New York: Harper Torchbooks. ISBN 978-0-060-92020-3.
- Campbell, Bruce (1998). The SA Generals and the Rise of Nazism. Lexington: University Press of Kentucky. ISBN 978-0-813-12047-8.
- Höhne, Heinz (1971). The Order of the Death's Head: The Story of Hitler's SS. New York: Ballantine Books. ISBN 0-345-28333-3.
- Information about Wilhelm Schmid (SA-Gruppenführer) in the Reichstag database
- Lilla, Joachim: Schmid, Wilhelm entry in Staatsminister, Leitende Verwaltungsbeamte und (NS-)Funktionsträger in Bayern, 1918 bis 1945.
- Shirer, William (1960). The Rise and Fall of the Third Reich. New York: Simon and Schuster. ISBN 978-0-831-77404-2.
- Stockhorst, Erich (1985) 5000 Köpfe: Wer War Was im 3. Reich. Arndt, p. 384. ISBN 978-3-887-41116-9
