= Hans Erwin Graf von Spreti-Weilbach =

German Nazi SA officer (1908–1934)

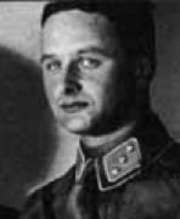
- Spreti-Weilbach c. 1933

Chief Adjutant to the SA-Stabschef
- In office 1933–1934

Personal details
- Born: Hans Erwin Karl Ernst Martin Graf von Spreti-Weilbach; 24 September 1908 Karlsruhe, Grand Duchy of Baden, German Empire
- Died: 30 June 1934 (aged 25) Munich, Bavaria, Nazi Germany
- Cause of death: Execution by firing squad
- Party: Nazi Party
- Relatives: Cajetan Graf von Spreti (cousin)
- Education: Christian Albrecht University of Kiel; Royal Academy for Agriculture and Brewing

Hans Erwin Karl Ernst Martin Graf von Spreti-Weilbach (24 September 1908 – 30 June 1934) was a member of a German noble family who joined the Nazi Party. He rose to become an SA-Standartenführer in its paramilitary branch, the Sturmabteilung (SA). He served as the chief adjutant to Ernst Röhm, the SA-Stabschef, and was executed by members of the Leibstandarte SS Adolf Hitler during the Night of the Long Knives.

== Family and education ==
Spreti-Weilbach was descended from the junior branch (Weilbach) of the Spreti family, members of the German nobility originally of Italian origin. He was born in Karlsruhe, the son of a military officer and merchant. He was the youngest of four children and the last surviving son, his two older brothers having died in the First World War. A cousin from the senior (Kapfing) family line, Cajetan Graf von Spreti, became an SA officer and an official in the Reich Ministry of Labor.

Spreti-Weilbach first was taught by private tutors, then attended the Theresien-Gymnasium Munich from 1920 to 1922 and the Neue Realgymnasium in Munich until 1927. He earned his Abitur in March 1928 from a private school in Magdeburg. He then completed an agricultural internship before beginning his studies in agriculture in 1929 at the Royal Academy for Agriculture and Brewing (today, the TUM School of Life Sciences) in Weihenstephan. He transferred to the Christian Albrecht University of Kiel before returning to Weihenstephan and completing his studies in August 1932 with a degree in agriculture.

== Career in the SA ==
In 1930, Spreti-Weilbach joined the Nazi Party (membership number 341,877) and its paramilitary formation, the Sturmabteilung (SA). By 1931, he joined the inner circle of Ernst Röhm, who had recently returned from Bolivia and been appointed SA-Stabschef by Adolf Hitler. On 5 January 1932, Spreti-Weilbach was commissioned as an SA-Sturmführer and assigned as an SA-Führer for special tasks in the SA-Standarte 2 of SA-Gruppe Hochland in Munich. From 1 July 1932 to 1 May 1933, he was an SA-Führer for special tasks in the Supreme SA Leadership, with a position in the adjutant's office under Röhm.

Spreti-Weilbach already was among Röhm's closest collaborators in March 1932 when Walter Buch, the chief judge of the Party's internal judicial body, the Uschla, and his son-in-law Martin Bormann planned to free the Party from the political liability of the public scandals surrounding Röhm's homosexuality by arranging to have him murdered. In addition to Röhm, four men from his immediate circle, including Spreti-Weilbach, were also slated to be killed. Spreti-Weilbach was targeted by the conspirators not only because of his close association with Röhm, but also because he was suspected of being a homosexual like his chief. The plot unraveled when the alleged hitman warned one of the other intended victims.

Shortly after the Nazi seizure of power in January 1933, Spreti-Weilbach was promoted to the rank of SA-Sturmbannführer on 1 April. In May 1933, he was next assigned to SA-Gruppe Schlesien. On 1 November 1933, he returned from Silesia to again serve on the staff of the Supreme SA Leadership, this time as Röhm's chief adjutant. In this position, which he held until his death, he was promoted to SA-Standartenführer on 1 March 1934.

== Arrest and death ==
However, within four months of his promotion, Spreti-Weilbach was arrested and shot during the Night of the Long Knives. Accounts of what occurred differ in some details. One version indicates that Spreti-Weilbach was present with Röhm in the Bavarian spa town of Bad Wiessee. There, in the early morning hours of June 30, he was arrested together with other members of the SA leadership by a contingent of the Bavarian political police under Hitler's personal command and taken to Stadelheim prison in Munich. It also was reported that Spreti-Weilbach was arrested by Hitler himself, attacked with a whip and badly beaten.

According to German historian Wolfram Selig, who relied on information from Spreti-Weilbach's sister, Spreti-Weilbach was not arrested in Bad Wiessee, but taken into custody when he arrived at the Munich central train station on the morning of 30 June.

In any event, the accounts agree that Spreti-Weilbach was jailed at Stadelheim where he was executed by firing squad in the evening of 30 June by members of the Leibstandarte SS Adolf Hitler under the command of Sepp Dietrich. Also murdered together with him were five other top SA leaders: Hans Hayn, Edmund Heines, Peter von Heydebreck, Wilhelm Schmid and August Schneidhuber.

An eyewitness to the executions described them to the journalist Erwein von Aretin who later published an article describing them:

Next came the young Count Spreti, who tried to protest against the incident in an agitated manner and was rudely told to calm down by the SS leader. He too had his sentence read out to him, but died, like all those who followed, shouting: "I die for Germany. Heil Hitler!" Shortly before he was shot, Spreti-Weilbach managed to write a farewell message to his family on a business card that read: "Don't forget me! I too fell for the fatherland."

Spreti-Weilbach's body was initially buried in Munich's Friedhof am Perlacher Forst, but was exhumed and cremated on 21 July 1934 and presented to his parents in a funeral urn. The urn was then buried in the family grave in Hebertshausen, with no public notice or ceremony. His father unsuccessfully sought to obtain an explanation for the murder of his son through inquiries to Deputy Führer Rudolf Hess and Reichsführer-SS Heinrich Himmler.

== Sources ==
- Dornheim, Andreas (1998). Röhm's Mann fürs Ausland: Politik und Ermordung des SA-Agenten Georg Bell. Münster: LIT. ISBN 978-3-825-83596-5.
- Höhne, Heinz (1971). The Order of the Death's Head: The Story of Hitler's SS. New York: Ballantine Books. ISBN 0-345-28333-3.
- Olden, Rudolf (1981). Hitler. Gerstenberg. ISBN 978-3-806-70873-8.
- Reitlinger, Gerald (1957). The SS Alibi of a Nation 1922-1945. New York: The Viking Press.
- Selig, Wolfram (1992). "Die Opfer des Röhm-Putsches in München". In Becker, Winfried; Chrobak, Werner (eds.). Staat, Kultur, Politik. Beiträge zur Geschichte Bayerns und des Katholizismus. Kallmünz: Verlag Michael Laßleben. ISBN 978-3-784-73109-4.
- Spreti, Heinrich Graf von (1995). Die Spreti. Geschichte des altadeligen Hauses Spreti. Kapfing: PC-Print GmbH.
