= August Schneidhuber =

German Nazi SA general (1888–1934)

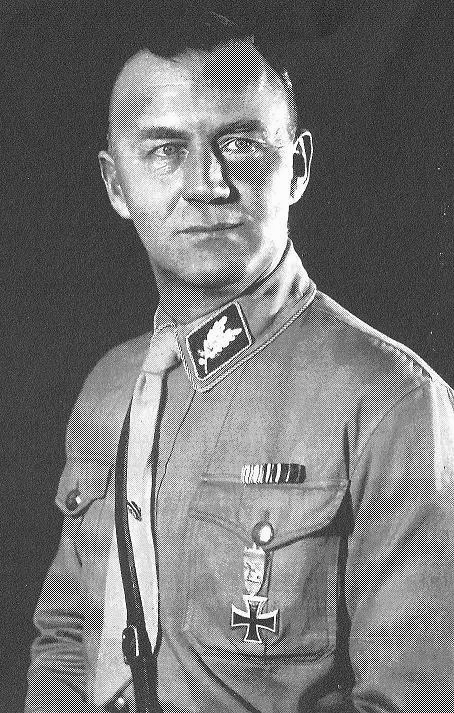
- Schneidhuber as an SA-Oberführer (1930)

Police President, Munich
- In office 7 April 1933 – 30 June 1934
- Preceded by: Heinrich Himmler
- Succeeded by: Otto von Oelhafen

Führer, SA-Obergruppe VII
- In office 1 July 1933 – 30 June 1934

Führer, SA-Obergruppe IV
- In office 1 April 1933 – 30 June 1933

Führer, SA-Obergruppe III
- In office 15 September 1932 – 31 March 1933

Additional positions
- 1932–1934: Reichstag Deputy
- 1931–1932: Führer, SA-Gruppe West
- 1931: Führer, SA-Gruppe Süd
- 1929–1931: Deputy OSAF-Süd

Personal details
- Born: 8 May 1887 Traunstein, Kingdom of Bavaria, German Empire
- Died: 30 June 1934 (aged 47) Munich, Bavaria, Nazi Germany
- Cause of death: Execution by firing squad
- Party: Nazi Party
- Profession: Military officer

Military service
- Allegiance: German Empire; Weimar Republic
- Branch/service: Imperial German Army; Reichswehr
- Years of service: 1914–1918; 1919–1920
- Rank: Major of reserves
- Unit: 1st Royal Bavarian Foot Artillery Regiment
- Battles/wars: World War I
- Awards: Iron Cross, 1st and 2nd class

Ludwig Ernst August Schneidhuber (8 May 1887 – 30 June 1934) was a German military officer and an SA-Obergruppenführer in the Sturmabteilung (SA), the Nazi Party's paramilitary organization. He held several high-level SA commands and was the Police President in Munich. He was murdered along with many other SA leaders in the Night of the Long Knives.

== Early life and military career ==
Schneidhuber was born in Traunstein, the son of a judicial officer. He entered the Royal Bavarian Army as an officer cadet. In March 1907 he was commissioned as a Leutnant in the Royal Bavarian 1st Foot Artillery Regiment. He married Ida Wassermann, a Jewish woman, with whom he had two daughters (born 1914 and 1919). The couple divorced in 1920. Due to her former marriage, Ida Schneidhuber was given lenient treatment during the Holocaust and survived the Theresienstadt Ghetto.

During the First World War, Schneidhuber was deployed on the western front from 1914 to 1918. During the war he was employed as a regimental adjutant, an artillery battery commander, an instructor at the foot artillery school in Maubeuge and in various staff positions. In 1914, he was promoted to Oberleutnant and, in 1916, to Hauptmann. He was awarded the Iron Cross, 1st and 2nd class, was wounded in a poison gas attack and remained hospitalized until the summer of 1919. In 1920, Schneidhuber officially resigned from the Reichswehr with the rank of Major of the reserves. Returning to civilian life, he settled in the Chiemgau area of Bavaria and made his living as a farmer.

== Career in the Nazi Party Sturmabteilung (SA) ==
According to Baldur von Schirach, Schneidhuber was an early adherent of the Nazi movement. He belonged to the Citizens' Defense, a far-right paramilitary organization until 1921, and joined the Nazi Party for the first time that year. From 1924 to 1925, Schneidhuber headed a völkisch group, the German-Völkischer Officers' Association, in Rosenheim. He moved to Hanover and, after rejoining the Nazi Party that had been re-established in 1925 (membership number 75,401), he founded local Party groups and organized the SA in the area. In 1928, he became an SA-Standartenführer assigned to Gau Lüneburg-Stade.

Beginning in 1929, Schneidhuber held many senior-level command positions in the SA. From 8 February 1929 to 1 April 1931, he reported directly to Supreme SA Leader (OSAF) Franz Pfeffer von Salomon as the Deputy OSAF-Süd, in command of all SA units in Bavaria, Württemberg and Baden. Following the appointment of Ernst Röhm as the new SA-Stabschef on 1 January 1931, the SA commands were reorganized and the posts of Deputy-OSAF were eliminated. Schneidhuber remained in command of the renamed SA-Gruppe Süd from 2 April to July 1931, headquartered in Munich.

From 10 September 1931 until 14 September 1932, Schneidhuber led SA-Gruppe West with headquarters in Koblenz, and he was promoted to SA-Gruppenführer on 14 October 1931. At the July 1932 parliamentary election, he was elected to the Reichstag for electoral constituency 33 (Hesse-Darmstadt), where he served without interruption until his death. Responding to the rapid increase in SA membership, Röhm in July 1932 again reorganized the SA, establishing even larger command structures, the SA-Obergruppen, each roughly equivalent to an army corps. On 15 September 1932, Schneidhuber took over the leadership of the newly-formed SA-Obergruppe III, which included not only the SA-Gruppe West, but the SA-Gruppe Niederrhein and SA-Gruppe Westfalen as well. On 1 January 1933, he was among the first group of officers promoted to the new rank of SA-Obergruppenführer.

On 1 April 1933, shortly after the Nazi seizure of power, Schneidhuber returned to Bavaria, where he took over the leadership of SA-Obergruppe IV, a prestigious appointment based in Munich, the Bavarian capital and the location of the Nazi Party headquarters. His new command was composed of three SA-Gruppen: Franken, Hochland, and Südwest. On 7 April 1933, he was appointed Police President of Munich, succeeding Heinrich Himmler who advanced to become commander of the political police for all of Bavaria. On 1 July 1933, Schneidhuber's command was renamed SA-Obergruppe VII, and consisted of the three SA-Gruppen, Bayern Ostmark, Franken and Hochland. From 10 April 1934, he was also a member of the Bavarian state cabinet, sitting as Röhm's permanent deputy as the representative of the SA.

== Arrest and death ==
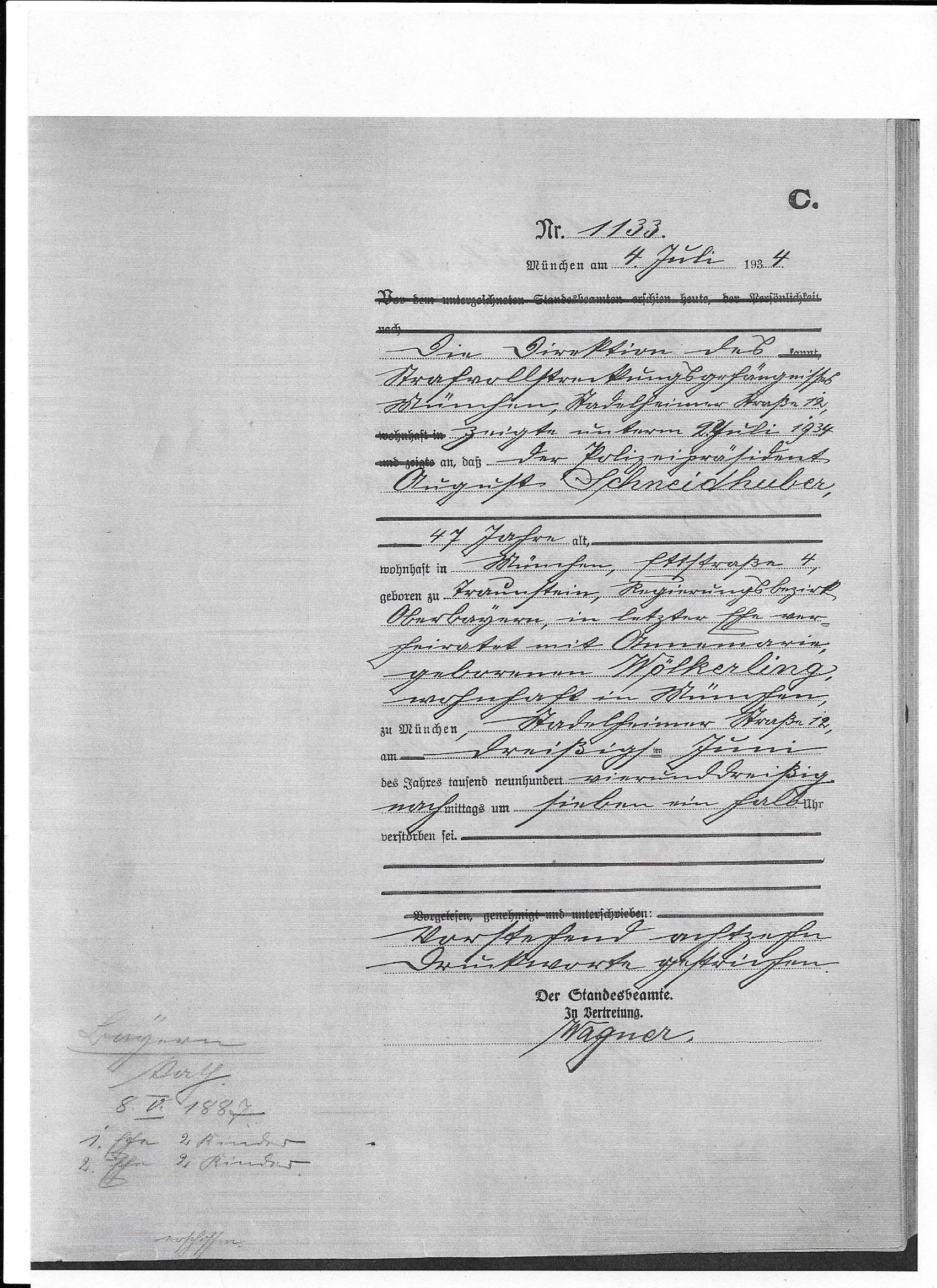
Schneidhuber's death certificate, dated 4 July 1934 and filed in the Munich Municipal Registry Office

Alarmed by the growing size and power of the SA, and seeking to alleviate similar concerns on the part of the German military high command, Reich Chancellor Adolf Hitler decided to launch a purge against Röhm and his inner circle in an operation that became known as the Night of the Long Knives. The SA leaders were gathered for a meeting at the Bavarian spa town of Bad Wiessee on 30 June 1934. The purge was already underway by Hitler loyalists when his plane landed in nearby Munich at 4:00 am. The local Nazi Party Gauleiter and Bavarian Interior Minister, Adolf Wagner, had arrested Schneidhuber. Also arrested was his deputy, SA-Gruppenführer Wilhelm Schmid, commander of SA-Gruppe Hochland. Schmid was a veteran of the Beer Hall Putsch and a holder of the Blood Order. Hitler drove to the Interior Ministry, confronted the two prisoners and told them that they had been charged with treason and would be shot. He dismissed Schneidhuber and Schmid from all of their positions and, in a fit of rage, tore the epaulets from their uniforms. They were taken to Stadelheim Prison where, later that day, they were shot by members of the Leibstandarte SS Adolf Hitler under then SS-Gruppenführer Sepp Dietrich, together with four other SA leaders: SA-Obergruppenführer Edmund Heines, SA-Gruppenführer Hans Hayn, SA-Brigadeführer Peter von Heydebreck and SA-Standartenführer Hans Erwin Graf von Spreti-Weilbach.

Schneidhuber's corpse, along with those of the other men were initially buried in a wooden box at Munich's Friedhof am Perlacher Forst on the night of 1 July 1934. According to a contemporaneous report in The New York Times, a floral wreath with the words: "To Our Dear Father From His Sons" was removed from the grave a few days later on the orders of the authorities and carted away in a wheelbarrow. On 21 July, the bodies were exhumed and cremated in the crematorium at the Munich Ostfriedhof. The families were told to bury the urns containing the ashes of their dead within five minutes. Only five relatives and a clergyman were allowed to take part.

== See also ==
- Liste der SA-Gruppen und -Obergruppen

== Sources ==
- August Schneihuber entry in the Hessian Regional History Information System (LAGIS)
- Bullock, Alan (1962). Hitler: A Study in Tyranny. New York: Harper Torchbooks. ISBN 978-0-060-92020-3.
- Campbell, Bruce (1998). The SA Generals and the Rise of Nazism. Lexington: University Press of Kentucky. ISBN 978-0-813-12047-8.
- Lepage, Jean-Denis (2016). Hitler's Stormtroopers: The SA, The Nazi's Brownshirts, 1922–1945. Frontline Books. ISBN 978-1-399-07721-7.
- Lilla, Joachim; Doring, Martin & Schulz, Andreas (2004). Statisten in Uniform: Die Mitglieder des Reichstags 1933–1945. Ein biographisches Handbuch. Unter Einbeziehung der völkischen und nationalsozialistischen Reichstagsabgeordneten ab Mai 1924. Droste. p. 581 ISBN 3-7700-5254-4
- Lilla, Joachim: Schneidhuber, August entry in Staatsminister, Leitende Verwaltungsbeamte und (NS-)Funktionsträger in Bayern, 1918 bis 1945.
- Miller, Michael D.; Schulz, Andreas (2015). Leaders of the SS & German Police. Vol. 2 Reichsführer SS – Gruppenführer (Hans Haltermann to Walter Kruger). R. James Bender Publishing. ISBN 978-1-932-97025-8.
- Schirach, Baldur von: (1933). Die Pioniere des Dritten Reiches. Essen: Zentralstelle für den deutschen Freiheitskampf.
- Selig, Wolfram: (1992) Die Opfer des Röhm-Putsches in München. in: Winfried Becker & Werner Chrobak (Hg.): Staat, Kultur, Politik. Beiträge zur Geschichte Bayerns und des Katholizismus. Festschrift zum 65. Geburtstag von Dieter Albrecht. Kallmünz: Michael Lassleben Verlag, ISBN 3-7847-3109-0.
- Shirer, William (1960). The Rise and Fall of the Third Reich. New York: Simon and Schuster. ISBN 978-0-831-77404-2.
- Stockhorst, Erich (1985) 5000 Köpfe: Wer War Was im 3. Reich. Arndt, p. 392. ISBN 978-3-887-41116-9
