= Cajetan Graf von Spreti =

German Nazi SA officer (1905–1989)

Operations Staff Chief Uman Recruitment Commission Reichskommissariat Ukraine
- In office 1941–1944

Personal details
- Born: Cajetan Maria Theodor von Spreti; 8 February 1905 Munich, Kingdom of Bavaria, German Empire
- Died: 17 November 1989 (aged 84) Moosburg an der Isar, Bavaria, West Germany
- Party: Nazi Party
- Spouse(s): Emilie Anna Eugenie Sara Maria (divorced) Kunigunde Nüsslein (died 1983)
- Children: 7
- Parents: Adolf von Spreti (1866–1945) (father); Anna Gräfin von Yrsch (1874–1944) (mother)
- Relatives: Karl von Spreti; Franz Graf von Spreti; Maximilian Josef Friedrich Maria von Spreti

Cajetan Graf von Spreti (8 February 1905 – 17 November 1989) was a member of a German noble family who joined the Nazi Party. He became an officer in its paramilitary branch, the Sturmabteilung, and was an organizer of acts of political terror. During the Second World War, he was involved in the recruitment and deportation of thousands of Ukrainians to Nazi Germany as forced laborers. Detained after the end of the war, he never was brought to trial for his crimes.

== Family and education ==
Spreti was the scion of the Spreti family, members of the German nobility originally of Italian origin. He was born in Munich, the eldest of the four children of Adolf Graf von Spreti and his second wife Anna Grafin von Spreti, née Grafin von Yrsch. His younger brothers were the diplomat Karl von Spreti and the Bavarian politician Franz Graf von Spreti.

After attending Volksschule and Realgymnasium, Spreti studied for two semesters at an agricultural college and then completed a four-year agricultural internship.

== Nazi Party career ==
On 1 June 1930, Spreti joined the Nazi Party (membership number 254,085) and the Sturmabteilung, its paramilitary unit, being commissioned as an SA-Sturmführer in October 1931.

In 1932, Spreti was assigned to the SA-Gruppe Schlesien. On 1 July 1932, he was appointed adjutant of SA-Untergruppe Mittelschlesien-Süd and promoted to the rank of SA-Sturmbannführer. Together with his commanding officer, SA-Oberführer Hanns Günther von Obernitz, Spreti organized a campaign of public terror consisting of several bomb attacks against political opponents carried out by SA members in August 1932 in the vicinity of Schweidnitz (today, Świdnica). The public prosecutor sought to bring charges against the pair, but they evaded arrest by fleeing to Merano in Italy. Efforts were made to obtain their extradition, however, following the Nazi seizure of power on 30 January 1933, the legal proceedings against them were dropped.

After his return to Germany, Spreti settled in Munich. On 25 November 1933, he was appointed to the position of 2nd adjutant of SA-Obergruppe VII (Bavaria) under SA-Obergruppenführer August Schneidhuber. Spreti was thus a member of the leadership cadre of one of the largest SA formations in the country, comprising almost 200,000 men. On 15 March 1934, he was promoted to SA-Obersturmbannführer. However, just over three months later, Schneidhuber, SA-Stabschef Ernst Röhm and several other high ranking SA leaders were forcibly removed from office and shot during the Night of the Long Knives. Also among those killed was Spreti's cousin, SA-Standartenführer Hans Erwin Graf von Spreti-Weilbach, who served as Röhm's chief adjutant. However, Spreti remained in his post and was involved in the dissolution of SA-Obergruppe VII. He then was transferred to the SA Brigade in Traunstein, before again moving to Rosenheim as the Fuhrer of an SA-Sturmbann.

In 1935, a dispute arose between Spreti and the antisemitic tabloid newspaper Der Stürmer published by Julius Streicher, the Gauleiter of Franconia. The paper published an article with the headline "Count Spreti. Spreti's Judaized Family Tree," in which it claimed that there were Jews among his ancestors. Spreti, viewed the article as a libelous defamation and sent a telegram of complaint to Rudolf Hess, the Deputy Fuhrer, asking him to halt distribution of the issue. He also initiated proceedings against Der Stürmer before the Supreme Party Court. The editorial staff apologized, saying that they had not intended to attack the Kapfing line of the Spretis, to which Cajetan von Spreti belonged, and subsequently published a retraction.

== Involvement in the forced labor program ==
In addition to his SA activities, Spreti at the end of the 1930s obtained a position in the Reich Ministry of Labor with the rank of Regierungsrat (government councilor) as head of the employment office in Kempten, and later in Freising. In 1941, following the German invasion of the Soviet Union, Spreti was ordered to the Reichskommissariat Ukraine. There he led the Einsatzstab (operations staff) of the Werbekommission (recruitment commission) in the Uman Gebiet (area), and was responsible for recruiting laborers for the German war economy from the native Ukrainian population. Spreti had no illusions about the true nature of this mission, saying in December 1942: "The time when one could still speak of recruiting workers is long gone … It is understandable that, given the increasing unwillingness of the population … increased measures are also necessary to achieve the goal." Using violent recruitment and deportation measures, including systematically burning down villages, some 44,000 men, women and children were sent to forced labor in Germany. Spreti also took part with the SS in anti-partisan actions to forcibly recruit workers.

== Post-war ==
After the end of the war in 1945, he was taken prisoner. From 1947 onward, he was employed in a machine factory. He was never held accountable for his crimes.
