= Hans Hayn =

German Nazi SA officer (1896–1934)

Führer, SA-Gruppe Sachsen
- In office 1 July 1933 – 30 June 1934

Führer, SA-Untergruppe Mittelschlesien-Süd
- In office 15 December 1932 – 30 June 1933

Chief of Staff, SA-Gruppe Schlesien
- In office 1 June 1931 – 15 December 1932

Führer (acting), SA-Gruppe Schlesien
- In office 1 May 1931 – 1 June 1931

Parliamentary position
- July 1932 – June 1934: Reichstag Deputy

Personal details
- Born: 7 August 1896 Liegnitz, Province of Silesia, Kingdom of Prussia, German Empire
- Died: 30 June 1934 (aged 37) Stadelheim Prison, Munich, Bavaria, Nazi Germany
- Cause of death: Execution by firing squad
- Party: Nazi Party
- Occupation: Retail worker; store proprietor

Military service
- Allegiance: German Empire; Weimar Republic
- Branch/service: Imperial German Army; Freikorps; Black Reichswehr
- Years of service: 1914–1923
- Rank: Leutnant
- Unit: 50th Reserve Field Artillery Regiment
- Battles/wars: World War I Third Silesian uprising Ruhr uprising

Albrecht Johannes "Hans" Hayn (7 August 1896 – 30 June 1934) was a German officer in the Sturmabteilung (SA), the Nazi paramilitary organization, in which he attained the rank of SA-Gruppenführer. He was also a Nazi Party politician who served as a deputy in the Reichstag. A close associate of SA-Stabschef Ernst Röhm, he was murdered by members of the Leibstandarte SS Adolf Hitler during the Night of the Long Knives.

== Early life ==
Hayn was born in Liegnitz (today, Legnica). After attending the local Volksschule and Realschule, he completed a commercial apprenticeship from 1911 to 1914. At the outbreak of the First World War in August 1914, he enlisted as a one-year volunteer in the 50th Reserve Field Artillery Regiment. In 1917, he was commissioned as a Leutnant in the reserves. After the end of the war in November 1918, Hayn returned to civilian life and worked as a commercial employee in Breslau. In 1921, he took part in the fighting in Third Silesian Uprising seeking to return Polish-inhabited territory to Germany as a member of the Selbstschutz militia and the Roßbach Freikorps.

In 1923, after moving to Mönchengladbach in the Ruhr, Hayn was one of the organizers of the armed resistance against the French occupation. Together with Albert Leo Schlageter, he carried out bomb attacks on French railways and military facilities as the leader of a sabotage squad. Schlageter was caught and arrested in April 1923. The following month, he was tried by a French court-martial, sentenced to death and executed by a firing squad. Hayn managed to escape and joined the Black Reichswehr, a secret organization of the Reichswehr. In October 1923, he took part in the Küstrin Putsch, a Black Reichswehr operation aimed at overthrowing the Weimar Republic. He was arrested and tried with 14 co-conspirators in Cottbus between 22 and 27 October 1923, and was sentenced to eight months in prison. After his release, Hayn bought and operated a retail store until 1931.

== Nazi Party and SA career ==
At the beginning of 1930, Hayn joined the Nazi Party (membership number 211,251). As a close friend of Ernst Röhm, Hayn decided to make a career in the Sturmabteilung (SA), the Nazi paramilitary formation, which Röhm headed as SA-Stabschef. Röhm was a known homosexual and he "surrounded himself with youths whom he chose for their physical beauty and overt homosexuality … handsome, fair-haired, blue-eyed, young 'Aryan' men" including Hayn.

Following the Stennes Revolt, a mutiny that broke out on 31 March 1931 by SA formations in Berlin against the Party leadership, Hayn was selected as the acting leader of the Silesian SA Gausturm, replacing the previous commander who had supported the revolt. In June 1931, Edmund Heines took over the leadership of the Silesian SA from Hayn, which at that time was upgraded from a Gausturm to an SA-Gruppe. Hayn was appointed chief of staff of the newly created SA-Gruppe Schlesien and thus, after Heines, the second highest SA official in Silesia. He initially was named in an acting capacity but received a permanent appointment on 14 October 1931. Shortly thereafter, he was promoted to the rank of SA-Oberführer in December 1931.

On 15 December 1932, Hayn was transferred to the field command of Führer of the SA-Untergruppe Mittelschlesien-Süd. The previous leader, Hanns Günther von Obernitz, had fled to Italy to escape arrest for his involvement in a series of terrorist bomb attacks, and the post had fallen vacant. On 1 July 1933, Hayn was appointed as the successor to SA-Gruppenführer Georg von Detten as Führer of the SA-Gruppe Sachsen, commanding all the SA units in the state of Saxony with his headquarters in Dresden. He was also promoted to the rank of SA-Gruppenführer.

In addition to his duties in the SA, Hayn also pursued a political career in the Nazi Party. In the July 1932 parliamentary election, Hayn was elected to the Reichstag as a Nazi deputy from electoral constituency 7 (Breslau) and was reelected in November 1932 and March 1933. At the November 1933 election, he switched to constituency 28 (Dresden–Bautzen) in Saxony, which he would represent until his death the following June.

== Arrest and death ==
On 30 June 1934, Hayn was arrested during the Night of the Long Knives and taken to the Stadelheim prison in Munich. As a close associate of Röhm and the commander of a significant regional command, he was targeted for elimination. That evening, along with other Röhm confidants Edmund Heines, Peter von Heydebreck, Wilhelm Schmid, August Schneidhuber and Hans Erwin Graf von Spreti-Weilbach, he was executed by a firing squad composed of members of the Leibstandarte SS Adolf Hitler under the command of Sepp Dietrich.

== Sources ==
- Höhne, Heinz (1971). The Order of the Death's Head: The Story of Hitler's SS. New York: Ballantine Books. ISBN 0-345-28333-3.
- Information about Hans Hayn in the Reichstag database
- Lepage, Jean-Denis (2016). Hitler's Stormtroopers: The SA, The Nazi's Brownshirts, 1922–1945. Frontline Books. ISBN 978-1-399-07721-7.
- Christine Pieper: Georg von Detten und Hans Hayn. Die sächsischen SA-Gruppenführer und der „Röhm-Putsch“. In: Mike Schmeitzner, Gerhard Naser (Hrsg.): Braune Karrieren. Dresdner Täter und Akteure im Nationalsozialismus. Sandstein, Dresden 2012, pp. 60–65, ISBN 978-3-942-42285-7.
- Stockhorst, Erich (1985). 5000 Köpfe: Wer War Was im 3. Reich. Arndt. ISBN 978-3-887-41116-9.
