= Wilhelm Schepmann =

SA general and politician (1894–1970)

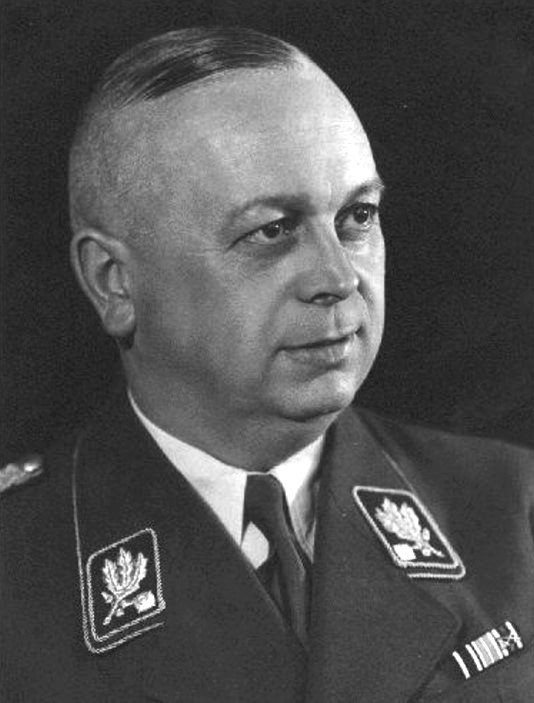
- Schepmann, c. 1938

SA-Stabschef
- In office 18 August 1943 – 8 May 1945

Regierungspräsident Regierungsbezirk Dresden-Bautzen (As Kreishauptmann until January 1939)
- In office 30 March 1936 – 18 August 1943

Personal details
- Born: 17 June 1894 Hattingen, Province of Westphalia, Kingdom of Prussia, German Empire
- Died: 26 July 1970 (aged 76) Gifhorn, Lower Saxony, West Germany
- Party: Nazi Party
- Profession: Schoolteacher
- Civilian awards: Golden Party Badge; Nuremberg Party Day Badge

Military service
- Allegiance: German Empire; Nazi Germany
- Branch/service: Imperial German Army; German Army
- Years of service: 1914–1918; 1939–1940
- Rank: Leutnant; Hauptmann
- Unit: Westphalian Jägerbattalion No.7; Infantry Regiment 56
- Battles/wars: World War I World War II
- Military awards: Iron Cross, 1st class Clasp to the Iron Cross, 2nd class War Merit Cross; Wound Badge

Wilhelm Schepmann (17 June 1894 – 26 July 1970) was a German school teacher who became a Nazi Party official and the last SA-Stabschef (chief of staff) of the original Nazi paramilitary organization, the Sturmabteilung (SA). Schepmann was an SA-Obergruppenführer when he was appointed by Adolf Hitler to succeed Viktor Lutze as SA-Stabschef in 1943. Schepmann lived under an assumed name from Germany's surrender until 1949 when he was discovered and arrested. After denazification proceedings, he was initially convicted of criminal behavior but was acquitted on appeal. He resumed local political activity with a right-wing party and was elected deputy mayor of Gifhorn, but was forced to resign in 1961 following a public outcry.

== Early life ==
Wilhelm Schepmann was born in June 1894 in the German city of Hattingen. After attending the local Volksschule and Gymnasium, Schepmann attended a teacher's college from 1912 to 1914. He served in the First World War from 1914 to 1918 as a soldier of the Westfälisches Jäger-Bataillon Nr. 7 and Infantry Regiment 56, and was deployed on both the western and eastern fronts. During the war, he served as the battalion adjutant, a court officer, a platoon leader and a company commander. He was discharged at the end of the war with the rank of Leutnant of reserves, having received the Iron Cross 2nd class and the Wound Badge in black.

== Peacetime political and SA career ==
Returning to civilian life, he became a Volksschule teacher in Hattingen from 1920 to 1929 and joined the antisemitic Deutschvölkischer Schutz- und Trutzbund from 1920 to 1922. That year, he joined the Nazi Party (NSDAP) and worked as the propaganda leader of the Hattingen Ortsgruppe (local group). As an early Party member, he later would be awarded the Golden Party Badge. He also joined the Party's paramilitary group, the Sturmabteilung (SA), serving as the leader of the Hattingen SA contingent from 1923 to 1927. Together with Viktor Lutze, he organized the formation of the SA in the Ruhr area but was arrested by French authorities in May 1924 for his activities in opposition to the occupation of the Ruhr. After the ban on the Nazi Party was lifted, he rejoined it on 28 December 1925 (membership number 26,762) and by 1928 he was the leader of the SA-Standarte "Ruhr", a Parteiredner (Party orator) and the chairman of the Uschla (Party court) in Gau Ruhr.

Schepmann was unsuccessful in his bid to be elected to the Landtag of Prussia in May 1928. In August 1929, he attended the Nurnberg Party Rally for which he was awarded the Nuremberg Party Day Badge. He was elected to the Hattingen city council in November 1929, served as chairman of the Nazi faction from 1930 to 1933 and contributed significantly to making the city one of the strongholds of the Nazis in the Ruhr area. He became the commander of the SA-Gausturm "Essen" in Bochum in 1930. From 1930 to 1931, he held the posts of Gau organization leader, Gau propaganda leader and special advisor on local political issues in Gau Westphalia-South. In 1931, Schepmann was dismissed from his teaching position with loss of pension rights due to his Nazi activities, and he became a full-time SA functionary as the commander of SA-Untergruppe "Westphalen-Süd". In April 1932, he was elected to the Prussian Landtag and served until its dissolution by the Nazis in October 1933. In November 1932, he was promoted to SA-Gruppenführer and took command of SA-Gruppe "Westfalen" with headquarters in Dortmund.

Following the Nazi seizure of power, Schepmann was appointed police president of Dortmund in February 1933. At the parliamentary election of November 1933, he became a Reichstag deputy from electoral constituency 18 (Westphalia South). He remained in the Reichstag until the fall of the Nazi regime, switching to constituency 28 (Dresden–Bautzen) at the March 1936 election. In October 1933, he was named the special plenipotentiary of the SA Supreme Leadership to the Province of Westphalia. In December, he also received a parallel appointment to the states of Lippe and Schaumburg Lippe. On 15 March 1934, he became the commander of SA-Obergruppe X, in charge of the two SA-Gruppen "Niederrhein" and "Westphalia".

Schepmann survived the SA purge known as the Night of the Long Knives (30 June to 2 July 1934) when many of the senior SA commanders were killed. When the SA Obergruppen were disbanded, he was transferred to the command of SA-Gruppe "Sachsen" on 10 July 1934 to succeed SA-Gruppenführer Hans Hayn who had been murdered during the purge. The Gauleiter of Gau Westphalia-South, Josef Wagner, brought Schepmann up on charges before the Supreme Party Court. He was charged with involvement in planning the purported SA coup that served as the pretense for the purge, but was exonerated on 10 April 1935 and retained his SA command in Saxony until August 1943. On 30 March 1936, Schepmann was given the additional government position of acting Kreishauptmann (district captain) of the Kreishauptmannschaft Dresden-Bautzen and received the permanent appointment on 1 June. On 1 January 1939, his title was changed to Regierungspräsident and he continued to lead the district government until August 1943. On 9 November 1936, he was promoted to SA-Obergruppenführer.

== Wartime military service ==
With the outbreak of the Second World War in September 1939, Schepmann was activated for military service as an Hauptmann with the German Army in 1939–1940. He served as a company commander, an orderly officer and a regimental adjutant. He was awarded the Clasp to the Iron Cross, 2nd class, and the Iron Cross, 1st class, for his part in the breakthrough on the Maginot Line during the Battle of France.

== SA-Stabschef ==
Schepmann as Stabschef, c. 1943

After SA-Stabschef Viktor Lutze died from injuries sustained in a car crash on 2 May 1943, Max Jüttner took over in an interim capacity. On 18 August 1943, Schepmann was entrusted with the leadership of the SA, although his promotion was not supported by all Party leaders. His formal appointment as SA-Stabschef was confirmed on 9 November 1943. However, by then the SA had been thoroughly marginalized as far as political power in Nazi Germany was concerned. Schepmann began working to restore the morale and the prestige of the SA. Since January 1939, the role of the SA was officially mandated as a training school for the German armed forces with the establishment of the SA Wehrmannschaften (SA defense units). During the war, the SA lost most of its remaining members to military service in the Wehrmacht.

Schepmann planned to establish a "Waffen-SA" unit composed exclusively of SA men to complement Heinrich Himmler's Waffen-SS. This projected SA combat unit never became a reality, likely due to Himmler's opposition. Schepmann did manage to have units in the army (Panzerkorps Feldherrnhalle), Kriegsmarine, and Luftwaffe (Jagdgeschwader 6 Horst Wessel), and even a Waffen-SS division (18. SS Freiwilligen-Panzergrenadier-Division Horst Wessel), given SA honour titles. On 26 September 1944, Schepmann was appointed inspector for Volkssturm Marksmanship Training (Inspekteur der Schießausbildung im Deutschen Volkssturm). As the war situation became more dire and the enemy forces penetrated the Reich, the remaining stormtroopers were mobilized to coordinate national defense from within, and the SA rank and file provided the nucleus for many Volksturm units. Schepmann maintained his positions until the end of the war in Europe, when Nazi Germany was defeated and surrendered.

== Post-war life ==
After the end of the war in Europe, Schepmann lived under an assumed name ("Schuhmacher") in Gifhorn and worked as a material manager in the district hospital. In April 1949, he was recognized and arrested by the British Secret Intelligence Service. Turned over to the German authorities, he was tried before a Dortmund jury for his actions as the police president during the violent Nazi takeover in that city. He was sentenced to nine months imprisonment but this was overturned on appeal in 1954. A subsequent denazification process in Lüneburg classified him as exonerated (category V) in April 1952.

Schepmann wanted to pursue his previous work as a teacher, but this was refused by the Lower Saxony Ministry of Education. He became involved with the All-German Bloc/League of Expellees and Deprived of Rights (BHE), a right-wing political party. In 1952, Schepmann was elected to the municipal council and to the district council via the BHE electoral list in the Gifhorn district of West Germany. In 1956, he became deputy mayor of Gifhorn. However, his re-election in 1961 resulted in a public outcry and he resigned from office on 17 May. Schepmman died on 26 July 1970 in Gifhorn.

He was the father of Richard Schepmann, head of the neo-Nazi publishing house Teut-Verlag, who was jailed in 1983 for inciting racial hatred.

== SA ranks ==
SA ranks
Date	Rank
1931	SA-Oberführer
1 November 1932	SA-Gruppenführer
9 November 1936	SA-Obergruppenführer
18 August 1943	SA-Stabschef

== Decorations and awards ==
- 1914 Iron Cross 2nd class
- Kreuz für treue Dienste (Schaumburg-Lippe), 1917
- 1918 Wound Badge in Black, 1918
- Nuremberg Party Day Badge, 1929
- Honour Chevron for the Old Guard, February 1934
- The Honour Cross of the World War 1914/1918 with Swords, 1934
- Anschluss Medal, 1938
- Sudetenland Medal, 1939
- 1939 Clasp to the Iron Cross 2nd Class, 1940
- 1939 Iron Cross 1st Class, 1940

Military offices
Preceded by Viktor Lutze	Stabschef SA; 1943–1945	Succeeded by Disbanded
