= Peter von Heydebreck =

German soldier and SA general (1889–1934)

Führer, SA-Gruppe Pomerania
- In office 15 September 1933 – 30 June 1934

Legislative positions
- 1933–1934: Reichstag Deputy
- 1924: Reichstag Deputy

Personal details
- Born: Hans-Adam Otto von Heydebreck; 1 July 1889 Köslin, Kingdom of Prussia, German Empire
- Died: 30 June 1934 (aged 44) Munich, Bavaria, Nazi Germany
- Cause of death: Execution by firing squad
- Party: Nazi Party
- Other political affiliations: German Völkisch Freedom Party; National Socialist Freedom Movement

Military service
- Allegiance: German Empire
- Branch/service: Royal Prussian Army; Freikorps
- Years of service: 1908–1923
- Rank: Hauptmann
- Battles/wars: World War I Third Silesian Uprising
- Awards: Wound Badge

Hans-Adam Otto von Heydebreck, commonly known as Peter von Heydebreck (1 July 1889 Köslin – 30 June 1934) was a German military officer in the First World War, a Freikorps commander and a Sturmabteilung (SA) general. He was also a Nazi Party member who was elected to the Reichstag, and who was murdered during the Night of the Long Knives.

== Early life and military career ==
Heydebreck was born the son of a Prussian Generalmajor in Köslin (today, Koszalin). Intended for a military career, he attended military cadet academies in Köslin and the Preußische Hauptkadettenanstalt in Lichterfelde. He was commissioned a Leutnant in the Royal Prussian Army in June 1908 and was assigned to the 6th (2nd Silesian) Jäger Battalion. He fought in the First World War and was severely wounded on 26 September 1914 in the Forest of Argonne, which resulted in the amputation of his left arm. After a long recovery, Heydebreck returned to the front line in the spring of 1916 and, with the rank of Hauptmann, he was deployed as a company and battalion commander at Verdun, in Romania, Italy and on the Somme. Toward the end of the war, he commanded a Jäger cycling battalion on the western front.

Remaining in the military, Heydebreck founded a Freikorps unit from his bicycle battalion that was active in the Third Silesian Uprising. His unit played a crucial role in the reconquest from the Polish defenders of a strategic hill at the Battle of Annaberg in May 1921. Consequently, Heydebreck was acclaimed as the "Hero of Annaberg". He continued to be active with the Freikorps until 1923.

== The Weimar years ==
Heydebreck was elected to the Reichstag at the May 1924 parliamentary election as a candidate on the electoral list of the far-right German Völkisch Freedom Party, and joined the National Socialist Freedom Movement parliamentary faction that included members of the Nazi Party. However, he did not stand for reelection at the following election in December 1924. Heydebreck continued to be active in paramilitary organizations hostile to the Weimar Republic. After Ernst Röhm founded the Frontbann in the spring of 1924 as a front organization for the banned Sturmabteilung (SA), Heydebreck joined the new organization.

Adolf Hitler reestablished the Nazi Party in February 1925, after the ban imposed on it following the failed Beer Hall Putsch was lifted. Heydebreck joined the Party (membership number 20,525) in October 1925 and participated in establishing the district party organization in Upper Silesia. He also joined the re-established SA and he founded the SA in Silesia, recruiting many of his former Freikorps comrades. Röhm took over the leadership of the SA in January 1931 as SA-Stabschef, and Heydebreck was appointed to the staff of the Supreme SA Leadership (OSAF) on 1 April 1932 with the rank of SA-Standartenführer.

== Career in Nazi Germany ==
After the Nazi seizure of power, Heydebreck was transferred from OSAF to the staff of the SA-Obergruppe I in Berlin. Following a reorganization on 1 June 1933, this became SA-Obergruppe III with headquarters in Breslau (today, Wrocław) under Edmund Heines. On 20 August 1933, Heydebreck was promoted to SA-Oberführer. On 15 September 1933, he was given temporary command of SA-Gruppe Pomerania. On 20 April 1934, his appointment was made permanent and he was promoted to SA-Brigadeführer.

At the November 1933 election, Heydebreck again was elected as a deputy to the Reichstag, this time as a Nazi Party member from electoral constituency 6 (Pomerania). On 16 March 1934, the Upper Silesian town of Kandrzin (today, Kędzierzyn-Koźle) was renamed Heydebreck in his honor for his exploits during the Silesian uprising.

=== Arrest and death ===
On the morning of 30 June 1934, Heydebreck was arrested in Munich and taken to the Stadelheim prison together with several other high-ranking SA officers who were gathering for a meeting of the SA leadership. In what has become known as the Night of the Long Knives, Heydebreck was executed that evening by a firing squad from the Leibstandarte SS Adolf Hitler, along with five fellow officers (Hans Hayn, Edmund Heines, Wilhelm Schmid, August Schneidhuber and Hans Erwin Graf von Spreti-Weilbach. Heydebreck was one of the eleven victims named by Hitler in his speech to the Reichstag of 13 July 1934 justifying his actions in ordering the executions.

On 31 October 1934, Heydebreck was posthumously expelled from the SA with effect from 1 July 1934. However, despite his execution and official ostracism, the Nazis did not rename the Silesian town named after him and it continued to be called Heydebreck until it was ceded to Poland following the end of the Second World War. In May 1957, the former SS-Oberst-Gruppenführer Sepp Dietrich was sentenced to 18 months in prison as an accessory to manslaughter due to his role in the firing squad that executed Heydebreck and the others.

== Sturmabteilung ranks ==
Dates of rank
| SA rank | Date |
|---|---|
| SA-Standartenführer | 1 April 1932 |
| SA-Oberführer | 20 August 1933 |
| SA-Brigadeführer | 20 April 1934 |
