= Karl von Spreti =

German diplomat (1907–1970)

Member of the Bundestag; for Kempten
- In office 7 September 1949 – 5 March 1956
- Preceded by: Constituency established
- Succeeded by: Friedrich Winter

Personal details
- Born: Karl Borromäus Maria Heinrich Graf von Spreti; 21 May 1907 Landshut, Germany
- Died: 5 April 1970 (aged 62) Guatemala City, Guatemala
- Cause of death: Homicide
- Party: Christian Social Union
- Other political affiliations: BVP (before 1933)
- Children: 3
- Relatives: Cajetan Graf von Spreti (brother)
- Education: Stella Matutina; TU Munich
- Occupation: Diplomat
- Known for: Assassination victim

Karl Borromäus Maria Heinrich Graf von Spreti (21 May 1907 – 5 April 1970) was a German diplomat. He is best known as the West German Ambassador to Guatemala from 1968 until his assassination in 1970. The story of his assassination by Guatemalan guerillas was depicted in a 1970 book, Why Karl von Spreti Died, by Ryszard Kapuściński.

== Biography ==
Spreti was born in the Kapfing Castle near Landshut to an aristocratic family (his direct ancestor was Leo von Klenze). Like his forefather, Karl von Spreti studied architecture. He also joined the Bavarian People's Party. After his service in the Second World War German Army and a short period in Allied captivity, he settled in Lindau, where he continued his career as an architect and as a local politician for the Christian Social Union in Bavaria.

In 1956, Spreti became West Germany's first ambassador to Luxembourg since the Second World War, and held that post until 1960, when he became the ambassador to Cuba (until 1963), then to Jordan (1963–1965) and to the Dominican Republic (between 1966 and 1968). Finally he was dispatched to Guatemala during the turbulent times of the Guatemalan Civil War. On 31 March 1970 he was kidnapped by Marxist–Leninist FAR guerillas in Guatemala City and was murdered six days later. West Germany immediately severed diplomatic ties with Guatemala. Three days after Spreti's murder, an anti-communist death squad named Mano Blanca retaliated by assassinating the Communist politician César Montenegro Paniagua.

== See also ==
- List of kidnappings
- List of solved missing person cases: 1950–1999

== Further references ==
- Blumenau, Bernhard. The United Nations and Terrorism. Germany, Multilateralism, and Antiterrorism Efforts in the 1970s. Basingstoke: Palgrave Macmillan, 2014, ch. 2. ISBN 978-1-137-39196-4.
- Katrin Neuhaus: Un error de cálculo. El secuestro y asesinato del Embajador Karl Graf von Spreti a la luz de nuevas fuentes documentales. Guatemala, 2018. Ziviler Friedensdienst, GIZ. https://www.ziviler-friedensdienst.org/de/publikation/un-error-de-calculo
