= Bad Wiessee =

- Municipality
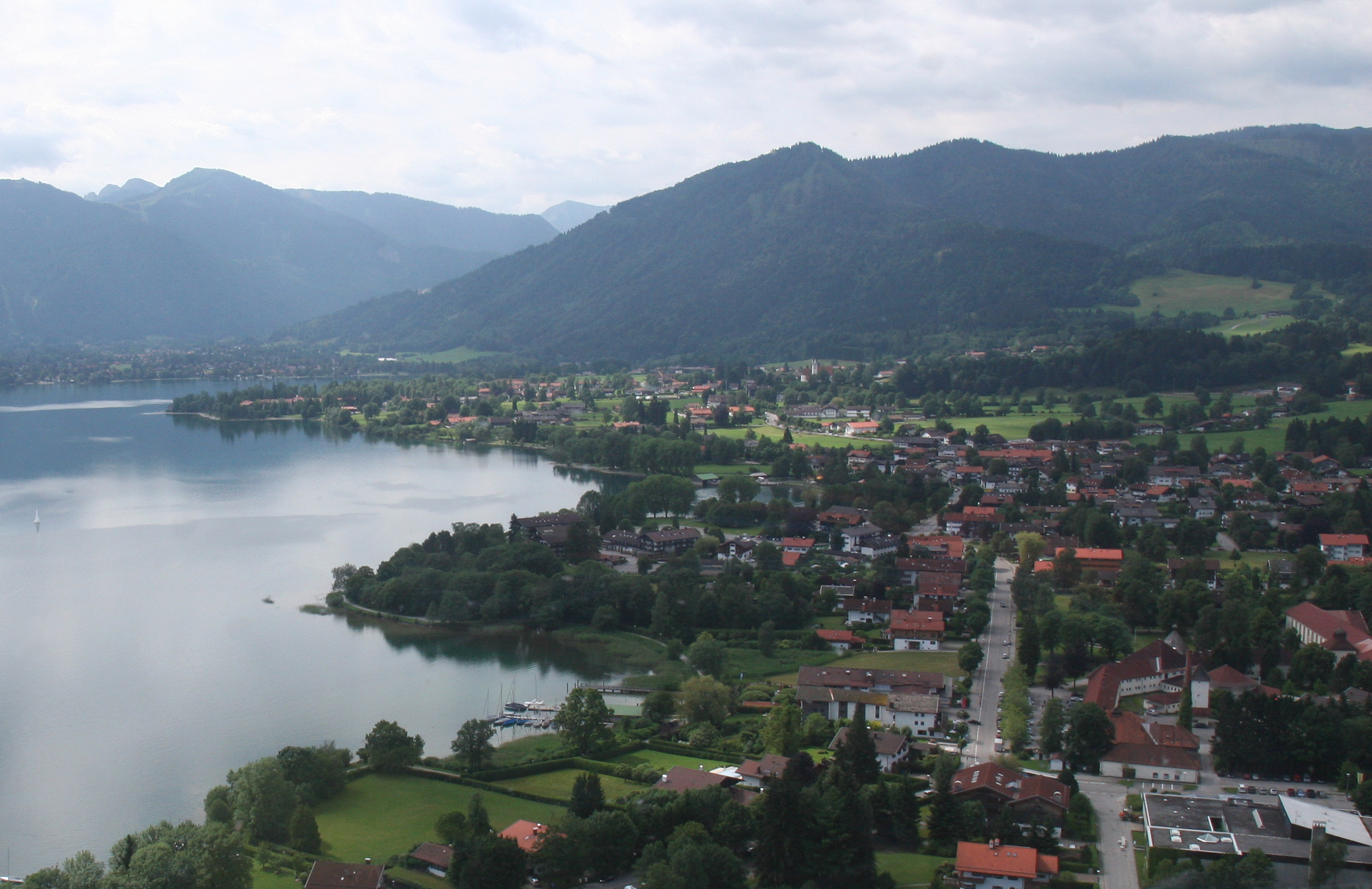
- Bad Wiessee

- Coat of arms

- Location of Bad Wiessee within Miesbach district
- Interactive map of Bad Wiessee
- Location within Germany Location within Bavaria
- Coordinates: 47°43′N 11°43′E
- Country: Germany
- State: Bavaria
- Admin. region: Oberbayern
- District: Miesbach

Government
  - Mayor (2020–26): Robert Kühn (SPD)

Area
  - Total: 32.79 km^{2} (12.66 sq mi)
- Elevation: 740 m (2,430 ft)

Population (2025-12-31)
  - Total: 4,783
  - Density: 145.9/km^{2} (377.8/sq mi)
- Time zone: UTC+01:00 (CET)
  - Summer (DST): UTC+02:00 (CEST)
- Postal codes: 83707
- Dialling codes: 08022
- Vehicle registration: MB
- Website: gemeinde.bad-wiessee.de

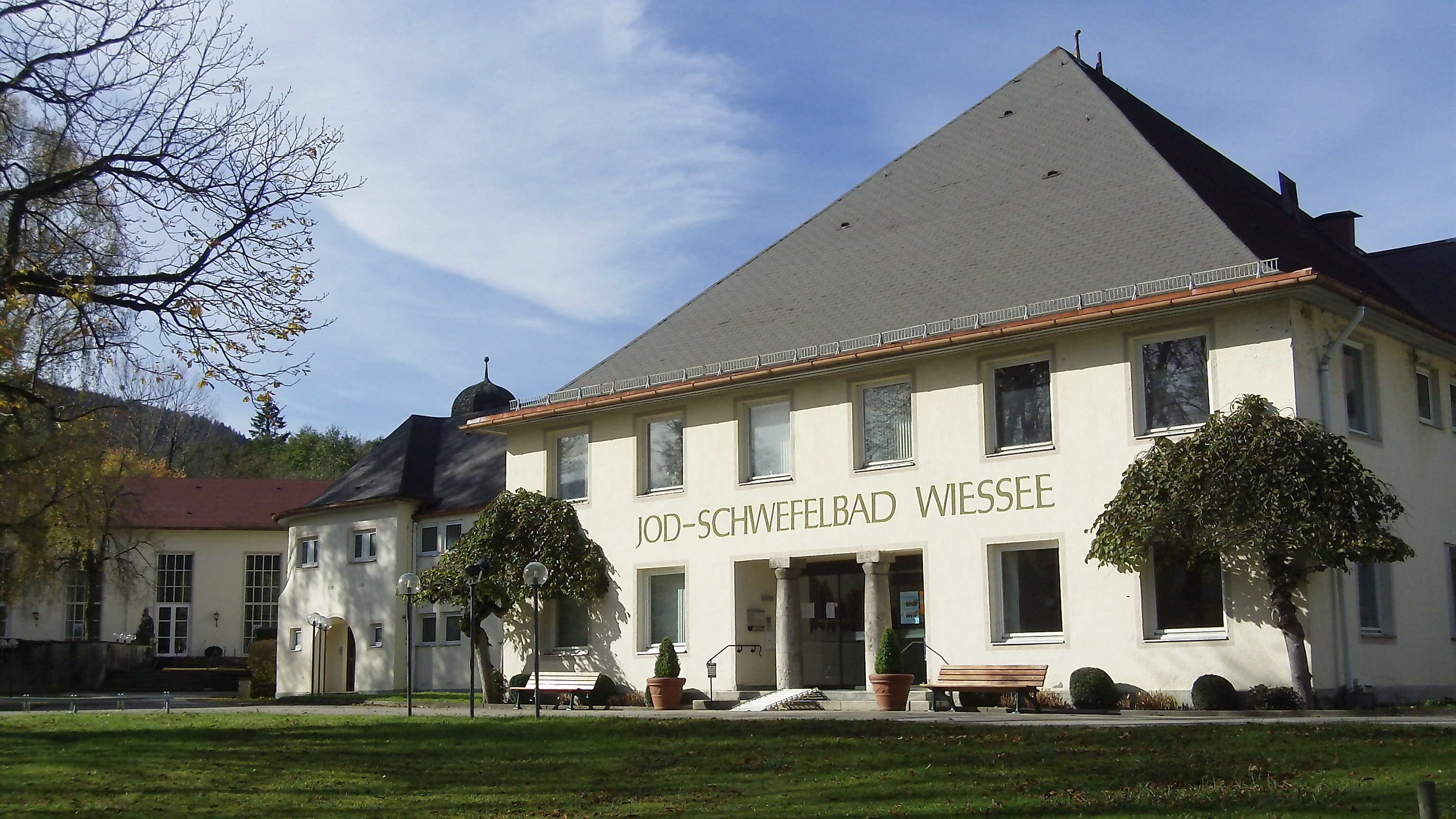
Iodine sulfur bath in Bad Wiessee

Bad Wiessee (Central Bavarian: Bad Wiessä) is a municipality in the district of Miesbach in Upper Bavaria in Germany. Since 1922, it has been a spa town and located on the western shore of the Tegernsee Lake. It had a population of around 4800 inhabitants in 2014. The word "Bad" means "spa" or "baths", while "Wiessee" derives from "Westsee", meaning "western part of the lake". Bad Wiessee was first documented in 1017 in the tax book of the Tegernsee Abbey, encouraged to pay goods to the abbey.

Bad Wiessee is known for its healing sulfur-fountain, discovered by the Dutch oil explorer Adriaan Stoop in 1909 while he was drilling for oil. He built the first iodine sulfur bath in 1912 after oil production had been exhausted. People spend their holidays in Bad Wiessee because of its quiet atmosphere and its location at the north side of the Alps.

Tourism is one of the main sources of income for the population of Bad Wiessee. Although spa tourism has declined in the last decades, Bad Wiessee is still very popular for its casino and with wealthy people, many of them buying a second home or condo to spend their holidays or retirement there. The hotels, shops and restaurants cater for the medium-price-category traveller but traditional B&B and reasonable priced accommodations are still available all year round.

== History ==
Bad Wiessee became notorious as the scene of the key events linked to the Night of the Long Knives, 30 June 1934, when Adolf Hitler and the Schutzstaffel (SS) purged the leadership of the Sturmabteilung (SA), many of whom were staying at the resort, in the Hotel Hanselbauer. The key leaders Ernst Röhm, Gregor Strasser, Anton von Hohberg und Buchwald, Karl Ernst, Edmund Heines and Peter von Heydebreck were arrested and taken to Stadelheim Prison where they were later executed.

From 1939 to 1945, Bad Wiessee was also the retirement home of Field Marshal Werner von Blomberg, who as Minister of Defence/War (1933-1938) had been one of the architects of the German Wehrmacht. Both Blomberg and Field Marshal Albert Kesselring are interred in the Bergfriedhof Cemetery in Bad Wiessee.

Since 2024, the large luxury hotel project 'Seegut' has been under construction on a 3.5-hectare site, which is expected to comprise a total of 170 hotel beds by the time it opens in 2028. At the same time, a new district consisting of 25 individual buildings[1] is also being built there: a pub with a beer garden, an event hall and a cultural barn (for exhibitions and concerts) would be accessible to the public.

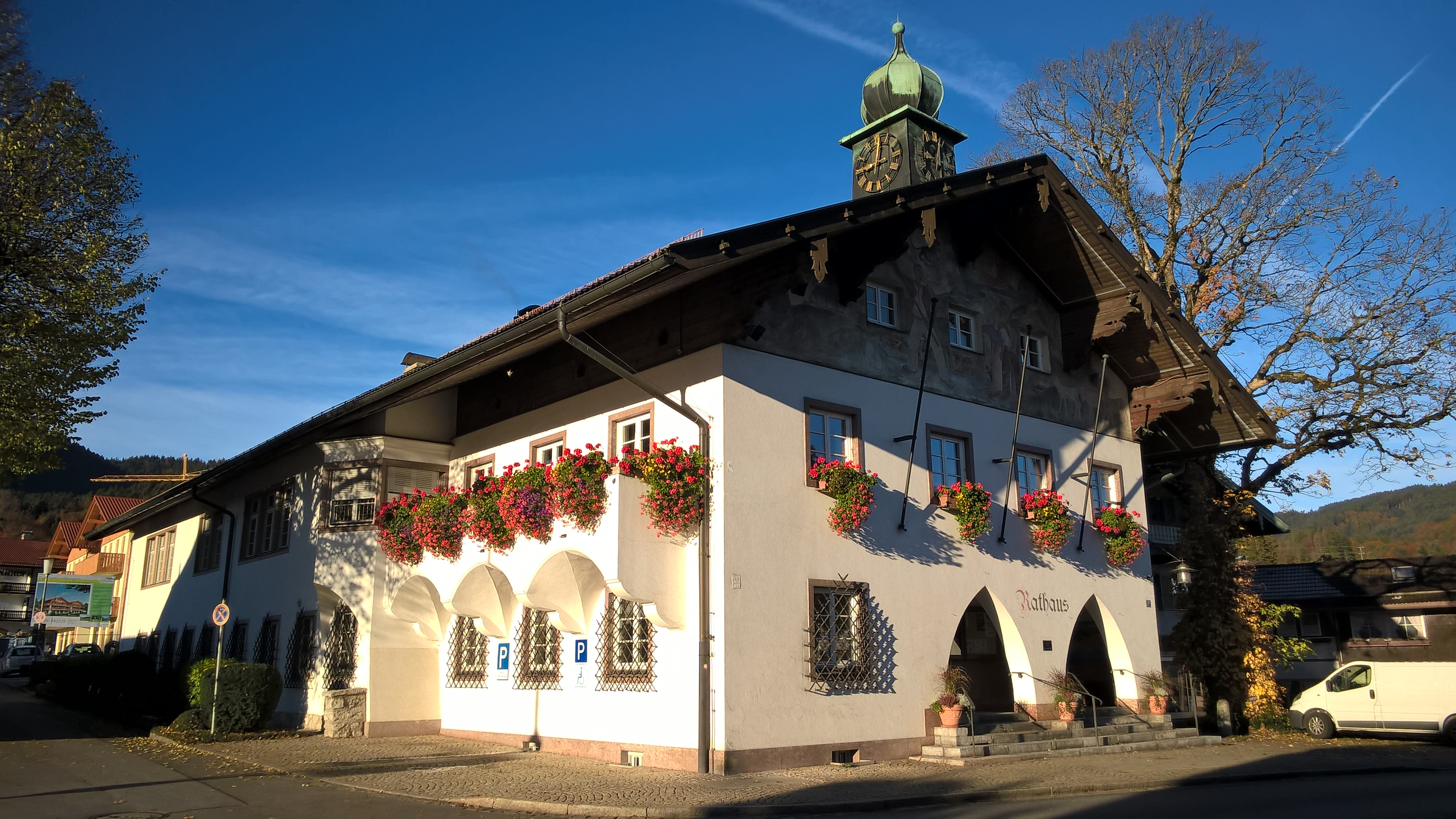
Bad Wiessee Town Hall

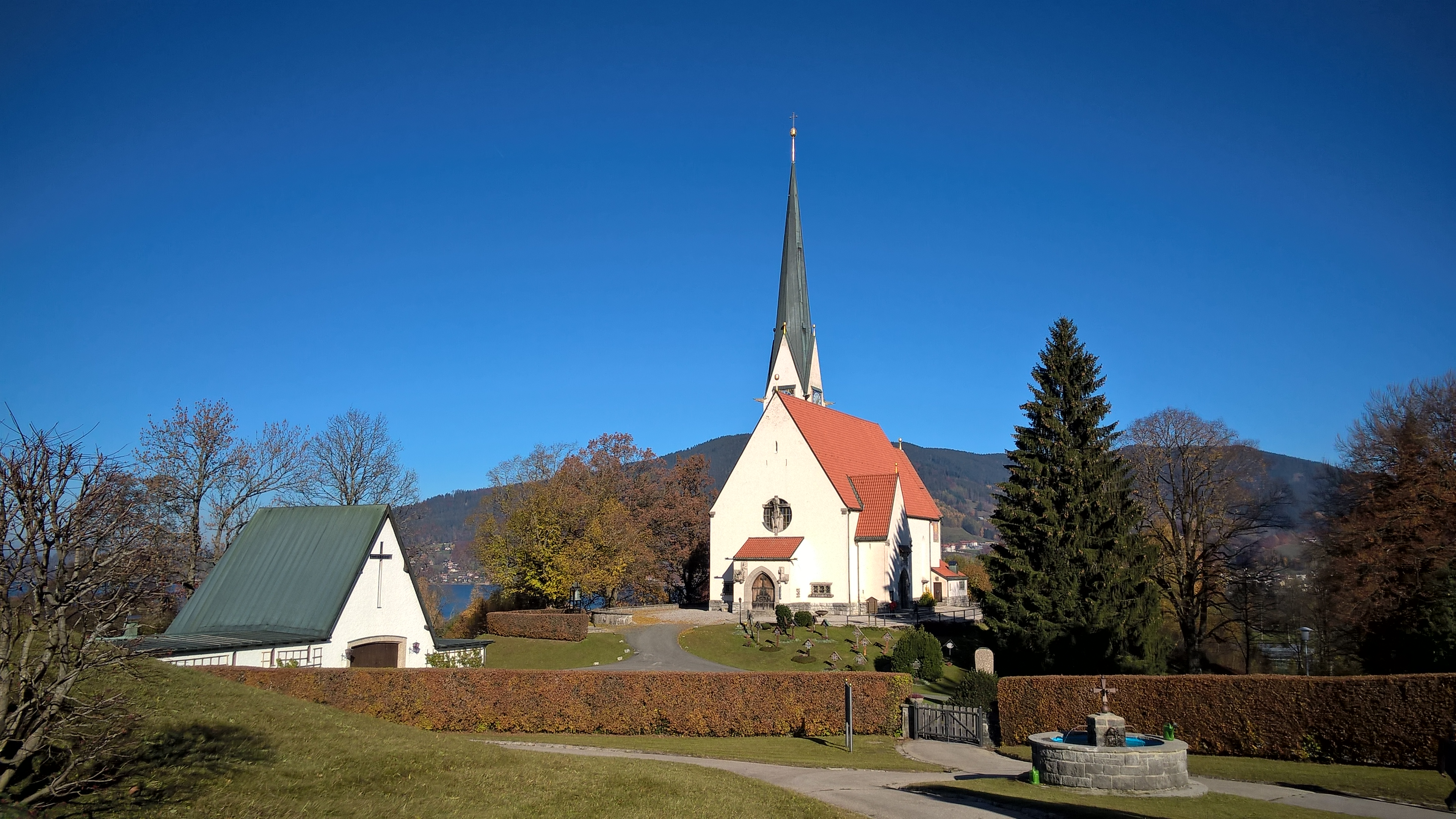
Maria Himmelfahrt Church

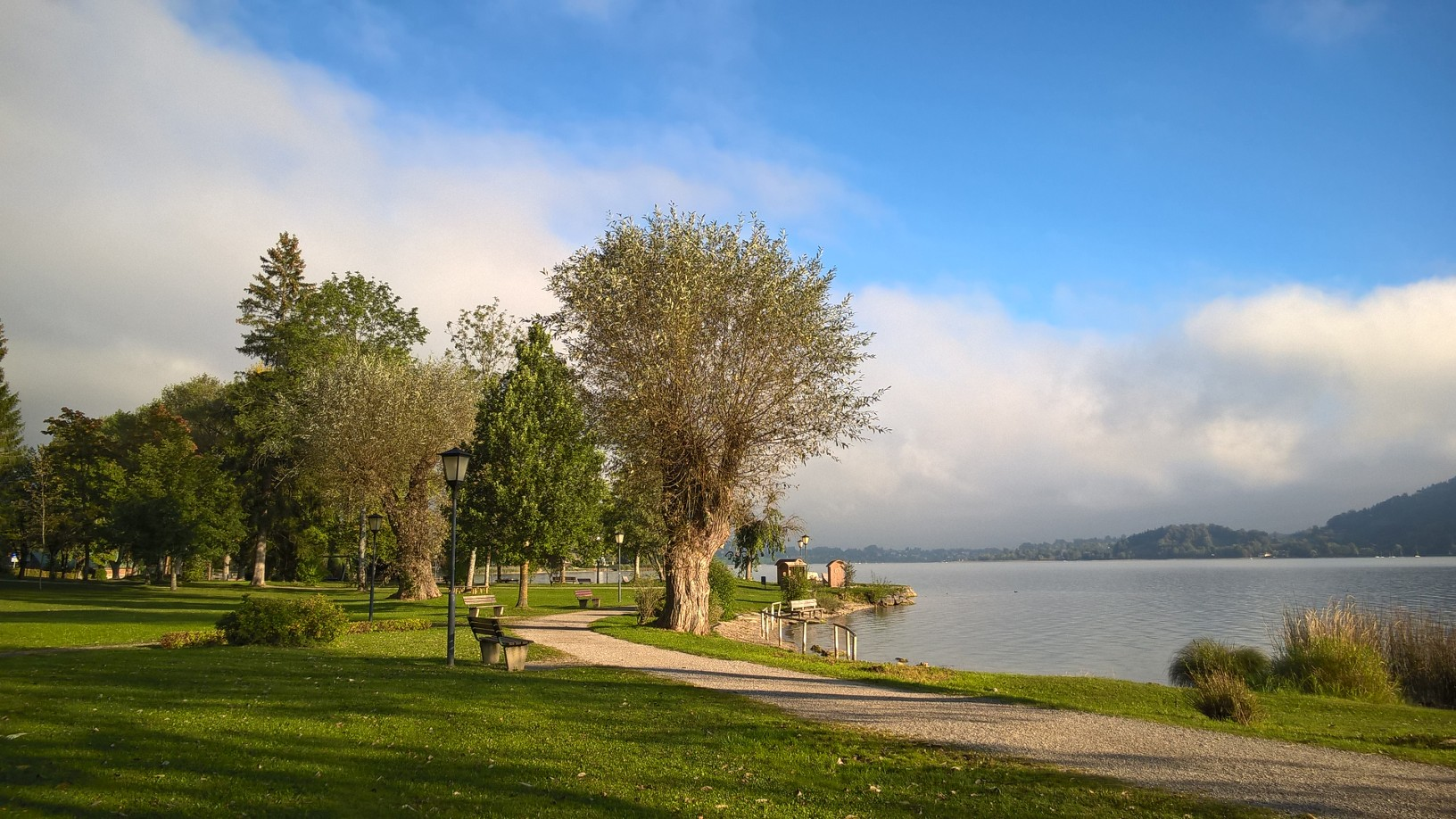
Promenade on the lake Tegernsee

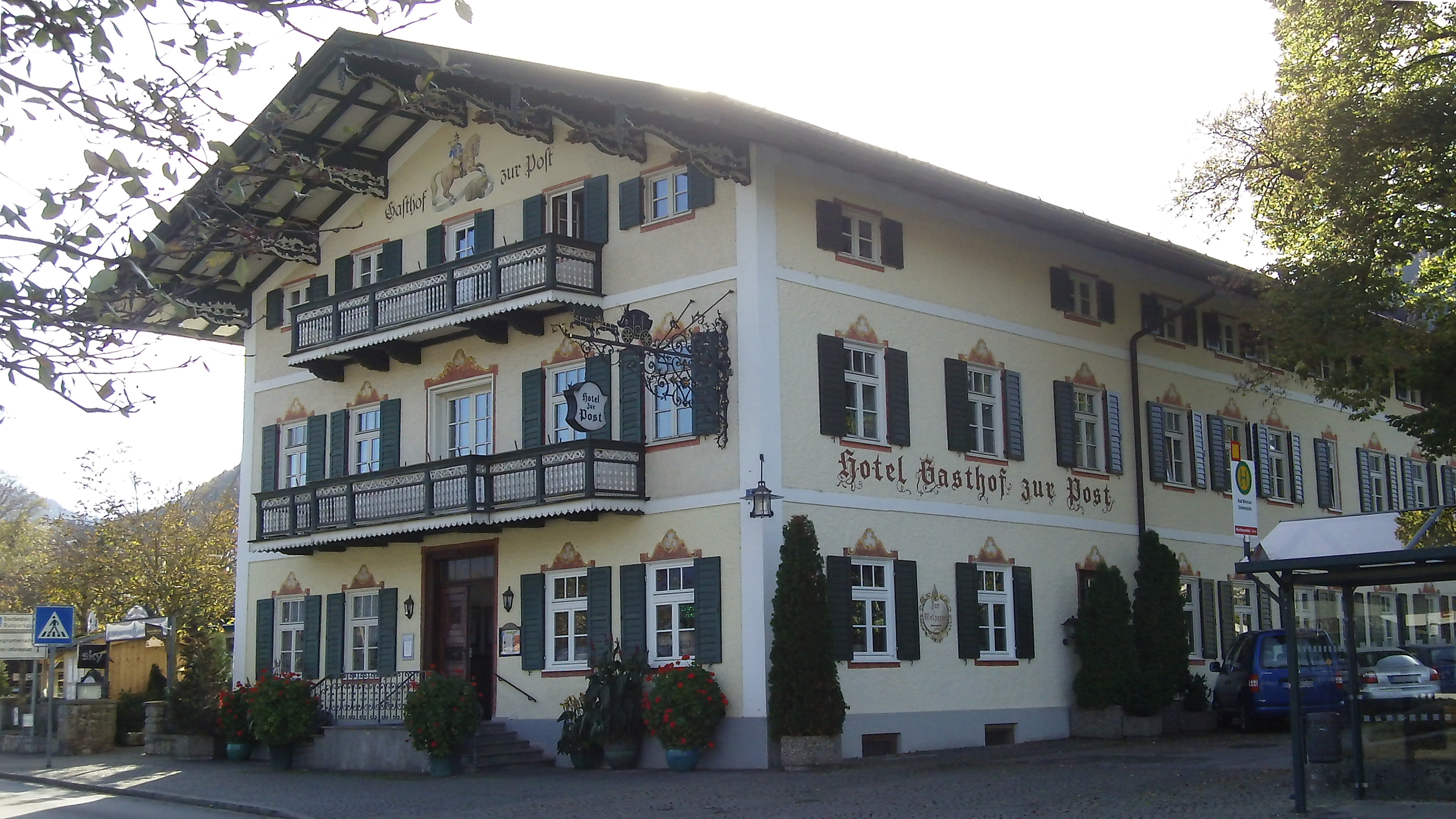
Hotel and inn "zur Post"
