= Gausturm =

Organizational unit of the SA in Nazi Germany

A Gausturm (plural: Gaustürme) was an organizational unit of the SA in Nazi Germany. They were created by Franz Pfeffer von Salomon in the mid-1920s, the Gausturm served as the largest regional SA formations until 1928. There were originally 19 of them, each commanded by an SA-Gauführer who coordinated several SA-Standarten within a defined area.

Under Pfeffer’s plan, Gausturm boundaries were deliberately drawn to avoid coinciding with Nazi Party Gaue, parliamentary districts, state boundaries, or military recruiting zones. This arrangement was intended to ensure the SA’s operational independence from the party apparatus.

The Gaustürme remained the highest-level SA units until a major reorganization in March 1928, when they and the rank of Gauführer were abolished and replaced by larger geographical commands headed by SA-Oberführer.
