= Edmund Heines =

German Nazi politician (1897–1934)

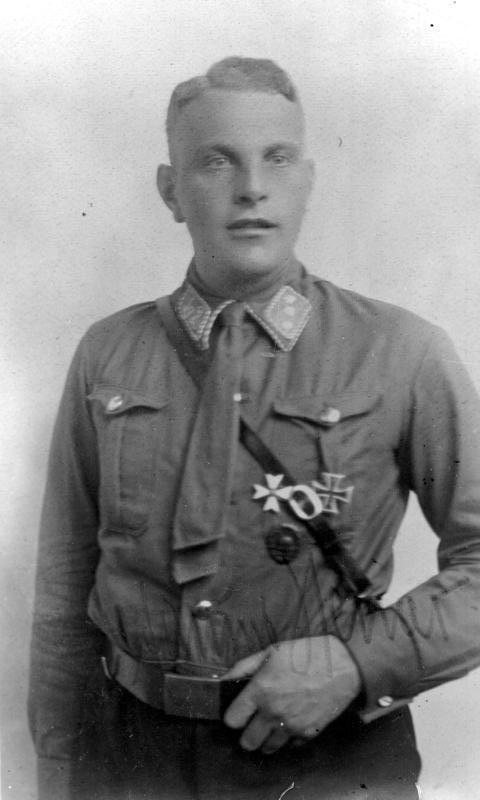
- Heines in 1927

Deputy to SA Stabschef
- In office 1 May 1931 – 30 June 1934
- Preceded by: Position established
- Succeeded by: Position abolished

Polizeipräsident of Breslau
- In office 25 March 1933 – 30 June 1934

Führer, SA-Obergruppe III Führer, SA-Obergruppe VIII
- In office 1 July 1933 – 30 June 1934
- Preceded by: Wolf-Heinrich Graf von Helldorff
- Succeeded by: Position abolished

Deputy Gauleiter of Gau Silesia
- In office Early 1933 – 30 June 1934
- Preceded by: Karl Peschke
- Succeeded by: Walter Gottschalk

Acting Gauleiter of Gau Oberpfalz
- In office June 1930 – November 1930
- Preceded by: Franz Maierhofer
- Succeeded by: Franz Maierhofer

Personal details
- Born: Edmund Heines; 21 July 1897 Munich, Kingdom of Bavaria, German Empire
- Died: 30 June 1934 (aged 36) Stadelheim Prison, Munich, Bavaria, Nazi Germany
- Cause of death: Execution by firing squad (Night of the Long Knives)
- Awards: Iron Cross, 1st Class; Iron Cross, 2nd Class

Military service
- Allegiance: German Empire (1915–1918); Germany (1919–1922)
- Branch: Imperial German Army; Reichsheer (1919–1922)
- Years of service: 1915–1918
- Rank: Leutnant
- Unit: Bavarian Army (1915–1918); Freikorps Roßbach (1919–1922)
- Battles/wars: World War I Silesian Uprisings; Russian Civil War; Kapp Putsch; Ruhr Uprising

Edmund Heines (21 July 1897 – 30 June 1934) was a German Nazi politician and Deputy to Ernst Röhm, the Stabschef of the Sturmabteilung (SA). Heines was one of the earliest members of the Nazi Party and a leading member of the SA in Munich, participating in the Beer Hall Putsch and becoming a notorious enforcer of the party. He held several high-ranking positions in the Nazi administration until he was executed during the Night of the Long Knives in June 1934.

== Early life ==
Edmund Heines was born on 21 July 1897 in Munich, the illegitimate child of Helene Martha Heines and Lieutenant Edmund von Parish, a native of Hamburg from a merchant family for whom she was a nanny. In 1903, Martha Heines gave birth to a second child, Oskar Heines, who is also believed to have been fathered by Parish. In 1915, Heines joined the Bavarian Army to fight in World War I after graduating from his Gymnasium, and fought on the Western Front as a field artillery operator. Heines suffered a serious head wound in late 1915, earned the Iron Cross 1st Class and 2nd Class, and was discharged as a Leutnant in 1918.

== Political career ==
After the war, Heines became involved in the Freikorps movement. From 1919 to December, 1922, Heines served as leader of a unit in Freikorps Roßbach, which fought in West Prussia and the Baltic States under Gerhard Roßbach. In March 1920, Heines participated in the Kapp Putsch, and relocated to the Mecklenburg-Pomerania area after the coup's failure like most participating Freikorps Roßbach members. In July 1920, Heines was involved in the murder of Willi Schmidt, a 20-year-old farm worker who allegedly wanted to reveal hidden arms caches of the Freikorps. Heines returned to Munich following Schmidt's murder, and in 1922 became Führer of the Munich Ortsgruppe, the local Freikorps Roßbach group. In December 1922, Heines became Member #78 of the National Socialist German Workers' Party (NSDAP), and transferred the Ortsgruppe to the Sturmabteilung (SA), the paramilitary wing of the party. Heines was appointed leader of the Second Battalion in the Munich SA Regiment and soon became one of the SA's leading members. In November 1923, Heines was one of two thousand Nazis that participated in the Beer Hall Putsch, being assigned to take the Hotel Vierjahreszeiten. Heines was sentenced to 15 months imprisonment for his part in the failed coup d'etat and was held, together in the same cell with Adolf Hitler, at Landsberg Prison. Heines was released prematurely in September 1924 while the SA and NSDAP were both still banned, taking over the leadership of the Second Battalion of the Munich Frontbann Regiment until 1925 when he joined the re-legalized SA and NSDAP. From 1925 to August 1926, Heines was federal director of the Schilljugend, a right-wing youth organization founded by Gerhard Roßbach now affiliated with the SA and NSDAP. In 1926, Heines enrolled in Erlangen University to study law, and became a Standartenführer of the SA.

On 22 January 1928, Heines was arrested in Schongau for his involvement in Willi Schmidt's murder in 1920, which was exposed during a blackmail attempt. Heines was transferred to Stettin as the main defendant in the trial for Schmidt's murder. The prosecution demanded the death penalty for Schmidt's murder, but the judgement of the Stettin court was 15 years in prison for manslaughter, later lowered to 5 years. On 15 June 1928, the NSDAP deputy Wilhelm Frick referred to Heines's conviction in a Reichstag speech as "Outflow of infernal Jewish hatred of the front spirit, against the spirit of national resistance." On 14 May 1929 Heines was released from custody by a decision of the Stettin court for a "bail" of 5000 Reichsmarks. In 1929, Heines was also convicted of the murder of communist Conrad Pietrzuch, who had been beaten to death by an SA gang led by Heines. The trial had to be reopened due to a technical error, and Heines soon received an amnesty because of his supposedly "patriotic" motive.

Heines held numerous prominent political positions concurrently with his SA positions. From August 1929 to June 1930 he was the SA-Führer of Standarte X in Munich, the Nazi Party headquarters. He was also an Ortsgruppenleiter (Local District Leader) in the Munich Party organization and served as the Adjutant to Gauleiter Adolf Wagner. From May to August 1930 he was the Gau Propaganda Leader in Gau Groß-Munich under Wagner. From June to November 1930, he was additionally appointed as Acting Gauleiter of Gau Oberpfalz, the Upper Palatinate region of Bavaria. Then in November, he became a staff member in the News and Press Department of the Obersten SA-Führung (Supreme SA Leadership) serving there until April 1931. In September 1930, Heines was elected to the Reichstag for electoral constituency 8 (Liegnitz) and remained a Reichstag deputy until his death.

== Deputy to Ernst Röhm ==
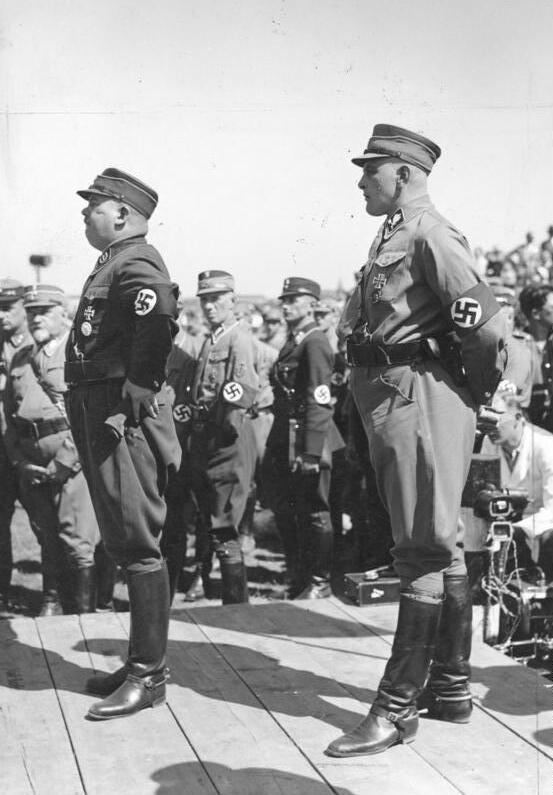
Heines (right) with Ernst Röhm at an event in 1933

On 1 May 1931, Heines was appointed Deputy to SA-Stabschef Ernst Röhm, the effective commander of the SA and a close friend of Hitler. Then in July 1931, Heines also became SA-Führer of SA-Gruppe Silesia. After the Nazi seizure of power, Heines was appointed Polizeipräsident (Police President) in Breslau on 25 March 1933. He was also named Deputy Gauleiter to Helmuth Brückner in Gau Silesia. In addition, he became the Special Plenipotentiary to Silesia of the SA Supreme Leadership. In April, he secured a position on the Prussian State Council until it was dissolved in July, but was reappointed on 14 September to the reconstituted Council formed by Prussian Minister-President Hermann Göring. On 20 April 1933 Heines was promoted to SA-Obergruppenführer. In July 1933 he became SA-Führer of the new SA-Obergruppe III with oversight of three SA Gruppe, namely, Berlin-Brandenburg, Ostmark and Silesia. On 15 March 1934, Silesia was raised to the status of an Obergruppe (VIII) and Heines remained in charge. Now at the height of his power, Heines would hold all these posts until his death.

In early 1933, the establishment of Nazi Germany led to Hitler, now with access to the state apparatus including the Reichswehr, no longer requiring or desiring the street fighting antics of the SA, and seeking to marginalize the organization. Röhm was one of the most powerful men in Nazi Germany as de facto commander of the SA, and considered by Hitler to be one of few people who posed a threat to his leadership. Hitler already had a personal aversion to Heines who, as Röhm's loyal Deputy, was perceived as a threat by extension.

The Brown Book of the Reichstag Fire and Hitler Terror claimed that a clique of homosexual stormtroopers led by Heines set the Reichstag fire; the convicted arsonist Marinus van der Lubbe remained behind and agreed to accept the sole blame because of his desperation for affection; and Röhm's assistant Georg Bell was killed to cover it up. There was no evidence for these claims, and in fact Heines was in Breslau at the time. Nevertheless, the matter was so politically explosive that it was aired at van der Lubbe's trial in Leipzig.

== Death ==
On 30 June 1934, Heines and many other SA leaders were executed shortly after their arrest during the Night of the Long Knives. Hitler identified Heines as one of the principal members of a "small group of elements which were held together through a like disposition" in his Reichstag speech of 13 July 1934. The SS found Heines in bed with an unidentified eighteen-year-old male SA senior troop leader.

Goebbels emphasised this aspect in subsequent Nazi propaganda, justifying the purge as a crackdown on moral turpitude. Heines and five others were executed by a firing squad convened by Sepp Dietrich at Stadelheim Prison. Erich Kempka said in a 1946 interview that Hitler ordered both Heines and his partner taken outside the hotel and shot. In 1957, Dietrich was sentenced to 18 months in prison by a West German court for his role in the executions of Heines and the other men.

Heines's younger brother, Oskar, was an Obersturmbannführer of the SA, and on the morning of 1 July 1934, he heard a radio report concerning the execution of his brother. Soon after, Oskar Heines and SA-Obersturmbannführer Werner Engels, reported to the Polizeipräsidium in Breslau, where they were immediately placed under arrest by SS men. From there, they were driven that night to a forested area near Deutsch-Lissa (now Wrocław-Leśnica, Poland). At dawn on 2 July 1934, the two were shot on orders of SS-Obergruppenführer Udo von Woyrsch.

== Character and attributes ==
Heines had developed a reputation for brutality as an enforcer of the SA, known for personally killing political opponents of the NSDAP despite his high-ranking status. In his diaries, Joseph Goebbels described Heines as "an unbalanced person, full of storm and urge, a child's head", attributing his violent nature to his background. Contemporary sources often pointed out Heines as being unusually tall and powerfully built but with a contradictory youthful, boyish face.

== Awards and decorations ==
- 1914 Iron Cross 2nd Class, 11.03.1916
- 1914 Iron Cross 1st Class, 1916
- Military Merit Order (Bavaria) 3rd Class with Crown and Swords, 11.05.1917
- Military Merit Order (Bavaria) 4th Class with Swords, 05.07.1918
- 1918 Wound Badge, 1918
- Tiwaz (rune), c.1932
- Honour Chevron for the Old Guard, February 1934
