= Ernst Röhm =

German Nazi military officer (1887–1934)

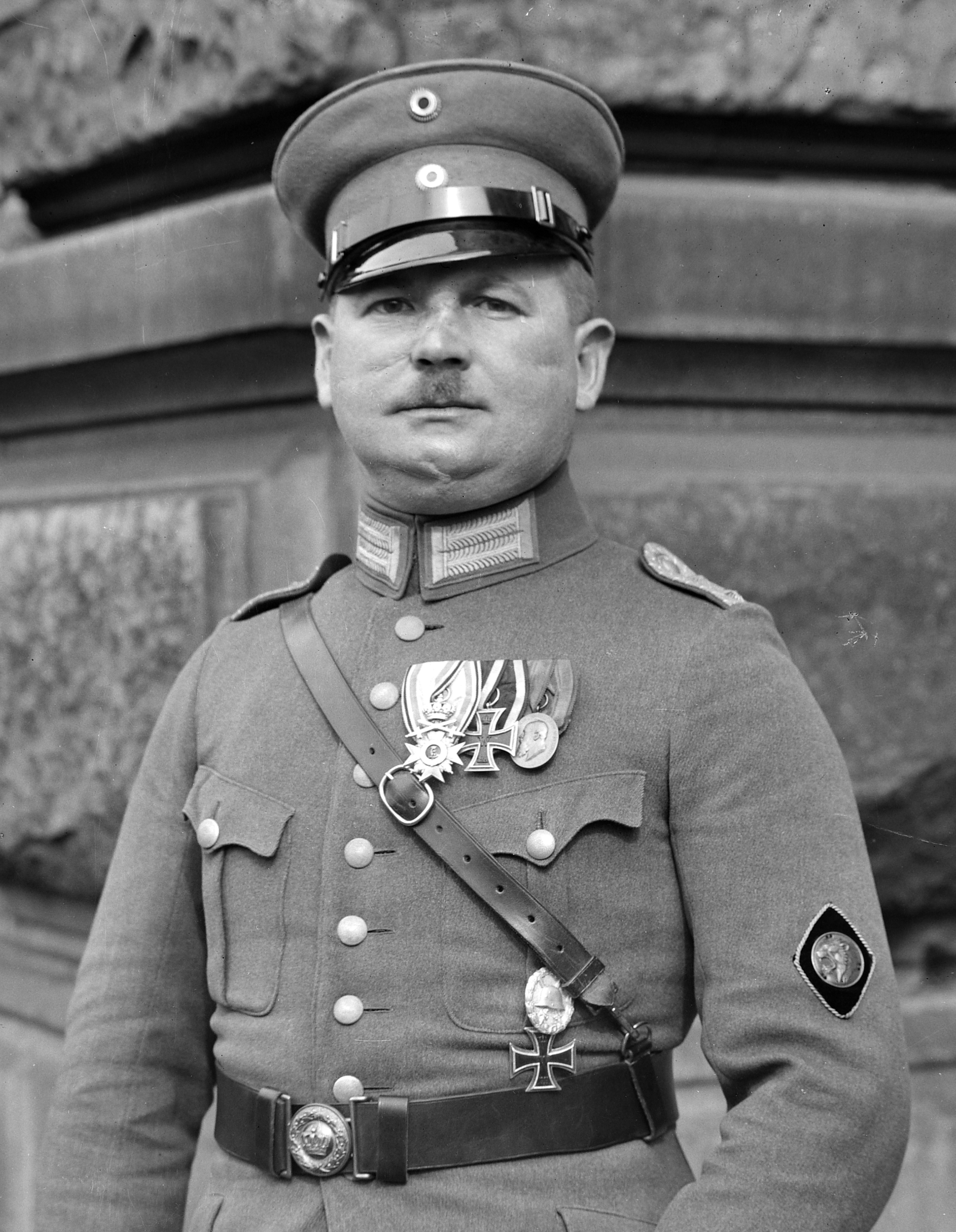
- Röhm in 1924

Stabschef of the Sturmabteilung
- In office 5 January 1931 – 1 July 1934
- Leader: Adolf Hitler (as Oberster SA-Führer)
- Preceded by: Otto Wagener
- Succeeded by: Viktor Lutze

Reichsleiter
- In office 2 June 1933 – 1 July 1934

Additional positions
- 1933–1934: Member of the Reichstag

Personal details
- Born: Ernst Julius Günther Röhm; 28 November 1887 Munich, Kingdom of Bavaria, German Empire
- Died: 1 July 1934 (aged 46) Stadelheim Prison, Bavaria, Germany
- Cause of death: Assassination (gunshot)
- Resting place: Westfriedhof, Munich, Germany
- Party: Nazi Party
- Other political affiliations: German Workers' Party

Military service
- Allegiance: German Empire; Weimar Republic; Bolivia
- Branch/service: Royal Bavarian Army; Freikorps Epp; Reichswehr; Bolivian Army; Sturmabteilung
- Years of service: 1906–1923
- Rank: Hauptmann; Lieutenant colonel (Bolivia); Stabschef (Sturmabteilung)
- Battles/wars: World War I
- Awards: Iron Cross First Class

Ernst Julius Günther Röhm (German: [ɛʁnst ˈʁøːm]; 28 November 1887 – 1 July 1934) was a German military officer, politician, and a leading member of the Nazi Party. A close friend and early ally of Adolf Hitler, Röhm was the co-founder and leader of the Sturmabteilung (SA), the Nazi Party's original paramilitary wing, which played a significant role in Hitler's rise to power. He served as chief of the SA (Stabschef) from 1931 until his assassination by the SS in 1934 during the Night of the Long Knives.

Born in Munich, Röhm joined the Royal Bavarian Army in 1906 and fought in the First World War. He was wounded in action three times and received the Iron Cross First Class. After the war, he continued his military career as a captain in the Reichswehr and provided assistance to Franz Ritter von Epp's Freikorps Epp. In 1919, Röhm joined the German Workers' Party, the precursor of the Nazi Party, and became a close associate of Adolf Hitler. Using his military connections, he helped build up several paramilitary groups in service of Hitler, one of which became the SA. In 1923, he took part in Hitler's failed Beer Hall Putsch to seize governmental power in Munich and was given a suspended prison sentence. After a stint as a Reichstag deputy, Röhm broke with Hitler in 1925 over the future direction of the Nazi Party. He resigned from all positions and emigrated to Bolivia, where he served as an advisor to the Bolivian Army.

In 1930, at Hitler's request, Röhm returned to Germany and was officially appointed chief of staff of the SA in 1931. He reorganised the SA, which at the time numbered over a million members, and continued its campaign of political violence against communists, rival political parties, Jews and other groups deemed hostile to the Nazi agenda. At the same time, opposition to Röhm intensified as his homosexuality gradually became public knowledge. Nevertheless, he retained the trust of Hitler for a time. After Hitler became Chancellor of Germany in 1933, Röhm was named a Reichsleiter, the second highest political rank in the Nazi Party, and appointed to the Reich cabinet as a Reichsminister without portfolio.

As the Nazi government began to consolidate its rule, the tension between Röhm and Hitler escalated. Throughout 1933 and 1934, Röhm alarmed the German conservative elites and powerful industrialists by calling for a "second revolution" focused on socialist economic reforms and wealth redistribution. Additionally, Röhm sought to absorb the traditional German army (the 100,000-man Reichswehr) into his 3-million-strong SA to create a radical "Soldier’s State" (German: Soldatenstaat), with himself as its commander and defense minister—a direct threat to the Reichswehr's autonomy. Hitler thus came to see his long-time ally as a rival and a liability, and in order to secure the backing of the Reichswehr and the traditional establishment, made the decision to eliminate Röhm and his powerful SA allies with the assistance of SS leaders Heinrich Himmler and Reinhard Heydrich. On 30 June 1934, the entire SA leadership were purged by the SS during an event known as the Night of the Long Knives. Röhm, at the Hanselbauer Hotel in Bad Wiessee at the time, was arrested and taken to Stadelheim Prison in Munich, where, after declining an offer to honorably take his own life, he was summarily shot on 1 July 1934.

== Family background ==
Ernst Röhm was born in 1887 in Munich as the youngest of three children – he had an elder sister and brother – of Emilie and Julius Röhm. Ernst Röhm described his father Julius, a railway official, as strict, but once Julius realized that his son responded better without exhortation, he allowed him significant freedom to pursue his interests.

In 1906, Röhm entered the Royal Bavarian 10th Infantry Regiment, "King Ludwig" at Ingolstadt as a cadet, even though his family had no military tradition. He was commissioned as a lieutenant on 12 March 1908.

== Career ==
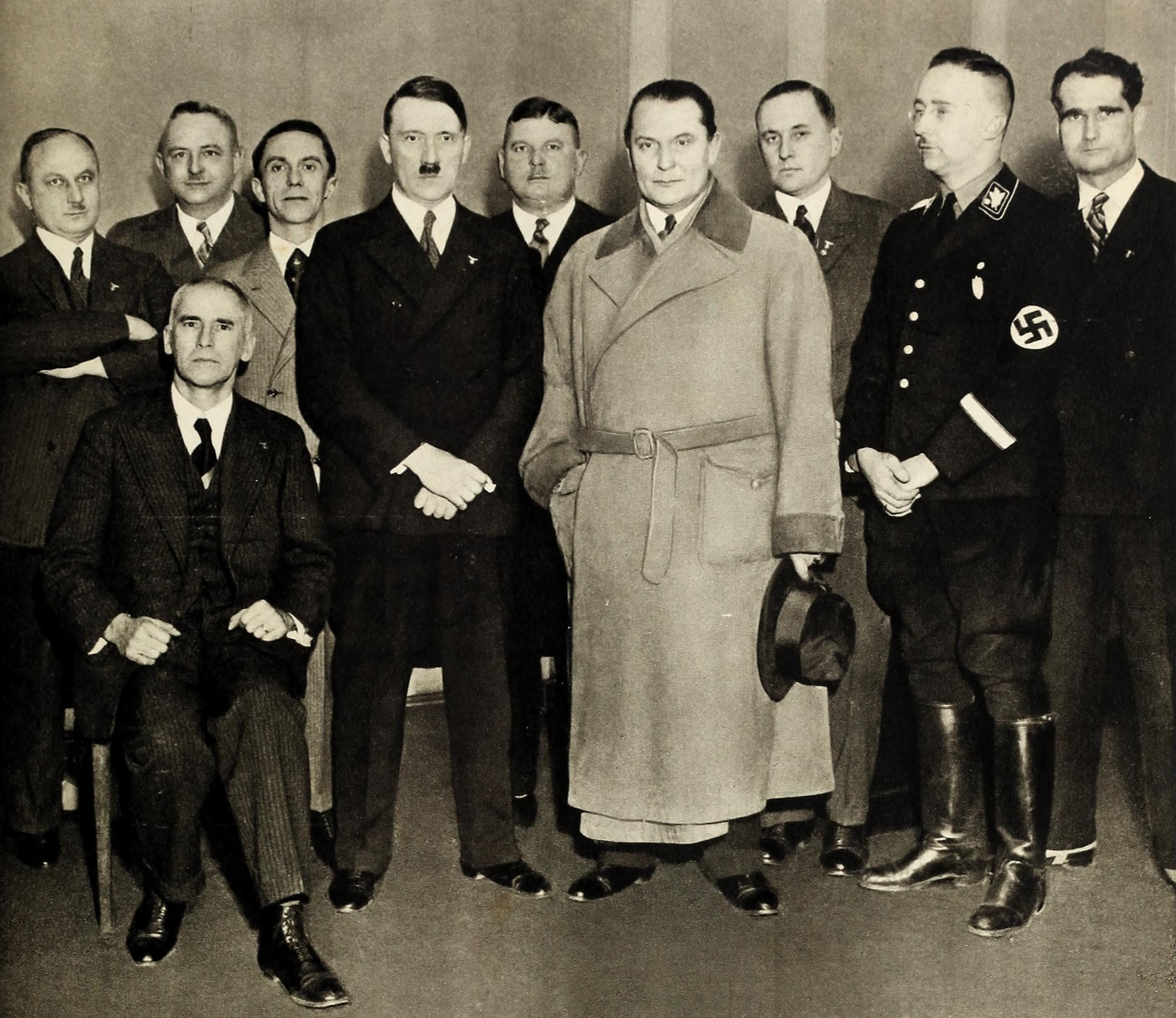
Röhm, standing fifth from left between Hitler and Hermann Göring, pictured as a member of "the staff of the Führer taken on the day of his appointment as Reich Chancellor" on 30 January 1933

At the outbreak of World War I in August 1914, he was adjutant of the 1st Battalion, 10th Infantry Regiment. The following month, he was seriously wounded in the face at Chanot Wood in Lorraine and carried the scars for the rest of his life. He was promoted to first lieutenant (Oberleutnant) in April 1915. During an attack on the fortification at Thiaumont, Verdun, on 23 June 1916, he sustained a serious chest wound and spent the remainder of the war in France and Romania as a staff officer. He was awarded the Iron Cross First Class before being wounded at Verdun, and was promoted to captain (Hauptmann) in April 1917. Among his comrades, Röhm was considered a "fanatical, simple-minded swashbuckler" who frequently displayed contempt for danger. In his memoirs, Röhm reported that during the autumn of 1918, he contracted the deadly Spanish influenza and was not expected to live, but recovered after a lengthy convalescence.

Following the Armistice of 11 November 1918 that ended the war, Röhm continued his military career as a captain in the Reichswehr. He was one of the senior members in Franz Ritter von Epp's Freikorps Epp (also called the Bayerisches Schützenkorps), formed in Ohrdruf in April 1919, which finally overturned the Munich Soviet Republic by force of arms on 3 May 1919. In 1919 he joined the German Workers' Party (DAP), which the following year became the National Socialist German Workers Party (NSDAP). His membership number was 623. Not long afterward, he met Adolf Hitler, and they became political allies and close friends. Throughout the early 1920s, Röhm remained an important intermediary between Germany's right-wing paramilitary organizations and the Reichswehr. Additionally, it was Röhm who persuaded his former army commander, Franz Ritter von Epp, to join the Nazis, an important development, since Epp helped raise the sixty-thousand marks needed to purchase the Nazi periodical, the Völkischer Beobachter. In early 1923, he took part in the establishment of a federation of paramilitary organizations that was titled Arbeitsgemeinschaft and aimed at strengthening the army and combating Marxist influences.

During early September 1923, when the Nazi Party held its "German Day" celebration at Nuremberg, it was Röhm who helped bring together some 100,000 participants drawn from right-wing militant groups, veterans' associations, and other paramilitary formations—which included the Bund Oberland, Reichskriegsflagge, the SA, and the Kampfbund—all of them subordinate to Hitler as "political leader" of the collective alliance. Röhm resigned or retired from the Reichswehr on 26 September 1923.

In November 1923, Röhm led the Reichskriegsflagge militia at the time of the Munich Beer Hall Putsch. (Note: His involvement in such activities was very much in keeping with his persona, as Röhm claimed in his memoir—originally published in 1928—that "War and unrest appeal to me more than the orderly life of your respectable burgher.") He rented the cavernous main hall of the Löwenbräukeller, supposedly for a reunion and festive comradeship. Meanwhile, Hitler and his entourage were at the Bürgerbräukeller. Röhm planned to start the revolution and use the units at his disposal to obtain weapons from secret caches with which to occupy crucial points in the centre of the city. When the call came, he announced to those assembled in the Löwenbräukeller that the Kahr government had been deposed and Hitler had declared a "national revolution" which elicited wild cheering. Röhm then led his force of nearly 2,000 men to the War Ministry, which they occupied for sixteen hours. (Note: Röhm was not involved with the Sturmabteilung until after he returned from a trip to Bolivia, but he did work to create armed militia units. He was deeply involved in hoarding arms and shipping weapons into Austria in defiance of the terms of the Versailles Treaty, but was never caught. See Röhm, Ernst (1928) Die Geschichte eines Hochverräters Munich: Franz Eher Verlag) Once in control of the Reichswehr headquarters, Röhm awaited news, barricaded inside. The subsequent march into the city center led by Hitler, Hermann Göring, and General Erich Ludendorff with banners flying high was ostensibly undertaken to "free" Röhm and his forces.

While crowds cheered, egged on by Gregor Strasser shouting "Heil", Hitler's armed assembly, wearing red swastika armbands, encountered Bavarian State Policemen, who were prepared to counter the Putsch. Around the time the marchers reached the Feldherrnhalle near the city center, shots were fired, scattering the participants. By the end of the gunfire, fourteen Nazis and four policemen had been killed; the putsch had failed and the Nazis' first bid for power had lasted less than twenty-four hours.

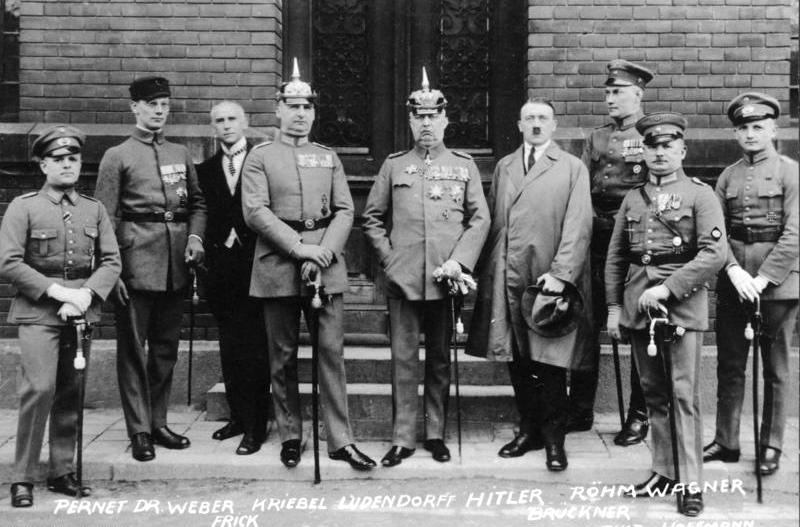
Defendants in the Beer Hall Putsch trial. From left to right: Pernet, Weber, Frick, Kriebel, Ludendorff, Hitler, Bruckner, Röhm, and Wagner.

In February 1924, following the failed putsch, Röhm, Hitler, Ludendorff, Lieutenant Colonel Hermann Kriebel and six others were tried for high treason. Röhm was found guilty and sentenced to fifteen months in prison, but the sentence was suspended and he was placed on probation. Hitler was found guilty and sentenced to five years of fortress confinement, but served only nine months at Landsberg Prison under lenient conditions.

In April 1924, Röhm became a Reichstag deputy for the völkisch National Socialist Freedom Party. He made only one speech, urging the release of Kriebel. In the December 1924 election the seats won by his party were much reduced, and his name was too far down the list to return him to the Reichstag. While Hitler was in prison, Röhm helped to create the Frontbann as a legal alternative to the then-outlawed Sturmabteilung (SA). Hitler did not fully support Röhm's ambitious plans for this organization, which proved problematic. Hitler was distrustful of these paramilitary organizations because competing groups like the Bund Wiking, the Bund Bayern und Reich, and the Blücherbund were all vying for membership and he realized from the failed putsch that these groups could not be legitimated so long as the police and Reichswehr stayed loyal to the government.

When in April 1925 Hitler and Ludendorff disapproved of the proposals under which Röhm was prepared to integrate the 30,000-strong Frontbann into the SA, Röhm resigned from all political groups and military brigades on 1 May 1925. He felt great contempt for the "legalistic" path the party leaders wanted to follow and sought seclusion from public life.

=== Bolivia ===
In 1928, Röhm was recruited by retired Prussian general, Hans Kundt, to serve as a military advisor to the Bolivian Army. The Bolivians were looking for a capable German officer with war experience who, as a military instructor, would play a leading role in the reorganization of the Bolivian army. In addition to army reform, ongoing tensions between Bolivia and Paraguay, which later erupted in the Chaco War, were probably also a reason why the Bolivian government was interested in recruiting German experts.

Röhm signed a contract with a term of service from 1 January 1929 to 31 December 1930, and the German-born Bolivian Chief of General Staff Hans Kundt assured Röhm the rank of lieutenant colonel and a monthly salary of 1,000 Bolivianos, which would give him a high standard of living given the low cost of living in Bolivia.

Röhm arrived in La Paz in January 1929 and began work as a professor at the Bolivian military college so that he could first "learn Spanish." From June to September 1929, Röhm served as a troop inspector, then until August 1930 he was chief of staff of the division command of the Bolivian Army headquartered in Oruro. While some historians claim Röhm played a prominent role in Bolivia in this period, more recent research suggests his role during this period of Bolivian history was relatively minor.

In the autumn of 1930, Röhm received a call from Hitler requesting his return to Germany.

== Sturmabteilung leader ==
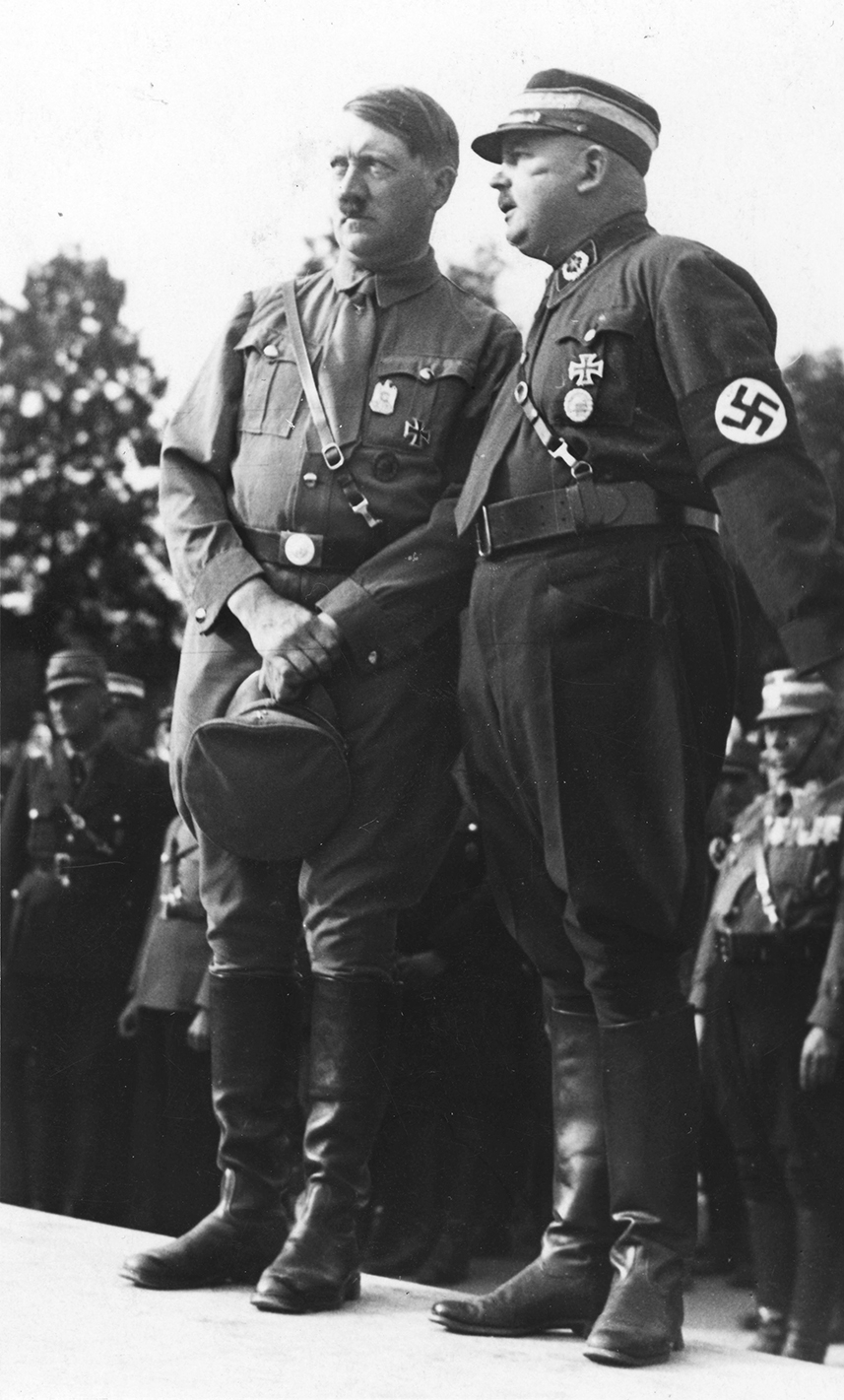
Röhm with Adolf Hitler, August 1933

In September 1930, as a consequence of the Stennes Revolt in Berlin, Hitler assumed supreme command of the SA as its new Oberster SA-Führer. He sent a personal request to Röhm, asking him to return to serve as the SA's Chief of Staff. Röhm accepted this offer and began his new assignment on 5 January 1931. He brought radical new ideas to the SA and appointed several close friends to its senior leadership. Previously, the SA formations were subordinate to the Nazi Party leadership of each Gau. Röhm established new Gruppe, which had no regional Nazi Party oversight. Each Gruppe extended over several regions and was commanded by an SA-Gruppenführer who answered only to Röhm or Hitler.

The SA by this time numbered over a million members. Their initial assignment of protecting Nazi leaders at rallies and assemblies was taken over by the Schutzstaffel (SS) in relation to the top leaders. The SA did continue its street battles against Communists and other rival political parties, and violent actions against Jews and others deemed hostile to the Nazi agenda.

Under Röhm, the SA often took the side of workers in strikes and other labor disputes, attacking strikebreakers and supporting picket lines. SA intimidation contributed to the rise of the Nazis and the violent suppression of rival parties during electoral campaigns, but its reputation for street violence and heavy drinking was a hindrance, as was the rumored homosexuality of Röhm and other SA leaders such as his deputy Edmund Heines. In June 1931, the Münchener Post, a Social Democratic newspaper, began attacking Röhm and the SA regarding homosexuality in its ranks and then in March 1932, the paper obtained and published some private letters of his in which Röhm described himself as "same-sex oriented" (gleichgeschlechtlich). These letters had been confiscated by the Berlin police back in 1931 and subsequently passed along to the journalist Helmuth Klotz.

Hitler was aware of Röhm's homosexuality. Their friendship shows in that Röhm remained one of the few intimates allowed to use the familiar German du (the German familiar form of "you") when conversing with Hitler. Röhm was the only Nazi leader who dared to address Hitler by his first name "Adolf" or his nickname "Adi" rather than "mein Führer". Their close association led to rumours that Hitler himself was homosexual. Unlike many in the Nazi hierarchy, Röhm never fell victim to Hitler's "arresting personality" nor did he come fully under his spell, which made him unique.

As Hitler rose to national power with his appointment as chancellor in January 1933, SA members were appointed auxiliary police and ordered by Göring to sweep aside "all enemies of the state".

=== Second revolution ===
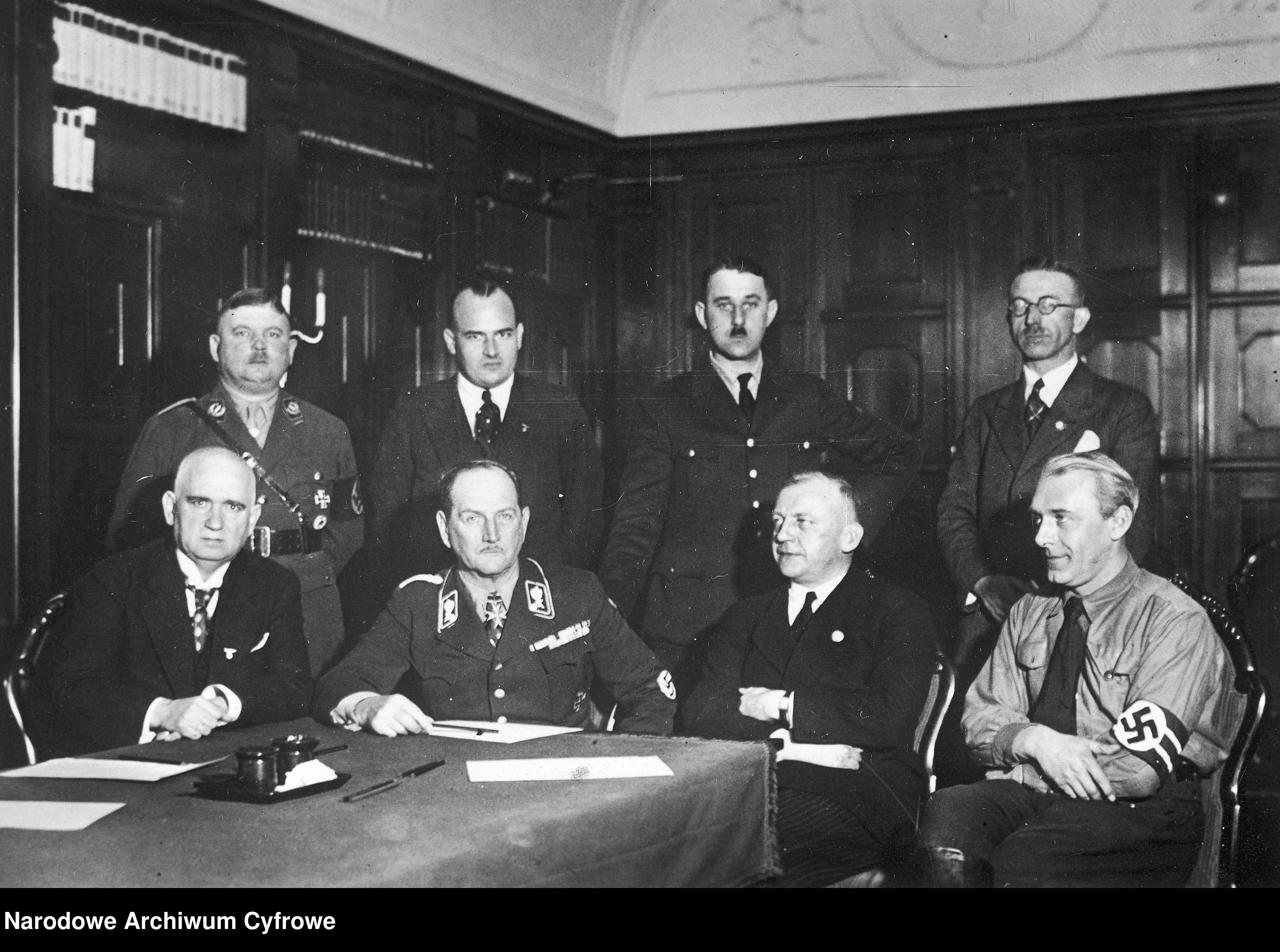
The Nazi controlled Bavarian Commissarial Government of March 1933 (German: Bayerische Kommission, Reichskommissariat für Bayern, Kabinett von Epp). Seated from left Minister of Finance Ludwig Siebert, Prime Minister/Reich Governor of Bavaria Franz von Epp, Minister of the Interior Adolf Wagner, and Minister of Culture Hans Schemm. Standing from left State Commissioner Ernst Röhm, Minister of Justice Hans Frank, Minister of State Hermann Esser, and Minister of Agriculture Georg Luber. Press Photo: National Digital Archives of Poland

Röhm and the SA regarded themselves as the vanguard of the "National Socialist revolution". After Hitler's national takeover they expected radical changes in Germany, including power and rewards for themselves, unaware that, as Chancellor, Hitler no longer needed their street-fighting capabilities.

Nevertheless, Hitler did name Röhm to numerous important Party and State positions. On 2 June 1933, Hitler named him a Reichsleiter, the second highest political rank in the Nazi Party. He was made a member of the Prussian State Council on 14 September and a member of the Academy for German Law on 3 October, advancing to its Leadership Council (Führerrat) in November. On 12 November, Röhm was elected to the Reichstag. Finally, on 2 December 1933, he was named to the Reich cabinet as a Reichsminister without portfolio by a provision in the Law to Secure the Unity of Party and State aimed at interlocking the leadership of the Party and the government. At the same time, he also was made a member of the Reich Defence Council.

Along with other members of the more radical faction within the Nazi Party, Röhm advocated a "second revolution" that was overtly anti-capitalist in its general disposition. These radicals rejected capitalism and they intended to take steps to curb monopolies and promoted the nationalization of land and industry. Such plans were threatening to the business community in general, and to Hitler's corporate financial backers in particular—including many German industrial leaders he would rely upon for arms production. In order to keep from alienating them, Hitler swiftly reassured his powerful industrial allies that there would be no such revolution as espoused by these Party radicals.

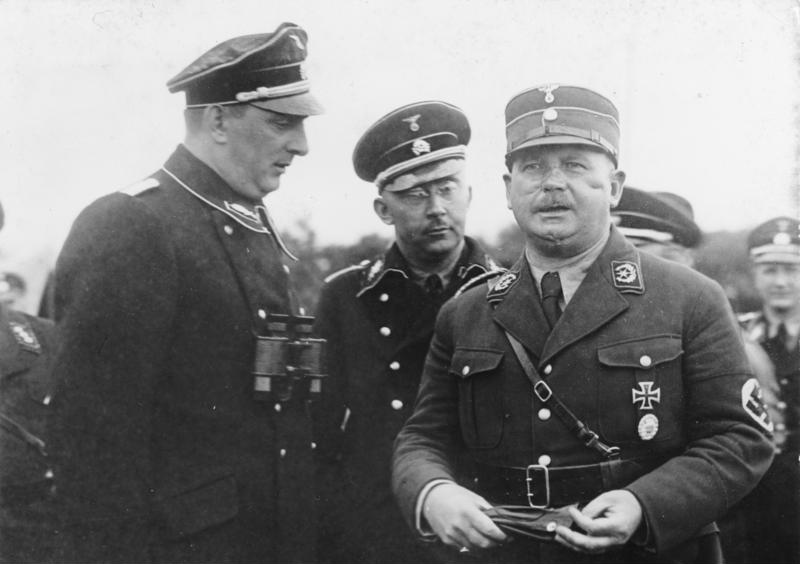
With Orpo Chief Kurt Daluege and SS Chief Heinrich Himmler, in August 1933

Many SA "storm troopers" had working-class origins and longed for a radical transformation of German society. They were disappointed by the new regime's lack of socialistic direction and its failure to provide the lavish patronage they had expected. Furthermore, Röhm and his SA colleagues thought of their force as the core of the future German Army, and saw themselves as replacing the Reichswehr and its established professional officer corps. By then, the SA had swollen to over three million men, dwarfing the Reichswehr, which was limited to 100,000 men by the Treaty of Versailles. Although Röhm had been a member of the officer corps, he viewed them as "old fogies" who lacked "revolutionary spirit". He believed that the Reichswehr should be merged into the SA to form a true "people's army" under his command, a pronouncement that caused significant consternation within the army's hierarchy and convinced them that the SA was a serious threat. At a February 1934 cabinet meeting, Röhm then demanded that the merger be made, under his leadership as Minister of Defence.

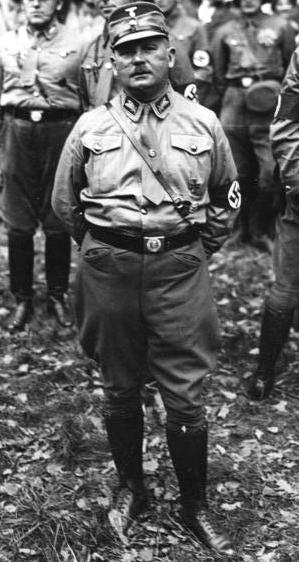
Ernst Röhm in Bavaria in 1931

This horrified the army, with its traditions going back to Frederick the Great. The army officer corps viewed the SA as an "undisciplined mob" of "brawling" street thugs, and was also concerned by the pervasiveness of "corrupt morals" within the ranks of the SA. Reports of a huge cache of weapons in the hands of SA members caused additional concern to the army leadership. Unsurprisingly, the officer corps opposed Röhm's proposal. They insisted that discipline and honour would vanish if the SA gained control, but Röhm and the SA would settle for nothing less. In addition the army leadership was eager to co-operate with Hitler given his plan of re-armament and expansion of the established professional military forces.

In February 1934, Hitler told British diplomat Anthony Eden of his plan to reduce the SA by two-thirds. That same month, Hitler announced that the SA would be left with only a few minor military functions. Röhm responded with complaints, and began expanding the armed elements of the SA. Speculation that the SA was planning a coup against Hitler became widespread in Berlin. In March, Röhm offered a compromise in which "only" a few thousand SA leaders would be taken into the army, but the army promptly rejected that idea.

On 11 April 1934, Hitler met with German military leaders on the ship Deutschland. By that time, he knew President Paul von Hindenburg would likely die before the end of the year. Hitler informed the army hierarchy of Hindenburg's declining health and proposed that the Reichswehr support him as Hindenburg's successor. In exchange, he offered to reduce the SA, suppress Röhm's ambitions, and guarantee the Reichswehr would be Germany's only military force. According to war correspondent William L. Shirer, Hitler also promised to expand the army and navy.

Although determined to curb the power of the SA, Hitler put off doing away with his long-time ally. A political struggle within the party grew, with those closest to Hitler, including Prussian premier Hermann Göring, Propaganda Minister Joseph Goebbels, and Reichsführer-SS Heinrich Himmler, positioning themselves against Röhm. To isolate Röhm, on 20 April 1934, Göring transferred control of the Prussian political police (Gestapo) to Himmler, who he believed could be counted on to move against Röhm.

Both the Reichswehr and the conservative business community continued to complain to Hindenburg about the SA. In early June, defence minister Werner von Blomberg issued an ultimatum to Hitler from Hindenburg: unless Hitler took immediate steps to end the growing tension in Germany, Hindenburg would declare martial law and turn over control of the country to the army. The threat of a declaration of martial law from Hindenburg, the only person in Germany with the authority to potentially depose the Nazi regime, put Hitler under pressure to act. Hitler decided the time had come both to destroy Röhm and to settle scores with old enemies. Both Himmler and Göring welcomed Hitler's decision, since both had much to gain by Röhm's downfall—the independence of the SS for Himmler, and the removal of a rival for Göring.

== Personal life and death ==
Röhm was known to be homosexual, which Hitler tolerated. Röhm was also known for being a good organizer, being a strong leader and having a brutal, unscrupulous manner; all of which served Hitler well politically before the Nazis obtained national power in 1933.

In June 1934, in preparation for the purge known as the Night of the Long Knives, both Himmler and Reinhard Heydrich, chief of the SS Security Service, assembled a dossier of fabricated evidence to suggest that Röhm had been paid 12 million ℛ︁ℳ︁ (equivalent to €57 million 2021) by the government of France to overthrow Hitler. Leading officers in the SS were shown falsified evidence on 24 June that Röhm planned to use the SA to launch a plot against the government (Röhm-Putsch). At Hitler's direction, Göring, Himmler, Heydrich, and Victor Lutze drew up lists of people in and outside the SA to be killed. One of the men Göring recruited to assist him was Willi Lehmann, a Gestapo official and NKVD spy. On 25 June, General Werner von Fritsch placed the Reichswehr on the highest level of alert. On 27 June, Hitler moved to secure the army's cooperation. Blomberg and General Walter von Reichenau, the army's liaison to the party, gave it to him by expelling Röhm from the German Officers' League. On 28 June, Hitler went to Essen to attend Josef Terboven's wedding celebration and reception; from there he called Röhm's adjutant at Bad Wiessee and ordered SA leaders to meet with him on 30 June at 11:00 a.m. On 29 June, a signed article in Völkischer Beobachter by Blomberg appeared in which Blomberg stated with great fervour that the Reichswehr stood behind Hitler.

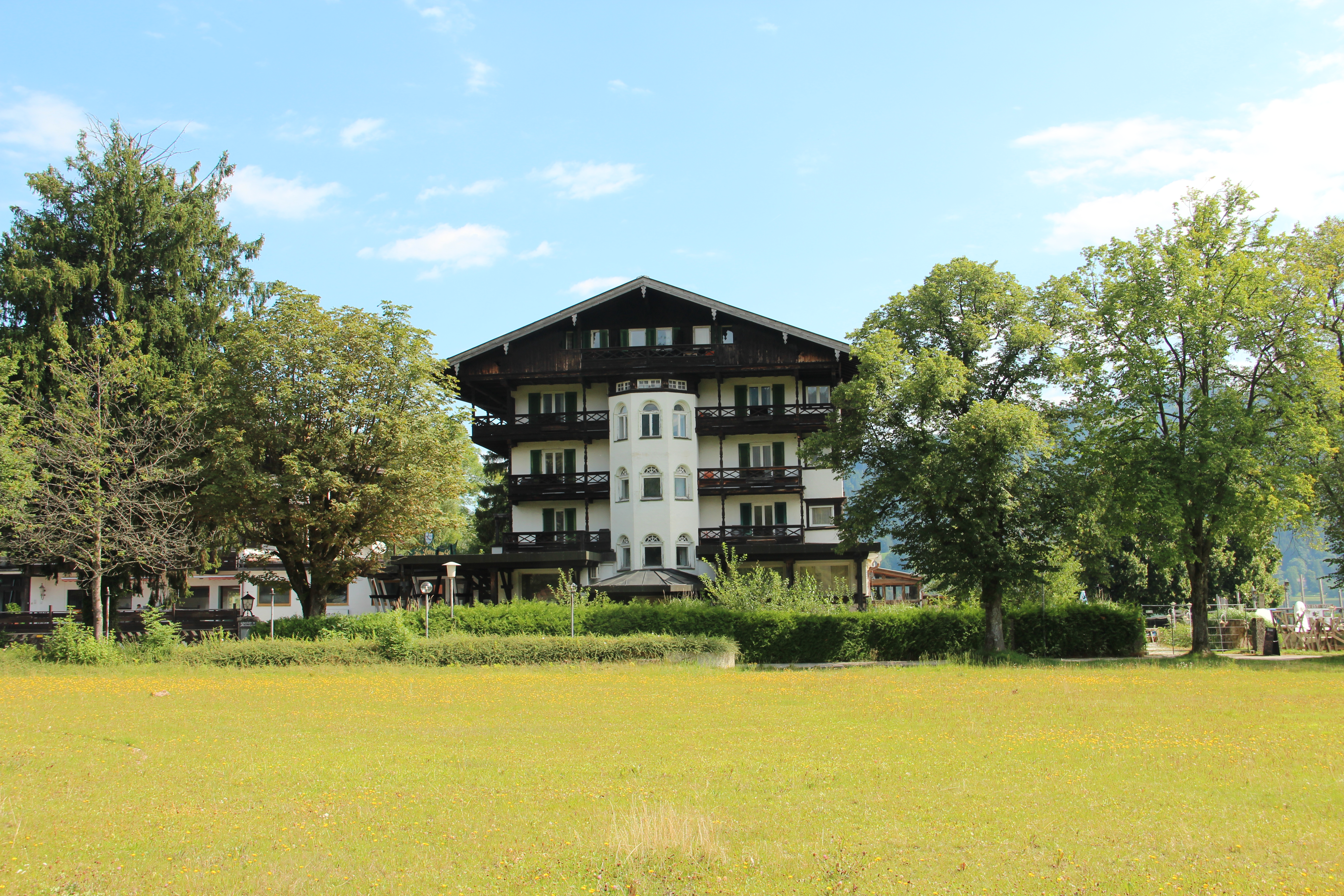
Hotel Lederer am See (former Hanselbauer Hotel) in Bad Wiessee before its planned demolition in 2017

On 30 June 1934, Hitler and a large group of SS and regular police flew to Munich and arrived between 06:00 and 07:00 at Hanselbauer Hotel in Bad Wiessee, where Röhm and his followers were staying. With Hitler's early arrival, the SA leadership, still in bed, were taken by surprise. SS men stormed the hotel and Hitler personally placed Röhm and other high-ranking SA leaders under arrest. According to Erich Kempka, Hitler turned Röhm over to "two detectives holding pistols with the safety catch off". The SS found Breslau SA leader Edmund Heines in bed with an unidentified eighteen-year-old male SA senior troop leader. Goebbels emphasised this aspect in subsequent Nazi propaganda, justifying the purge as a crackdown on moral turpitude. Kempka said in a 1946 interview that Hitler ordered both Heines and his partner taken outside of the hotel and shot. Meanwhile, the SS arrested the other SA leaders as they left their train for the planned meeting with Röhm and Hitler.

Although Hitler presented no evidence of a plot by Röhm to overthrow the regime, he nevertheless denounced the leadership of the SA. Arriving back at party headquarters in Munich, Hitler addressed the assembled crowd. Consumed with rage, Hitler denounced "the worst treachery in world history". Hitler told the crowd that "undisciplined and disobedient characters and asocial or diseased elements" would be annihilated. The crowd, which included party members and many SA members fortunate enough to escape arrest, shouted its approval.

Joseph Goebbels, who had been with Hitler at Bad Wiessee, set the final phase of the plan in motion. Upon returning to Berlin, Goebbels telephoned Göring at 10:00 with the codeword kolibri ("hummingbird") to let loose the execution squads on the rest of their unsuspecting victims. Leibstandarte SS Adolf Hitler commander Sepp Dietrich received orders from Hitler to form an "execution squad" and go to Stadelheim Prison in Munich where Röhm and other SA leaders were being held under arrest. There in the prison courtyard, the Leibstandarte firing squad shot five SA generals and an SA colonel. Several of those not immediately executed were taken back to the Leibstandarte barracks at Lichterfelde, given one-minute "trials", and shot by a firing squad. Röhm himself, however, was kept prisoner.

Hitler was hesitant in authorising Röhm's execution, perhaps because of loyalty or embarrassment about the execution of an important lieutenant; he eventually did so, and agreed that Röhm should have the option of suicide. On 1 July 1934, SS-Brigadeführer Theodor Eicke (later commandant of the Dachau concentration camp) and SS-Obersturmbannführer Michael Lippert visited Röhm. Once inside Röhm's cell, they handed him a Browning pistol loaded with a single cartridge and told him he had ten minutes to kill himself or they would do it for him. Röhm demurred, telling them, "If I am to be killed, let Adolf do it himself." Having heard nothing in the allotted time, Eicke and Lippert returned to Röhm's cell at 14:50 to find him standing, with his bare chest puffed out in a gesture of defiance. Eicke and Lippert then shot and killed Röhm. (Note: Röhm was buried in the Westfriedhof ("Western Cemetery") in Munich. In 1957, the German authorities tried Lippert in Munich for Röhm's murder. Until then, Lippert had been one of the few executioners of the purge to evade trial. Lippert was convicted and sentenced to 18 months in prison.) SA-Obergruppenführer Viktor Lutze, who had been spying on Röhm, was named as the new Stabschef (SA).

== Reactions to the purge ==
While some Germans were shocked by the killings of 30 June to 2 July 1934 (known as the Night of the Long Knives), many others saw Hitler as the one who restored "order" to the country. Goebbels's propaganda highlighted the "Röhm-Putsch" in the days that followed. The homosexuality of Röhm and other SA leaders was made public to add "shock value", even though it had been known to Hitler and other Nazi leaders for years.

On 3 July 1934 the purge of the SA was legalised with a one-paragraph decree: the Law Regarding Measures of State Self-Defence, a step that historian Robin Cross contended in 2009 was done by Hitler to cover his own tracks. The Law declared, "The measures taken on 30 June, 1 and 2 July to suppress treasonous assaults are legal as acts of self-defence by the State." At the time no public reference was made to the alleged SA rebellion, but only generalised references to misconduct, perversion and some sort of plot.

In a nationally broadcast speech to the Reichstag on 13 July, Hitler justified the purge as a defence against treason. By the time the events of the Night of the Long Knives concluded, not only was Röhm dead, but more than 200 additional people had been killed, (Note: Rudolf Pechel claims the number was much higher, placing the death toll at 922.) including Nazi official Gregor Strasser, former chancellor General Kurt von Schleicher, and Franz von Papen's secretary, Edgar Jung. Most of those murdered had little to no affiliation with Röhm but were killed for political reasons.

In an attempt to erase Röhm from German history, almost all known copies of the 1933 propaganda film The Victory of Faith (Der Sieg des Glaubens)—in which Röhm appeared—were destroyed in 1934, probably on Hitler's order; however, at least one copy has survived destruction. A new film called Triumph of the Will (Triumph des Willens) was shot in its place in 1935, with Victor Lutze replacing Röhm and the SA playing a much lesser role. (Note: The Victory of Faith was long thought to have been lost until a single copy was found in storage in Britain in the 1990s. See: The Victory of Faith, Internet Archive The 1935 film Triumph of the Will (Triumph des Willens), produced in 1934, showed the new Nazi hierarchy, with the SS as the Nazis' premier uniformed paramilitary group and Röhm replaced by Viktor Lutze. But by then, the role of the SA was much less prominent than in the early years. See: Charles Hamilton (1984), Leaders & Personalities of the Third Reich, Vol. 1, p. 312)

== Decorations and awards ==
- Military Merit Order (Bavaria) 4th Class with crown and swords, 1920
- Military Merit Order (Bavaria) 4th Class with swords, 1914
- 1914 Iron Cross 2nd Class
- 1914 Iron Cross 1st Class, 1916
- 1914 Wound Badge in Silver, 1918

== See also ==
- Glossary of Nazi Germany
- History of Germany
- List of Nazi Party leaders and officials
- Persecution of homosexuals in Nazi Germany
- Röhm scandal
- Sexuality of Adolf Hitler

Military offices
Preceded by Otto Wagener	Stabschef-SA; 1931–34	Succeeded by Viktor Lutze
