= Stabschef =

Chief of staff of Nazi Party paramilitary wing

Stabschef SA

- Earlier (left) and later (right) command flag

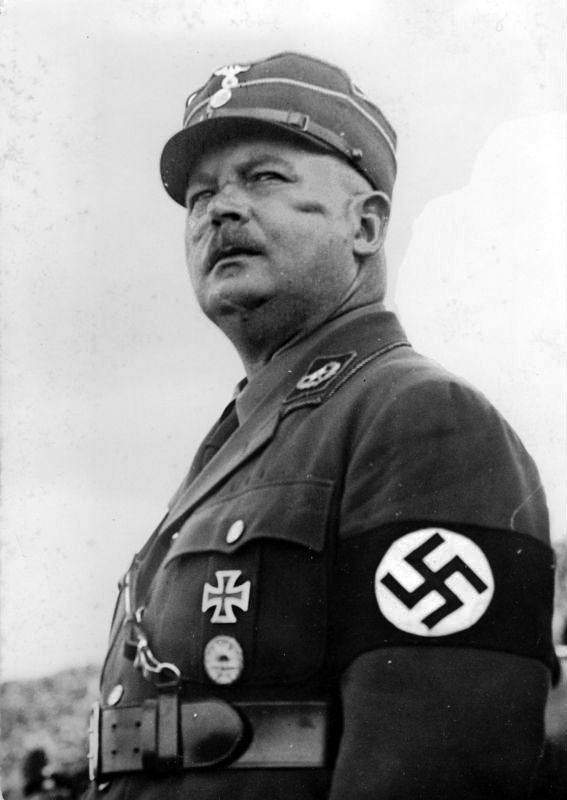
- Best known officeholder Ernst Röhm; 5 January 1931 – 1 July 1934
- Sturmabteilung
- Status: Commanding officer of a paramilitary organisation
- Member of: Oberste SA-Führung
- Reports to: Oberste SA-Führer
- Appointer: Adolf Hitler
- Formation: 1 October 1929
- First holder: Otto Wagener
- Final holder: Wilhelm Schepmann
- Abolished: 5 May 1945
- Deputy: Stabsführer

Stabschef ([ʃtaːps.ʃɛf], lit. 'Chief of staff') was an office and paramilitary rank in the Sturmabteilung (SA), the paramilitary stormtroopers associated with the Nazi Party. It was a rank and position held by the operating chief of the SA. The rank was equivalent to the rank of Generaloberst in the German Army and to General in the U.S. Army.

== Definition ==
The position of SA-Stabschef, not yet a rank, was established in 1929 to assist the Oberste SA-Führer (Supreme SA Leader) with the administration of the fast-growing organisation. Otto Wagener held the office under Oberste SA-Führer Franz Pfeffer von Salomon from 1928 to 1930, and effectively headed the SA from Hitler's assumption of the title Oberste SA-Führer in August until Ernst Röhm replaced him in January 1931.

The actual SA rank of Stabschef was created by Röhm for himself in 1933 after Hitler became chancellor. Although Hitler became the supreme commander of the SA in 1930, the day-to-day running of the organisation was left to the chief of staff. Thus, the men who held the rank of Stabschef after 1930 were the actual leaders of the SA.

== Office holders ==
The office of Stabschef was held by four different people between 1929 and 1945 and was, in all but the first case of succession, inherited due to the death of a predecessor. The following SA officers held the office of Stabschef:

No.	Portrait	Stabschef	Took office	Left office	Time in office	Party	Ref.
1	Otto Wagener	Otto Wagener (1888–1971)	1 October 1929	31 December 1930	1 year, 91 days	NSDAP	
2	Ernst Röhm	Ernst Röhm (1887–1934)	5 January 1931	1 July 1934 (executed)	3 years, 177 days	NSDAP	
3	Viktor Lutze	Viktor Lutze (1890–1943)	1 July 1934	2 May 1943 ‽ (Note: Died in a car accident)	8 years, 305 days	NSDAP	
–	Max Jüttner	Max Jüttner (1888–1963); Acting	2 May 1943	18 August 1943	108 days	NSDAP	
4	Wilhelm Schepmann	Wilhelm Schepmann (1894–1970)	18 August 1943	5 May 1945	1 year, 8 months	NSDAP	

=== Timeline ===
This is a graphical timeline of the Stabschef. They are listed in order of first assuming office.

The following chart lists the Stabschef by lifespan, with the years outside of their tenure in grey.

== Insignia ==
Early insignia for Stabschef consisted of an oak leaf patch worn on the collar of the stormtrooper uniform. Photographic evidence shows Ernst Röhm wearing such an insignia in his early days as the SA Chief of Staff. As Röhm's authority increased, so did his insignia and by mid 1931 photographic evidence shows him wearing wreathed star that was designed after that of a Bolivian general's collar, due to Röhm's previous military experience as a military adviser in Bolivia.

After 1933, the insignia for Stabschef consisted of a "crossed lances" pattern, wreathed by a half oak leaf circle. After 1934, the insignia was changed to a wreathed tri-foil oak leaf pattern similar to the SS rank insignia of Reichsführer-SS. With the fall of Nazi Germany, the Sturmabteilung ceased to exist and with it the Stabschef.

Gorget patch (1933–1934)

Gorget patch (1934–1945)

Shoulder patch (1933–1945)

Junior rank SA-Obergruppenführer	SA rank Chef des Stabes der SA	Senior rank Oberster SA-Führer

== See also ==
- Supreme SA Leader

== Bibliography ==
- Campbell, Bruce (1998). The SA Generals and The Rise of Nazism. The University Press of Kentucky. ISBN 978-0813120478.
- Flaherty, T. H. (2004) [1988]. The Third Reich: The SS. Time-Life Books, Inc. ISBN 1-84447-073-3.
- Hamilton, Charles (1984). Leaders & Personalities of the Third Reich, Vol. 1. R. James Bender Publishing. ISBN 0912138270.
- McNab, Chris (2009). The Third Reich. Amber Books Ltd. ISBN 978-1-906626-51-8.
- Zentner, Christian; Bedürftig, Friedemann (1997) [1991]. The Encyclopedia of the Third Reich. New York: Da Capo Press. ISBN 978-0-3068079-3-0.
