= Władysław Drapiewski =

Polish painter (1876 to 1961)

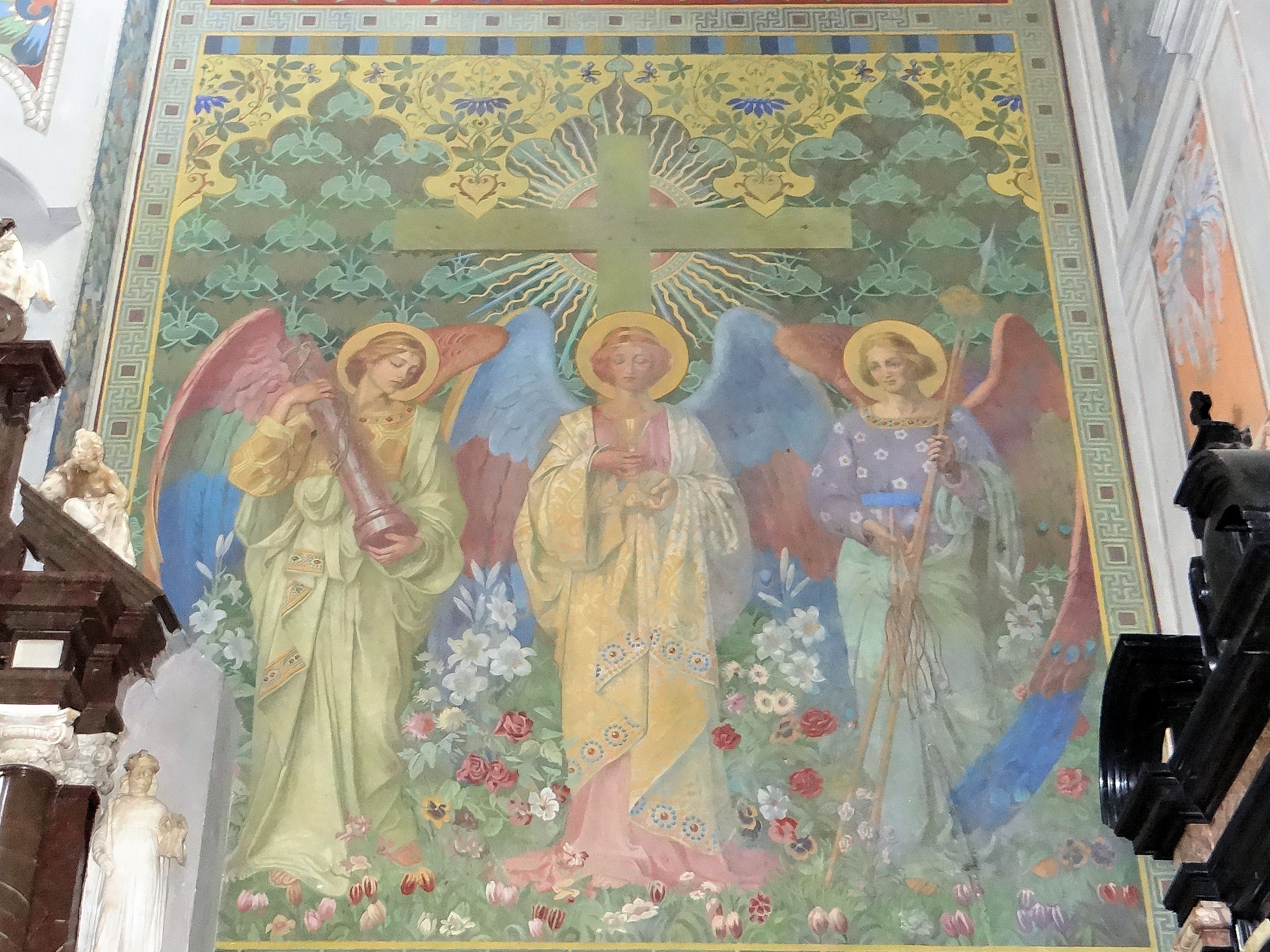
- Polychrome in the interior of the Płock Cathedral
- Born: 12 November 1876; Gacki, Kuyavian-Pomeranian Voivodeship
- Died: 30 December 1961 (aged 85); Pelplin
- Education: International School of Church Painting, Academy of Arts in Berlin, Académie Julian
- Known for: He created wall polychromes in 122 temples.
- Awards: Papal Lateran Cross, Commander's Cross of the Order of St. Gregory the Great

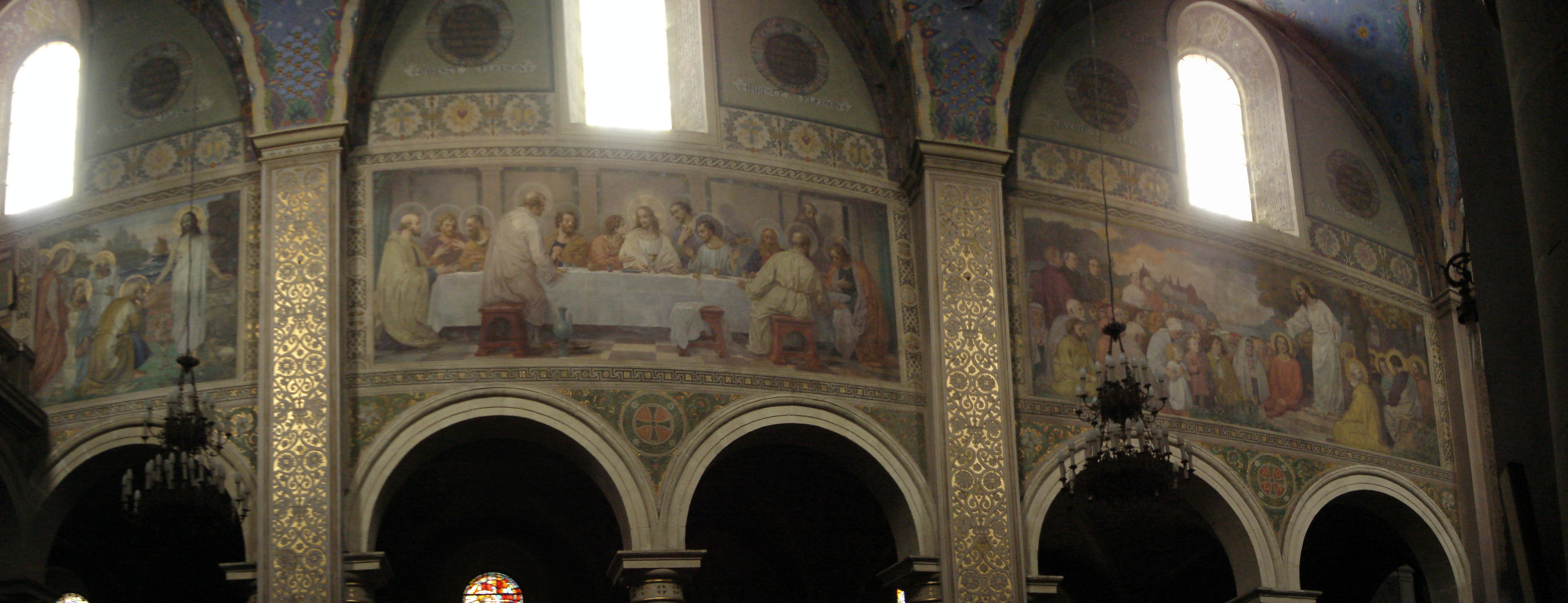
Another view of the Płock Cathedral

Władysław Drapiewski (12 November 1876, Gacki – 30 December 1961, Pelplin) was a Polish painter who was one of the best-known creators of religious paintings in the first half of the 20th-century in Poland.

== Biography ==
He initially studied painting and graphics with Antoni Szymański. He left for Kevelaer in 1899, where he studied at the International School of Church Painting headed by Friedrich Stummel. Painting was taught there in accordance with the artistic assumptions of the Nazarene movement. At the same time, he traveled to Paris, Berlin, Munich and Rome, studying in places such as the Academy of Arts in Berlin and Académie Julian. After returning to Poland, he was involved in the creation of a polychrome interior of the Płock Cathedral in Płock. This happened because, after the competition was settled in 1901, the design of Józef Mehoffer was chosen, but bishop Jerzy Józef Szembek had reservations about the liturgical issues posed and the work was stopped in the absence of an agreement. In the meantime, the bishop of Płock was Apolinary Wnukowski, who was presented the project of Drapiewski, whose work gained the approval of both the bishop and the chapter. To help with such a large project, he employed the Luxembourgian painter Nicolas Brücher. The painted characters of the polychrome gave the faces of people such as Tadeusz Korzon, Władysław Smoleński and Stanisław Tarnowski. As a background, he created a panorama of Płock, with the young residents of the city posed for the image of angels, among others Mira Zimińska. A specific self-portrait of the artist is the figure of saint. Placed on the cathedral polychrome was Saint Peter.

In 1914, during World War I, he was arrested and sent to the depths of the Russian Empire, and Czesław Idźkiewicz, his student and assistant, continued his work at that time. His brothers Leon (1885-1970) and Kazimierz (1889-1978) helped him with many projects, and later their sons. In total, he made wall polychromes in 122 temples, the largest in Mazovia and areas located east of it. In addition to temples, he also adorned the interiors of public buildings, including in the Marshal Stanisław Małachowski High School in Płock. In 1928, Pope Pius XI awarded him with the Papal Lateran Cross. The critical attitude to historical aesthetics meant that the work of Drapiewski was contemptuously referred to as "drapiewszczyzną", which was identified with provincialism and lack of taste. From 1918, he lived permanently in Pelplin. Being displaced in 1943 due to World War II, he went to the abbey near Opactwo and stayed there until 1946. In 1958, Pope Pius XII awarded the artist with the Commander's Cross of the Order of St. Gregory the Great.
