= Szembek coat of arms =

Polish coat of arms

Szembek
- Earliest mention: unknown
- Towns: none
- Families: Szembek

Szembek is a Polish coat of arms used by the Szembek szlachta family in the times of the Polish–Lithuanian Commonwealth. This family originated from Tyrol, their name Schönbeck was polonized around 1566.

== History ==
It was first given to Bartłomiej Szembek on July 25th 1556. According to Józef Szymański, the nobilitation document was a 17th century forgery. Anna Wajs and Kasper Niesiecki give it the date of 1566, and speak of an indygenat. The latter two authors also mention the German surname of the ennobled - Schonbegk according to Wajs, and Schombek according to Niesiecki.

== Notable bearers ==
Notable bearers of this coat of arms include:

- Jan Szembek
- Józef Eustachy Szembek, 18th century bishop

== See also ==
- Polish heraldry
- Heraldry
- Coat of arms
