= Jerzy Józef Szembek =

Polish Roman Catholic bishop (1851–1905)

- Archbishop of Mohilev
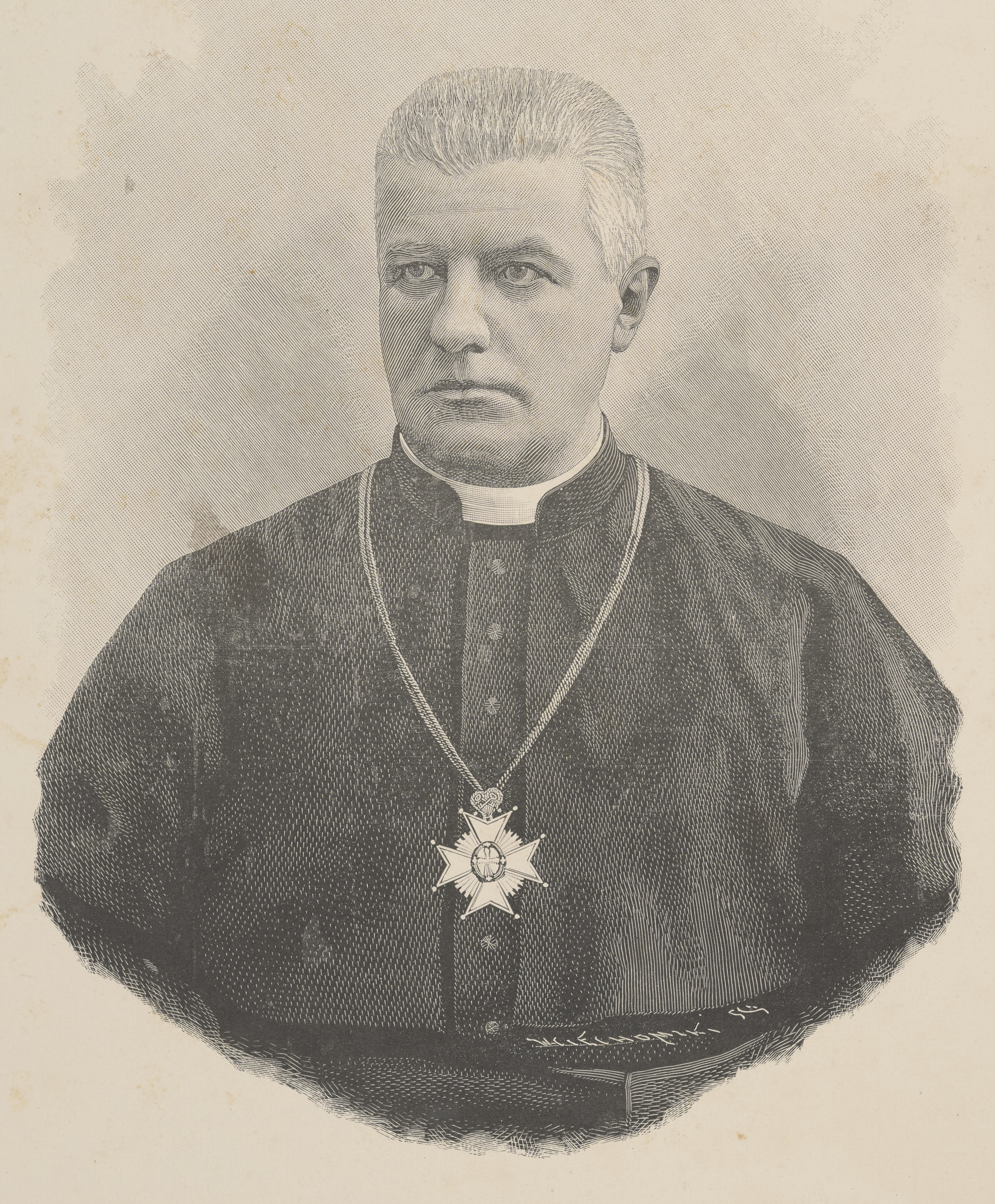
- Appointed: 9 November 1903
- Predecessor: Bolesław Hieronim Kłopotowski
- Successor: Apolinary Wnukowski
- Previous post: Bishop of Płock (1901 – 1903)

Orders
- Ordination: 19 March 1893
- Consecration: 30 June 1901 by Bolesław Hieronim Kłopotowski

Personal details
- Born: 14 June 1851
- Died: 7 August 1905 (aged 54) Poręba Żegoty

Jerzy Józef Elizeusz Szembek (14 June 1851 – 7 August 1905) was a Roman Catholic bishop of the Archdiocese of Mohilev. He previously served as bishop of the Diocese of Płock from 1901 to 1903.

== Biography ==
Szembek was born to Józef and Józefa (née Moszyńskich) Szembek; he was a member of the Szembek family. In 1863, he began attending Saint Anne's Gymnasium. He graduated in 1869, after which he began attending Jagiellonian University, where he studied the history of Polish literature and law. He intended to become a professor of chemistry — however, his grandfather forbade him from doing so and he was sent across Europe, including to Austria, Switzerland, Germany and Italy. Eventually, under the influence of Albin Dunajewski, he began to study Christianity, and was baptized on 8 May 1883.

After the death of his father, Szembek began attending the diocesan seminary at Saratov on 25 July 1890; after completing his theological studies there, he was ordained a priest on 19 March 1893. He first served as a vicar for the cathedral at Saratov; after a brief stint as a parish vicar at Astrakhan, he returned to Saratov, where he organized parish schools and built shelters for the homeless. He was then appointed professor of moral theology of the seminary at Saratov. On 15 April 1901, he was appointed by Pope Leo XIII as bishop of the Diocese of Płock; he was consecrated on 30 June 1901 by Bolesław Hieronim Kłopotowski, co-consecrated by Antanas Baranauskas and Karol Antoni Niedziałkowski.

On 9 November 1903, Szembek was appointed by Pope Pius X as archbishop of the Archdiocese of Mohilev; he received his pallium on 6 May 1904 at the Church of St. Catherine from Mečislovas Leonardas Paliulionis. He died on 7 August 1905 in Poręba Żegoty, and was buried there on 10 August.
