= Night of the Long Knives =

1934 purge in Germany

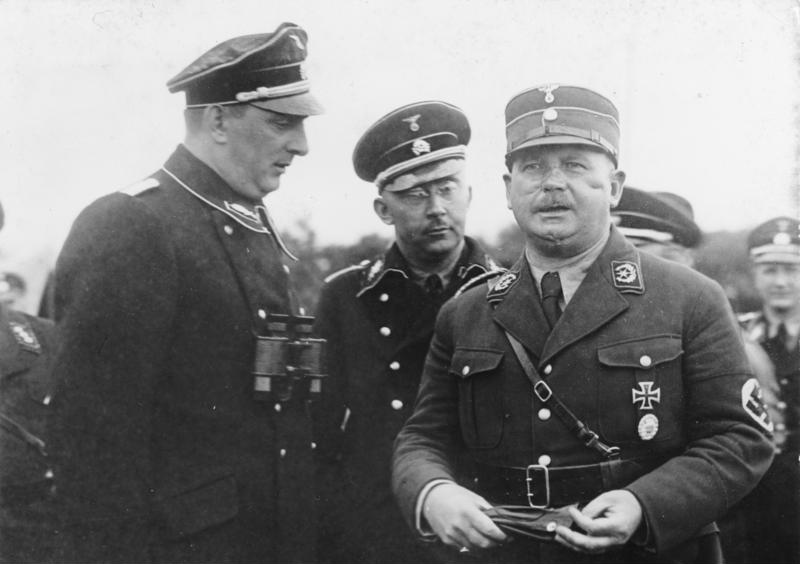
- Kurt Daluege, chief of the Ordnungspolizei; Heinrich Himmler, head of the SS; and Ernst Röhm, head of the SA, August 1933
- Native name: Unternehmen Kolibri
- Date: 30 June – 2 July 1934 (three days)
- Location: Nazi Germany
- Also known as: Operation Hummingbird; Röhm Putsch (by the Nazis); The Blood Purge
- Type: Purge
- Cause: Hitler's desire to consolidate his power and settle old scores; Concern of the Reichswehr about the SA; Desire of Ernst Röhm and the SA to continue "the National Socialist revolution" versus Hitler's need for relative social stability so that the economy could be refocused to rearmament and the German people acclimated to the need for expansion and war; Hitler's need to bring the Reichswehr under his control; Nazi exploitation of anti-homosexual prejudice against Ernst Röhm and other SA members
- Organised by: Adolf Hitler; Hermann Göring; Heinrich Himmler; Reinhard Heydrich
- Participants: Schutzstaffel; Gestapo
- Outcome: Assassination of former Chancellor Kurt von Schleicher; Hitler's supremacy confirmed; Elimination of the SA as a threat along with leader Ernst Röhm; Suppression of the Strasserist faction and death of its leader, Gregor Strasser; Significant reduction in the regime's opposition; Strengthening of relationship between Hitler and the military
- Casualties: Officially 85; estimates range up to 1,000

The Night of the Long Knives (German: Nacht der langen Messer [ˈnaxt dɛɐ̯ ˈlaŋən ˈmɛsɐ]), also called the Röhm purge or Operation Hummingbird (Aktion Kolibri), was a purge that took place in Nazi Germany from 30 June to 2 July 1934. Chancellor Adolf Hitler, urged on by Hermann Göring and Heinrich Himmler, ordered a series of extrajudicial executions intended to consolidate his power and alleviate the German military's concerns about the role of Ernst Röhm and the Sturmabteilung (SA), the Nazis' paramilitary organization, known colloquially as brownshirts. Nazi propaganda presented the murders as a preventive measure against an alleged imminent coup by the SA under Röhm – the so-called Röhm Putsch.

The primary instruments of Hitler's actions were the Schutzstaffel (SS) paramilitary force under Himmler and its Security Service (SD), and the Gestapo (secret police) under Reinhard Heydrich, which between them carried out most of the killings. Göring's personal police battalion also took part. Many of those killed in the purge were leaders of the SA, the best-known being Röhm himself, the SA's chief of staff and one of Hitler's longtime supporters and allies. Leading members of the Strasserist faction of the Nazi Party, including its leader Gregor Strasser, were also killed, as were establishment conservatives and anti-Nazis, such as former Chancellor Kurt von Schleicher and Bavarian politician Gustav Ritter von Kahr, who had helped suppress Hitler's Beer Hall Putsch in 1923. The murders of SA leaders were also intended to improve the image of the Hitler government with a German public increasingly critical of thuggish SA tactics.

Hitler saw the SA's independence and its members' penchant for street violence as a direct threat to his newly gained political power. He also wanted to appease leaders of the Reichswehr, the German military, who feared and despised the SA as a potential rival, in particular because of Röhm's ambition to merge the army and the SA under his leadership. Additionally, Hitler was uncomfortable with Röhm's outspoken support for a "second revolution" to redistribute wealth. In Röhm's view, President Paul von Hindenburg's appointment of Hitler as chancellor on 30 January 1933 had brought the Nazi Party to power but had left the party's larger goals unfulfilled. Finally, Hitler used the purge to attack or eliminate German critics of his new regime, especially those loyal to Vice-Chancellor Franz von Papen, and settle scores with enemies. (Note: Papen, nonetheless, remained in his position although people quite close to him were murdered, including Edgar Jung, the writer of the Marburg speech Papen had given which was critical of the Nazi regime.)

At least 85 people died during the purge, although the final death toll might have been higher, (Note: Evans (2005) writes: "Hitler himself told the Reichstag on 13 July 1934 that seventy-four people had been killed, while Göring alone had had over a thousand people arrested. At least eighty-five people are known to have been summarily killed without any formal legal proceedings being taken against them.") (Note: Kershaw (1999) writes: "The names of eighty-five victims [exist], only fifty of them SA men. Some estimates, however, put the total number killed at between 150 and 200.") (Note: Johnson (1991) places the total at 150 killed.) with some estimates running from 700 to 1,000. More than 1,000 perceived opponents were arrested. The purge strengthened and consolidated the military's support for Hitler. It also provided a legal grounding for the Nazis, as the German courts and cabinet quickly swept aside centuries of legal prohibition against extrajudicial killings to demonstrate their loyalty to the regime. The Night of the Long Knives marked Hitler's absolute consolidation of judicial power and was a turning point in the establishment of Nazi Germany. Hitler went on to call himself "the administrator of justice of the German people" in his speech to the Reichstag on 13 July 1934.

== Hitler and the Sturmabteilung (SA) ==
Hitler poses with a Nazi salute in Nuremberg with SA members in 1928. To his left is Julius Streicher, and standing beneath him is Hermann Göring

President Paul von Hindenburg appointed Hitler chancellor on 30 January 1933. (Note: In the November 1932 parliamentary elections, the Nazi Party won 196 seats in the Reichstag out of a possible 584. The Nazis were the largest party in the legislature.) Over the following few months, during the so-called Gleichschaltung, Hitler dispensed with the need for the Reichstag of the Weimar Republic as a legislative body (Note: Through the Enabling Act of 1933 Hitler abrogated the nation's legislative power and was thereafter effectively able to rule through promulgation of decrees that avoided the legislative processes of the Weimar Constitution) and eliminated all rival political parties in Germany, so that by the middle of 1933 the country had become a one-party state under his direction and control. Hitler did not exercise absolute power, however, despite his swift consolidation of political authority. As chancellor, Hitler did not command the army, which remained under the formal leadership of Hindenburg, a highly respected veteran field marshal. While many officers were impressed by Hitler's promises of an expanded army, a return to conscription, and a more aggressive foreign policy, the army continued to guard its traditions of independence during the early years of the Nazi regime.

To a lesser extent, the Sturmabteilung (SA), a Nazi paramilitary organization, remained somewhat autonomous within the party. The SA evolved out of the remnants of the Freikorps movement of the post-World War I years. The Freikorps were nationalistic organizations primarily composed of disaffected, disenchanted, and angry German combat veterans utilized by the government in January 1919 to deal with the threat of a Communist revolution when it appeared that there was a lack of loyal troops. A very large number of the Freikorps believed that the November Revolution had betrayed them when Germany was alleged to be on the verge of victory in 1918. Hence, the Freikorps were in opposition to the new Weimar Republic, which was born as a result of the November Revolution, and whose founders were contemptuously called "November criminals". Captain Ernst Röhm of the Reichswehr served as the liaison with the Bavarian Freikorps. Röhm was given the nickname "the Machine Gun King of Bavaria" in the early 1920s, since he was responsible for storing and issuing illegal machine guns to the Bavarian Freikorps units. Röhm left the Reichswehr in 1923 and later became commander of the SA. During the 1920s and 1930s, the SA functioned as a private militia used by Hitler to intimidate rivals and disrupt the meetings of competing political parties, especially those of the Social Democrats and the Communists. Also known as the brownshirts and stormtroopers, the SA became notorious for their street battles with the Communists. The violent confrontations between the two contributed to the destabilization of the Weimar Republic. In June 1932, one of the worst months of political violence, there were more than 400 street battles, resulting in 82 deaths.

Hitler's appointment as chancellor, followed by the suppression of all political parties except the Nazis, did not end the violence of the stormtroopers. Deprived of Communist party meetings to disrupt, the stormtroopers would sometimes run riot in the streets after a night of drinking; they would attack passers-by and then attack the police who were called to stop them. Complaints of "overbearing and loutish" behaviour by stormtroopers became common by the middle of 1933. The Foreign Office even complained of instances where brownshirts manhandled foreign diplomats.

On 6 July 1933, at a gathering of high-ranking Nazi officials, Hitler declared the success of the National Socialist, or Nazi, seizure of power. Now that the Nazi Party had seized the reins of power in Germany, he said, it was time to consolidate its control. Hitler told the gathered officials, "the stream of revolution has been undammed, but it must be channelled into the secure bed of evolution."

Hitler's speech signalled his intention to rein in the SA, whose ranks had grown rapidly in the early 1930s. Hitler's task would not be simple, however, as the SA made up a large part of Nazism's most devoted followers. The SA traced its dramatic rise in numbers in part to the onset of the Great Depression, when many German citizens lost both their jobs and their faith in traditional institutions. While Nazism was not exclusively – or even primarily – a working-class phenomenon, the SA fulfilled the yearning of many unemployed workers for class solidarity and nationalist fervour. (Note: Schoenbaum (1997) writes: "The most general theory – that National Socialism was a revolution of the lower middle class – is defensible but inadequate.") Many stormtroopers believed in the socialist promise of National Socialism and expected the Nazi regime to take more radical economic action, such as breaking up the vast landed estates of the aristocracy. When the Nazi regime did not take such steps, those who had expected an economic as well as a political revolution were disillusioned. (Note: Bullock (1958) writes: "But in origin the National Socialists had been a radical anti-capitalist party, and this part of the National Socialist programme was not only taken seriously by many loyal Party members but was of increasing importance in a period of economic depression. How seriously Hitler took the socialist character of National Socialism was to remain one of the main causes of disagreement and division within the Nazi party up to the summer of 1934.")

The action Hitler took would not only defang Röhm and the SA as a potential threat to Hitler's personal control of the Nazi Party, but would also serve to strengthen his relationship with the Wehrmacht – the German armed forces – which had long considered the SA to be their primary rival, the SA at times outnumbering the military in manpower.

The supporters of Ernst Röhm (Röhm-cult), like the Strasserists, formed one of the ideological factions of the Nazi Party at that time.

== Conflict between the army and the SA ==
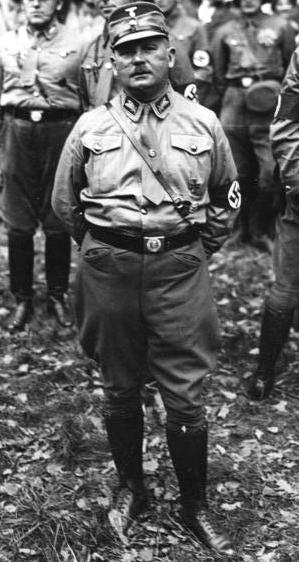
SA leader Ernst Röhm in Bavaria in 1931

No one in the SA spoke more loudly for "a continuation of the German revolution" (as one prominent stormtrooper, Edmund Heines, put it) than Röhm himself. Röhm, as one of the earliest members of the Nazi Party, had participated in the Munich Beer Hall Putsch, an attempt by Hitler to seize power by force in 1923. A combat veteran of World War I, Röhm had recently boasted that he would execute twelve men in retaliation for the killing of any stormtrooper.

Not content solely with the leadership of the SA, Röhm lobbied Hitler to appoint him Minister of Defence, a position held by the conservative General Werner von Blomberg. Although nicknamed the Rubber Lion by some of his critics in the army for his devotion to Hitler, Blomberg was not a Nazi, and therefore represented a bridge between the army and the party. Blomberg and many of his fellow officers were recruited from the Prussian nobility and regarded the SA as a plebeian rabble that threatened the army's traditional high status in German society.

If the regular army showed contempt for the masses belonging to the SA, many stormtroopers returned the feeling, seeing the army as insufficiently committed to the National Socialist dictatorship. Max Heydebreck, an SA leader in Rummelsburg, denounced the army to his fellow brownshirts, telling them, "Some of the officers of the army are swine. Most officers are too old and have to be replaced by young ones. We want to wait till Papa Hindenburg is dead, and then the SA will march against the army."

Despite such hostility between the brownshirts and the regular army, Blomberg and others in the military saw the SA as a source of raw recruits for an enlarged and revitalized army. Röhm, however, wanted to eliminate the generalship of the Prussian aristocracy altogether, using the SA to become the core of a new German military. With the army limited by the Treaty of Versailles to one hundred thousand soldiers, its leaders watched anxiously as membership in the SA surpassed three million men by the beginning of 1934. In January 1934, Röhm presented Blomberg with a memorandum demanding that the SA replace the regular army as the nation's ground forces, and that the Reichswehr become a training adjunct to the SA.

In response, Hitler met Blomberg and the leadership of the SA and SS on 28 February 1934. Under pressure from Hitler, Röhm reluctantly signed a pledge stating that he recognised the supremacy of the Reichswehr over the SA. Hitler announced to those present that the SA would act as an auxiliary to the Reichswehr, not the other way around. After Hitler and most of the army officers had left, however, Röhm declared that he would not take instructions from "the ridiculous corporal" – a demeaning reference to Hitler. While Hitler did not take immediate action against Röhm for his intemperate outburst, it nonetheless deepened the rift between them.

== Growing pressure against the SA ==
Despite his earlier agreement with Hitler, Röhm still clung to his vision of a new German army with the SA at its core. By early 1934, this vision directly conflicted with Hitler's plan to consolidate power and expand the Reichswehr. Because their plans for the army conflicted, Röhm's success could come only at Hitler's expense. Moreover, it was not just the Reichswehr that viewed the SA as a threat. Several of Hitler's lieutenants feared Röhm's growing power and restlessness, as did Hitler. As a result, a political struggle within the party grew, with those closest to Hitler, including Prussian premier Hermann Göring, Propaganda Minister Joseph Goebbels, Reichsführer-SS Heinrich Himmler, and Hitler's deputy Rudolf Hess, positioning themselves against Röhm. While all of these men were veterans of the Nazi movement, only Röhm continued to demonstrate his independence from, rather than his loyalty to, Adolf Hitler. Röhm's contempt for the party's bureaucracy angered Hess. SA violence in Prussia gravely concerned Göring.

Finally, in early 1934, the growing rift between Röhm and Hitler over the role of the SA in the Nazi state led former chancellor General Kurt von Schleicher to start playing politics again. Schleicher criticized the current Hitler cabinet, while some of Schleicher's followers such as General Ferdinand von Bredow and Werner von Alvensleben started passing along lists of a new Hitler cabinet in which Schleicher would become vice-chancellor, Röhm minister of defence, Heinrich Brüning foreign minister and Gregor Strasser minister of national economy. The British historian Sir John Wheeler-Bennett, who knew Schleicher and his circle well, wrote that Bredow displayed a "lack of discretion" that was "terrifying" as he went about showing the list of the proposed cabinet to anyone who was interested. Although Schleicher was in fact unimportant by 1934, increasingly wild rumours that he was scheming with Röhm to re-enter the corridors of power helped stoke the sense of crisis.

As a means of isolating Röhm, on 20 April 1934, Göring transferred control of the Prussian political police (Gestapo) to Himmler, who, Göring believed, could be counted on to move against Röhm. Himmler named his deputy Reinhard Heydrich to head the Gestapo on 22 April 1934. Himmler envied the independence and power of the SA, although by this time he and Heydrich had already begun restructuring the SS from a bodyguard formation for Nazi leaders (and a subset of the SA) into its own independent elite corps, one loyal to both himself and Hitler. The loyalty of the SS men would prove useful to both when Hitler finally chose to move against Röhm and the SA. By May, lists of those to be "liquidated" started to circulate amongst Göring and Himmler's people, who engaged in a trade, adding enemies of one in exchange for sparing friends of the other. At the end of May, Brüning and Schleicher, two former chancellors, received warnings from friends in the Reichswehr that their lives were in danger and they should leave Germany at once. Brüning fled to the Netherlands while Schleicher dismissed the tip-off as a bad practical joke. By the beginning of June everything was set and all that was needed was permission from Hitler.

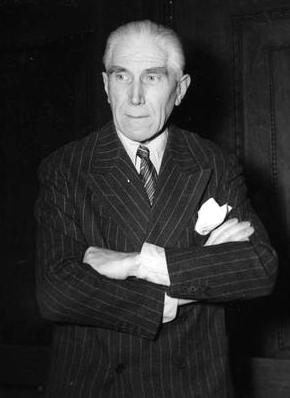
Franz von Papen, the conservative vice-chancellor who ran afoul of Hitler after denouncing the regime's failure to rein in the SA in his Marburg speech. The photo was taken in 1946 at the Nuremberg trials.

Demands for Hitler to constrain the SA strengthened. Conservatives in the army, industry and politics placed Hitler under increasing pressure to reduce the influence of the SA and to move against Röhm. While Röhm's homosexuality did not endear him to conservatives, they were more concerned about his political ambitions. Hitler remained indecisive and uncertain about just what precisely he wanted to do when he left for Venice to meet Benito Mussolini on 15 June. Before Hitler left, and at the request of Presidential State Secretary Otto Meißner, Foreign Minister Baron Konstantin von Neurath ordered the German Ambassador to Italy Ulrich von Hassell – without Hitler's knowledge – to ask Mussolini to tell Hitler that the SA was blackening Germany's good name. Neurath's manoeuvre to put pressure on Hitler paid off, with Mussolini agreeing to the request (Neurath was a former ambassador to Italy, and knew Mussolini well). During the summit in Venice, Mussolini upbraided Hitler for tolerating the violence, hooliganism and homosexuality of the SA, which Mussolini stated were ruining Hitler's good reputation all over the world. Mussolini used the affair occasioned by the June 1924 kidnapping and murder of Italian socialist politician Giacomo Matteotti as an example of the kind of trouble unruly followers could cause a dictator. While Mussolini's criticism did not win Hitler over to acting against the SA, it helped push him in that direction.

On 17 June 1934, conservative demands for Hitler to act came to a head when Vice-Chancellor Franz von Papen, confidant of the ailing Hindenburg, gave a speech at Marburg University warning of the threat of a "second revolution". According to his memoirs, Papen, a Catholic aristocrat with ties to army and industry, privately threatened to resign if Hitler did not act. While Papen's resignation as vice-chancellor would not have threatened Hitler's position, it would have nonetheless been an embarrassing display of independence from a leading conservative.

== Heydrich and Himmler ==
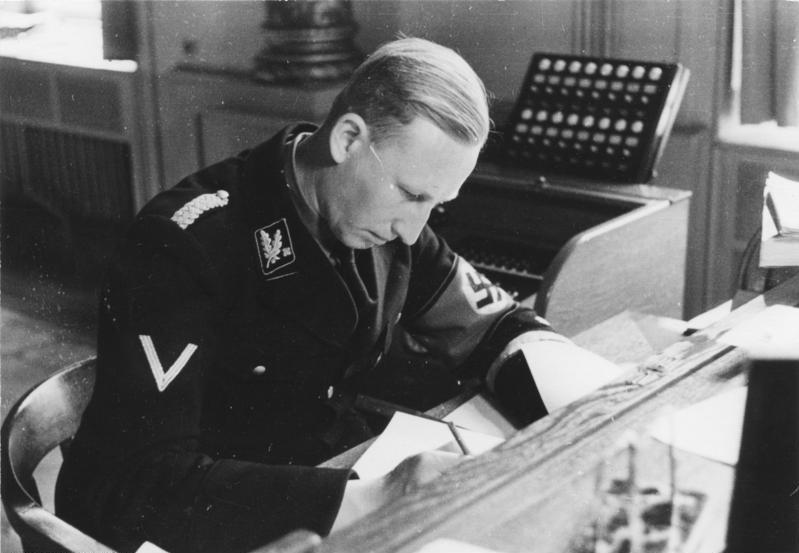
SS-Brigadeführer Reinhard Heydrich, head of the Bavarian police and SD, in Munich, 1934

In response to conservative pressure to constrain Röhm, Hitler left on 21 June for Neudeck to meet with Hindenburg. Blomberg, who had been meeting with the president, uncharacteristically reproached Hitler for not having moved against Röhm earlier. He then told Hitler that Hindenburg was close to declaring martial law and turning the government over to the Reichswehr if Hitler did not take immediate steps against Röhm and his brownshirts. Hitler had hesitated for months in moving against Röhm, in part due to Röhm's visibility as the leader of a national militia with millions of members. The threat of a declaration of martial law from Hindenburg, the only person in Germany with the authority to potentially depose the Nazi regime, put Hitler under pressure to act. He left Neudeck with the intention of both destroying Röhm and settling scores with old enemies. Both Himmler and Göring welcomed Hitler's decision, since both had much to gain by Röhm's downfall – the independence of the SS for Himmler and the removal of a rival for the future command of the army for Göring.

In preparation for the purge, both Himmler and Heydrich assembled a dossier of manufactured evidence to suggest that Röhm had been paid 12 million ℛ︁ℳ︁ (€29.1 million in 2021) by France to overthrow Hitler. Leading officers in the SS were shown falsified evidence on 24 June that Röhm planned to use the SA to launch a plot against the government (Röhm-Putsch). Röhm's homosexuality was used against him. In addition, Röhm and other SA leaders were accused of debauchery and acts of drunkenness. At Hitler's direction, Göring, Himmler, Heydrich, and Victor Lutze drew up lists of people in and outside the SA to be killed. One of the men Göring recruited to assist him was Willi Lehmann, a Gestapo official and NKVD spy. On 25 June, General Werner von Fritsch placed the Reichswehr on the highest level of alert. On 27 June, Hitler moved to secure the army's cooperation. Blomberg and General Walther von Reichenau, the army's liaison to the party, gave it to him by expelling Röhm from the German Officers' League. On 28 June Hitler went to Essen to attend the wedding celebration and reception of Josef Terboven; from there he called Röhm's adjutant at Bad Wiessee and ordered SA leaders to meet with him on 30 June at 11:00. On 29 June, a signed article in Völkischer Beobachter by Blomberg appeared in which Blomberg stated with great fervour that the Reichswehr stood behind Hitler.

== Purge ==
At about 04:30 on 30 June 1934, Hitler and his entourage flew to Munich. From the airport they drove to the Bavarian Interior Ministry, where they assembled the leaders of an SA rampage that had taken place in city streets the night before. Enraged, Hitler tore the epaulets off the shirt of SA-Obergruppenführer August Schneidhuber, the chief of the Munich police, for failing to keep order in the city the previous night. Hitler shouted at Schneidhuber and accused him of treachery. Schneidhuber was executed later that day. As the stormtroopers were hustled off to prison, Hitler assembled a large group of SS and regular police and departed for the Hanselbauer Hotel in Bad Wiessee, where Ernst Röhm and his followers were staying.

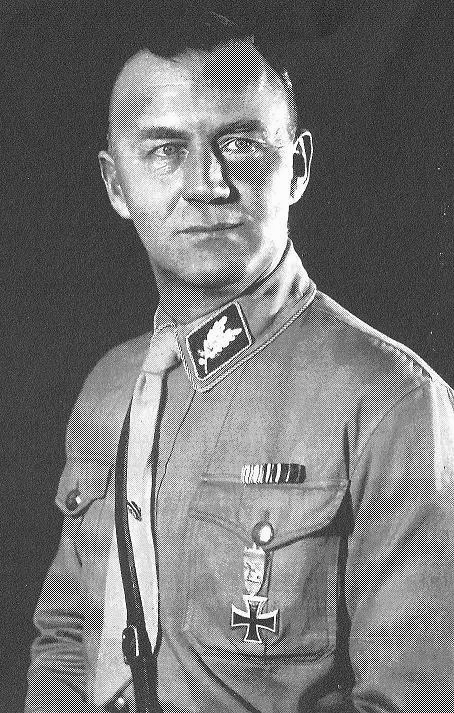
SA-Obergruppenführer August Schneidhuber, chief of the Munich police, 1930

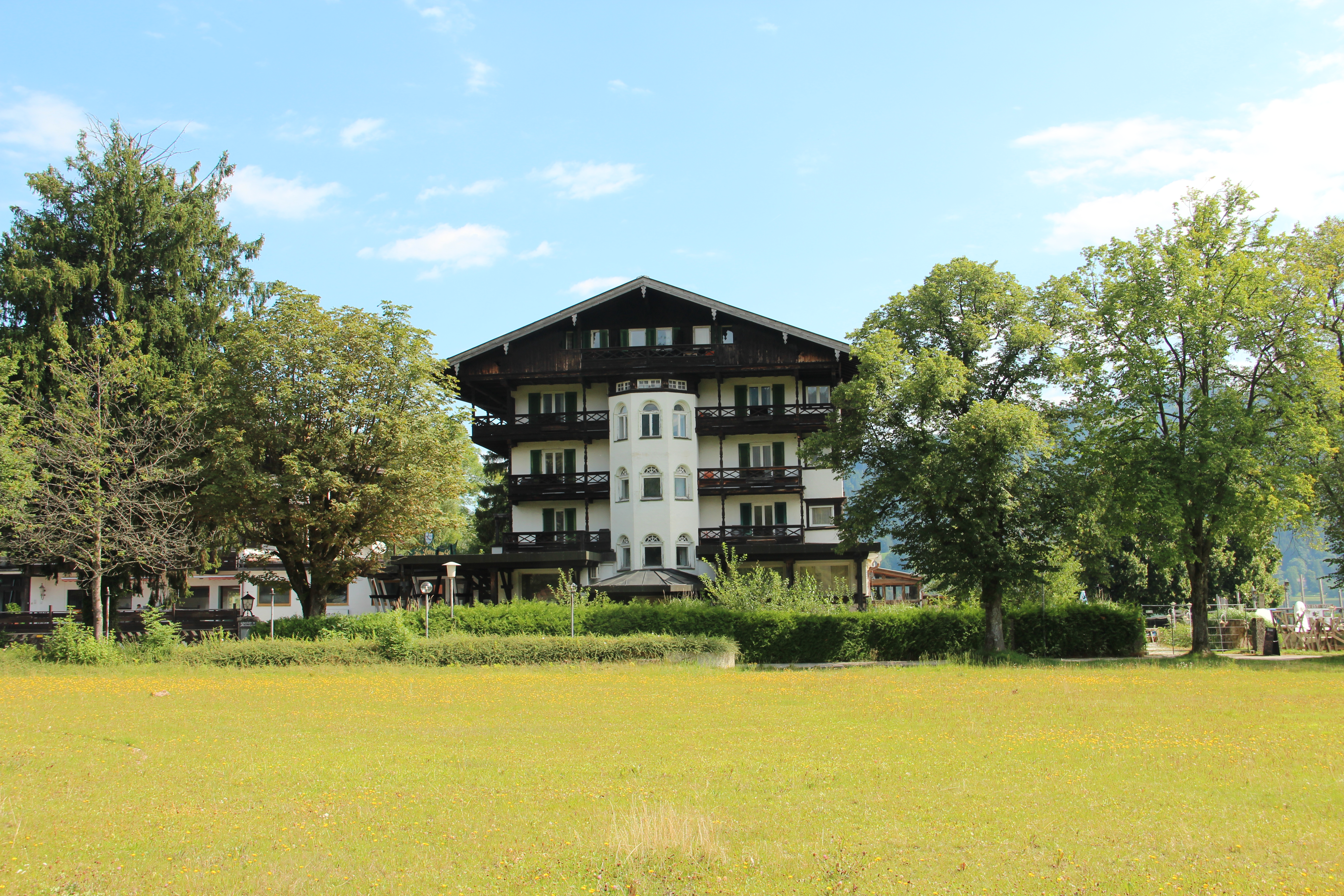
Hotel Lederer am See (formerly Kurheim Hanselbauer) in Bad Wiessee before its planned demolition in 2017

With Hitler's arrival in Bad Wiessee between 06:00 and 07:00, the SA leadership, still in bed, were taken by surprise. SS men stormed the hotel, and Hitler personally placed Röhm and other high-ranking SA leaders under arrest.

The SS found Breslau SA leader Edmund Heines in bed with an unidentified eighteen-year-old male SA senior troop leader. Hitler ordered both Heines and his partner taken outside the hotel and shot. Goebbels emphasised this aspect in subsequent propaganda justifying the purge as a crackdown on moral turpitude. Meanwhile, the SS arrested the other SA leaders as they left their train for the planned meeting with Röhm and Hitler.

Although Hitler presented no evidence of a plot by Röhm to overthrow the regime, he nevertheless denounced the leadership of the SA. Arriving back at party headquarters in Munich, Hitler addressed the assembled crowd. Consumed with rage, Hitler denounced "the worst treachery in world history". Hitler told the crowd that "undisciplined and disobedient characters and asocial or diseased elements" would be annihilated. The crowd, which included party members and many SA members fortunate enough to escape arrest, shouted its approval. Hess, present among the assembled, even volunteered to shoot the "traitors". Joseph Goebbels, who had been with Hitler at Bad Wiessee, set the final phase of the plan in motion. Upon returning to Berlin, Goebbels telephoned Göring at 10:00 with the codeword Kolibri to let loose the execution squads on the rest of their unsuspecting victims. Sepp Dietrich received orders from Hitler for the Leibstandarte to form an "execution squad" and go to Stadelheim Prison where certain SA leaders were being held. There in the prison courtyard, the Leibstandarte firing squad shot five SA generals and an SA colonel. Those not immediately executed were taken back to the Leibstandarte barracks at Lichterfelde, given one-minute "trials", and shot by a firing squad.

=== Against conservatives and old enemies ===
The regime did not limit itself to a purge of the SA. Having earlier imprisoned or exiled prominent Social Democrats and Communists, Hitler used the occasion to move against conservatives he considered unreliable. This included Vice-Chancellor Papen and those in his immediate circle. In Berlin, on Göring's personal orders, an armed SS unit stormed the Vice-Chancellery. Gestapo officers attached to the SS unit shot Papen's secretary Herbert von Bose without bothering to arrest him first. The Gestapo arrested and later executed Papen's close associate Edgar Jung, the author of Papen's Marburg speech, and disposed of his body by dumping it in a ditch. The Gestapo also murdered Erich Klausener, the leader of Catholic Action, and a close Papen associate. Papen was unceremoniously arrested at the Vice-Chancellery, despite his insistent protests that he could not be arrested in his position as Vice-Chancellor. Although Hitler ordered him released days later, Papen no longer dared to criticize the regime and was sent off to Vienna as German ambassador.

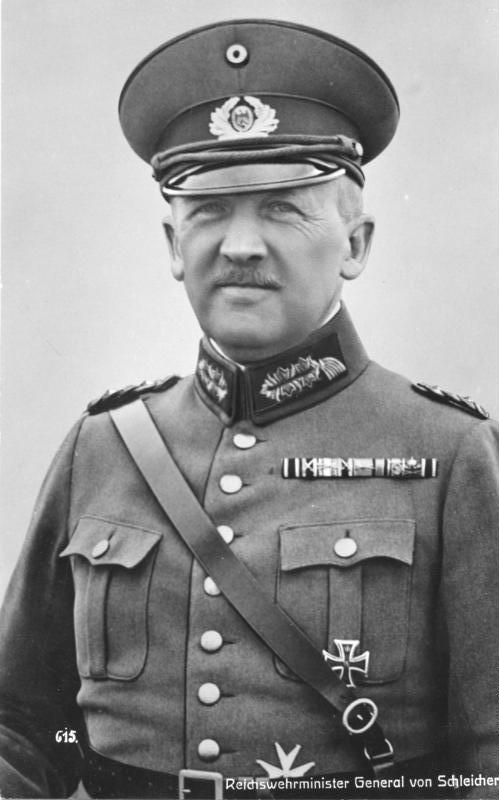
General Kurt von Schleicher, Hitler's predecessor as Chancellor, in uniform, 1932

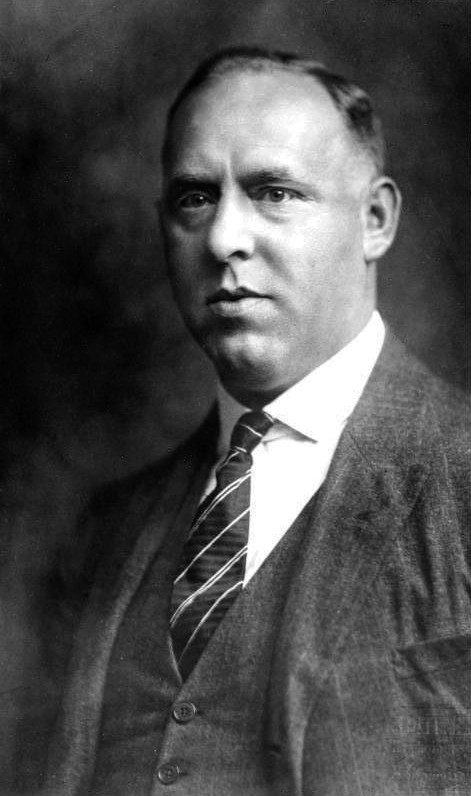
Gregor Strasser in 1928

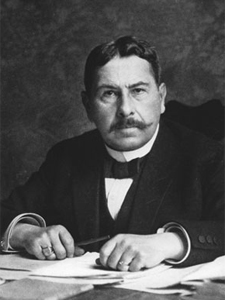
Gustav Ritter von Kahr in 1920

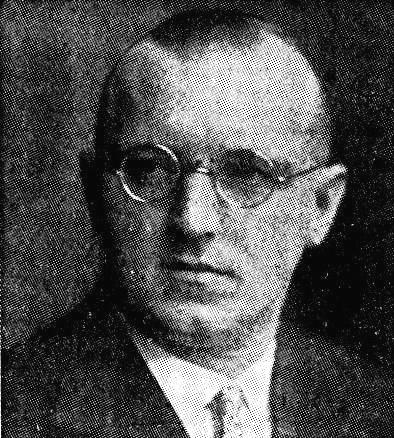
Willi Schmid, a mistaken victim of the purge, in 1930

Hitler and Himmler unleashed the Gestapo against old enemies. Both Kurt von Schleicher, Hitler's predecessor as Chancellor, and his wife were murdered at their home. Others killed included Gregor Strasser, a former Nazi who had angered Hitler by resigning from the party in 1932, and Gustav Ritter von Kahr, the former Bavarian state commissioner who had helped crush the Beer Hall Putsch in 1923. The murdered included at least one accidental victim: Willi Schmid, the music critic of the Münchner Neuste Nachrichten newspaper, whose name was confused with one of the Gestapo's intended targets. As Himmler's adjutant Karl Wolff later explained, friendship and personal loyalty were not allowed to stand in the way:

Among others, a charming fellow [named] Karl von Spreti, Röhm's personal adjutant. He held the same position with Röhm as I held with Himmler. [He] died with words "Heil Hitler" on his lips. We were close personal friends; we often dined together in Berlin. He lifted his arm in the Nazi salute and called out "Heil Hitler, I love Germany."

— Karl Wolff

Some SA members died saying "Heil Hitler" because they believed that an anti-Hitler SS plot had led to their execution. Several leaders of the disbanded Catholic Centre Party were also murdered in the purge. The party had generally been aligned with the Social Democrats and Catholic Church during the rise of Nazism, being critical of Nazi ideology, but voting nonetheless for the Enabling Act of 1933 which granted Hitler dictatorial authority. Kurt Lüdecke, a party associate of Röhm, was imprisoned but escaped after eight months in a concentration camp. He later wrote I Knew Hitler: The Story of a Nazi Who Escaped the Blood-Purge, published in 1937 by Scribners of New York, United States.

=== Röhm's fate ===
Röhm was held briefly at Stadelheim Prison (Note: Coincidentally, Hitler had been incarcerated at Stadelheim Prison for about five weeks following the Nazis' disruption of an opposing party's political rally in January 1921.) in Munich, while Hitler considered his future. On 1 July, at Hitler's behest, Theodor Eicke, Commandant of the Dachau concentration camp, and his SS adjutant Michael Lippert visited Röhm. Once inside Röhm's cell, they handed him a Browning pistol loaded with a single cartridge and told him he had ten minutes to kill himself or they would do it for him. Röhm demurred, telling them, "If I am to be killed, let Adolf do it himself." Having heard nothing in the allotted time, they returned to Röhm's cell at 14:50 to find him standing, with his bare chest puffed out in a gesture of defiance. Eicke and Lippert then shot Röhm, killing him. In 1957, the German authorities tried Lippert in Munich for Röhm's murder. Until then, Lippert had been one of the few executioners of the purge to evade trial. Lippert was convicted and sentenced to 18 months in prison.

== Aftermath ==
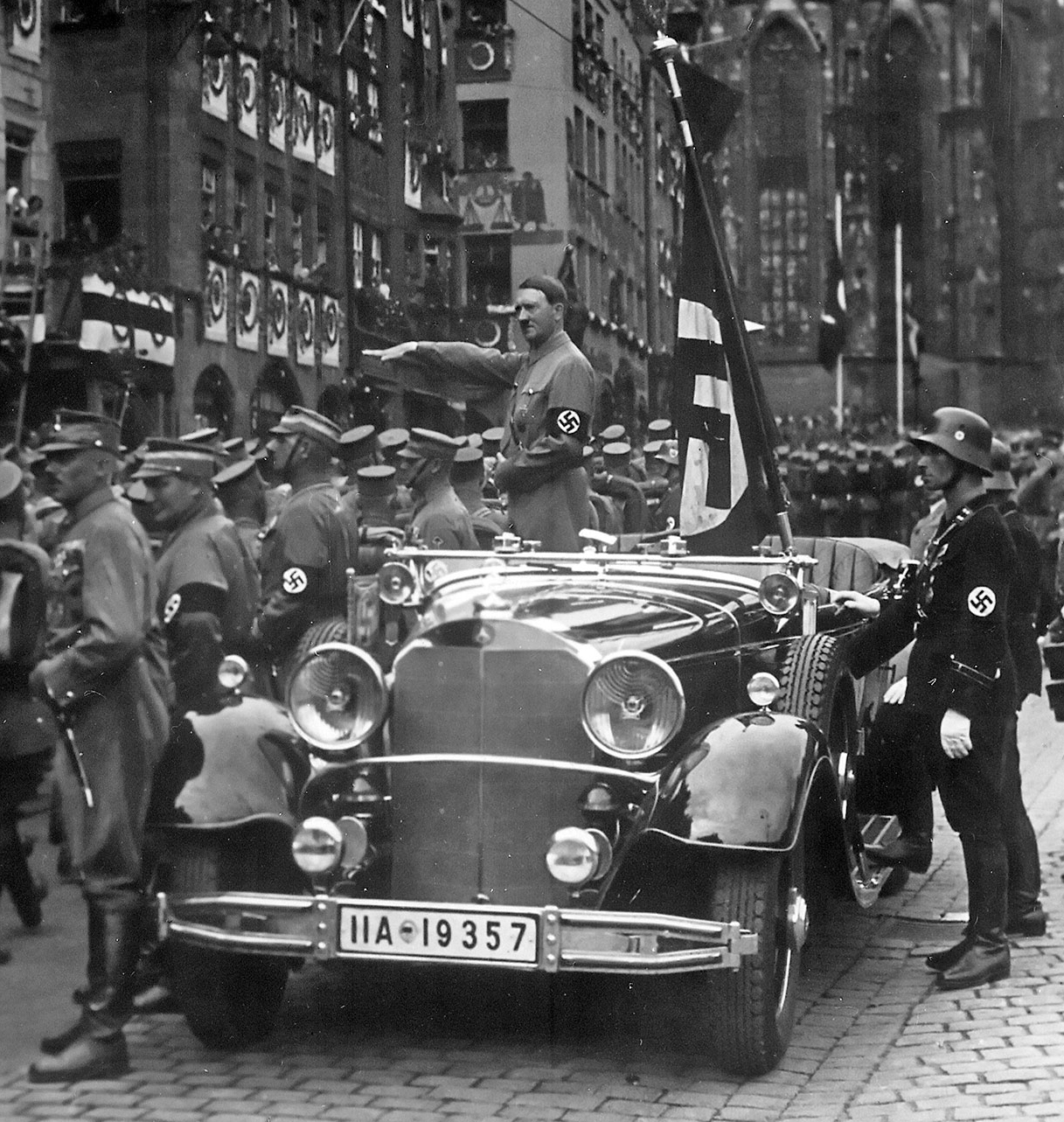
Hitler is triumphant as the Führer, reviewing the SA in 1935. In the car with him is the Blutfahne, behind the car SS-Sturmbannführer Jakob Grimminger.

Given that the purge claimed the lives of so many prominent Germans, it could hardly be kept secret. At first, its architects seemed split on how to handle the event. Göring instructed police stations to burn "all documents concerning the action of the past two days". Meanwhile, Goebbels tried to prevent newspapers from publishing lists of the dead, but at the same time used a 2 July radio address to describe how Hitler had narrowly prevented Röhm from overthrowing the government and throwing the country into turmoil. Then, on 13 July 1934, Hitler justified the purge in a nationally broadcast speech to the Reichstag:

If anyone reproaches me and asks why I did not resort to the regular courts of justice, then all I can say is this. In this hour I was responsible for the fate of the German people, and thereby I became the supreme judge of the German people. I gave the order to shoot the ringleaders in this treason, and I further gave the order to cauterise down to the raw flesh the ulcers of this poisoning of the wells in our domestic life. Let the nation know that its existence – which depends on its internal order and security – cannot be threatened with impunity by anyone! And let it be known for all time to come that if anyone raises his hand to strike the State, then certain death is his lot.

Wanting to present the massacre as legally sanctioned, Hitler had the cabinet approve a measure on 3 July that declared, "The measures taken on June 30, July 1 and 2 to suppress treasonous assaults are legal as acts of self-defence by the State." Reich Justice Minister Franz Gürtner, a conservative who had been Bavarian Justice Minister in the years of the Weimar Republic, demonstrated his loyalty to the new regime by drafting the statute, which added a legal veneer to the purge. (Note: According to Kershaw (1999), Gürtner also declared in cabinet that the measure did not in fact create any new law, but simply confirmed the existing law. If that was indeed true then, as a legal matter, the law was entirely unnecessary and redundant.) Signed into law by Hitler, Gürtner, and Minister of the Interior Wilhelm Frick, the "Law Regarding Measures of State Self-Defence" retroactively legalized the murders committed during the purge. Germany's legal establishment further capitulated to the regime when the country's leading legal scholar, Carl Schmitt, wrote an article defending Hitler's 13 July speech. It was named Der Führer schützt das Recht ("The Führer Upholds the Law").

A special fund administered by SS General Franz Breithaupt was set up for the relatives of the murdered, from which they were cared for at the expense of the state. The widows of the murdered SA leaders received between 1,000 and 1,600 marks a month, depending on the rank of the murdered person. Kurt von Schleicher's stepdaughter received 250 marks per month up to the age of 21, and the son of General von Bredow received a monthly allowance of 150 marks.

=== Reaction ===
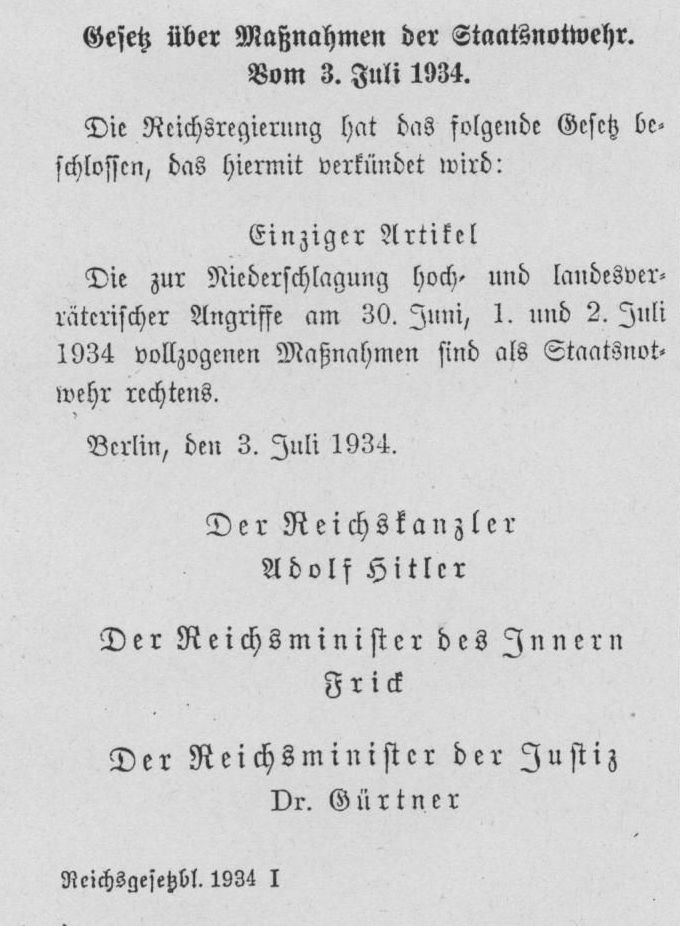
Law Relating to National Emergency Defense Measures, 3 July 1934

The army almost unanimously applauded the Night of the Long Knives, even though the generals Kurt von Schleicher and Ferdinand von Bredow were among the victims. A telegram purportedly from the ailing Hindenburg, Germany's highly revered military hero, expressed his "profoundly felt gratitude", and congratulated Hitler for "nipping treason in the bud", although Hermann Göring later admitted during the Nuremberg trials that the telegram was never seen by Hindenburg, and was actually written by the Nazis. General von Reichenau went so far as to publicly give credence to the lie that Schleicher had been plotting to overthrow the government. In his speech to the Reichstag on 13 July justifying his actions, Hitler denounced Schleicher for conspiring with Röhm to overthrow the government; Hitler alleged both were traitors working in the pay of France. Since Schleicher was a good friend of the French Ambassador André François-Poncet, and because of his reputation for intrigue, the claim that Schleicher was working for France had enough surface plausibility for most Germans to accept it; nevertheless François-Poncet was not declared persona non grata as would have been usual if an ambassador were involved in a plot against his host government.

The army's support for the purge, however, would have far-reaching consequences for the institution. The humbling of the SA ended the threat it had posed to the army, but, by standing by Hitler during the purge, the army bound itself more tightly to the Nazi regime. One retired captain, Erwin Planck, seemed to realize this: "If you look on without lifting a finger", he said to his friend, General Werner von Fritsch, "you will meet the same fate sooner or later." Another rare exception was Field Marshal August von Mackensen, who spoke about the murders of Schleicher and Bredow at the annual General Staff Society meeting in February 1935 after they had been rehabilitated by Hitler in early January 1935.

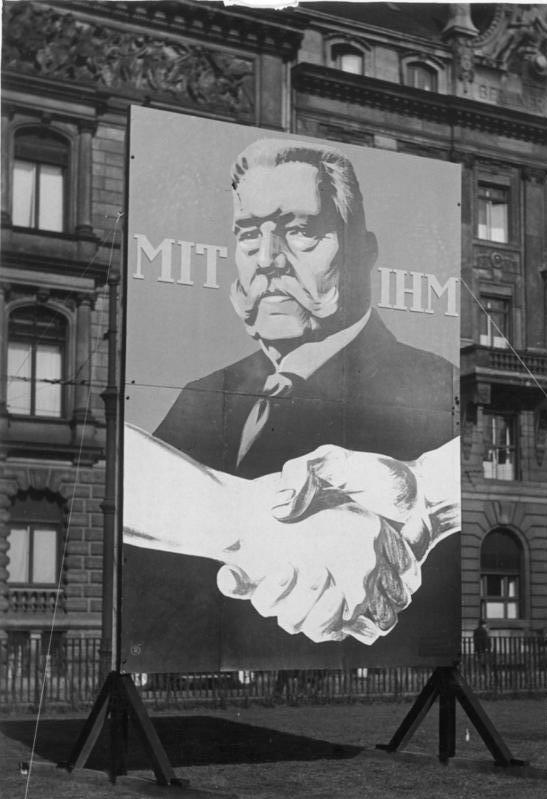
Election poster for Hindenburg in 1932 (translation: "With him")

Rumours about the Night of the Long Knives rapidly spread. Although many Germans approached the official news of the events as described by Joseph Goebbels with a great deal of scepticism, many others took the regime at its word, and believed that Hitler had saved Germany from a descent into chaos. (Note: Kershaw (2001) writes: "It was plain that there was wide acceptance of the deliberately misleading propaganda put out by the regime.") Luise Solmitz, a Hamburg schoolteacher, echoed the sentiments of many Germans when she cited Hitler's "personal courage, decisiveness and effectiveness" in her private diary. She even compared him to Frederick the Great, the 18th-century king of Prussia.

Others were appalled at the scale of the executions and at the relative complacency of many of their fellow Germans. "A very calm and easy going mailman," the diarist Victor Klemperer wrote, "who is not at all National Socialist, said, 'Well, he simply sentenced them.'" It did not escape Klemperer's notice that many of the victims had played a role in bringing Hitler to power. "A chancellor", he wrote, "sentences and shoots members of his own private army!" The extent of the massacre and the relative ubiquity of the Gestapo, however, meant that those who disapproved of the purge generally kept quiet about it.

Among the few exceptions were General Kurt von Hammerstein-Equord and Field Marshal August von Mackensen, who started a campaign to have Schleicher rehabilitated by Hitler. Hammerstein, who was a close friend of Schleicher, had been much offended at Schleicher's funeral when the SS refused to allow him to attend the service and confiscated the wreaths that the mourners had brought. Besides working for the rehabilitation of Schleicher and Bredow, Hammerstein and Mackensen sent a memo to Hindenburg on 18 July setting out in considerable detail the circumstances of the murders of the two generals and noted that Papen had barely escaped. The memo went on to demand that Hindenburg punish those responsible, and criticized Blomberg for his outspoken support of the murders of Schleicher and Bredow. Finally, Hammerstein and Mackensen asked that Hindenburg reorganize the government by firing Baron Konstantin von Neurath, Robert Ley, Hermann Göring, Werner von Blomberg, Joseph Goebbels and Richard Walther Darré from the Cabinet. The memo asked that Hindenburg instead create a directorate to rule Germany, comprising the Chancellor (who was not named), General Werner von Fritsch as Vice-Chancellor, Hammerstein as Minister of Defense, the Minister for National Economy (also unnamed), and Rudolf Nadolny as Foreign Minister. The request that Neurath be replaced by Nadolny, the former Ambassador to the USSR, who had resigned earlier that year in protest against Hitler's anti-Soviet foreign policy, indicated that Hammerstein and Mackensen wanted a return to the "distant friendliness" towards the Soviet Union that existed until 1933. Mackensen and Hammerstein ended their memo with:

Excellency, the gravity of the moment has compelled us to appeal to you as our Supreme Commander. The destiny of our country is at stake. Your Excellency has thrice before saved Germany from foundering, at Tannenberg, at the end of the War and at the moment of your election as Reich President. Excellency, save Germany for the fourth time! The undersigned Generals and senior officers swear to preserve to the last breath their loyalty to you and the Fatherland.

Hindenburg never responded to the memo, and it remains unclear whether he even saw it, as Otto Meißner, who decided that his future was aligned with the Nazis, may not have passed it along. It is noteworthy that even those officers who were most offended by the killings, like Hammerstein and Mackensen, did not blame the purge on Hitler, whom they wanted to see continue as Chancellor; they at most wanted a reorganization of the Cabinet to remove some of Hitler's more radical followers.

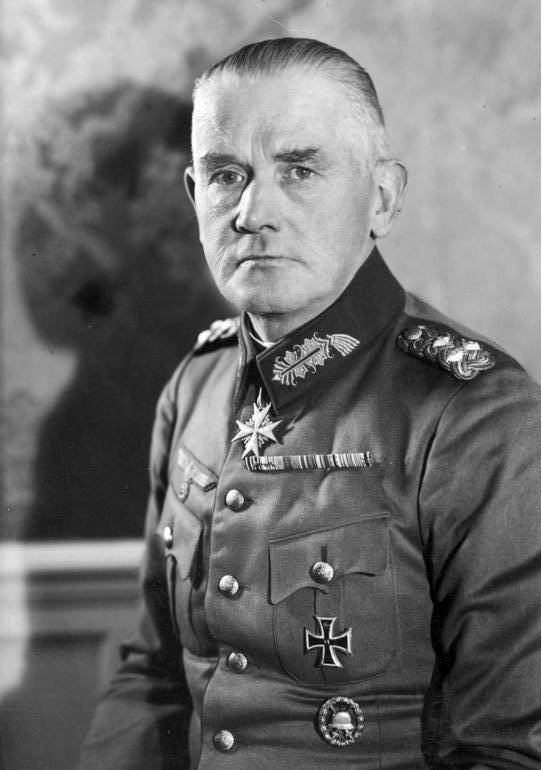
Werner von Blomberg in 1934

In late 1934–early 1935, Werner von Fritsch and Werner von Blomberg, who had been shamed into joining Hammerstein and Mackensen's rehabilitation campaign, successfully pressured Hitler into rehabilitating Generals von Schleicher and von Bredow. Fritsch and Blomberg suddenly now claimed at the end of 1934 that as army officers they could not stand the exceedingly violent press attacks on Schleicher and Bredow that had been going on since July, which portrayed them as the vilest traitors, working against the Fatherland in the pay of France. In a speech given on 3 January 1935, at the Berlin State Opera, Hitler stated that Schleicher and Bredow had been shot "in error" on the basis of false information, and that their names were to be restored to the honour rolls of their regiments at once. Hitler's speech was not reported in the German press, but the army was appeased by the speech. However, despite the rehabilitation of the two murdered officers, the Nazis continued in private to accuse Schleicher of high treason. During a trip to Warsaw in January 1935, Göring told Jan Szembek, Polish Undersecretary of State for Foreign Affairs, that Schleicher had urged Hitler in January 1933 to reach an understanding with France and the Soviet Union, and partition Poland with the latter, and Hitler had Schleicher killed out of disgust with the alleged advice. During a meeting with Polish Ambassador Józef Lipski on 22 May 1935, Hitler told Lipski that Schleicher was "rightfully murdered, if only because he had sought to maintain the 1922 Rapallo Treaty". The statements that Schleicher had been killed because he wanted to partition Poland with the Soviet Union were later published in the Polish White Book of 1939, which was a collection of diplomatic documents detailing German–Polish relations up to the outbreak of the war.

Former Kaiser Wilhelm II, who was in exile in Doorn, Netherlands, was horrified by the purge. He asked, "What would people have said if I had done such a thing?" Hearing of the murder of former Chancellor Kurt von Schleicher and his wife, he also commented, "We have ceased to live under the rule of law and everyone must be prepared for the possibility that the Nazis will push their way in and put them up against the wall!"

== SA leadership ==
Hitler named Viktor Lutze to replace Röhm as head of the SA. Hitler ordered him, as one prominent historian described it, to put an end to "homosexuality, debauchery, drunkenness, and high living" in the SA. Hitler expressly told him to stop SA funds from being spent on limousines and banquets, which he considered evidence of SA extravagance. Lutze did little to assert the SA's independence in the coming years, and the organization lost its power in Germany. Its membership plummeted from 2.9 million in August 1934 to 1.2 million in April 1938.

According to Albert Speer, "the Right, represented by the President, the Minister of Justice, and the generals, lined up behind Hitler ... the strong left wing of the party, represented chiefly by the SA, was eliminated."

Röhm was purged from all Nazi propaganda, such as The Victory of Faith, the Leni Riefenstahl film about the 1933 Nuremberg rally, which showed Röhm frequently alongside Hitler. A copy of the original film, before Röhm was edited out, was found in the 1980s in the German Democratic Republic's film archives.

== Terminology ==
The term "long knives" as a metonym for treachery and violence had been used to describe the Treason of the Long Knives since this incident was recorded in the 9th century Historia Brittonum. This event reputedly occurred during the fifth century Anglo-Saxon settlement of Britain, when Vortigern and the British leaders were invited to discuss peace and the Saxon leader Hengist commanded his men to draw their Seax (the infamous long knives) and massacre the unarmed Britons. It would become known in Welsh as "twyll y cyllyll hirion" (English: Deceit of the long knives) (first recorded around 1587) and in English as the "Treachery/Plot/Treason of the long knives" (recorded around 1604). This story would be popularized across western Europe in the 12th century as part of the History of the Britons by Geoffrey of Monmouth, which introduced many of the Arthurian legends to Germany.

In the years preceding the purge, the term "long knives" had become a popular description of treachery in Germany and was used as a criticism of Nazi actions and deceitfulness.

However, the term was soon adopted by the Nazis themselves to invoke what they saw as justifiable and necessary measures taken by Germanic peoples against an enemy. In 1928, the popular Nazi song "Wetzt die langen Messer" (English: Sharpen the long knives) encourages the mass murder of Jews and the desecration of synagogues. The Nazi adoption of the phrase for an upcoming violent event was well known even to the foreign press, with the 2 August 1932 issue of The Times reporting that:

Prominent Nazi leaders have played upon the imaginations of their followers..with such phrases as 'the night of the long knives' and 'a vengeance for every Nazi killed'.

Also in 1932, the Nazi critic Carl von Ossietzky would use the term to describe the then-unrealised plans for a violent uprising:

At the beginning of 1932 the Nazis seemed on the verge of a dictatorship, and the air was full of the stench of blood. By the end of it, Hitler's party had been shaken by a major crisis, and the long knives were put quietly back in their box while all the Führer kept out was a wary ear.

Before its execution, the purge's instigators referred to the plans under the codename Hummingbird (German: Kolibri), the word used to command execution squads into action on 30 June. However, soon after the purge Hitler himself named the events the "Night of the long knives" in his public speech on 13 July 1934 defending the actions (despite the violence taking place over several days).

== Legacy ==
The Night of the Long Knives represented a triumph for Hitler, and a turning point for the German government. It established Hitler as "the supreme leader of the German people", as he put it in his 13 July speech to the Reichstag. Hitler formally adopted this title in April 1942, thus placing himself above the reach of the law de jure and de facto. Centuries of jurisprudence proscribing extrajudicial killings were swept aside. Despite some initial efforts by local prosecutors to take legal action against those who carried out the murders, which the regime rapidly quashed, it appeared that no law would constrain Hitler in his use of power. (Note: Evans (2005) writes: "After the 'Night of the Long Knives,' [Reich Minister for Justice Franz Gürtner] nipped in the bud the attempts of some local state prosecutors to initiate proceedings against the killers.")

Years later, in November 1945, while being interviewed by psychologist Gustave Gilbert in his cell during the Nuremberg trials, Göring angrily justified the killings to Gilbert, "It's a damn good thing I wiped them out, or they would have wiped us out!"

== In literature and the arts ==
- The Damned (1969 film), dramatizes the Night of the Long Knives
- "The Last Day of June 1934", 1974 song on Past, Present and Future (Al Stewart album)
- "Night of the Long Knives" 1981 song on AC/DC's album For Those About to Rock We Salute You
- A Night of Long Knives, 2010 novel by Rebecca Cantrell
- Night of the Long Knives, song by the English band Everything Everything in their 2017 album A Fever Dream
- The climax of the Marvel Comics limited series, Red Skull: Incarnate, takes place during the Night of the Long Knives. Johann Shmidt kills his only friend, stopping him from assassinating Adolf Hitler.
- "Night Of The Long Pipes", 2021 album and song by the Hungarian psychedelic metal band Edelweiss.

== See also ==
- Glossary of Nazi Germany
- Kristallnacht, 'night of broken glass'
- List of Nazi Party leaders and officials
- White Book of the Purge, a 1934 nonfiction book about the Night of the Long Knives

== Bibliography ==
- Bessel, Richard (1984). Political Violence and the Rise of Nazism: The Storm Troopers in Eastern Germany 1925–1934. New Haven, CT: Yale University Press. ISBN 978-0-300-03171-3.
- Bullock, Alan (1958). Hitler: A Study in Tyranny. New York: Harper.
- Collier, Martin; Pedley, Phillip (2005). Hitler and the Nazi State. New York: Harcourt. ISBN 978-0-435-32709-5.
- Cook, Stan; Bender, Roger James (1994). Leibstandarte SS Adolf Hitler: Uniforms, Organization, & History. San Jose, CA: James Bender Publishing. ISBN 978-0-912138-55-8.
- Evans, Richard (2005). The Third Reich in Power. New York: Penguin Group. ISBN 978-0-14-303790-3.
- Fest, Joachim C. (1974). Hitler. Translated by Winston, Richard; Winston, Clara (1st ed.). New York: Harcourt. ISBN 0-15-141650-8. LCCN 73018154. OCLC 1149492737. OL 5424037M. Wikidata Q141783856.
- Frei, Norbert (1987). National Socialist Rule in Germany: The Führer State 1933–1945. Oxford: Oxford University Press. ISBN 978-0-631-18507-9.
- Gallo, Max (1972). The Night of the Long Knives. New York: Harper & Row. ISBN 9780060113971.
- Gilbert, Gustave (1995). Nuremberg Diary. New York: Da Capo Press – reprinted with arrangement of original publishers Farrar, Straus & Giroux. ISBN 0-306-80661-4.
- Gisevius, Hans Bernd (1947). To the Bitter End. New York: Houghton Mifflin.
- Gunther, John (1940). Inside Europe. New York: Harper & Brothers.
- Hitler, Adolf (1941). Sales, Raoul De Roussy de (ed.). My New Order. New York: Reynal & Hitchcock. LCCN 41015818.
- Höhne, Heinz (1970). The Order of the Death's Head: The Story of Hitler's SS. New York: Coward-McCann. ISBN 978-0-14-139012-3.
- Johnson, Paul (1991). Modern Times – the World from the Twenties to the Nineties. New York City: HarperCollins. ISBN 978-0-06-016833-9.
- Kershaw, Ian (1999). Hitler: 1889–1936 Hubris. New York: W. W. Norton & Company. ISBN 978-0-393-32035-0.
- Kershaw, Ian (2001). The "Hitler Myth": Image and Reality in the Third Reich. Oxford: Oxford University Press. ISBN 978-0-19-280206-4.
- Kershaw, Ian (2008). Hitler: A Biography. New York City: W. W. Norton & Company. ISBN 978-0-393-06757-6. LCCN 2008037294. OCLC 1285564274. OL 22551194M. Wikidata Q138306767.
- Klemperer, Victor (1998). I Will Bear Witness: The Diaries of Victor Klemperer. New York: Random House. ISBN 978-0-679-45696-4.
- Layton, Roland V. (1979). "Kurt Ludecke and "I Knew Hitler": An Evaluation". Central European History. 12 (4): 372–386. doi:10.1017/S0008938900022470. ISSN 0008-9389. JSTOR 4545876.
- Lengyel, Emil (28 November 1937). "An Inside View of the Nazis by a Former Party Member; Kurt Ludecke, Once Director of Propaganda—in the United States. Escaped the Famous Blood Purge". The New York Times. ISSN 0362-4331.
- Larson, Erik (2011). In the Garden of Beasts. New York: Broadway Paperbacks. ISBN 978-0-307-40885-3, citing:
  - Memoranda in the W. E. Dodd papers
  - Wheeler-Bennett (1953), p. 323
  - Gallo (1972), pp. 256, 258
  - Rürup (1996), pp. 53, 223
  - Kershaw (1999), p. 515
  - Evans (2005), pp. 34–36
  - Strasser & Stern (1943), pp. 252, 263
  - Gisevius (1947), p. 153
  - Metcalfe (1988), p. 269
- Macdonogh, Giles (2001). The Last Kaiser: William the Impetuous. London: Weidenfeld & Nicolson. ISBN 978-1-84212-478-9.
- Messenger, Charles (2005). Hitler's Gladiator: The Life and Wars of Panzer Army Commander Sepp Dietrich. London. pp. 204–205. ISBN 978-1-84486-022-7.
- Metcalfe, Phillip (1988). 1933. Sag Harbor, New York: Permanent Press.
- O'Neill, Robert (1967). The German Army and the Nazi Party 1933–1939. New York: James H. Heineman. ISBN 978-0-685-11957-0.
- Reiche, Eric G. (2002). The Development of the SA in Nürnberg, 1922–1934. Cambridge: Cambridge University Press. ISBN 978-0-521-52431-5.
- Rürup, Reinhard, ed. (1996). Topography of Terror: SS, Gestapo and Reichssichherheitshauptamt on the 'Prinz-Albrecht-Terrain': A Documentation. Berlin: Verlag Willmuth Arenhovel.
- Schmitt, Carl (1 August 1934). "The Führer Protects the Law". pdfslide.us. Archived from the original on 1 March 2020.
- Schoenbaum, David (1997). Hitler's Social Revolution: Class and Status in Nazi Germany, 1933–1939. W. W. Norton & Company. ISBN 978-0-393-31554-7.
- Schwarzmüller, Theo (1995). Zwischen Kaiser und "Führer": Generalfeldmarschall August von Mackensen, eine politische Biographie. Dtv (in German). Paderborn. ISBN 978-3-423-30823-6.
- Shirer, William L. (1960). The Rise and Fall of the Third Reich. New York: Simon & Schuster. LCCN 60-6729.
- Speer, Albert (1995). Inside the Third Reich. London: Weidenfeld & Nicolson. ISBN 978-1-84212-735-3.
- "Der Furcht so Fern, dem Tod so Nah'" [Fear So Far Away, Death So Near]. Der Spiegel (in German) (20/1957). 15 May 1957. Archived from the original on 13 June 2020.
- Spielvogel, Jackson J. (1996). Hitler and Nazi Germany: A History. New York: Prentice Hall. ISBN 978-0-13-189877-6.
- Stackelberg, Roderick; Winkle, Sally A. (2002). The Nazi Germany Sourcebook: An Anthology of Texts. New York: Routledge. ISBN 9780415222143.
- Strasser, Otto; Stern, Michael (1943). Flight from Terror. New York: Robert M. McBride.
- The Waffen-SS. Gladiators of World War II. World Media Rights. 2002.
- "Books: Nazi Salvage". Time. 15 November 1937. ISSN 0040-781X.
- Trimborn, Jürgen (2008). Leni Riefenstahl: A Life. New York: Farrar, Straus and Giroux. ISBN 978-1-4668-2164-4.
- Toland, John (1976). Adolf Hitler: The Definitive Biography. New York: Doubleday. ISBN 978-0-385-42053-2.
- "The German Churches and the Nazi State". United States Holocaust Memorial Museum. n.d.
- Wheeler-Bennett, John (1967). The Nemesis of Power: The German Army in Politics 1918–1945.
- Wheeler-Bennett, John (2005). The Nemesis of Power: The German Army in Politics 1918–1945 (2nd ed.). Palgrave Macmillan. ISBN 978-1-4039-1812-3.
- Williams, Max (2001). Reinhard Heydrich: The Biography, Volume 1 – Road To War. Church Stretton: Ulric Publishing. ISBN 978-0-9537577-5-6.
- Papen, Franz von (1953). Memoirs. London: Dutton. ASIN B0007DRFHQ.
- Wheeler-Bennett, John W. (1953). The Nemesis of Power: the German Army in Politics 1918–1945. London: Macmillan. p. 323.
