= Schönbeck (surname) =

Schönbeck is a surname. Notable people with the surname include:

- Christoph Andreas Johann Szembek or Schönbeck (1680–1740), Bishop of Ermland 1724-1740
- Florian Schönbeck (born 1974), German decathlete
- Jan Szembek or Schönbeck (died 1731), Deputy Chancellor of the Polish Crown
- Jan Szembek (diplomat) or Schönbeck, diplomat of the Second Polish Republic
- Rudolf Schönbeck (1919–2003), German football player
