= Czesław Idźkiewicz =

Polish painter and art teacher (1889–1951)

- Born: October 21, 1889; Różan, Poland
- Died: February 1, 1951 (aged 61)
- Education: School of Fine Arts in Warsaw; Jan Matejko Academy of Fine Arts; Royal Academy of Fine Arts (Antwerp)
- Occupations: Painter, teacher

Czesław Idźkiewicz (October 21, 1889 – February 1, 1951) was a Polish painter and teacher.

== Biography ==
Idźkiewicz was born in Różan to Piotr and Aleksandra (née Magnuszewska). He was one of six children of the local organist Piotr Idźkiewicz. He went to school in Pułtusk nearby. Between 1908 and 1912, Idźkiewicz studied drawing and painting at the School of Fine Arts in Warsaw. At the same time he assisted in the painting of frescoes at Płock Cathedral. In 1912, he went to Antwerp to study at the Academie Royale de Beaux Arts, and in 1913 and 1914 he continued his studies in Kraków at the Academy of Fine Arts as a student of Józef Mehoffer and Józef Pankiewicz.

During the First World War, the principal painter of the Masovian Blessed Virgin Mary Cathedral in Płock, Władysław Drapiewski, was exiled, and Idźkiewicz continued the work on the royal chapel there on his own. He made a living as teacher of fine arts at the local preparatory school and subsequently obtained high-school educator certification. After the invasion of Poland in 1939, the entire collection of oil paintings by Idźkiewicz was stolen by the Nazis and shipped to Germany. It was never recovered; only a few of his artworks remain. He was arrested and sent to Dachau concentration camp near Munich. Idźkiewicz survived the war, and settled back in Płock. He worked as an educator until his unexpected death on February 1, 1951, aged 61.

== Notes and references ==
- Zienkiewicz H. (1963). "Czesław Idźkiewicz - Artysta malarz i wychowawca młodzieży", Notatki Płockie: 39-40 (Towarzystwo Naukowe Płockie).
