= Edgar Jung =

German jurist and essayist (1894–1934)

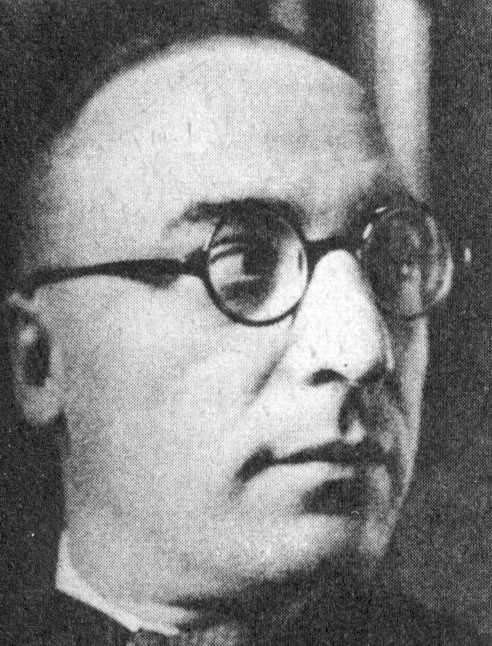
Jung, c. 1925

Edgar Julius Jung (pen name: Tyll; 6 March 1894 – 1 July 1934) was a German lawyer born in Ludwigshafen in the Kingdom of Bavaria. He was a leader of the conservative revolutionary movement in Germany that stood in opposition to not only the Weimar Republic, whose parliamentarian system he considered decadent and foreign-imposed, but also National Socialism. Jung was murdered in the 1934 Night of the Long Knives purge.

== Career ==
At the onset of World War I, Jung voluntarily joined the imperial armies and reached the rank of lieutenant. After the war, he participated in the suppression of the Bavarian Soviet Republic in the spring of 1919 and in the resistance against the French occupation of the Palatinate, during which he participated in the assassination of Franz Josef Heinz. Expelled by the French authorities, Jung moved to Munich, where in 1925 he opened a law firm and dampened his political activism slightly.

Like Carl Schmitt, Jung believed the breakdown of liberal parliamentarism to be inevitable as the instability of Weimar Germany was unfolding before his eyes. Jung regarded Weimar Germany as teetering on the brink of revolutionary turmoil with the very real prospect of a "Red Revolution" sponsored by the Soviet Union or a "Brown Revolution" by the Nazi Party. Jung claimed that "the Jew" had sided with Enlightenment and individualism since the beginning of the emancipation debate "in order to undermine the edifice of German state building from within". Now, it was "no longer a question of faith, but of ethnicity", and so for the Jews in Germany, only two options remained: emigrate or be reduced to the status of a "national minority".

After the formation of the "government of national concentration" under the leadership of Adolf Hitler on 30 January 1933, Jung became a political consultant and speechwriter for the vice-chancellor of the coalition cabinet, Franz von Papen.

== Marburg speech ==
In 1934, Jung wrote the Marburg speech that was delivered on 17 June by Papen at the University of Marburg. The speech articulated the conservative establishment's criticism of the violence of Nazism. The text sought to reassert the Christian foundation of the state and the need to avoid agitation and propaganda: "It is time", the speech declared, "to join together in fraternal friendship and respect for all our fellow countrymen, to avoid disturbing the labours of serious men and to silence fanatics". The speech was banned by the NSDAP from being printed in the press.

== Death ==
Hitler personally ordered the arrest of Jung. He was arrested in his Berlin apartment by the Gestapo; he had been packing bags in an attempt to flee to Switzerland. Jung was transferred to Gestapo headquarters at Prinz-Albrecht-Straße. He was murdered by the SS shortly thereafter, being shot in the cellar at Gestapo headquarters. His body was found dumped in a ditch near the town of Oranienburg near Berlin on 1 July.

== Works ==
The Rule of the Inferiour: Its Disintegration and Removal Through a New Reich is his major political treatise which was originally published in 1930 as Die Herrschaft der Minderwertigen, ihr Zerfall und ihre Ablösung durch ein neues Reich ("Inferiour" is an obsolete spelling of "Inferior"). The translator, Alexander Jacob, produced the first and only English edition in 1995 with a large introduction and notes, sold in two volumes; the first volume being 428 pages and the second 396 pages.

Jung expressed his views in a condensed form in his book An der Schwelle einer neuen Zeit (On the Threshold of a New Era). In its 21 chapters, Jung covered various topics, including the family, the economy, and demographic policy. A translation of the book by Victor Van Brandt was published by the far-right publisher Imperium Press in 2023.

In Sinndeutung der deutschen Revolution (1933), Jung declared that "violence is an element of life" and that "a nation that has become incapable of employing violence must be suspected of biological decline". A translation, also by Alexander Jacob, was published by Arktos Media in 2022.

== See also ==
- Herbert von Bose
- Erich Klausener
