= White Book of the Purge =

1934 book about Night of the Long Knives

- Subject: Night of the Long Knives
- Genre: Non-fiction
- Publication date: 1934

The White Book of the Purge (German: Weissbuch über die Erschiessungen des 30 Juni 1934, French: Livre blanc sur les fusillades du 30 juin) was a 1934 book published by German émigrés in Paris about the Nazi purge known as the Night of the Long Knives. It named 116 people who had been killed in the purge, asserting that 401 in total had died.
