= Herbert von Bose =

German politician

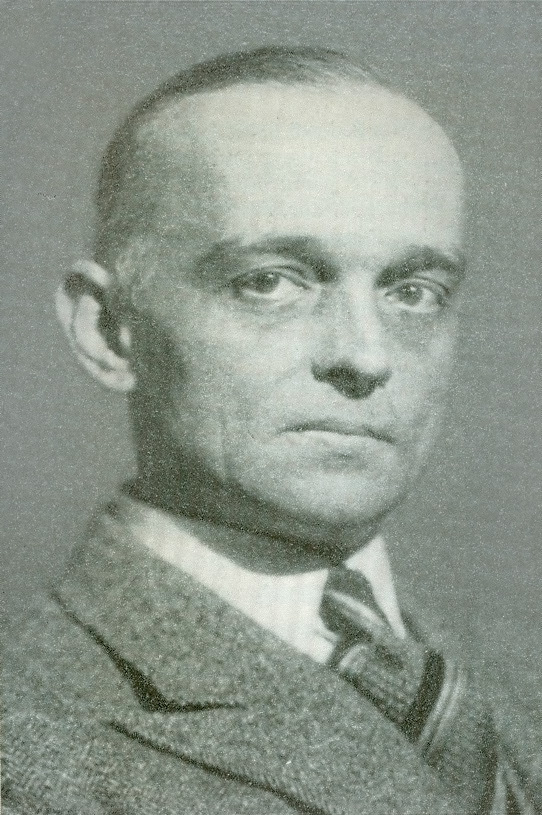
Herbert von Bose in early 1934

Carl Fedor Eduard Herbert von Bose (16 March 1893, Straßburg – 30 June 1934, Berlin) was head of the press division of the Vice Chancellery (Reichsvizekanzlei) in Germany under Vice Chancellor Franz von Papen. A conservative opponent of the Nazi regime, Bose was murdered during the Night of the Long Knives in the summer of 1934.

== Life and activities ==
=== Imperial Germany and Weimar Republic (1893–1933) ===
During the First World War, Bose served as an intelligence officer in the Imperial German Army. After the war, Bose participated in the suppression of the German Revolution. He continued to work in the field of intelligence gathering and espionage, first for the Black Reichswehr and later for the private Telegraph Union, a company owned by the politician and media mogul Alfred Hugenberg. In 1931 Bose was summoned to the Prussian State Ministry, where he was assigned to head the Press Department. On top of that he acted as a right-hand-man of the conservative politician Otto Schmidt-Hannover (DNVP). In the autumn of 1931 Bose organised the so-called "Harzburger Tagung" (Harzburg conference) a gathering of right-wing political forces including the Nazi Party, the DNVP, the Agrarian Federation, and the paramilitary Stahlhelm.

Although a confirmed anti-communist and skeptical about the functionality of democracy as a form of government, Bose at that time came to reject National Socialism as a possible cure for the political ailments of Germany on various grounds, not the least of which was his personal detestation of the Nazi Party leader Adolf Hitler, whom he deemed a vulgar rabble-rouser.

=== Oppositional activities (1933–1934) ===
In early 1933 Bose was appointed as chief of the Press Division in the office of Hitler's vice-chancellor Franz von Papen. Since Papen failed in the task he had been assigned by Reichspresident von Hindenburg, to act as a "chaperon" and corrective of Hitler and the other radicals in the government, Bose and other leading men on Papen's staff decided to take care of that task themselves. Together with his assistant Wilhelm Freiherr von Ketteler, Papen's speech writer and spin doctor Edgar Jung, and Papen's aides Fritz Günther von Tschirschky and Hans Reinhard Graf von Kageneck, Bose formed a pocket of resistance against the National Socialist system that was later referred to as "the vanguard of conservative resistance".

In order to overthrow the not-yet fully consolidated regime, Bose and his colleagues plotted to create an atmosphere of critical political tensions in Germany that would allow them to prompt the old president von Hindenburg – who retained the position of Commander in Chief of the Germany Army – to declare a state of national emergency. As a consequence, the Hitler government was to be stripped of the executive power in Germany, which Hindenburg was to take over by himself, in practice to be exercised by Papen's aides themselves and the Generals, for the Reichswehr. The army was to disarm the SA- and SS-troopers by force and to apprehend the major Nazi leaders, except for Hitler and Göring. Those two were to join a Reich-directorate that was to consist of Papen, former Chancellor Heinrich Brüning, conservative politician Carl Friedrich Goerdeler, the two Nazi leaders and the General Werner Freiherr von Fritsch. The ulterior motive of this action was to be a tactical one: to calm the masses of Nazi-supporters and prevent them from resorting to active resistance against the conservative coup. Hitler and Göring were supposed to be jettisoned somewhere along the track as soon as the position of their conservative counterparts had consolidated.

In early June 1934 that plan was jeopardized when Hindenburg – earlier than in previous years – left Berlin for his estate at Neudeck in East Prussia, thus becoming harder to contact. On top of that problem, it had recently become clear that Hindenburg was seriously ill and probably had only a few more weeks to live, so could not be expected to return from Neudeck at all. Pressured by this turn of events, Bose and his colleagues decided to accelerate the eruption of the smouldering crisis that existed in Germany in those months due to the conflict between Hitler's SA, which demanded to be promoted to the position of Germany's regular army, and the Reichswehr, which intended to defend its own status.

While Bose and Tschirschky were drawing up a special dossier that was to be handed over to the elderly Hindenburg in late June 1934, to convince him of the necessity of mobilising the Reichswehr against the SA and the Nazi Party, Papen delivered his famed address at the University of Marburg on 17 June 1934, which criticized some of the excesses of Nazi rule and called for a cessation of violence and the return of the rule of law. This speech, delivered by Papen but unbeknownst to the public actually written by Jung, was intended to serve as a signal to all opposition forces in Germany to prepare to rise up against National Socialism and simultaneously to enforce the escalation of the tensions between the SA and the Reichswehr, to underline for Hindenburg the thesis presented in the Bose-Tschirschky Dossier.

However, even though the Marburg Speech turned out to be a success – as the American ambassador to Berlin William Dodd noted in those days the provocative greeting "Heil Marburg" quickly became omnipresent in Germany – the plan by Bose, Jung, and Tschirschky did not come to fruition: The golden opportunity of the situation was thrown away by the tentative attitude of Papen, who could not bring himself to travel to Hindenburg immediately after the success of the speech became obvious, and by the clumsiness of Hindenburg's son, who clumsily spilled the beans about the Bose-Tschirschky Plan to the Army Minister, Blomberg, and his chief of staff, Reichenau, who was in league with Heinrich Himmler and Reinhard Heydrich.

On the morning of 30 June, between 10:00 am and 11:00 am, only a few hours before Papen intended finally to fly to Neudeck to get the support of Hindenburg, the Vice-Chancellery was occupied by an SS-squad and a few Gestapo inspectors. Bose was conducted into a conference room – allegedly to be interrogated – and shot ten times from behind as he sat down. Tschirschky was arrested and later released, while Jung – who had already been arrested on 25 June – was shot later that day. The whole event took place as a part of the Night of the Long Knives which developed during the remainder of the same day, 30 June 1934.

In his memoirs Inside the Third Reich, Albert Speer relates how he was ordered to rebuild the Borsig Palace, to transfer the leaders of the Sturmabteilung (SA) in, and to have all Papen's staff out, within twenty-four hours. Speer writes:

"Twenty-four hours later they moved out. In one of the rooms I saw a large pool of dried blood on the floor. There, on 30 June, Herbert von Bose, one of Papen's assistants, had been shot. I looked away and from then on avoided the room. But the incident did not affect me any more deeply than that."

== Literature ==
- Larry Eugene Jones: "The Limits of Collaboration. Edgar Jung, Herbert von Bose, and the Origins of the Conservative Resistance to Hitler, 1933-34", in: Larry Eugene Jones/ James Retallack [Eds.]: Between Reform, Reaction, and Resistance. Studies in the History of German Conservatism from 1789 to 1945, Providence 1993, pp. 465–501.
- Rainer Orth: "Der Amtssitz der Opposition"?: Politik und Staatsumbaupläne im Büro des Stellvertreters des Reichskanzlers in den Jahren 1933–1934, Böhlau, Cologne 2016.

== See also ==
- Borsig Palace
- Edgar Julius Jung
- Erich Klausener
- Franz von Papen
- Night of the Long Knives

== Notes ==
1. Speer, Albert (1970). Inside the Third Reich. The MacMillan Company. p. 53. ISBN 0-684-82949-5.
