= Erich Klausener =

German politician and Catholic martyr

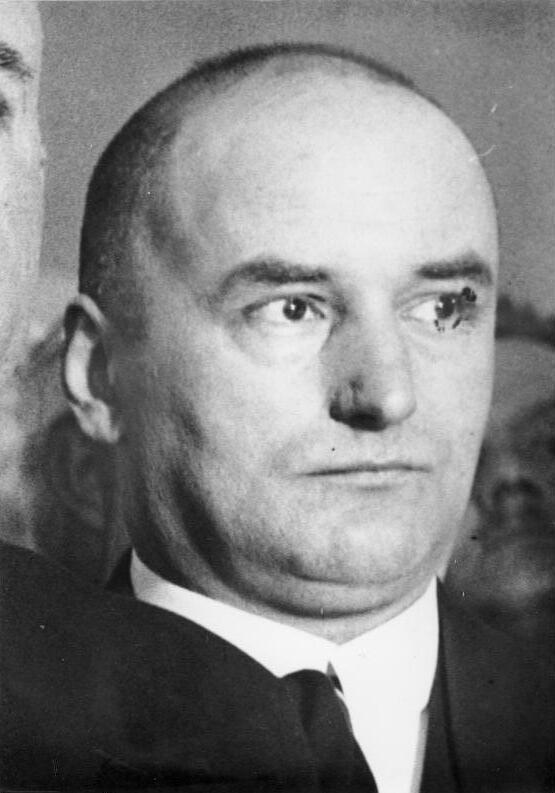
- Erich Klausener in 1933

Personal details
- Born: Erich Klausener; 25 January 1885 Düsseldorf, Kingdom of Prussia, German Empire
- Died: 30 June 1934 (aged 49) Berlin, Nazi Germany
- Parents: Peter Klausener (father); Elisabeth Biesenbach (mother)
- Profession: Politician; Professor
- Known for: Head of Catholic Action Berlin
- Religion: Roman Catholicism

Military service
- Allegiance: Kingdom of Prussia; German Empire
- Battles/wars: World War I

Erich Klausener (25 January 1885 – 30 June 1934) was a German Catholic politician and Catholic martyr in the "Night of the Long Knives", a purge that took place in Nazi Germany from 30 June to 2 July 1934, when the Nazi regime carried out a series of political murders.

== Family ==
Klausener was born in Düsseldorf to a Catholic family. His father, Peter Klausener (1844–1904), was a member of the Austrian Flirsch Klausener family, who came to the Rhineland in 1740, and are relatives of the Cluysenaar family. His father studied law and served as an assessor and justice of the peace in Malmedy, Prussia. His mother, Elisabeth Bisenbach (1864–1944), was from an upper-class family in Düsseldorf. Klausener followed his father's career in public service, serving for a time in the Prussian Ministry of Commerce. He served as an artillery officer in Belgium, France and on the eastern front of World War I, and was awarded the Iron Cross Second Class in 1914 and the Iron Cross First Class in 1917. During the French occupation of Ruhr, Klausener sent a letter to Belgian occupation authorities, criticizing the mistreatment of German police officers. In response, Klausener was arrested, tried by a Belgian court-martial, sentenced to two months in prison, and temporarily expelled from the Ruhr.

== Career ==
From 1924, Klausener served in Prussia in the Ministry of Welfare, and later headed the police division Ministry of Interior of that state. From 1928, Klausener became head of the group Catholic Action (Katholische Aktion). Before 1933, he strongly supported the police battle against illegal Nazi activities. After Adolf Hitler and Nazis came to power in 1933, Hermann Göring became minister-president of Prussia. Klausener was displaced from the ministry of transport of Prussia when Göring started to Nazify the Prussian police, and Klausener was transferred to the Reich Ministry of Transportation.

== Chair of Catholic Action Berlin ==
In 1928, Klausener joined the Katholischer Akademikerverband ('Catholic Academic Association') and was elected to its board. (Another sources states that Klausener "initiated" Catholic Action in Berlin in 1922 via encyclical Ubi Arcano)

== Assassination ==
A close associate of Vice Chancellor Franz von Papen, Klausener contributed to his Marburg speech delivered on 17 June 1934. The speech was largely written by Edgar Jung, but the contributions of Klausener and Secretary Herbert von Bose cost them their lives. The speech, though moderate in tone, criticized the violence and repression that had followed since Hitler became Chancellor. It called for an end to the revolution, Nazi terror and for the restoration of normalcy, freedom, and freedom of the press.

On 24 June 1934, Klausener spoke at the Catholic Congress in the Berlin's Hoppegarten. His passionate criticism of the repression was viewed by the Nazis as an open challenge.

Six days later, on 30 June 1934, during the "Night of the Long Knives", SS officer Kurt Gildisch was ordered by Reinhard Heydrich to go to Klausener's office at the Ministry of Transport to assassinate him. After the killing, Gildisch was promoted in rank to SS-Sturmbannführer.

=== Martyr ===
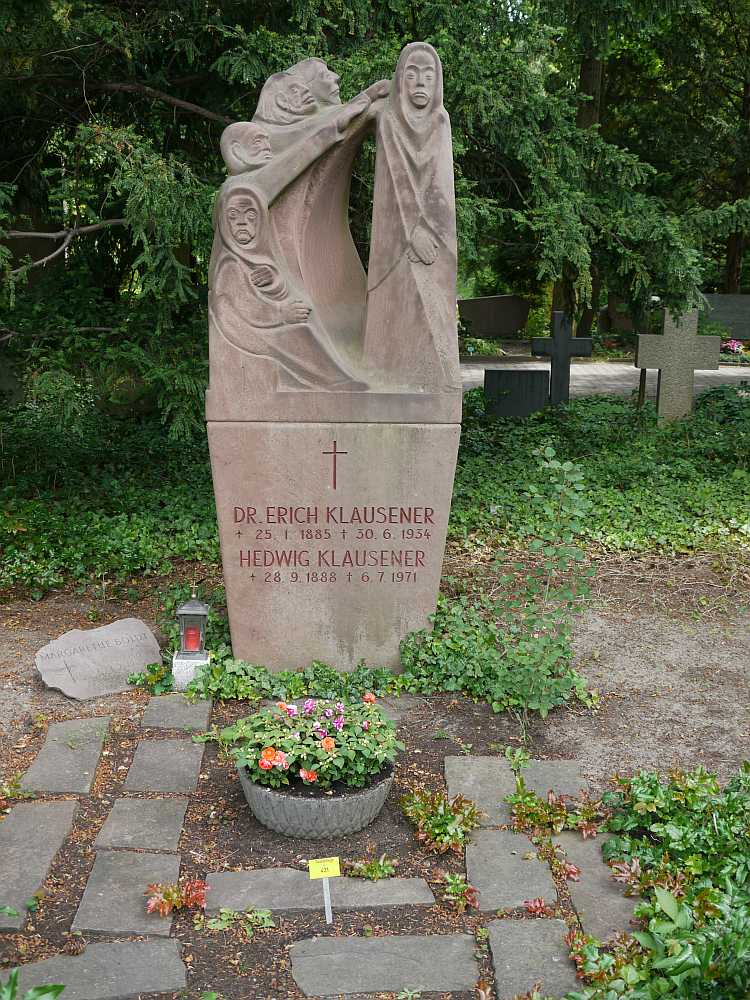
Klausener's Monument in the cemetery of St. Matthias Church, Berlin

After the end of the Nazi regime and after World War II, a monument was erected to Klausener in Berlin. In 1999, the Catholic Church in Germany accepted Klausener into the German martyrology as a witness of faith.

== Legacy ==
=== Tributes and memorials ===
- Erich-Klausener-Gymnasium in Adenau is named after him

Klausener had seven Straßen ('streets') named after him:

- Erich-Klausener-Straße, Düsseldorf
- Erich-Klausener-Straße, Neuss
- Erich-Klausener-Straße, Krefeld
- Erich-Klausener-Straße, Monheim am Rhein
- Erich-Klausener-Straße, Ludwigsfelde
- Erich-Klausener-Straße, Brieselang
- Erich-Klausener-Straße, Blankenfelde-Mahlow

Leo-Statz-Platz in Unterbilk, Düsseldorf

- Memorial stone
- Stolperstein

== Gallery ==
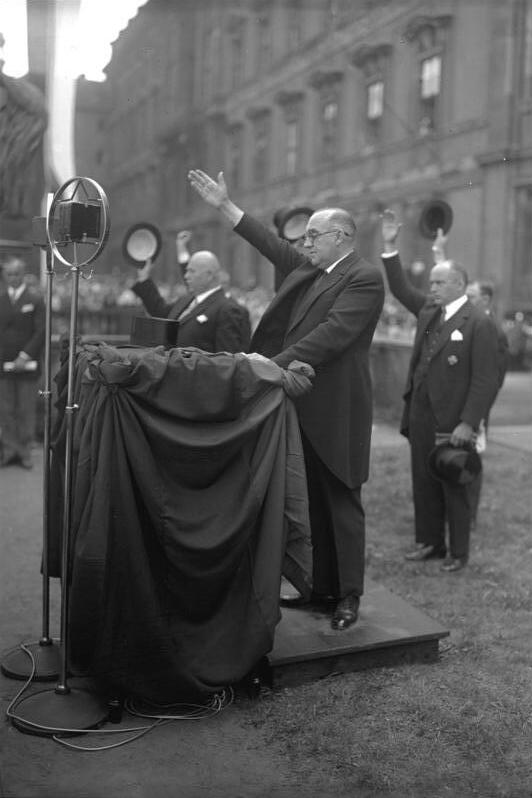
Klausener (Right) behind Prussian Interior Minister Albert Grzesinski (Centre) at the Constitutional Celebration of the Berlin Police in August 1929

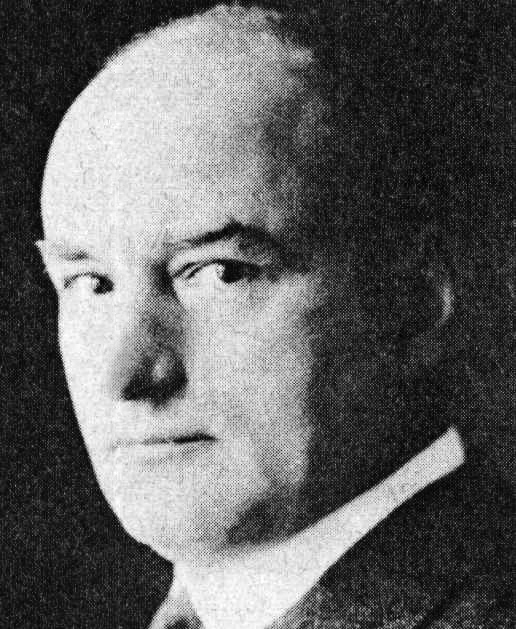
Klausener, c. 1928

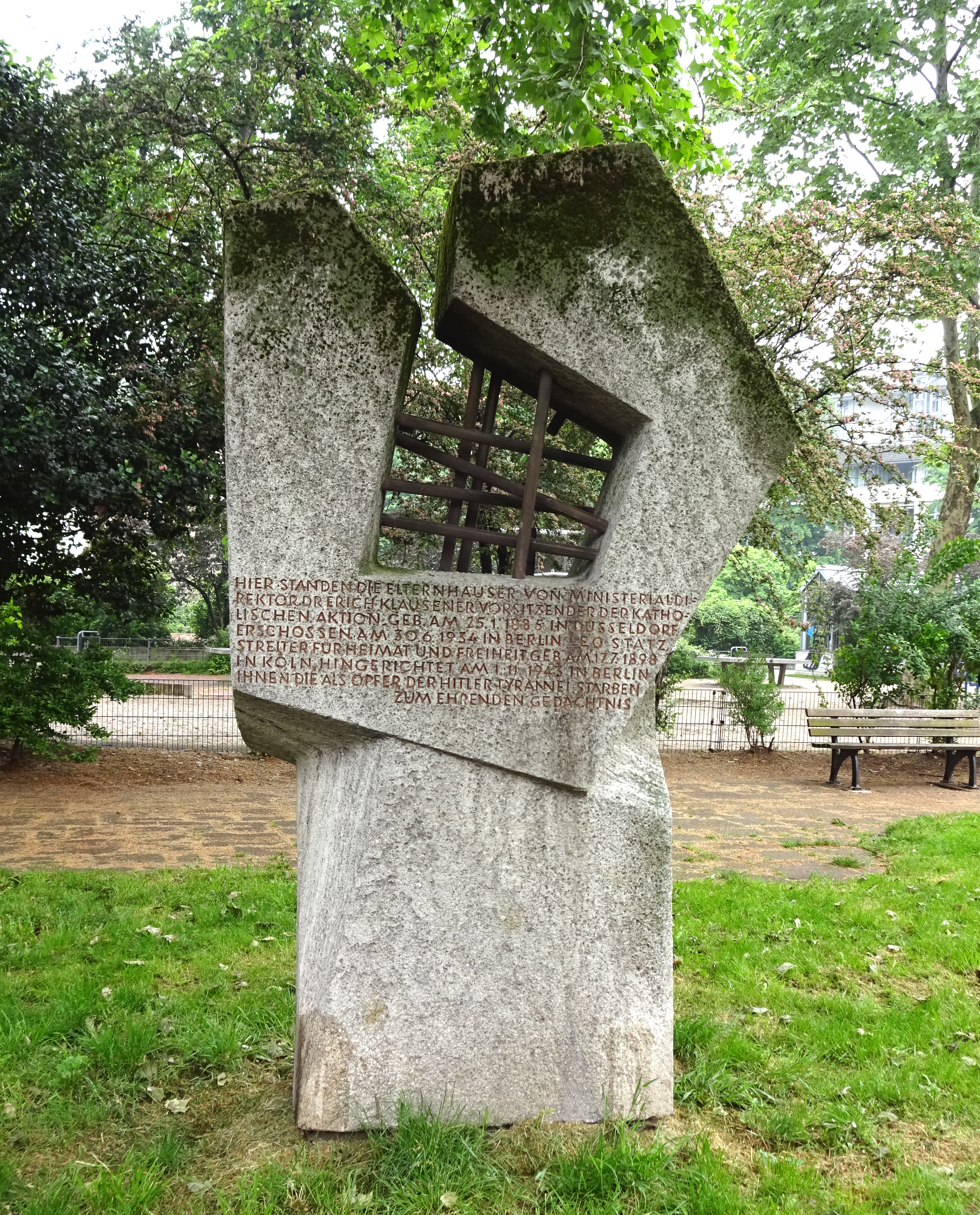
Memorial stone for Klausener and Leo Statz in Leo-Statz-Platz in Unterbilk, Düsseldorf

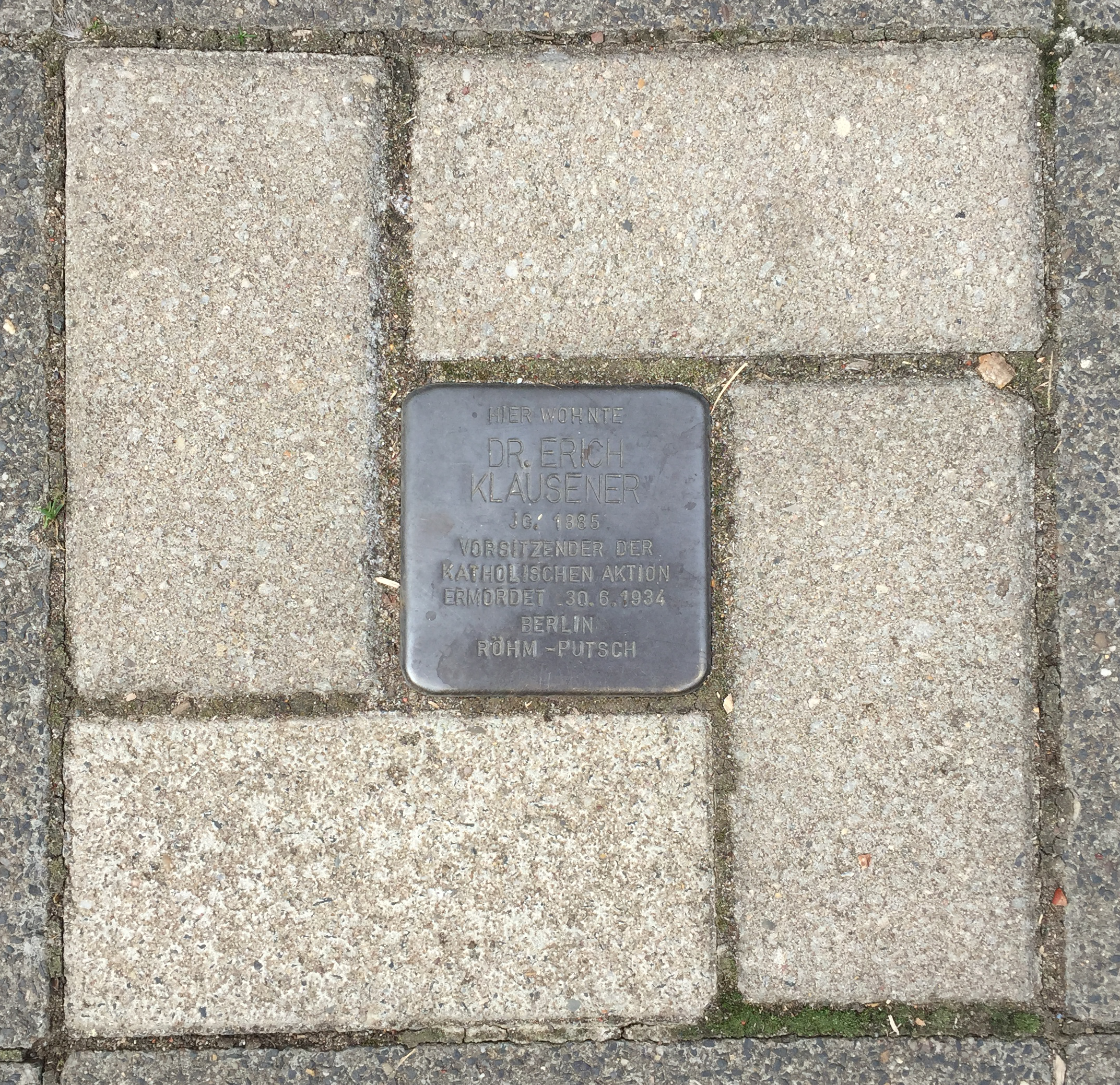
Klausener's Stolperstein in Düsseldorf, Leo-Statz-Platz on Kronprinzenstaße

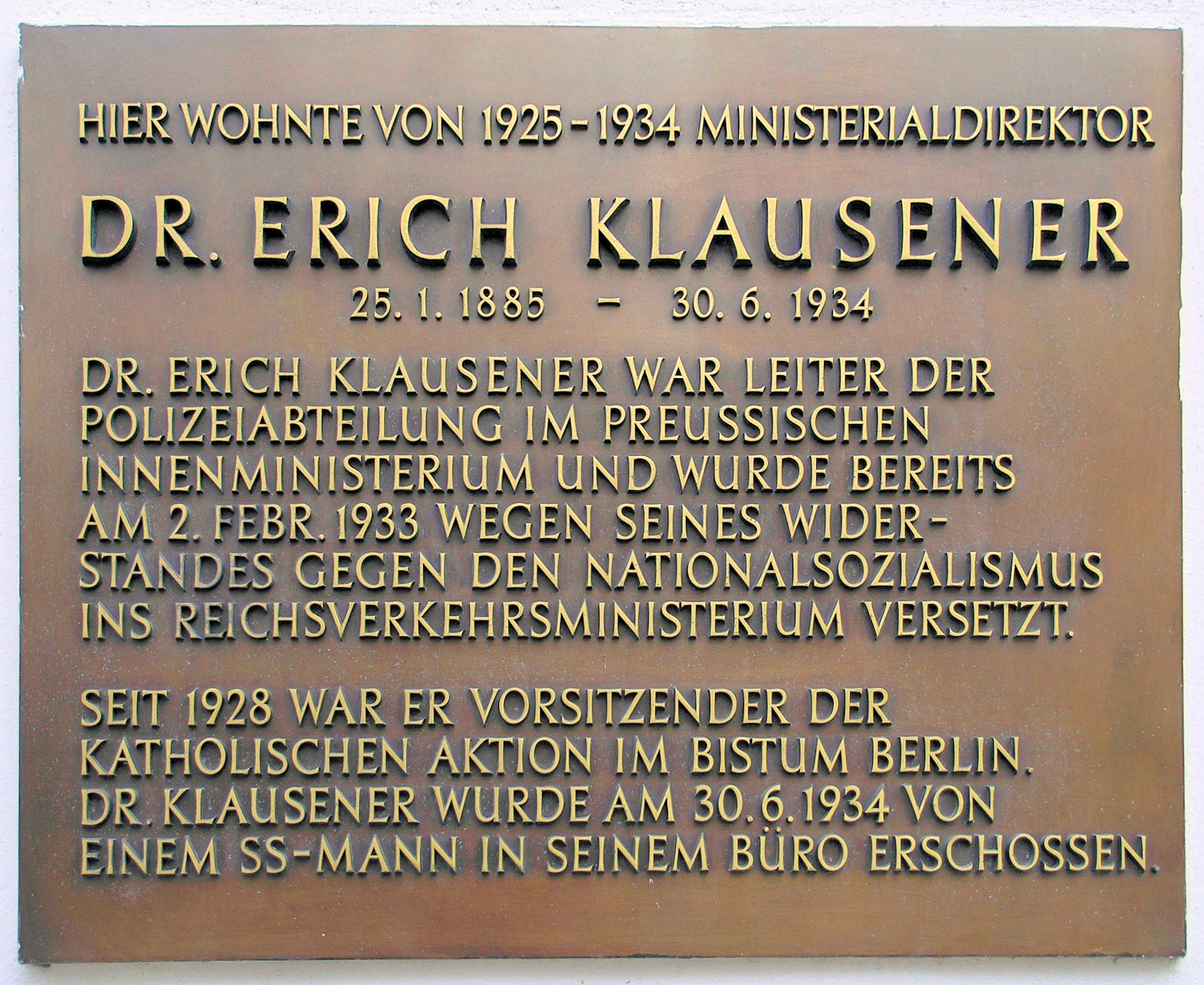
Klausener Memorial Plaque in Keithstrasse 8, Schöneberg, Berlin

== See also ==
- Herbert von Bose
- Edgar Julius Jung
- Franz von Papen

== Sources ==
- Shirer, William Lawrence (1960), The Rise and Fall of the Third Reich: A History of Nazi Germany, New York City: Simon & Schuster, ASIN B0766DKDLR, LCCN 60006729, OCLC 1286630, OL 5794925M, Wikidata Q138029595
