= Szembek =

Coat of arms of Szembek family

The Szembek family or originally von Schönbeck is the name of an old Polish noble family of German origin, whose members held significant positions in the Polish–Lithuanian Commonwealth.

== History ==
First mentioned at the beginning of the 14th century, the family name was originally von Schönbeck and came to Kraków from the Altmark, Germany. Accepted into the nobility of the Holy Roman Empire in the 16th century, members of the family held numerous high secular and ecclesiastical offices, particularly under the Saxon Kings of Poland. At the beginning of the 19th century, one branch elevated to the rank of Count in the Kingdom of Prussia.

== Notable members ==
- Jadwiga Szembekówna (1883–1939), Polish archeologist and ethnographer, writer and social activist
- Jan Szembek (1672–1731), grand chancellor of the Polish Crown
- Jan Szembek (1881–1945), Polish diplomat
- Krzysztof Antoni Szembek (1667–1748), archbishop of Gniezno and primate of Poland
- Stanisław Szembek (1650–1721), Catholic prelate

== See also ==
- pl:Kategoria:Szembekowie herbu własnego
