= Jan Szembek =

Polish szlachcic

Jan Sebastian Szembek
- Count
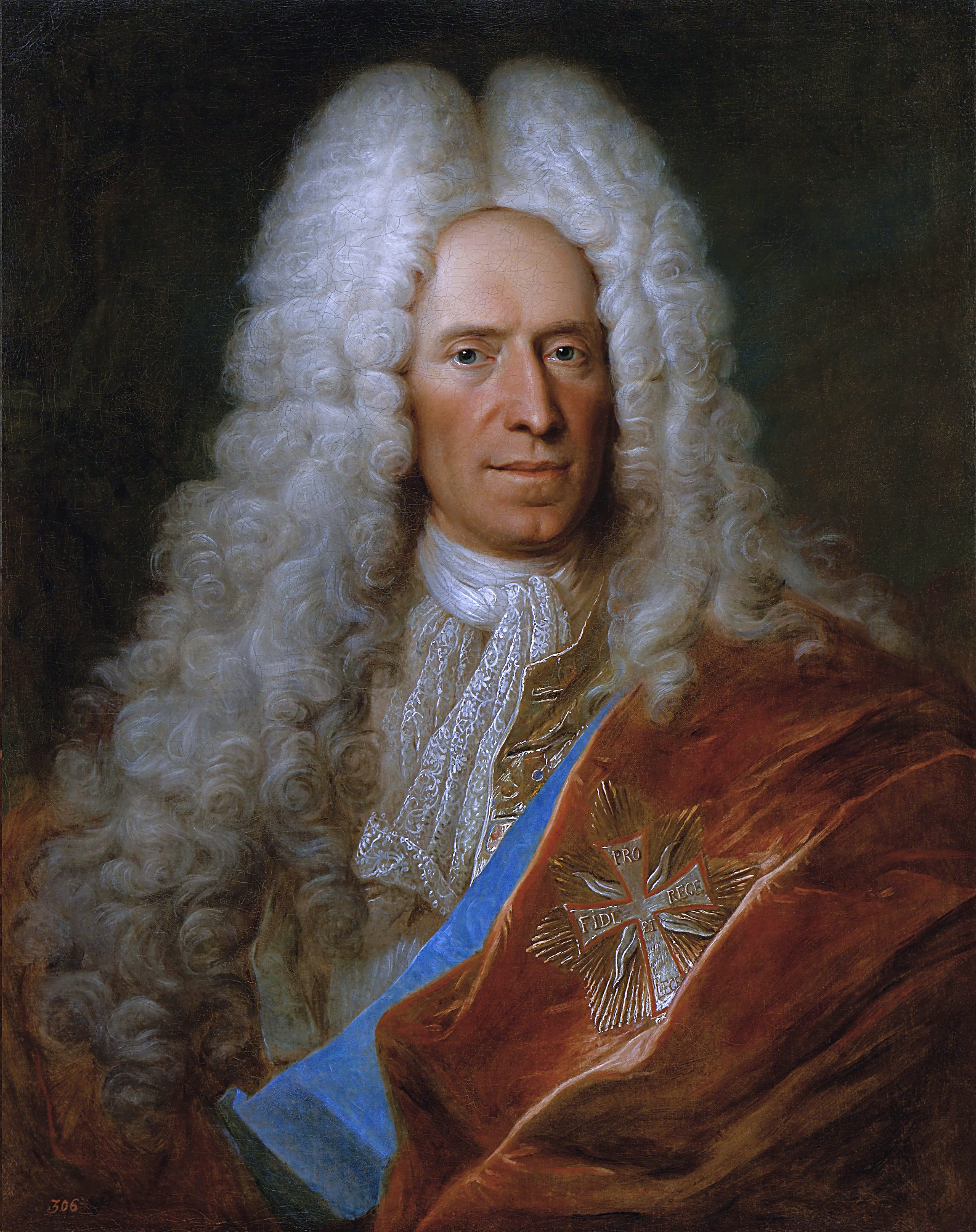
- Portrait attributed to Ádám Mányoki
- Coat of arms: Szembek
- Full name: Jan Sebastian Szembek
- Died: April 9, 1731
- Family: Szembek
- Consort: Ewa Leszczyńska
- Issue: Bihilda Szembek

Count Jan Sebastian Szembek (1672-1731) was a Polish szlachcic.

He was Recorder of the Crown starting in 1699, Vice-Chancellor of the Crown in 1702, and Grand Chancellor of the Crown since 1712. He was also the starost of Łomża in 1706.

Marshal of the Sejm (zwyczajnego) on December 22, 1701 - February 6, 1702.
