= Apolinary Wnukowski =

Former Archbishop of Mohilev

- Archbishop of Mohilev
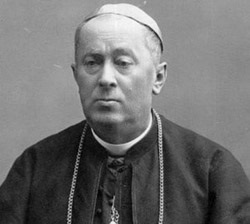
- Predecessor: Jerzy Józef Szembek
- Successor: Wincenty Kluczyński
- Previous post(s): Bishop of Płock (1904 – 1908)

Orders
- Ordination: 15 June 1872

Personal details
- Born: 1848
- Died: 1909

Apolinary Wnukowski (1848–1909) was a Catholic clergyman who was Archbishop of Mohilev (1908-1909).

Wnukowski was born in Podolia to Maciej and Anna. He attended the gymnasium in Kamianets-Podilskyi. His theological education continued in Zhytomyr and Saint Petersburg, and he became a priest on 15 June 1872. His theological education in Saint Petersburg ended in 1874, obtaining a magister degree primi ordinis. He was then professor of dogmatics in Zhytomyr and became seminary rector by 1898. He then became Bishop of Płock in 1904 and Archbishop of Mohilev in 1908.

Wnukowski died in 1909 and is buried in Zhytomyr. He was a recipient of the Order of Saint Vladimir.
