= Jan Szembek (diplomat) =

Polish diplomat

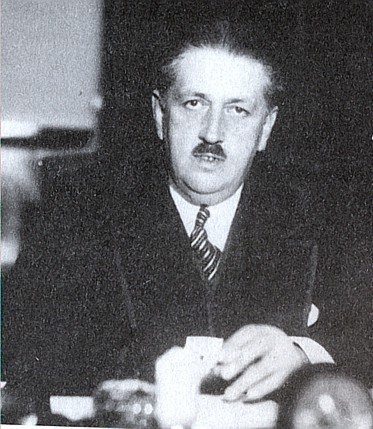

Poland Ambassador to Hungary
- In office January 1919 – 19 September 1924
- Succeeded by: Jerzy Tomaszewski

Poland Ambassador to Belgium
- In office 15 September 1924 – 16 February 1927
- Preceded by: Władysław Sobański
- Succeeded by: Anatol Mühlstein

Poland Ambassador to Romania
- In office 16 February 1927 – 4 November 1932
- Preceded by: Józef Wielowieyski
- Succeeded by: Mirosław Arciszewski

Personal details
- Born: 11 July 1881 Poręba Żegoty
- Died: 9 July 1945 (aged 63) Estoril
- Education: Vienna University
- Profession: Diplomat

Jan Szembek (11 July 1881 – 9 July 1945) was a Polish diplomat, one of the most influential ones in the final years of the Second Polish Republic and a close associate of Józef Beck.

== Early life ==
Szembek was born in a szlachta family on 11 July 1881 in the village of Poręba, near Alwernia. He graduated from the Vienna University and took up the post of an Austrian government clerk in Bosnia (1905-1908). In 1908, he settled in Kraków.

== Diplomatic career ==
In 1919, after Poland regained independence from the partitions of Poland, Szembek was named chargé d'affaires and later he was the Polish ambassador in Budapest (1921-1924), Brussels (1925) and Bucharest (1927), where he remained until 1932. After returning to Poland, he took up the job of deputy secretary in the Ministry of Foreign Affairs in Warsaw.

After the invasion of Poland, he left Poland on 17 September 1939, along with other members of the government. His home, in the village of Mloszowa, near Trzebinia, was ransacked by the Germans, who also burned Szembek's personal library. He died on 9 July 1945 in Estoril, near Lisbon.

== Bibliography ==
Szembek wrote two books:

- Diariusz i teki Jana Szembeka 1934 - 1939, t. 1 - 4, London 1964 - 1972
- Jan Szembek Diariusz. Wrzesien-Grudzien 1939, Wydawnictwo PAX Warszawa 1989, ISBN 83-211-1100-9

== Decorations and awards ==
- Commander's Cross with Star of the Order of Polonia Restituta
- Medal Decades of Independence Regained
- Grand Cross of the Order of the Southern Cross (Brazil)
- Order of the Oak Crown (Luxembourg)
- Grand Cross of the Military Order of Christ (Portugal)
- Order of the Crown (Romania)
- Order of the Star of Romania
- Order of Merit of the Republic of Hungary, 1st class
- Grand Cross of the Order of the Crown of Italy
- Order of the White Star, 1st class (Estonia)

== Sources ==
- Młoszowa at mloszowa.mbp.trzebinia.pl
- Ibidem - Zrodla do historii Polski XIX - XX w.(przypisy) at www.ibidem.com.pl
