= Poręba Żegoty =

- Village
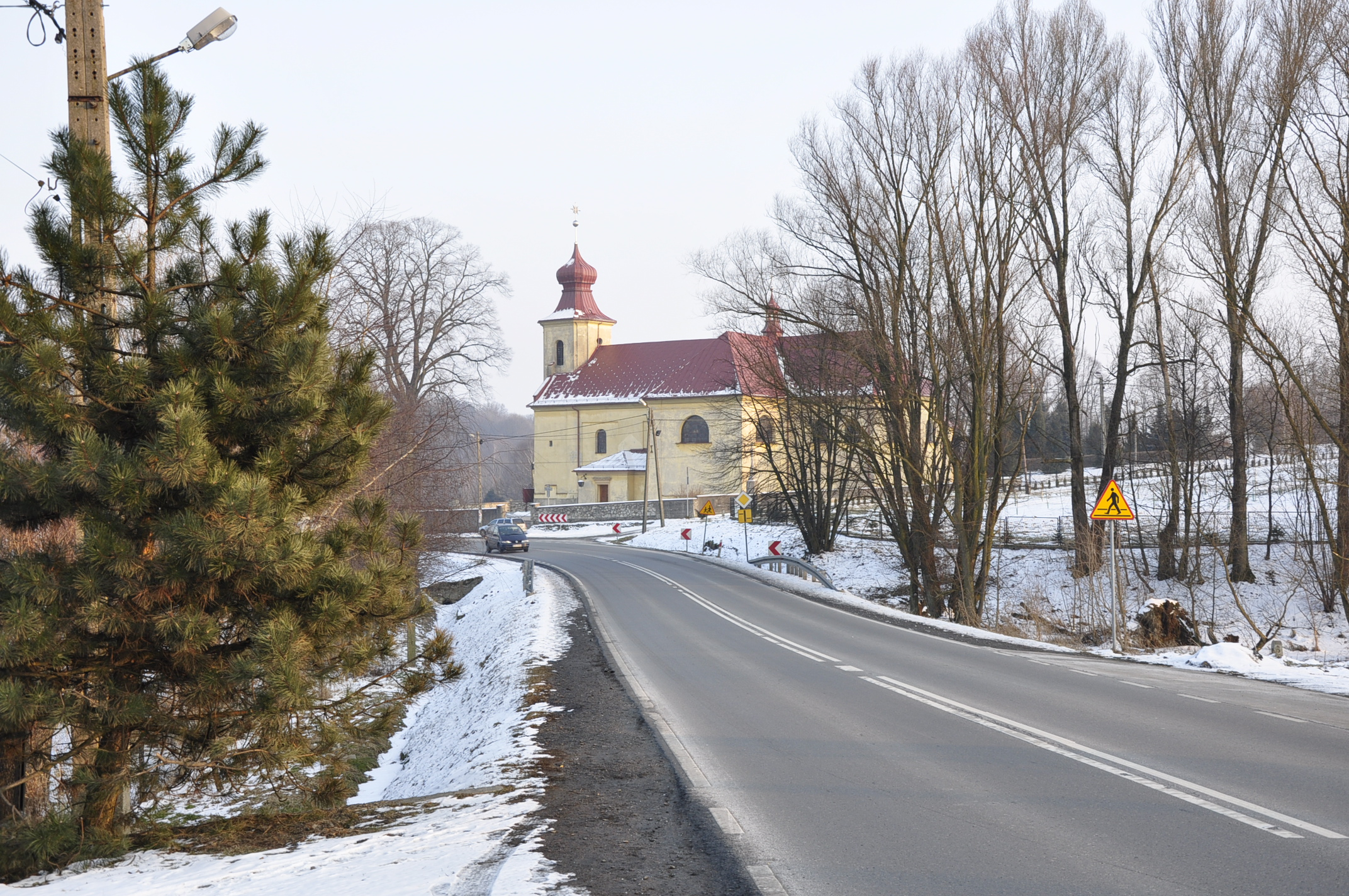

- Location within Poland
- Coordinates: 50°4′N 19°34′E
- Country: Poland
- Voivodeship: Lesser Poland
- County: Chrzanów
- Gmina: Alwernia
- Population: 1,115

Poręba Żegoty [pɔˈrɛmba ʐɛˈɡɔtɨ] is a village in the administrative district of Gmina Alwernia, within Chrzanów County, Lesser Poland Voivodeship, in southern Poland.
