= Victims of the Night of the Long Knives =

List of victims of the 1934 purge in Nazi Germany

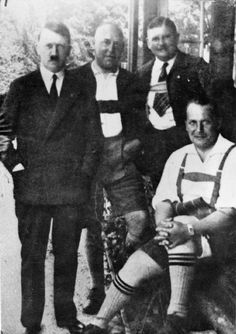
Adolf Hitler, Gregor Strasser, Ernst Röhm and Hermann Göring in 1932; Röhm and Strasser would be killed in the Night of the Long Knives, which in large part was provoked by evidence fabricated by Göring and Heinrich Himmler purporting to show that Röhm was planning a coup.

The Night of the Long Knives (German: Nacht der langen Messer) was a purge in which Adolf Hitler and the regime of Nazi Germany targeted members of the Sturmabteilung (SA), the paramilitary wing of the Nazi Party, as well as past opponents of the party. At least 85 people were murdered in the purge, which took place between June 30 and July 2, 1934.

Although most of those killed during the Night of the Long Knives were members of the SA, other victims included close associates of Vice Chancellor Franz von Papen, several Reichswehr ('German Army') members – one of whom, General Kurt von Schleicher, was formerly Chancellor of Germany – and their associates; Gregor Strasser, Hitler's former competitor for control of the Nazi Party; at least one person killed in a case of mistaken identity; and several victims killed because they "knew too much".

The total number of victims is heavily disputed between historians; some estimates put the number in the hundreds.

== Debate over number of victims ==
The precise number of victims is disputed and will probably never be known with certainty. During the purge itself official radio and newspaper reports only gave the names of ten people killed: the six SA-leaders executed in Stadelheim Prison on June 30; Kurt von Schleicher, a German general and a former Chancellor of the Weimar Republic, and his wife; Karl Ernst, who was wrongly reported to have been shot in Stadelheim, whereas in fact he was shot in the barracks of Hitler's Personal Guard Unit in Berlin Lichterfelde; and Ernst Röhm.

While the German newspapers avoided disclosing the names of further victims of the purge, in the weeks and months to follow, the international press would set out to detail a more comprehensive account of how many people had been killed between June 30 to July 2. They managed to present about 100 names of people allegedly killed, although a number of those eventually turned out to have survived, such as the former SA chief of Berlin Wolf-Heinrich Graf von Helldorf (who was actually one of the organizers of the purge – e.g. he warned Werner von Alvensleben, Schleicher's go-between to Hitler – but not Schleicher – to spend the fateful weekend at his hunting lodge; and was himself only killed after participating in the fateful 20th of July 1944 coup attempt) and Adolf Morsbach, the head of the cosmopolitan-minded Akademischer Austauschdienst ('Academic Exchange Programme'), who had instead been sent to a Nazi concentration camp.

=== Official list of those killed ===
Immediately after the events of the purge, the Gestapo compiled an official list of those killed at the order of Hitler, who wanted a precise overview of the killings to prepare his July 13 Reichstag speech explaining the purge to the German public and the world at large. This "Gestapo List" compiled 77 names.

In his Reichstag speech Hitler sub-divided those into 61 persons who had been shot during "the action"; allegedly 13 had died resisting arrest while three committed suicide. In his speech Hitler revealed the names of 11 of those 77 (Ferdinand von Bredow, Georg von Detten, Karl Ernst, Hans Hayn, Edmund Heines, Peter von Heydebreck, Ernst Röhm, Kurt von Schleicher, Hans Walter Schmidt, Gregor Strasser, and Julius Uhl).

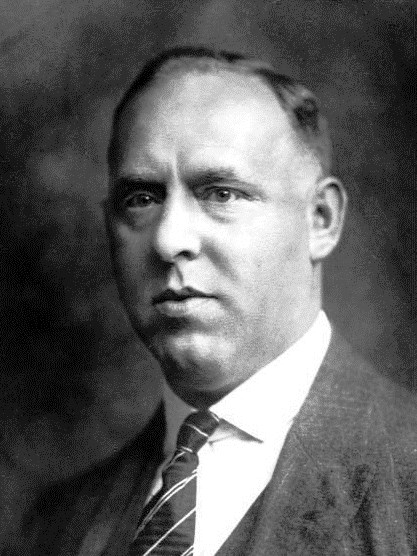
Gregor Strasser, Hitler's former competitor for control of the Nazi Party (photo 1928)

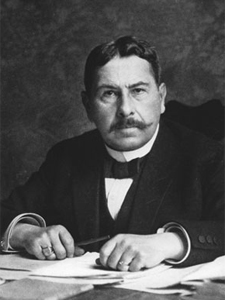
Gustav von Kahr (photo 1920)

However, the list of 77 was far from complete: Hitler admitted that some excesses had taken place, and stated that he had directed local Attorney Offices to investigate several unauthorized killings by subordinate leaders. Among those cases were the city clerk Kuno Kamphausen, who was murdered at the order of an SS officer with a personal grudge because his brother had been refused a construction permit, and the cases of four Jews and two Communists killed by lower SS echelons in Silesia without permission from Berlin. In September 1934, Heinrich Himmler – eager to shield his SS men – convinced Hitler to change his mind on the latter six victims, who were then added to the list of sanctioned executions, making 83 in total.

The list of 77 or 83 names was kept strictly confidential in several copies in the Ministry of Justice and the Gestapo Headquarters. On July 3 the Reich Cabinet passed the Gesetz über Maßnahmen der Staatsnotwehr ('Law pertaining to the Measures of Self-Defense of the State'), which declared: "Die zur Niederschlagung hoch- und landesverräterischer Angriffe am 30. Juni, 1. und 2. Juli 1934 vollzogenen Maßnahmen sind als Staatsnotwehr rechtens" ('The measures taken to suppress the treasonous attacks of June 30th, July 1st and 2nd are lawful as acts of state self-defense.') Under this law, the official lists decided whether to grant requests for permission to investigate and prosecute from police and Attorney Offices, and for information from relatives and friends of the victims.

The official list of those killed was first published in 1964 by Heinrich Bennecke (1902–1972) in the appendix of his book Die Reichswehr und der "Röhm-Putsch".

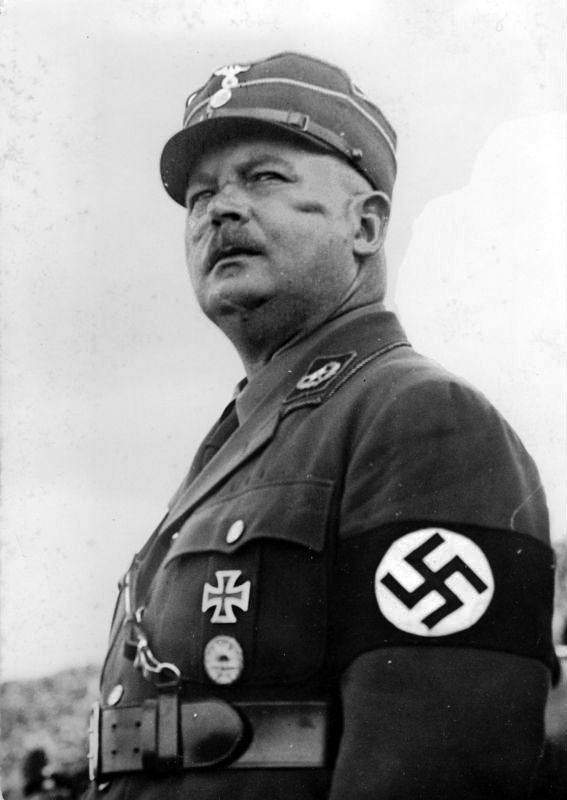
Ernst Röhm, Chief of Staff of the Sturmabteilung (SA), one of the primary targets of the purge (1933)

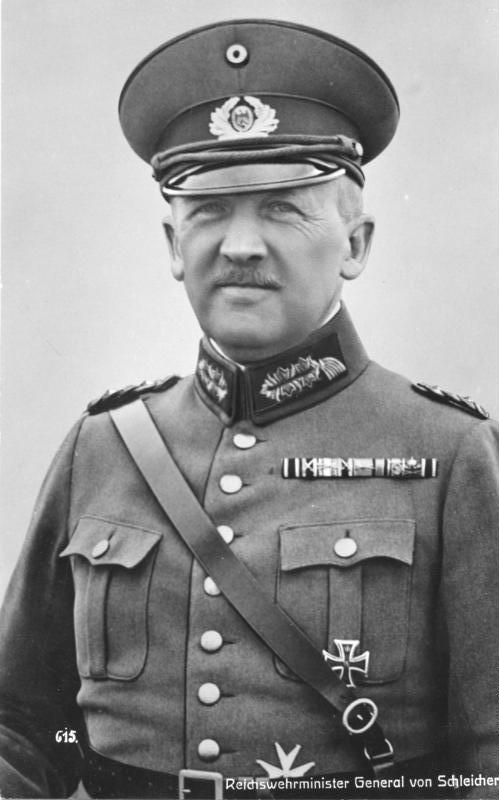
Kurt von Schleicher, former Chancellor of Germany (1932)

=== Estimates of victims beyond the official list ===
Later research by historians has shown that in addition to those listed by the Gestapo, a number of others were killed. Heinrich Bennecke added the names of the city clerk Kuno Kamphausen from Waldenburg and the music critic Willi Schmid to his reprint of the official Gestapo list, whereupon he concluded that at least 85 people were killed during the purge. Later, Hans Günther Richardi, in his study on the Dachau concentration camp, added the names of four inmates of Dachau (lawyer Julius Adler (1882–1934), worker Erich Gans (1908–1934), Walter Häbich and worker Adam Hereth (1897–1934)), claiming they were murdered by the SS during the purge. In 1993 Otto Gritschneder published a book on the post–World War II prosecution of those involved in the killings which lists 90 deaths (adding the doctor and Röhm associate Karl Günther Heimsoth).

Richard J. Evans states that at least 85 people were killed and more than 1000 arrested. Ian Kershaw also cites the number of deaths at 85. Kershaw notes that "some estimates...put the total number killed at between 150 and 200." William L. Shirer writes in his Rise and Fall of the Third Reich, that "The White Book of the Purge, published by émigrés in Paris claims 401 deaths, but lists only 116 of them. At the 1957 trial in Munich the figure 'more than 1,000' was used." The 401 and 1000 figures are much higher than is accepted by most historians, and Shirer did not vouch for the accuracy of the 401 figure. The most recent study lists 89 definite deaths, as well as two unclear victims who might have been murdered slightly before or after the purge.

== Partial list of victims ==
Name	Place of death	Personal details	Circumstances	Image
Otto Ballerstedt	Dachau Concentration Camp	Former Chief of the Bayernbund, a secessionist political group in Bavaria. Hitler was imprisoned for a month in 1922 after he had physically attacked Ballerstedt at a rally.	Ballerstedt was arrested on the evening of 30 June 1934 by armed SS men in his Munich apartment, a day before going on a planned trip to Austria. He was killed in or near Dachau concentration camp. His body found on the morning of 1 July in the forest near Gündinger Neuhimmelreich. The autopsy revealed he had died by a shot to the back of the head.	—
Fritz Beck	Gündinger Forest near Dachau	Director of the Munich Students' Welfare Fund	Killed either for his contacts to Röhm, who was honorary president of his student association, or for his opposition to Nazi policy.	
Herbert von Bose	Borsig Palace, Berlin	Press chief in the Prussian State Ministry, senior government councillor and associate of Franz von Papen. Part of the catholic conservative opposition centered around Edgar Jung.	Initially reported as "suicide" then revised to "shot while resisting search of the Chancellery".	
Ferdinand von Bredow	Berlin	Chief of the Abwehr, Generalmajor of the Reichswehr, close associate of Kurt von Schleicher, famed militarist and Junker.	Shot when answering his door at Spichernstrasse 15 in Berlin's Wilmersdorf, or perhaps executed the following Monday by firing squad.	
Georg von Detten	Lichterfelde SS barracks	Member of the Reichstag, SA-Gruppenführer and head of the Political Office in the Supreme SA-Leadership	Arrested at Munich train station and transferred to Stadelheim Prison. Together with his staff leader Hans-Joachim von Falkenhausen, Karl Schreyer and Fritz Ritter von Kraußer, he was flown to Berlin. The four men were held at Columbia concentration camp prior to execution at Lichterfelde SS barracks.	
Karl Ernst	Lichterfelde, SS barracks	Member of the Reichstag, SA-Gruppenführer and Führer of SA-Gruppe Berlin-Brandenburg	Ernst was arrested in Bremerhaven together with his wife about to board a ship to travel to their honeymoon. He was handed over in Bonn to an SS unit led by Kurt Gildisch for interrogation. He was flown to Berlin, taken to the Leibstandarte Adolf Hitler barracks. He was shot by firing squad on June 30, one of 14 people shot there.	
Hans Joachim von Falkenhausen	Lichterfelde SS barracks	SA-Oberführer, chief of staff of Georg von Detten, brother of General and miliary governor Alexander von Falkenhausen.	He was arrested in Munich on June 30, 1934. The next day he was flown to Berlin with Georg von Detten, Fritz von Krausser and Karl Schreyer. They were temporarily held in the Columbia concentration camp at Tempelhof. Falkenhausen was taken to Lichterfelde SS barracks and shot at 2 a.m. on July 2.	
Fritz Gerlich	Dachau Concentration Camp	Newspaper journalist, editor of Munich's Catholic weekly (Der Gerade Weg) and publisher of Catholic Action	Had been arrested already on 9 March 1933 and was in detention in Dachau KZ prior to his execution.	
Alexander Glaser	Maxvorstadt, Munich	Lawyer, associate of Gregor Strasser	Shot from behind outside his apartment on Amalienstrasse in Munich. He succumbed to his injuries a few days later, on July 5 at Schwabing Hospital.	
Hans Hayn	Stadelheim Prison, Munich	Member of the Reichstag, SA-Gruppenführer and Führer of SA-Gruppe Sachsen	On June 30, 1934, Hayn was arrested and taken to Stadelheim Prison in Munich. There he was shot by the SS Leibstandarte under Sepp Dietrich in the afternoon, along with Edmund Heines, Peter von Heydebreck, Wilhelm Schmid, August Schneidhuber and Hans Erwin von Spreti-Weilbach.	—
Edmund Heines	Stadelheim Prison, Munich	Member of the Reichstag, SA-Obergruppenführer, deputy to Röhm, Führer of SA-Obergruppe VIII (Silesia) and Chief of Police of Breslau	Arrested at Bad Wiessee having been found in bed with Erich Schiewek, transferred to Stadelheim Prison where he was shot by an SS firing squad convened by Sepp Dietrich. In 1957, Dietrich was convicted of being an accessory to manslaughter by a West German court and sentenced to 18 months in prison.	
Oskar Heines	In a field near Groß Heidau	SA-Sturmbannführer and younger brother of Edmund Heines.		—
Hans Peter von Heydebreck	Stadelheim Prison, Munich	Member of the Reichstag, SA-Brigadeführer and Führer of SA-Gruppe Pomerania	Arrested on his way to Bad Weissee and transferred to Stadelheim Prison. He was shot by an SS-Leibstandarte firing squad convened along with Hans Hayn, Edmund Heines, Wilhelm Schmid, August Schneidhuber and Hans Erwin von Spreti-Weilbach in the early evening of the same day. In 1957, Sepp Dietrich, who convened the firing squad which executed the men, was convicted of being an accessory to manslaughter by a West German court and sentenced to 18 months in prison.	—
Anton von Hohberg und Buchwald	Dulzen, East Prussia	SS-Obersturmführer, one of only five SS victims.	Shot by two SS men at his home on the orders of Obergruppenführer Erich von dem Bach-Zelewski. On January 16, 1961, von dem Bach Zelewski was convicted of manslaughter by a West German court and sentenced to 4 1/2 years imprisonment	—
Edgar Julius Jung	Uncertain, possibly Berlin	Lawyer, Catholic Action worker. Authored Vice-Chancellor Franz von Papen's "Marburg speech", critical of the Nazi Party.	In 'protective custody' since late June. Found dead in a ditch near Oranienburg on 1 July, or executed the following Monday by firing squad.	
Gustav Ritter von Kahr	Dachau concentration camp	Former prime minister of Bavaria, member of Triumvirate that ruled Bavaria during the Beer Hall Putsch.	Shot at the Dachau concentration camp. Story that his body was later found hacked with pickaxes largely discredited by later historians.	
Dr. Kuno Kamphausen	Waldenburg	Architect, member of the Zentrum political party	Three SS officers were convicted of his manslaughter in 1934 and sentenced to 1, 2, and 5 years in prison. However, they were all released from prison within a year, under pressure by Himmler.	
Eugen von Kessel	Tiergartenstrasse, Berlin	Former officer and police captain	Shot dead in his Berlin office on June 30, 1934.	—
Erich Klausener	Wilhelmstrasse 80, Berlin	Catholic Professor, former leader of the police department in the Prussian ministry of internal affairs and president of Berlin's Catholic Action group. Close associate of Vice-Chancellor Franz von Papen and contributed to the Marburg speech.	Shot in his office at the Ministry of Transport in Berlin. The assassination was ordered by Reinhard Heydrich, and carried out by Kurt Gildisch. After the war, Gildisch convicted of his murder, having been promoted by the SS in rank after the killing, and sentenced to 15 years in prison. He was released from prison on health grounds shortly before his death in 1956.	
Hans-Karl Koch	Lichterfelde SS barracks	Member of the Reichstag, SA-Brigadeführer and commander of SA-Gruppe Westmark	Arrested in Bad Wiessee but released. Arrested again in Koblenz, transferred to Berlin where he was executed at Lichterfelde SS barracks on 1 July.	—
Fritz Ritter von Kraußer	Lichterfelde SS barracks	Member of the Reichstag, SA-Obergruppenführer and Chief of Department I (Organization) in the Supreme SA Leadership.	Arrested on 30 June 1934, and sent to Stadelheim prison. Transferred from Munich to Berlin where he was executed at Lichterfelde SS barracks on 2 July.	
Adalbert Probst	Unknown	National director of the Catholic Youth Sports Association (Deutsche Jugendkraft-Sportverbands)	Probst was abducted and later found dead, allegedly "shot while trying to escape".	
Hans Ramshorn	Woods near Obernigk and Breslau-Deutsch-Lissa	Member of the Reichstag, SA-Brigadeführer in Oberschlesien and chief of police of Gleiwitz	Udo von Woyrsch was convicted of manslaughter for this killing amongst others in 1957 and sentenced to 10 years imprisonment.	—
Ernst Röhm	Stadelheim prison, Munich	SA-Stabschef (chief of staff), Minister without portfolio in the Reich cabinet and Member of the Reichstag	Arrested at Bad Wiessee, transferred to Stadelheim Prison. Executed in his cell after being given a gun with one bullet and asked to commit suicide.	
Paul Röhrbein	Dachau concentration camp	SA-captain, leader of the first SA of Berlin	In protective custody in various prisons in Munich and in the Dachau concentration camp since July 5, 1933. Shot along with Fritz Gerlich.	—
Martin Schätzl	Dachau Concentration Camp	SA-Obertruppführer and adjutant to Röhm	Arrested at Bad Wiessee, transferred to Stadelheim Prison, taken to Dachau KZ where he was shot by the SS.	
Erich Schiewek	Dachau concentration camp	SA-Obertruppführer from Breslau, accompanied Edmund Heines to Bad Wiessee as substitute adjutant	Arrested in bed with Heines. After incarceration in Stadelheim Prison, he was transferred to Dachau KZ where he was shot by the SS alongside Max Vogel.	—
General Kurt von Schleicher	Babelsberg, Potsdam	Former Chancellor of Germany.	Shot at home with his wife, reported as "resisting arrest".	
Elisabeth von Schleicher	Babelsberg	Wife of Kurt von Schleicher.	Shot alongside her husband, died on the way to hospital	
Wilhelm Eduard Schmid	Dachau Concentration Camp	Music critic for the Münchener Neueste Nachrichten, a Munich newspaper.	Killed by SS in a case of mistaken identity, believing him to be either SA-Gruppenführer Wilhelm Schmid or Dr. Ludwig Schmitt, sympathizer of Otto Strasser.	
Wilhelm Schmid	Stadelheim Prison, Munich	SA-Gruppenführer, Führer of SA-Gruppe Hochland in Munich and member of the Reichstag	Arrested in Munich and sent to Stadelheim prison. He was executed by the Leibstandarte along with SA leaders Hans Hayn, Edmund Heines, Peter von Heydebreck, August Schneidhuber and Hans Erwin von Spreti-Weilbach. In 1957, Sepp Dietrich, who convened the firing squad which executed the men, was convicted of being an accessory to manslaughter by a West German court and sentenced to 18 months in prison.	
August Schneidhuber	Stadelheim Prison, Munich	SA-Obergruppenführer, Führer of SA-Obergruppe VII (Munich), chief of police in Munich and member of the Reichstag	Arrested by Hitler in Munich and sent to Stadelheim prison. He was executed by the Leibstandarte along with SA leaders Hans Hayn, Peter von Heydebreck, Wilhelm Schmid, Hans Erwin von Spreti-Weilbach and Edmund Heines. In 1957, Sepp Dietrich, who convened the firing squad which executed the men, was convicted of being an accessory to manslaughter by a West German court and sentenced to 18 months in prison.	
Konrad Schragmüller	Lichterfelde SS barracks	SA-Gruppenführer, Member of the Reichstag, chief of police of Magdeburg	Arrested in Bad Wiessee. Transferred to Lichterfelde SS barracks where he was shot.	—
Hans Schweighart	Dachau Concentration Camp	SA-Standartenführer – Adjutant to Ernst Röhm	Arrested on June 30, 1934, in Bad Wiessee and taken to Stadelheim Prison. Shot in Dachau KZ on July 1, 1934.	
Emil Sembach	Riesengebirge	Member of the Reichstag, ex-SS-Oberführer	Udo von Woyrsch was convicted of manslaughter for this killing amongst others in 1957 and sentenced to 10 years imprisonment.	
Hans Erwin Graf von Spreti-Weilbach	Stadelheim Prison, Munich	Close associate of Röhm, SA-Standartenführer	Arrested at Bad Wiessee, transferred to Stadelheim Prison where he was executed by the Leibstandarte on 30 June along with Hans Hayn, Edmund Heines, Peter von Heydebreck, Wilhelm Schmid and August Schneidhuber. In 1957, Sepp Dietrich, who convened the firing squad which executed the men, was convicted of being an accessory to manslaughter by a West German court and sentenced to 18 months in prison.	
Father Bernhard Stempfle	Munich	Defrocked priest, former co-prisoner of Hitler in Landsberg, Bavaria, and one of the editors of Mein Kampf	No known motive.	
Gregor Strasser	Prinz-Albrecht-Strasse, Berlin	Former high-ranking Nazi Party member as Reichsorganisationsleiter and former member of the Reichstag. Hitler was godfather to his children.	Shot in a cell in the Gestapo HQ. Reported as a suicide.	
Julius Uhl	Dachau concentration camp	SA-Standartenführer, Hitler named him in the Reichstag as the man who would've killed him	Arrested at Bad Weissee on June 30 then transferred to Stadelheim Prison. Along with Martin Schätzl and Johann König he was transferred to Dachau Concentration Camp and shot on July 2.	
Maximilian "Max" Vogel	Dachau concentration camp	SA-Obersturmführer, Ernst Röhm's chauffeur	Arrested in Bad Wiessee. After incarceration in Stadelheim Prison, he was transferred to Dachau KZ where he was shot by the SS together with Erich Schiewek.	—
Gerd Voß	Lichterfelde SS barracks	SA-Sturmführer, lawyer and SA legal adviser to Karl Ernst		—
Karl Zehnter	Road from Dachau to Augsburg near Längenmoos	Zum Bratwurstglöckl proprietor	The Zum Bratwurstglöckl in Munich was Röhm's favorite tavern, where Goebbels met secretly with Röhm prior to the purge. Although not involved politically, it was deemed that he 'knew too much'.	—
Alexander Zweig	Near Hirschberg	Jewish doctor from Hirschberg		—
Jeanette Zweig	Near Hirschberg	Wife of Alexander Zweig (contrary to some accounts, she herself was not Jewish by birth)		—
Ernestine Zoref	Dachau concentration camp	Partner of arrested journalist Paul Edmund von Hahn, a suspected Soviet spy.	After imprisonment at Dachau KZ, Zoref was released only to be rearrested on June 30, 1934. She was brought back to Dachau and immediately shot.	—

== Sources ==
- Gritschneder, Otto [in German] (1993a). Der Führer hat Sie zum Tode verurteilt … [The Führer Has Sentenced You to Death ...] (in German). Munich: C.H. Beck. ISBN 9783406376511.
- Gritschneder, Otto [in German] (1993b). Der Führer hat sie zum Tode verurteilt. Munich. ISBN 3-406-37651-7.
- Gritschneder, Otto [in German] (1993c). The Führer sentenced you to death. Hitler's "Röhm Putsch" murders in court. Munich. ISBN 3406376517.
- Shirer, William Lawrence (1960), The Rise and Fall of the Third Reich: A History of Nazi Germany, New York City: Simon & Schuster, ASIN B0766DKDLR, LCCN 60006729, OCLC 1286630, OL 5794925M, Wikidata Q138029595
