= Hans Koch =

Hans Koch may refer to:

- Hans Koch (clockmaker) (fl. 1554–1599), German clockmaker in Munich
- Hans Koch (footballer) (fl. 1896–1897), Swiss footballer
- Hans Koch (lawyer) (1893–1945), German lawyer, member of the German resistance against Nazism
- Hans-Karl Koch (1897–1934), Nazi Party politician and SA general; see Victims of the Night of the Long Knives
- Hans Koch (SS officer) (1912–1955), SS-Unterscharführer at Auschwitz
- Hans Koch (musician) (born 1948), Swiss clarinetist, saxophonist, and film score composer
- Hans Jørgen Koch, Danish civil servant and energy specialist
