= Karl Alexander Herklots =

Karl Alexander Herklots (19 January 1759 - 23 March 1830) was a German lawyer, chiefly remembered since his death as a theatre librettist and translator.

== Life ==
Karl Alexander Herklots was born in Dulzen, a small village a short distance to the southwest of Preußisch Eylau, at that time in East Prussia. He studied Jurisprudence at Königsberg, some 30 km (18 miles) to the north, and then in 1779 took a job as a referendary at the Prussian high court in the city. In 1790 he moved to Berlin, taking a post at the so-called "Kammergericht" (Berlin supreme court). Very quickly he formed links with the city's Hoftheater (Court theatre), producing a large number of introductory prologues and poems. He also delivered almost 70 translations from French and Italian, including those of La vestale by Spontini, of Alceste by Gluck and of Giulietta e Romeo by Zingarelli.

== Works (not a complete list) ==
- Der Mädchenmarkt. Komisches Singspiel in 3 Aufzügen. Berlin 1793. (Libretto)
- Das Inkognito. Berlin 1793 (Libretto)
- Der Prozeß. Oder Verlegenheit aus Irrthum. (The Trial) Berlin 1794 (Play)
- Die böse Frau. Komisches Original-Singspiel in 2 Aufzügen. Berlin 1791. (Libretto)
- Pigmalion oder die Reformation der Liebe. Ein lyrisches Drama in 2 Handlungen. (Pigmalion - a lyrical drama in two acts) Berlin 1794
