= Von Detten =

von Detten is a German surname. Notable people with the surname include:

- Erik von Detten (born 1982), American actor and singer
- Georg von Detten (1887–1934), German military officer
