= Hans-Karl Koch =

German Nazi & SA general (1897–1934)

Führer, SA-Gruppe Westmark
- In office 15 March 1934 – 30 June 1934
- SA-Stabschef: Ernst Röhm

Führer, SA-Brigade 21
- In office 15 September 1933 – 14 March 1934
- Gruppenführer: Edmund Heines

SA Special Commissioner for the Province of Lower Silesia
- In office March 1933 – 14 March 1934
- SA-Stabschef: Ernst Röhm

Führer, SA-Untergruppe Niederschlesien
- In office 1 July 1932 – 14 September 1933
- Gruppenführer: Edmund Heines

Additional positions
- 1933–1934: Reichstag Deputy
- 1932–1933: Landtag of Prussia Deputy

Personal details
- Born: Johannes Karl Ernst Fritz Koch; 14 October 1897 Potsdam, Kingdom of Prussia, German Empire
- Died: 1 July 1934 (aged 36) Preußische Hauptkadettenanstalt, Lichterfelde, Nazi Germany
- Cause of death: Execution by firing squad
- Party: Nazi Party
- Occupation: Farmer

Military service
- Allegiance: German Empire; Weimar Republic
- Branch/service: Royal Prussian Army; Freikorps; Reichswehr
- Years of service: 1914–1920
- Rank: Leutnant
- Unit: 15th Reserve Jäger Battalion; Freikorps Epp
- Battles/wars: World War I
- Awards: Iron Cross, 1st & 2nd class Wound Badge

Johannes Karl (Hans-Karl) Koch (14 October 1897 – 1 July 1934) was a German Nazi Party politician and an SA-Brigadeführer in the Party's paramilitary unit, the Sturmabteilung (SA). He was the SA commander in Lower Silesia and in western Germany, as well as a sitting member of the Reichstag. He was among those murdered in the Night of the Long Knives when Adolf Hitler launched a purge of the SA leadership.

== Early life ==
Koch was born in Potsdam, the son of a senior postal secretary in the Reichspost. He attended the local Volksschule and Gymnasium. After the outbreak of the First World War, Koch volunteered for military service and joined the Royal Prussian Army on 1 September 1914. He was sent to the western front with the 15th Reserve Jäger Battalion. By 1917, he had reached the rank of Leutnant of reserves. During the war, Koch was severely wounded by shrapnel resulting in a long hospitalization. He was awarded the Iron Cross, 1st and 2nd class.

Koch remained in the peacetime Reichswehr and, in March 1920, participated in the Kapp Putsch against the Weimar Republic. On 1 April 1920, he left military service and temporarily joined the Freikorps Epp, where he met Ernst Röhm. In the early 1920s, Koch studied at the Agricultural University of Berlin (now part of the Humboldt University of Berlin). He completed his studies in 1924 with a degree in agriculture and passed the state certification examination. He then became a farmer in Silesia.

== Nazi paramilitary and political career ==
On 1 July 1929, Koch joined the Nazi Party (membership number 141,923). He also joined its paramilitary organization, the Sturmabteilung (SA). From 1931, Koch assumed leadership roles on the staff of SA-Gruppenführer Edmund Heines, the commander of the SA in Silesia. Koch was advanced to SA-Standartenführer on 18 November 1931.

On 1 July 1932, Koch was promoted to SA-Oberführer and appointed the commander of SA-Untergruppe Niederschlesien (Subgroup Lower Saxony), with headquarters in Liegnitz (today, Legnica). Following the Nazi seizure of power, he was named Special Commissioner of the Supreme SA Leadership for the province of Lower Silesia in March 1933. He was promoted to SA-Brigadeführer with effect from 1 July 1933. On 15 September 1933, Koch was appointed commander of SA-Brigade 21, established as the successor to SA-Untergruppe Niederschlesien. On 15 March 1934, the Supreme SA Leadership transferred Koch to the command of SA-Gruppe Westmark. In this post, Koch commanded approximately 200,000 SA members in western Germany, from his headquarters in Koblenz. He retained this position until his arrest and execution.

In addition to his duties in the SA, Koch also pursued a political career. At the Prussian state election of 24 April 1932, he was elected as a deputy to the Landtag of Prussia and served there until it was dissolved by the Nazis in October 1933. At the parliamentary election of November 1933, Koch was elected to the Reichstag as a deputy from electoral constituency 8 (Liegnitz) and held this seat until his death.

== Arrest and death ==
On 20 June 1934, Koch traveled to the Bavarian spa town of Bad Wiessee for a conference of SA leaders scheduled for the next day and he stayed overnight at the Hotel Hanslbauer, the designated venue. In the early morning hours of 30 June, Adolf Hitler unexpectedly appeared with a large police escort and arrested most of the SA members present, including the SA-Stabschef Ernst Röhm and Koch's former commander, Edmund Heines.

After being arrested by the police, Koch was released by Hitler while still at the Hanselbauer, at the intercession of Viktor Lutze, whom Hitler had appointed as Röhm's successor as SA-Stabschaf. Unlike Röhm and most of the other SA leaders arrested in the hotel, Koch was not transported as a prisoner to Stadelheim Prison. Instead, he traveled to Munich with Hitler's entouragewhere he attended a midday conference in the Brown House, the Nazi Party headquarters. There, Hitler announced to the assembled senior Party and SA leaders that Röhm had been removed from his position as SA chief and had been arrested with several other SA leaders.

Although Koch had been released from arrest by Hitler, upon his return to Koblenz he was again arrested– since his pardon had apparently not been communicated to the police authorities outside Munich– and taken to the Bonn airfield where he was flown to Berlin. After arriving at Tempelhofer Feld, he was transferred to the Schutzstaffel (SS) barracks in Lichterfelde, where he was sentenced to death by a summary court martial and shot by a firing squad composed of members of the SS-Leibstandarte Adolf Hitler.

Koch's name appeared on the Gestapo's list of 77 individuals (later expanded to 83) whose executions were declared legal and exempt from criminal prosecution by the Reich government under the Gesetz über Maßnahmen der Staatsnotwehr (Law on Measures of State Self-Defense) enacted on 3 July 1934. In October 1934, Koch was posthumously expelled from the SA.

== SA ranks ==
SA ranks
| Date | Rank |
|---|---|
| 18 November 1931 | SA-Standartenführer |
| 1 July 1932 | SA-Oberführer |
| 1 July 1933 | SA-Brigadeführer |

== See also ==
- Victims of the Night of the Long Knives

== Sources ==
- Evans, Richard J. (2005). The Third Reich in Power. New York: Penguin Press. ISBN 978-0-143-03790-3.
- Information about Hans-Karl Koch in the Reichstag database
- Koch, Hans Karl in the Die Rheinland-Pfälzische Personendatenbank
- Stockhorst, Erich (1985). 5000 Köpfe: Wer War Was im 3. Reich. Arndt. p. 240. ISBN 978-3-887-41116-9
