= Oswald Rothaug =

Nazi jurist (1897–1967)

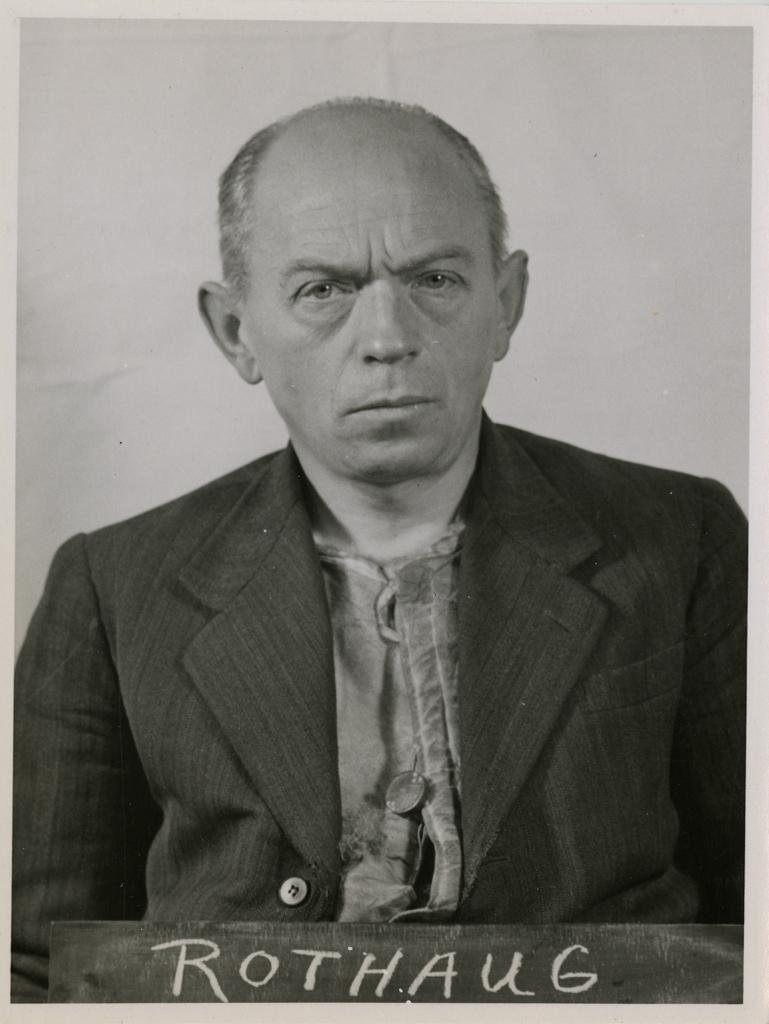
Oswald Rothaug, Nazi judge, on trial at Nuremberg

Oswald Rothaug (17 May 1897 – 4 December 1967) was a German Nazi jurist.

== Life ==
Rothaug was born in Mittelsinn, Bavaria 17 May, 1897. In June 1933, Rothaug was named a prosecutor in Nuremberg, and in April 1937, he became the regional court director in Schweinfurt and director of Nazi "special courts" or "Sondergerichte" at Nuremberg. In 1938, he became a member of the German Nazi Party, though he had applied the previous year. He worked closely with the Sicherheitsdienst or intelligence apparatus of the Nazi SS.

In 1942, he sentenced a 25-year-old Polish slave labourer to death, explaining that "the inferiority of the defendant is clear as he is a part of Polish sub-humanity".

Rothaug sought after and presided over the trial of Leo Katzenberger in March 1942, ordering his execution for "racial defilement" in May 1943. Rothaug accused the elderly Jewish man of having sexual relations with a younger German woman, Irene Seiler, which was a crime in Nazi Germany according to the Rassenschande or "racial purity" laws, a part of the Nuremberg Laws. Both Katzenberger and Seiler denied the accusations. Following the trial, Rothaug was brought to Berlin as a member of the Nazi People's Court.

During the Judges' Trial at Nuremberg, Rothaug was sentenced to life imprisonment on 14 December 1947 for crimes against humanity. He was the only defendant to be convicted of crimes against humanity, but acquitted of war crimes. Nonetheless, the court commented in its judgment that:

By his manner and methods he made his court an instrumentality of terror and won the fear and hatred of the population. From the evidence of his closest associates as well as his victims, we find that Oswald Rothaug represented in Germany the personification of the secret Nazi intrigue and cruelty. He was and is a sadistic and evil man. Under any civilized judicial system he could have been impeached and removed from office or convicted of malfeasance in office on account of the scheming malevolence with which he administered injustice.

His sentence was later reduced to 20 years, and he was released on parole on 22 December 1956.

== Death ==
Rothaug died in Cologne on 4 December 1967, aged 70.

== Cultural references ==
Rothaug's role in the Katzenberger trial was inspiration for the plot surrounding the fictional characters Ernst Janning and Irene Hoffman Wallner in the 1961 film Judgment at Nuremberg.
