= Georg von Detten =

Nazi Party politician and SA-Gruppenführer

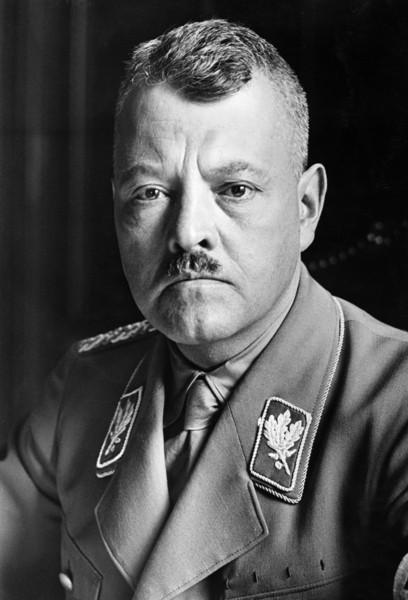
- Detten (c. 1932)

Head of the SA Political Office and Special Commissioner for Prussia of the Supreme SA Leadership
- In office 16 August 1933 – 2 July 1934

Additional positions
- 1933: Oberpräsident of the Saxony police
- 1933–1934: Member of the Prussian State Council
- 1932–1934: Member of the Reichstag

Personal details
- Born: 9 September 1887 Hagen, Province of Westphalia, Kingdom of Prussia, German Empire
- Died: 2 July 1934 (aged 46) Preußische Hauptkadettenanstalt, Berlin, Nazi Germany
- Cause of death: Execution by firing squad
- Education: Royal Prussian War School
- Profession: Military officer

Military service
- Allegiance: German Empire
- Branch/service: Prussian Army
- Years of service: 1913–1919
- Rank: Rittmeister
- Unit: 13th (1st Westphalian) Infantry Regiment; 8th (1st Westphalian) Hussar Regiment
- Battles/wars: World War I

Georg Ferdinand Philipp Maria von Detten (9 September 1887 – 2 July 1934) was a German army officer, Nazi Party politician and SA-Gruppenführer. He was extrajudicially murdered in Adolf Hitler's purge of the SA, known as the Night of the Long Knives.

== Early years and war service ==
Georg von Detten was born in Hagen, the fourth and youngest child of a district judge. After Volksschule, he attended Gymnasium in Paderborn, Brilon and Soest, and earned his Abitur in Duderstadt. He then attended the Kriegsschule (Royal Prussian War School) at Potsdam and was commissioned as a Leutnant in the Prussian Army in March 1913, serving in the 13th (1st Westphalian) Infantry Regiment "Herwarth von Bittenfeld" in Münster. In March 1914, Detten was transferred to the 8th (1st Westphalian) Hussar Regiment "Emperor Nicholas II of Russia", stationed in Paderborn. With this regiment, he participated in the First World War, fighting on the western front until the end of the war in 1918. He also trained as a fighter pilot and was discharged with the rank of Rittmeister at war's end. Returning to civilian life in 1919, Detten worked as a farmer, bank clerk and manager of a transport company until 1928.

== Nazi Party and SA career ==
Detten originally joined the Nazi Party in 1924. Following the lifting of the ban that had been imposed on the Party in the wake of the Beer Hall Putsch, he rejoined it when it was re-founded on 26 February 1925 (membership number 42,630). Detten also joined the SA, the Nazi Party's paramilitary organization. By 1929 he had been appointed the SA commander in Dresden, where he initially served as Stabsführer (Chief of Staff) for SA-Gruppe-Mitte (Central Group) and later transferred to SA-Gruppe Sachsen (Saxony Group). On 15 September 1932, he was promoted to SA-Gruppenführer.

At the November 1932 German parliamentary election, Detten was elected as a Nazi Party deputy to the Reichstag for electoral constituency 29, Leipzig. At the following election on 5 March 1933, he was returned for constituency 28, Dresden–Bautzen, which he represented until his death the following year.

After the Nazis came to power at the national level on 30 January 1933, they began a process of Gleichschaltung (coordination), in the course of which they assumed political and police control of the individual German states. On 10 March 1933, Detten was appointed to the Ministry of the Interior in Saxony by Reichskommissar Manfred von Killinger, and he also was appointed Oberpräsident of the Saxon Police on 6 April. On 11 July, Prussian Minister-president Hermann Göring appointed him to the recently reconstituted Prussian State Council. On 16 August, he was named as head of the Politisches Amt (Political Office) of the Supreme SA leadership in Berlin, and was primarily responsible for foreign policy issues. He was also appointed Sonderkommissar der Obersten SA-Führung für Preußen (Special Commissioner for Prussia of the Supreme SA Leadership).

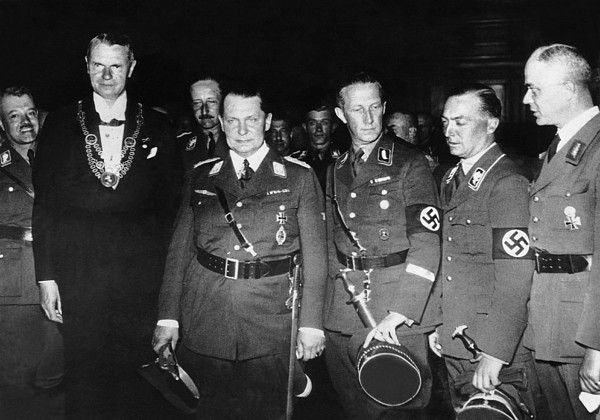
Georg von Detten (far left) with other leading Nazis in the fall of 1933: Heinrich Sahm (Lord Mayor of Berlin), Prince August Wilhelm of Prussia, Hermann Göring (Prussian Minister president), Julius Lippert (Berlin State Commissioner), Karl Ernst (Leader of the Berlin SA-Gruppe) and Artur Görlitzer (Deputy Gauleiter of Berlin)

== Murder ==
On the morning of 30 June 1934, Detten intended to travel from Munich to the spa town of Bad Wiessee, where a meeting of all senior SA leaders was to be held later that day. He was arrested by the Bavarian Political Police shortly after his arrival at the Munich central train station. From there, he first was taken to Stadelheim Prison. He then was flown to Berlin on 1 July, together with his chief of staff, SA-Oberführer Hans-Joachim von Falkenhausen, and two other senior SA leaders, SA-Obergruppenführer Fritz Ritter von Kraußer and SA-Gruppenführer Karl Schreyer. All four men were taken to the Columbia-Haus near Berlin Tempelhof Airport.

In the Columbia-Haus, the four SA leaders were informed that they had been sentenced to death for high treason and would be executed during the night. An official court martial actually never was carried out. In the early morning of 2 July 1934, Detten was taken to the grounds of the SS barracks in Berlin-Lichterfelde and shot at about 2:30 a.m. by members of the Leibstandarte SS Adolf Hitler.

== Sources ==
- Höhne, Heinz (1971). The Order of the Death's Head: The Story of Hitler's SS. New York: Ballantine Books. ISBN 0-345-28333-3.
- Klee, Ernst (2007). Das Personenlexikon zum Dritten Reich. Wer war was vor und nach 1945. Frankfurt-am-Main: Fischer-Taschenbuch-Verlag. ISBN 978-3-596-16048-8.
- Lilla, Joachim (2005). Der Preußische Staatsrat 1921–1933: Ein biographisches Handbuch. Düsseldorf: Droste Verlag. ISBN 978-3-770-05271-4.
- Lilla, Joachim; Doring, Martin; Schulz, Andreas (2004). Statisten in Uniform: Die Mitglieder des Reichstags 1933–1945. Ein biographisches Handbuch. Unter Einbeziehung der völkischen und nationalsozialistischen Reichstagsabgeordneten ab Mai 1924. Droste. ISBN 3-7700-5254-4.
