= Katzenberger Trial =

Nazi show trial

The Katzenberger Trial was a notorious Nazi show trial. A Jewish businessman and leading member of the Nuremberg Jewish community, Lehmann (Leo) Katzenberger, was accused of having an affair with a young "Aryan" woman, and on 14 March 1942 was sentenced to death. The trial's presiding judge, Oswald Rothaug, was later tried at the Nuremberg trials (see Judges' Trial) and sentenced to life imprisonment. A heavily fictionalized version of the Katzenberger Trial later provided a subplot in the 1961 film Judgment at Nuremberg.

== Background ==
Leo Katzenberger (born 28 November 1873 in Maßbach, near Bad Kissingen) and his two brothers owned a large wholesale shoe shop, as well as 30 shoe shops throughout southern Germany. Katzenberger was a leading member of the Nuremberg Jewish community, and from 1939 was chairman of the Nuremberg Jewish Cultural Organization. He had a long-standing friendship with a young photographer, Irene Seiler (née Scheffler, born 26 April 1910 in Guben), who rented rooms in an apartment house the Katzenbergers owned that was next to the firm's offices. For years, local gossips had claimed that Seiler and Katzenberger were having an affair. Both were married.

== Trial ==
An unknown person denounced Katzenberger to the authorities, and he was arrested on 18 March 1941 under the so-called Rassenschutzgesetz ("Racial Protection Law"), one of the Nuremberg Laws, which made it a criminal offence, Rassenschande ("racial defilement"), for Aryans to have sexual relations with Jews. Katzenberger consistently denied the charges, as did Seiler, who claimed their relationship was like that of a father and daughter. The investigating judge initially concluded there was too little evidence to proceed with the case, but the investigation attracted the attention of Oswald Rothaug, a judge known for his severity and fervent support for Nazism. Recognising the publicity such a trial would generate and seeing it as a way to display his Nazi credentials and further his career, Rothaug arranged for the case to be referred to him. He sent tickets for the trial to all the prominent Nazis in Nuremberg.

No conclusive evidence was presented during the trial that Katzenberger and Seiler had ever had an affair (Seiler had been Katzenberger's tenant since 1932), let alone that it had continued during the war. The law at the time did not call for the death sentence for breaking the Rassenschutzgesetz; the normal sentence would have been several years' imprisonment. Despite this, however, the Volkschädlingsgesetz, a wartime law, allowed capital punishment if one made use of wartime regulations such as the blackout to commit a crime. Based on a single eyewitness account that Katzenberger had left Seiler's apartment "when it was already dark", Rothaug applied this law to sentence Katzenberger to death.

== Aftermath ==
Katzenberger was guillotined at Stadelheim Prison in Munich on 2 June 1942. Seiler was found guilty of perjury for denying an affair had taken place and sentenced to two years' imprisonment: in accordance with Adolf Hitler's wishes, women were not charged under the Racial Protection Law, but could be charged with perjury or obstruction of justice. She died in July 1984 in Apolda, East Germany, aged 74.

Even among some Nazi officials, the tenuous grounds on which Katzenberger had been sentenced to death caused disquiet. Rothaug was moved to a state attorney's job in Berlin in 1943 because Justice Minister Otto Georg Thierack considered him unfit to be a judge. In 1947 the Americans tried Rothaug, partly for his role in the Katzenberger trial, and sentenced him to life imprisonment. Rothaug was released in December 1956, aged 59, and died in Cologne in 1967, aged 70.
