= Judgment at Nuremberg =

1961 film by Stanley Kramer

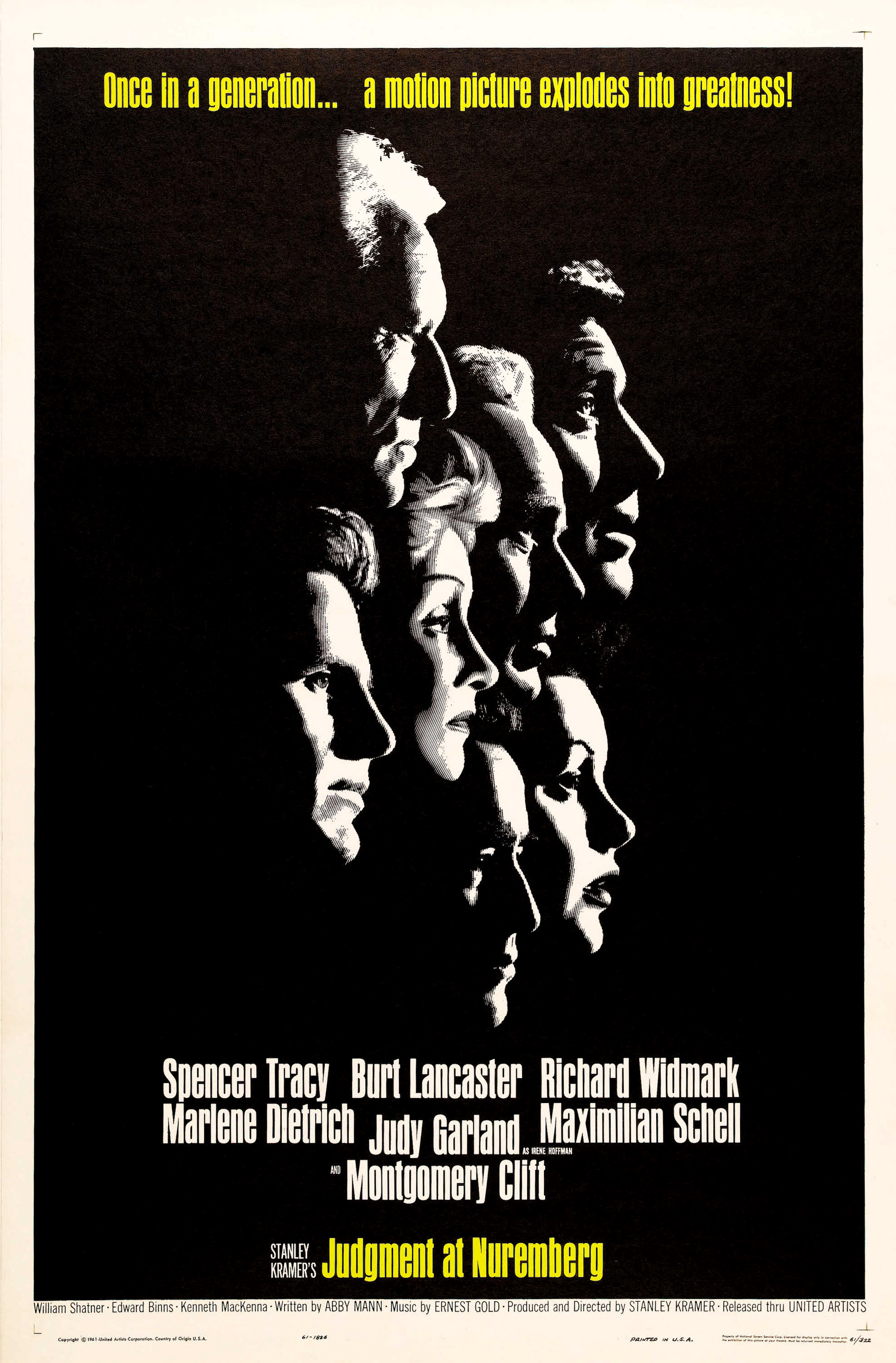
- Theatrical release poster
- Directed by: Stanley Kramer
- Screenplay by: Abby Mann
- Based on: "Judgment at Nuremberg" by Abby Mann
- Produced by: Stanley Kramer
- Starring: Spencer Tracy; Burt Lancaster; Richard Widmark; Marlene Dietrich; Maximilian Schell; Judy Garland; Montgomery Clift; William Shatner; Edward Binns; Kenneth MacKenna
- Cinematography: Ernest Laszlo
- Edited by: Frederic Knudtson
- Music by: Ernest Gold
- Production companies: Roxlom Films; Amber Entertainment
- Distributed by: United Artists
- Release dates: December 14, 1961 (Kongresshalle, Berlin); December 19, 1961 (United States)
- Running time: 179 minutes
- Country: United States
- Languages: English; German
- Budget: $3 million
- Box office: $16 million

Judgment at Nuremberg is a 1961 American epic legal drama film directed and produced by Stanley Kramer, and written by Abby Mann. It features Spencer Tracy, Burt Lancaster, Richard Widmark, Maximilian Schell, Werner Klemperer, Marlene Dietrich, Judy Garland, William Shatner, and Montgomery Clift. Set in Nuremberg, in the then American occupation zone in Germany, the film depicts a fictionalized version – with fictional characters – of the Judges' Trial of 1947, one of the twelve Nuremberg Military Tribunals conducted under the auspices of the U.S. military in the aftermath of World War II.

The film centers on a military tribunal led by Chief Trial Judge Dan Haywood (Tracy), before which four judges and prosecutors (as compared to sixteen defendants in the actual Judges' Trial) stand accused of crimes against humanity due to their senior roles in the judicial system of the Nazi German government. The trial centers on questions regarding Germans' individual and collective responsibility for the Holocaust, with the backdrop of a tense international situation including the onset of the Cold War, the Berlin Blockade, and the geopolitical ramification of the later Nuremberg Trials upon German support for the Western Bloc, placing great pressure on Haywood's efforts to reach a just verdict. In addition, the judge faces emotional challenges in his personal relationships with German people outside the courtroom who consistently claim ignorance of Nazi atrocities, but who the judge suspects may have known more than they will admit.

An earlier version of the story was broadcast as an episode of the same name on the television series Playhouse 90 in 1959. Popular interest in this effort caused an expanded focus on its dramatic elements. Maximillian Schell and Werner Klemperer portrayed the same characters in both productions.

In 2013, Judgment at Nuremberg was selected for preservation in the United States National Film Registry by the Library of Congress as being "culturally, historically, or aesthetically significant". The production's presentation of historical events has attracted interest for decades since its release due to its place in the narrative portrayals of the Holocaust in film.

== Plot ==
A military tribunal convened in Nuremberg, Germany, involves four German judges and prosecutors standing accused of crimes against humanity for their involvement in atrocities committed under the Nazi regime.

Dan Haywood heads a panel of Allied jurists who will hear and decide the case against the defendants. Haywood is particularly interested in learning how the defendant Ernst Janning, a respected jurist and legal scholar, could have committed the atrocities he is accused of, including sentencing innocent people to death.

Haywood seeks to understand how the German people could have been deaf and blind to the Nazi regime's crimes. In doing so, he befriends Frau Bertholt — the widow of a German general executed by the Allies — whose family home has been commandeered by the Americans and is serving as Haywood's residence during the trial. He talks with other Germans who have varying perspectives on the war.

Other characters the judge meets are US Army Captain Harrison Byers, who is assigned to assist the American judges hearing the case, and Irene Hoffmann, who is afraid to provide testimony that may bolster the prosecution's case against the judges. (Hoffman's character bears a resemblance to Irene Seiler, a key figure in the notorious Nazi kangaroo court case, the Katzenberger Trial.)

German defense attorney Hans Rolfe argues that the defendants were not the only ones to aid or ignore the Nazi regime. He claims the United States has committed acts just as bad or worse than the Nazis, such as US Supreme Court Justice Oliver Wendell Holmes Jr.'s support for the first eugenics practices; the German-Vatican Reichskonkordat of 1933, which the Nazi-dominated German government exploited as an implicit early foreign recognition of Nazi leadership; Joseph Stalin's part in the Nazi-Soviet Pact of 1939, which removed the last major obstacle to Germany's invasion and occupation of western Poland, initiating World War II; and the atomic bombings of Hiroshima and Nagasaki in the final stage of the war in August 1945.

Meanwhile, as a strict constructionist jurist, Janning refuses to testify or participate in a legal proceeding that he profoundly feels is no better than a post-WWII Western kangaroo court of its own. As the proceeding becomes more and more intolerable to him, he dramatically breaks his silence. He chooses to testify before the Tribunal as a witness for the prosecution, admitting he is guilty of condemning to death a Jewish man of "blood defilement" charges — namely, that the man had sex with a 16-year-old Gentile girl — when he knew there was no evidence to support such a verdict. Janning explains that misled people such as him helped Adolf Hitler's antisemitic, racist policies out of naive patriotism despite knowing it was wrong, and that all of Germany bears some measure of responsibility for the atrocities committed by the Nazi regime.

Haywood must weigh considerations of geopolitical expediency against his own ideals of justice. The trial is set against the background of the Berlin Blockade, and there is pressure to let the German defendants off lightly to gain German support in the growing Cold War against the Soviet Union.

While the four defendants maintain their pleas of "not guilty" in their closing statements, Janning and fellow defendant, Werner Lampe, show clear remorse for their actions, while a third, Friedrich Hofstetter, claims they had no choice but to execute the laws handed down by Hitler's government. Only the fourth defendant, Emil Hahn, remains unrepentant, telling the Americans that they will live to regret not allying with the Nazis against the Soviet Union. Ultimately, all are found guilty and sentenced to life in prison.

Haywood places a phone call, but hangs up when it is unanswered. He receives his travel documents from Byers and tells him to give his best to his German girlfriend. Byers, responding that "Americans aren't very popular in Nuremberg this morning," implies that they broke up in the wake of the verdicts. Haywood dials the phone once again; it's revealed he is trying to reach Frau Bertholt, who tearfully ignores the call.

Rolfe goes to Haywood as he is departing Germany to inform him that Janning wishes him to visit, and he predicts that no defendant will stay in prison for more than 5 years. Haywood replies that Rolfe's position may be logical but without reverence for justice.

On his way out of Nuremberg, Haywood visits the prison. Janning affirms to Haywood that his verdict was a just one, but asks him to believe that, regarding the mass murder of innocents, he never knew that it would come to that. Judge Haywood replies it came to that the first time Janning condemned a man he knew to be innocent.

As Haywood leaves the cell block, a title card says that, of 99 defendants sentenced to prison terms in Nuremberg trials that took place in the American Zone, none are still serving a sentence. (Note: This does not refer to the 1946 Nuremberg trials of the leadership of Nazi Germany, which was in front of an international panel of judges, not solely American ones. Of the 20 defendants in that trial, as of 1961 when this film was released, three men still remained in prison: Rudolf Hess, Albert Speer and Baldur von Schirach.)

== Cast ==
- Spencer Tracy as Chief Judge Dan Haywood
- Burt Lancaster as defendant Dr. Ernst Janning
- Richard Widmark as prosecutor Col. Tad Lawson
- Maximilian Schell as defense counsel Hans Rolfe
- Marlene Dietrich as Frau Bertholt
- Montgomery Clift as Rudolph Petersen
- Judy Garland as Irene Hoffmann
- William Shatner as Captain Harrison Byers
- Howard Caine as Hugo Wallner – Irene's husband
- Werner Klemperer as defendant Emil Hahn
- John Wengraf as His Honour Herr Justizrat Dr. Karl Wieck – former Minister of Justice in Weimar Germany
- Karl Swenson as Dr. Heinrich Geuter, Feldenstein's lawyer
- Ben Wright as Herr Halbestadt, Haywood's butler
- Virginia Christine as Mrs. Halbestadt, Haywood's housekeeper
- Edward Binns as Senator Burkette
- Torben Meyer as defendant Werner Lampe
- Martin Brandt as defendant Friedrich Hofstetter
- Kenneth MacKenna as Judge Kenneth Norris
- Ray Teal as Judge Curtiss Ives
- Alan Baxter as Brig. Gen. Matt Merrin
- Joseph Bernard as Major Abe Radnitz, Lawson's assistant
- Olga Fabian as Mrs. Elsa Lindnow, witness in Feldenstein case
- Otto Waldis as Oswald Pohl
- Paul Busch as Schmidt
- Bernard Kates as Max Perkins

== Production ==
=== Background ===
The film's events relate principally to actions committed by the German state against its own racial, social, religious, and eugenic groupings within its "in the name of the law" (from the prosecution's opening statement in the film), from the time of Hitler's rise to power in 1933. The plot development and thematic treatment question the legitimacy of the social, political, and alleged legal foundations of these actions.

The real Judges' Trial focused on 16 judges and prosecutors who served before and during the Nazi regime in Germany, and who embraced and enforced laws—passively, actively, or both—that led to judicial acts of compulsory sexual sterilization and to the imprisonment and execution of people for their religions, racial or ethnic identities, political beliefs, and physical handicaps or disabilities.

A key thread in the film's plot involves a "race defilement" trial known as the Feldenstein case. In this fictionalized case, based on the real life Katzenberger Trial, an elderly Jewish man had been tried for having a "relationship" (sexual acts) with an Aryan (German) 16-year-old girl, an act that had been legally defined as a crime under the Nuremberg Laws, which had been enacted by the German Reichstag. Under these laws, the man was found guilty and was put to death in 1942. Using this and other examples, the movie explores individual conscience, collective guilt, and behavior during a time of widespread societal immorality.

The film is notable for its use of courtroom drama to illuminate individual perfidy and moral compromise in times of violent political upheaval; it was the first mainstream drama film to not shy away from showing actual footage filmed by American and British soldiers after the liberation of the Nazi concentration camps. Shown in court by prosecuting attorney Colonel Tad Lawson (Richard Widmark), the scenes of huge piles of naked corpses laid out in rows and bulldozed into large pits were considered exceptionally graphic for a mainstream film of the time.

According to numerous sources, Tracy's climactic monologue was filmed in one take using several cameras. Clift had trouble remembering his lines, so Kramer told him to do the best he could, correctly figuring that Clift's nervousness would be central to his character's mental state. (Clift was so eager to do the film that he worked just for expenses.) Lancaster speaks only three lines (none in the courtroom) until his lengthy monologue roughly 135 minutes into the film. Meanwhile Garland was so happy to be working in a motion picture again after seven years away that it took her a while to get into the proper frame of mind to break down and cry.

== Soundtrack ==
- "Lili Marleen"
  - Music by Norbert Schultze (1938)
  - Lyrics by Hans Leip (1915)
- "Liebeslied"
  - Music by Ernest Gold
  - Lyrics by Alfred Perry
- "Wenn wir marschieren"
  - German folk song (ca. 1910)
- “Wenn die Soldaten”
  - German folk song (ca. 1840)
- "Care for Me"
  - By Ernest Gold
- "Notre amour ne peur"
  - By Ernest Gold
- "Du, du liegst mir im Herzen"
  - German folk song, arrangement by Ernest Gold
- "Piano Sonata No. 8 in C minor, Op. 13"
  - By Ludwig van Beethoven

== Reception ==
The world premiere was held on December 14, 1961, at the Kongresshalle in West Berlin, Germany. 300 journalists from 22 countries were in attendance and earphones offering the soundtrack dubbed in German, Spanish, Italian and French were made available. The reaction from the audience was reportedly subdued, with some applauding at the finish, but most of the Germans in attendance leaving in silence.

Kramer's film received positive reviews from critics and was lauded as a straight reconstruction of the famous trials of Nazi war criminals. The cast was especially praised, including Tracy, Lancaster, Schell, Clift and Garland. The film's release was perfectly timed, as its subject coincided with the trial and conviction in Israel of Nazi SS officer Adolf Eichmann.

Bosley Crowther of The New York Times declared it "a powerful, persuasive film" with "a stirring, sobering message to the world". Variety wrote: "With the most painful pages of modern history as its bitter basis, Abby Mann's intelligent, thought-provoking screenplay is a grim reminder of man's responsibility to denounce grave evils of which he is aware. The lesson is carefully, tastefully and upliftingly told via Kramer's large-scale production." Harrison's Reports awarded its top grade of "Excellent", praising Kramer for employing "an ingenious device of fluid direction" and Spencer Tracy for "a performance of compelling substance".

Brendan Gill of The New Yorker called the film "a bold and, despite its great length, continuously exciting picture", which asks questions that "are among the biggest that can be asked and are no less fresh and thrilling for being thousands of years old". Gill added that the cast was so loaded with stars "that it occasionally threatens to turn into a judicial Grand Hotel. Luckily, they all work hard to stay inside their roles." Richard L. Coe of The Washington Post declared it "an extraordinary film, both in concept and handling. Those who see this at the Warner will recognize that the screen has been put to noble use."

The Monthly Film Bulletin of Britain dissented, writing in a mostly negative review that "this large-scale trial film undermines faith in its philosophical and historical merit by colouring the better part of its message with hackneyed court-room hysteria", explaining that "in a series of contrived scenes ... the point is hammered home right down to the last shock-cut. The same specious technique (zoom-lens shots and camera-circlings predominant) and showmanship turn the trial into little more than a travesty—notably in the melodramatic switch in the character of Janning."

The film grossed $6 million in the United States and $10 million in worldwide release.

The television network premiere of the film was shown on ABC on 7 March 1965; it was interrupted to show news footage of the violence on "Bloody Sunday" during the Selma to Montgomery marches. The juxtaposition of the film about Nazi atrocities and the news footage of violence against African-American people resulted in sympathy and greater support for the civil rights cause.

Alex von Tunzelmann of The Guardian gave the film a grade of B, saying: "Judgment at Nuremberg doesn't stick precisely to the facts of the judges' trial, but its fictionalisations are intelligent. It raises complex questions, resists easy answers, and leaves the viewer keen to think and know more. For those reasons, it's an exceptionally good historical film – and a haunting one."

=== Awards and nominations ===
Award	Category	Nominee(s)	Result	Ref.
Academy Awards	Best Motion Picture	Stanley Kramer	Nominated	
Academy Awards	Best Director	Stanley Kramer	Nominated	
Academy Awards	Best Actor	Maximilian Schell	Won	
Academy Awards	Best Actor	Spencer Tracy	Nominated	
Academy Awards	Best Supporting Actor	Montgomery Clift	Nominated	
Academy Awards	Best Supporting Actress	Judy Garland	Nominated	
Academy Awards	Best Screenplay – Based on Material from Another Medium	Abby Mann	Won	
Academy Awards	Best Art Direction – Black-and-White	Art Direction: Rudolph Sternad; Set Decoration: George Milo	Nominated	
Academy Awards	Best Cinematography – Black-and-White	Ernest Laszlo	Nominated	
Academy Awards	Best Costume Design – Black-and-White	Jean Louis	Nominated	
Academy Awards	Best Film Editing	Frederic Knudtson	Nominated	
Academy Awards	Irving G. Thalberg Memorial Award	Stanley Kramer	Won	
American Cinema Editors Awards	Best Edited Feature Film	Frederic Knudtson	Nominated	
Bodil Awards	Best Non-European Film	Stanley Kramer	Won	
British Academy Film Awards	Best Film		Nominated	
British Academy Film Awards	Best Foreign Actor	Montgomery Clift	Nominated	
British Academy Film Awards	Best Foreign Actor	Maximilian Schell	Nominated	
Cinema Writers Circle Awards	Best Foreign Film		Won	
David di Donatello Awards	Best Foreign Production		Won	
David di Donatello Awards	Best Foreign Actor	Spencer Tracy	Won (Note: Tied with Anthony Perkins for Goodbye Again.)	
David di Donatello Awards	David Giovani Award	Marlene Dietrich	Won	
Directors Guild of America Awards	Outstanding Directorial Achievement in Motion Pictures	Stanley Kramer	Nominated	
Golden Globe Awards	Best Motion Picture – Drama		Nominated	
Golden Globe Awards	Best Actor in a Motion Picture – Drama	Maximilian Schell	Won	
Golden Globe Awards	Best Supporting Actor – Motion Picture	Montgomery Clift	Nominated	
Golden Globe Awards	Best Supporting Actress – Motion Picture	Judy Garland	Nominated	
Golden Globe Awards	Best Director – Motion Picture	Stanley Kramer	Won	
Golden Globe Awards	Best Film Promoting International Understanding		Nominated	
Laurel Awards	Top Drama		Nominated	
Laurel Awards	Top Male Dramatic Performance	Maximilian Schell	Nominated	
Laurel Awards	Top Male Supporting Performance	Montgomery Clift	Nominated	
Laurel Awards	Top Female Supporting Performance	Judy Garland	Nominated	
Laurel Awards	Top Cinematography – Black and White	Ernest Laszlo	Nominated	
Nastro d'Argento	Best Foreign Director	Stanley Kramer	Won	
National Board of Review Awards	Top Ten Films		8th Place	
National Film Preservation Board	National Film Registry		Inducted	
New York Film Critics Circle Awards	Best Film		Nominated	
New York Film Critics Circle Awards	Best Actor	Maximilian Schell	Won	
New York Film Critics Circle Awards	Best Screenplay	Abby Mann	Won	
Online Film & Television Association Awards	Film Hall of Fame: Productions		Inducted	
Writers Guild of America Awards	Best Written American Drama	Abby Mann	Nominated	

- In June 2008, the American Film Institute revealed its "Ten Top Ten" after polling over 1,500 people from the creative community. Judgment at Nuremberg was acknowledged as the tenth best film in the courtroom drama genre. Additionally, the film had been nominated for AFI's 100 Years...100 Movies.

== Release ==
Judgment at Nuremberg was released in American theatres on December 19, 1961.

CBS/Fox Video first released the film as a two-VHS cassette set in 1986. MGM re-released the VHS version in 1991, while the 1996 and 2001 reissues were part of the Vintage Classics and Screen Epics collection respectively. In addition, the special edition DVD was released on September 7, 2004.

Three Blu-ray versions of the film were also produced. A limited edition Blu-ray was released by Twilight Time on November 14, 2014. Kino Lorber re-released the Blu-ray as a standard release in 2018. The BFI released a 2-disc Blu-ray on January 20, 2020.

The Australian Blu-ray was released as part of The Hollywood Gold Series.

== Stage adaptations ==
In 1985, a Soviet stage adaptation of the film under the title Judgment was produced for Baltic House Festival Theatre, with Gennady Egorov as director.

In 2001, another stage adaptation of the film was produced on Broadway, starring Schell (this time in the role of Ernst Janning) and George Grizzard, with John Tillinger as director. It ran at the Longacre Theatre from February 15, 2001 to May 13, 2001, totaling 101 performances (45 previews and 56 regular performances). The production received 2 Tony Award nominations; Tony Award for Best Featured Actor in a Play (Michael Hayden) and Tony Award for Best Featured Actress in a Play (Marthe Keller).

== See also ==
- German Concentration Camps Factual Survey, British and American army film of the camps
- List of Holocaust films
- Message picture
- Nuremberg Trials (a Soviet film on the trials)
- Spencer Tracy filmography
- Trial films
- War crimes trials
- Nuremberg, a 2000 TV miniseries about the actual Nuremberg Trials
- Nuremberg, a 2025 American historical drama film by James Vanderbilt
