= Adele Stürzl =

Austrian communist resistance fighter

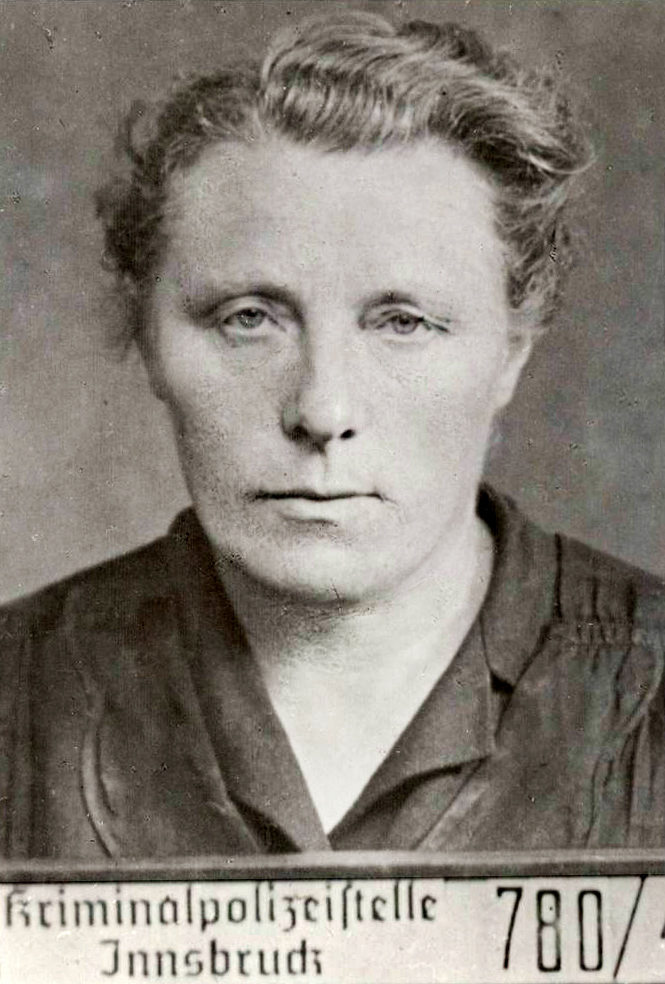
Adele Stürzl after being arrested ca. 1942

Adele Stürzl (November 23, 1892 – June 30, 1944 or August 16, 1944) was an Austrian communist and resistance fighter against National Socialism.

== Life ==
Stürzl was born in Vienna. Her parents were originally from South Bohemia near Znojmo. She worked as a maid in her youth. In Vienna she came into contact with the Social Democratic workers movement. In Budapest, she met her husband. Together, the couple moved to Kufstein in Tyrol in May 1918, right before World War I ended.

In Kufstein, Adele Stürzl was an activist for labour rights. She managed for female workers in an arms factory to get a raise. She was an active member of the Social Democratic Party and then the Communist Party. When the Communist Party was prohibited in 1933, she was arrested for a short time. She was again arrested in 1934 and 1935.

After Austria was annexed by Nazi Germany, she was active in the resistance against the regime. She collaborated with other resistance fighters around the Robert Uhrig group and they regularly met at her house. She was arrested in June 1942 and was suspected of trying to bring a deserter out of the country to Switzerland in April 1942. On May 1, 1942 she tried to organize a hunger demonstration of housewives at the main square in Kufstein. In November 1942, Stürzl was convicted in Innsbruck of helping a deserter and sentenced to four years in prison. On April 14, 1944, she was sentenced to death by the People's Court.

Either on June 30, 1944 or August 16, 1944, she was executed in Stadelheim Prison in Munich.

== Remembrance ==
A small street in Kufstein was named after her called Adele-Stürzl-Weg.
