= Christl-Marie Schultes =

First female Bavarian aviator

- Christl-Marie Schultes, in the 1930s
- Born: 6 November 1904; Geigant, Kingdom of Bavaria, German Empire
- Died: 9 March 1976 (aged 71); Munich, Bavaria, West Germany
- Known for: First female aviator in Bavaria
- Aviation career
- First flight: 1928

Christl-Marie Schultes (6 November 1904 – 9 March 1976) was a German aviator, the first female aviator in Bavaria, and a survivor of Ravensbrück concentration camp.

== Life ==
Born in Geigant near Waldmünchen, Christl-Marie Schultes grew up in Oberenzenau near Bad Heilbrunn. Claiming to attend a cookery course, she traveled to Berlin and enrolled in flying lessons. She became the first female Bavarian aviator in 1928 and bought her first plane, a Gipsy Moth, which she named Bad Tölz in 1929.

She crashed her plane in the Fichtelgebirge in 1930, surviving unharmed. In May 1931 her left leg was amputated after a crash near Passau at the beginning of her planned flight around the world; she resumed flying six months later. In May 1933, Schultes founded the "Deutsche Flugillustrierte" in Berlin.

During the Nazi era, Schultes was persecuted for her political beliefs and had her property expropriated, as she did not want to break off her engagement to her Jewish fiancée. Emigrating first to Switzerland in 1934, and then to France in 1936, she was interned in 1941 due to her support for people persecuted by the regime. Deported to Ravensbrück concentration camp and released in 1943, she worked at Dornier until her second arrest in 1944 for Wehrkraftzersetzung (sedition). Saved from her planned execution in Stadelheim Prison, she was liberated by the American army on 1 May 1945.

She continued her humanitarian work after the war, dying in poverty in Schwabing, Munich in 1976.

== Honors ==
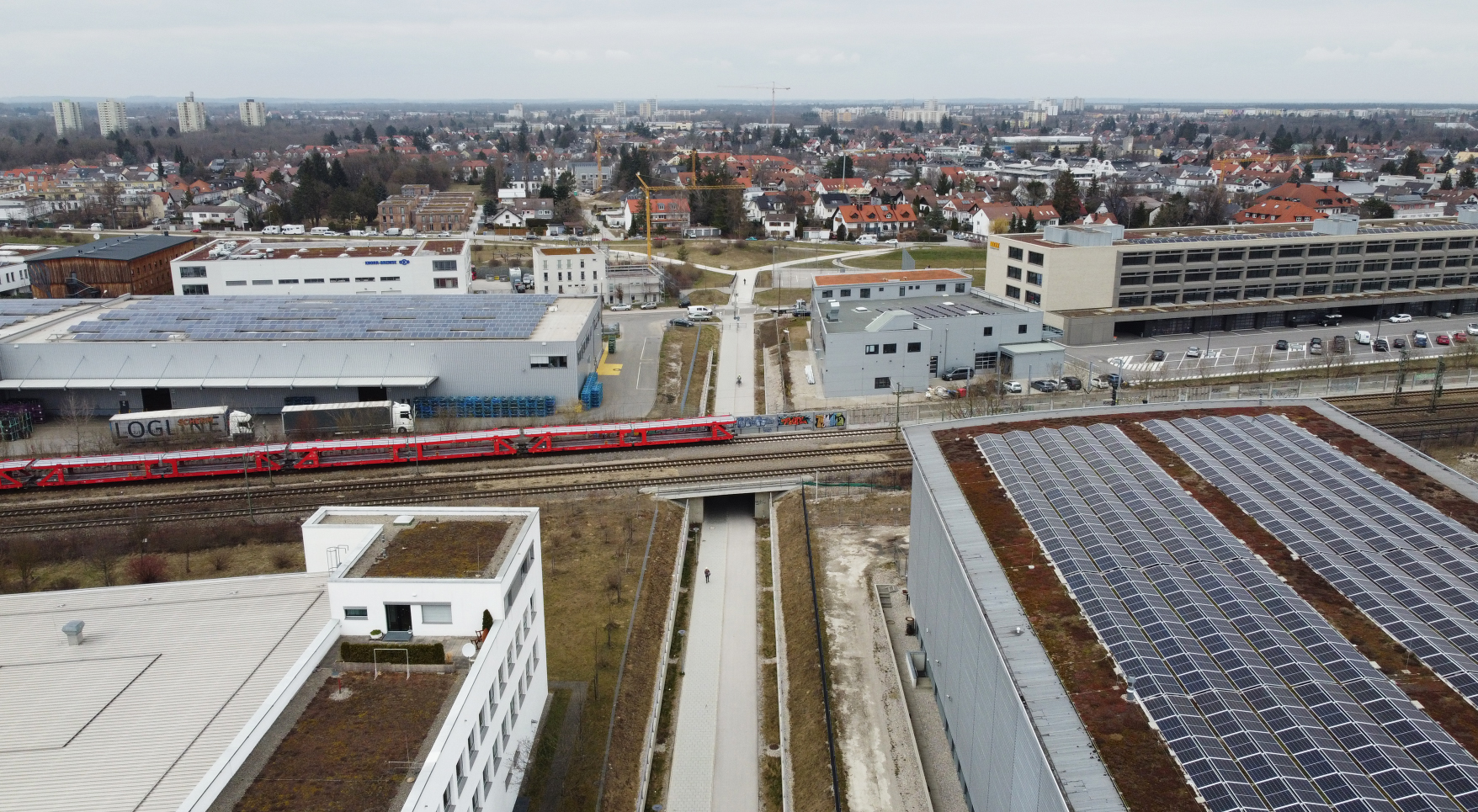
The Christl-Marie-Schultes-Weg from the air

The Christl-Marie-Schultes-Weg, a combined walking and cycle path below the Nordring between the Wilhelmine-Reichard-Straße and Am Oberwiesenfeld roads in Milbertshofen-Am Hart, is named for her.

== Bibliography ==
- Probst, Ernst; Lederer, Theo (2010). Christl-Marie Schultes: die erste Fliegerin in Bayern. Dokument ... aus dem GRIN-Verlagsprogramm (1. Aufl ed.). Norderstedt: GRIN-Verl. ISBN 978-3-640-72625-7.
- Schmidt-Thomé, Adelheid (2022). "Maria Rosalia (Christl-Marie) Schultes". Ich war die Erste: bayerische Pionierinnen im Porträt (Originalausgabe ed.). München: Allitera Verlag. pp. 102f. ISBN 978-3-96233-307-2.
