= Adalbert Probst =

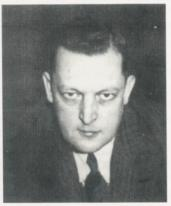
Adalbert Probst

Adalbert Probst (1900–1934) was a Catholic Youth leader in Germany during Nazi period. He was killed during Hitler's 1934 Night of the Long Knives purge. Probst was national director of the Catholic Youth Sports Association. The Catholic Church in Germany had resisted attempts by the new Nazi Government to close its youth organisations. Probst, along with Erich Klausener (head of Catholic Action) and Fritz Gerlich (editor of Munich's Catholic weekly, Der Gerade Weg) were among the high-profile Catholic opposition figures targeted for assassination in the Night of the Long Knives of the summer of 1934, an early effort by Hitler to assert his dominance of German politics through violence. Probst was abducted and later found dead, allegedly "shot while trying to escape".

== See also ==
- DJK-Sportverband
- Victims of the Night of the Long Knives
- Catholic Church and Nazi Germany
- Catholic resistance to Nazi Germany
