= Volksschädling =

Volksschädling (German: human pests) is a derogatory term that gained use during the Nazi era, characterising people as "harmful organisms" due to their non-conformist behavior, with the intention of dehumanizing and degrading them as vermin. The term originated earlier, having been mentioned in literature since 1896 and was used in various contexts at the beginning of the 20th century.

== Before the Nazi takeover ==
In the early days of the Nazi Party the term was used to describe "traffickers and usurers" and from 1930 the term was also used for alleged traitors to the Nation.

== During the war ==
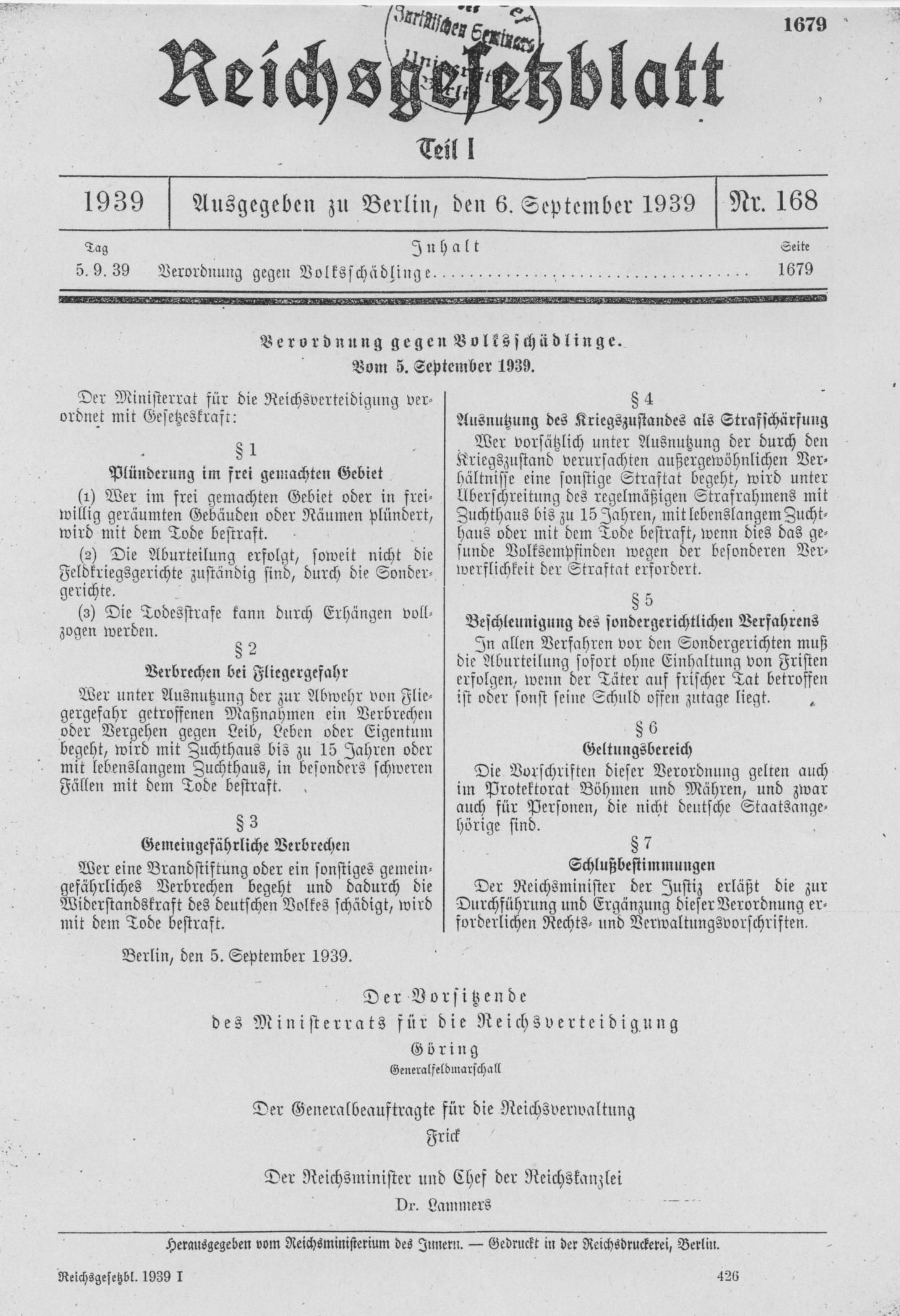
Page 1679 from the Reichsgesetzblatt I with the Ordinance against ‘Pests harmful to the Common Good of the Country’ of September 5, 1939

From 1939, the designation became a legal term through its use in the Ordinance against ‘Pests harmful to the Common Good of the Country’ of 5 September 1939. According to § 4 of this ordinance, a person who "intentionally commits a criminal offence by exploiting the extraordinary circumstances caused by the state of war" was regarded as a Pest harmful to the Common Good of the Country. In this case, the offender was punished "by exceeding the regular penalty of imprisonment for up to 15 years, life imprisonment or death, if this was required by the justified popular sentiment because of the particular reprehensibility of the offence".

In the ordinance of 1939, the following type of crimes were enumerated:

- Looting in cleared areas.
- Crimes during air raid warnings
- Malicious destruction, such as arson
- Using the war conditions to commit crimes

== Roland Freisler's interpretation ==
Roland Freisler, then Prussian State Secretary for Justice, wrote in the legal journal Deutsche Justiz, 1939, p. 1450:

"The ordinance puts four offences at the top, they are more than offences, they are plastic images of criminals:

1. that of the looter,
2. that of the cowardly perpetrator,
3. that of the dangerous Saboteur,
4. that of the economic saboteur."

== Deserters ==
The content of the term Volksschädling, which was not conclusively defined in the ordinance, expanded increasingly during the course of National Socialist legal practice and, shortly before the end of the war, was used primarily to refer to deserters. In March 1945 Victor Klemperer reports of a group of field police officers wearing an armband with the inscription "Volksschädlingsbekämpfer”.

The handling of charges relating to this Regulation was mainly assigned to the special courts. During the war, the jurisdiction of the special courts was extended to include "normal" offences. This made it possible to convict "enemies of the state" (political variant) or "Pests harmful to the Common Good of the People" (general variant), if they were also "dangerous habitual criminals", to extended terms of imprisonment.

== See also ==
- Enemy of the people
- Life unworthy of life
- Jewish parasite
- Propaganda in Nazi Germany
