= Anton von Hohberg und Buchwald =

SS officer (1885–1934)

- Born: 21 September 1885; Wismar, Mecklenburg-Schwerin, German Empire
- Died: 2 July 1934 (aged 48); Dulzen, East Prussia, Nazi Germany
- Spouse: Gertrud von Rheinbaben (1909–1912, divorced)
- Military career
- Allegiance: German Empire
- Branch: Prussian Army
- Service years: –1918
- Rank: Rittmeister; SS–Obersturmführer
- Conflicts: World War I
- Other work: SS Cavalry leader (East Prussa)

Anton Freiherr von Hohberg und Buchwald (21 September 1885 – 2 July 1934) was a German officer in the Prussian Army and also in the Schutzstaffel (SS). He was murdered during the Night of the Long Knives.

== Life ==
Hohberg was born in Wismar, Mecklenburg-Schwerin, and started a career as a Cavalry officer in the German Imperial Army. He served throughout World War I as a Rittmeister (captain) and was retired after 1918. After his dismissal, he went to his family's manor in Dulzen near Preussisch Eylau, East Prussia, where he started to work as a farmer. In 1909 he married Gertrud von Rheinbaben (1888–1949), daughter of Prussian Minister of Interior and Finances Georg von Rheinbaben, but divorced in 1912 after a duel with Horst von Blumenthal, whom she then married. Around 1930 he joined the National Socialist German Workers' Party and was temporarily a member of the staff of East Prussian SS leader Erich von dem Bach-Zelewski, but came into personal conflicts with him.

On 14 May 1934, Hohberg was dismissed as SS–Oberabschnittsreiterführer (regional SS Cavalry leader) with a rank of SS-Obersturmführer (first lieutenant). During the Night of the Long Knives, von dem Bach gave the order to kill Hohberg. Most probably on 2 July 1934, Hohberg was shot in his manor house in Dulzen by SS-Scharführer Zummach (von dem Bach's chauffeur) and SS-Obersturmführer Carl Reinhard. Hohberg was one of the few SS-members, and probably the highest-ranking one, killed in the Röhm-Putsch.

== Aftermath ==
Von dem Bach-Zelewski was a high-ranking SS-officer throughout World War II. On 16 January 1961, he was prosecuted for the killing and sentenced to four years and 6 months imprisonment by a West German court for manslaughter. He died in custody in 1972.
