= Otto Ballerstedt =

German engineer, writer and politician (1887–1934)

Otto Ballerstedt (1 April 1887 – 30 June 1934) was a German engineer, writer and politician. Ballerstedt was mainly known as leader of the secessionist Bayernbund and as a political rival of Adolf Hitler in the early days of his political career who caused Hitler to be jailed for a month in 1922.

== Life and work ==
=== Empire and the First World War ===
Ballerstedt was born in Munich. He was the son of Dr. Otto Ballerstedt Senior, a well-known editor of the Münchner Neueste Nachrichten, and his wife Julie, née Lagel. His uncle, Max Ballerstedt, was a famous paleontologist. Ballerstedt completed his engineering studies with a degree in electrical engineering. In the First World War Ballerstedt was a Bavarian Army officer. In August 1914, he was wounded in the head and lost an eye. Towards the end of the war he made his first political move: In April 1918, he demanded the Bavarian King Ludwig III petition on not allowing the newly acquired territories to fall to Prussia, against the backdrop of the extensive German territorial gains in the peace treaty of Brest-Litovsk with Russia. As Prussia was already considered too powerful within the Federation of German territories, he thought an annexation of the Baltic States to Prussia would allow its influence to grow further.

=== Bayernbund and engagement with Hitler ===
After the German defeat in the autumn of 1918 Ballerstedt founded the at times very successful Bayernbund, accentuating regional autonomy and the peculiarities of regional political organization that aimed at a reorganisation of the German Reich on a "strictly federal basis". Ballerstedt - "white blue" and monarchist-minded - thought that, while respecting the unity of the Empire, the inner autonomy and independence of the individual federal States should be significantly strengthened. As the founder and leader of the Bayernbund, Ballerstedt was a very prominent figure in the politics of the State and its capital in the early 1920s. Adolf Hitler, who entered the political arena at that time, looked at the "separatists" - as he called Ballerstedt's organisation - as a rival and had violent conflicts for a while with the Bayernbund; he attacked editorially and physically by raiding its political rallies with militant thugs. Hitler described Ballerstedt later in one of his monologues in the Fuehrer's headquarters during the Second World War in retrospect as his most dangerous opponent on the field of activity as a public speaker.

On 14 September 1921, there was a highly publicized incident, when Hitler, Hermann Esser, Oskar Körner (later to die in the Beer Hall Putsch) and some other NSDAP supporters stormed a Ballerstedt meeting in the Munich Löwenbräukeller in order to prevent him giving a lecture. Hitler achieved this goal by drastic measures: He reached Ballerstedt, then assaulted and injured him severely. Ballerstedt was then forcibly dragged out of the Hall. As a result, Hitler was on trial from 27 to 29 January 1922 on charges of a breach of the peace, public indecency and assault. He and Esser were convicted and sentenced to imprisonment for 100 days and payment of 1,000 Reichsmark. The prison sentence was served from 24 June to 27 July 1922 in Munich Stadelheim prison, where Hitler remained only a month.

=== Later years of life and assassination ===
From 1925, Ballerstedt moved more and more into the background politically. In the early 1930s, he moved to the writing of photographically illustrated landscape and cultural-heritage books.

Ballerstedt was arrested on the evening of 30 June 1934 by armed SS men in his Munich apartment, a day before going on a planned trip to Austria. He was killed during the Night of the Long Knives in or near Dachau concentration camp. His body was found on the morning of 1 July in the forest near Gündinger Neuhimmelreich. The autopsy revealed that he had died by a shot to the back of the head. At the same time as he was shot, Fritz Beck, Fritz Gerlich, Wilhelm Eduard Schmid and the housekeeper Ernestine Zoref were also murdered.

Ballerstedt probably fell victim to Hitler's personal revenge.

Today a street in Munich is named after him, the Ballerstedtstraße.

== Writings ==
- Grosspreussen und Reichszertrümmerung. Der deutsche Partikularismus und Deutschlands Zukunft, 1918.
- Um die Zugspitzbahn. Als Manuskript gedruckt, 1925.
- Aus unserer Bergwelt. Text und Bilder, 1930.
- Die Wunderwelt der Alpen. 71 Abbildungen aus dem Gebiet Oberammergau, 1930.
- Die Gebirgsphotographie. Ein Feld der Freude für Jeden Photographierenden, 1934.
