= German Youth Power Sports Association =

DJK logo

German Youth Power Sports Association (German: Deutsche Jugendkraft Sportverband, DJK) is a Catholic-sponsored sports association in Germany. Founded as a faith-based organization, today it is open to anyone who supports its goals. The concept of Jugendkraft or "youth power" is common to many countries and cultures, as in the Italian Juventus, and conveys the positive aspects of youthful energy and creativity.

== History ==
The DJK was established in Würzburg in 1920 under the leadership of Monsignor Carl Mostert and was active nationally until 1933 and the rise to power of the Nazis. Faith-based and worker's organizations were regarded as politically unpalatable by the regime and DFK-affiliated clubs were at that time dissolved or forced into mergers with mainstream clubs. On 1 July 1934, DJK head Adalbert Probst was arrested by the Gestapo before being shot the next day. By early 1935, the DJK and similar organizations were banned outright.

Following World War II, organizations of all types were banned across the country by occupying Allied authorities as part of the process of de-Nazification. New sporting organizations slowly emerged and the DJK was re-formed in 1947 as the "Verband für Sportpflege in katholischer Gemeinschaft" (Catholic Sports Association for Community Care). Former DJK head Prelate Ludwig Wolker played an important role in bringing together the myriad of feuding postwar sports bodies under the national umbrella organization Deutscher Sportbund (German Sports Federation) in 1950. Within the DJK, a fierce factional dispute arose over whether the organization should return to being a separate and purely Catholic organization as it had been before the war, or an ideologically neutral organization that would integrate itself with other national sporting groups. In 1961 the DJK joined the Deutscher Sportbund. The previously separate men's and women's DJK groups were merged in 1970.

Today the organization acts as mediator between the church and sports, and places an emphasis on the role of faith in a sporting context. Based in Düsseldorf, the DJK is a member of the German Olympic Sports Confederation (member with special responsibilities) and the Fédération internationale catholique d'éducation physique et sportive (International Organization of Catholic Sports Associations). The DJK-Sportjugend (DJK-Youth Sport) is an independent youth organization and a member of Deutschen Sport Jugend (German Youth Sport) and the Bund der Deutschen Katholischen Jugend (Federation of German Catholic Youth).

The DJK-Sportsverband includes about 1,200 clubs nationwide and has over 530,000 members, of which almost half are adolescents and young adults (January 2005). The individual member clubs are part of national sports federations and associations for their respective sports. Every two years, the DJK Sportverband awards the DJK Ethics Award for Sport. Volker Monnerjahn has been DJK president since 2004.

== Championships ==
DJK-affiliated clubs participate fully in regional and national sports leagues. Prior to 1933, these clubs were part of the separate DJK-sponsored competitions and occasionally staged national championships. The DJK also fielded its own national football side in the pre-war era.

=== DJK German National Football Champions ===
Year	Champions	Score	Runners-up	Venue
1921	DJK Katernberg	3–2 (a.e.t.)	DJK Ludwigshafen	
1924	DJK Katernberg	4–2	DJK Bürgel Sparta	Frankfurt am Main
1927	Sparta DJK Nürnberg	6–1	DJK TuS 08 Homberg-Hochheide	Köln
1932	Sparta DJK Nürnberg	5–2	DJK Adler Frintrop	Dortmund

=== DJK German National Handball Champions ===
- 1921: DJK Frankfurt-Sachsenhausen
- 1924: DJK Frankfurt-Sachsenhausen
- 1927: DJK Bergfried Graefrath
- 1932: DJK Mülheim-Styrum

=== National Sports Festivals ===
- 1950 Koblenz
- 1953 Schweinfurt
- 1957 Paderborn
- 1961 Nuremberg
- 1965 Düsseldorf 1965
- 1969 Augsburg
- 1973 Münster
- 1977 Mainz
- 1981 Mönchengladbach
- 1985 Ingolstadt
- 1989 Dortmund
- 1993 Bamberg
- 1997 Düsseldorf
- 2001 Koblenz
- 2005 Münster
- 2010 Krefeld
