= Rassenschande =

Nazi word for interracial contacts

- Racial shame
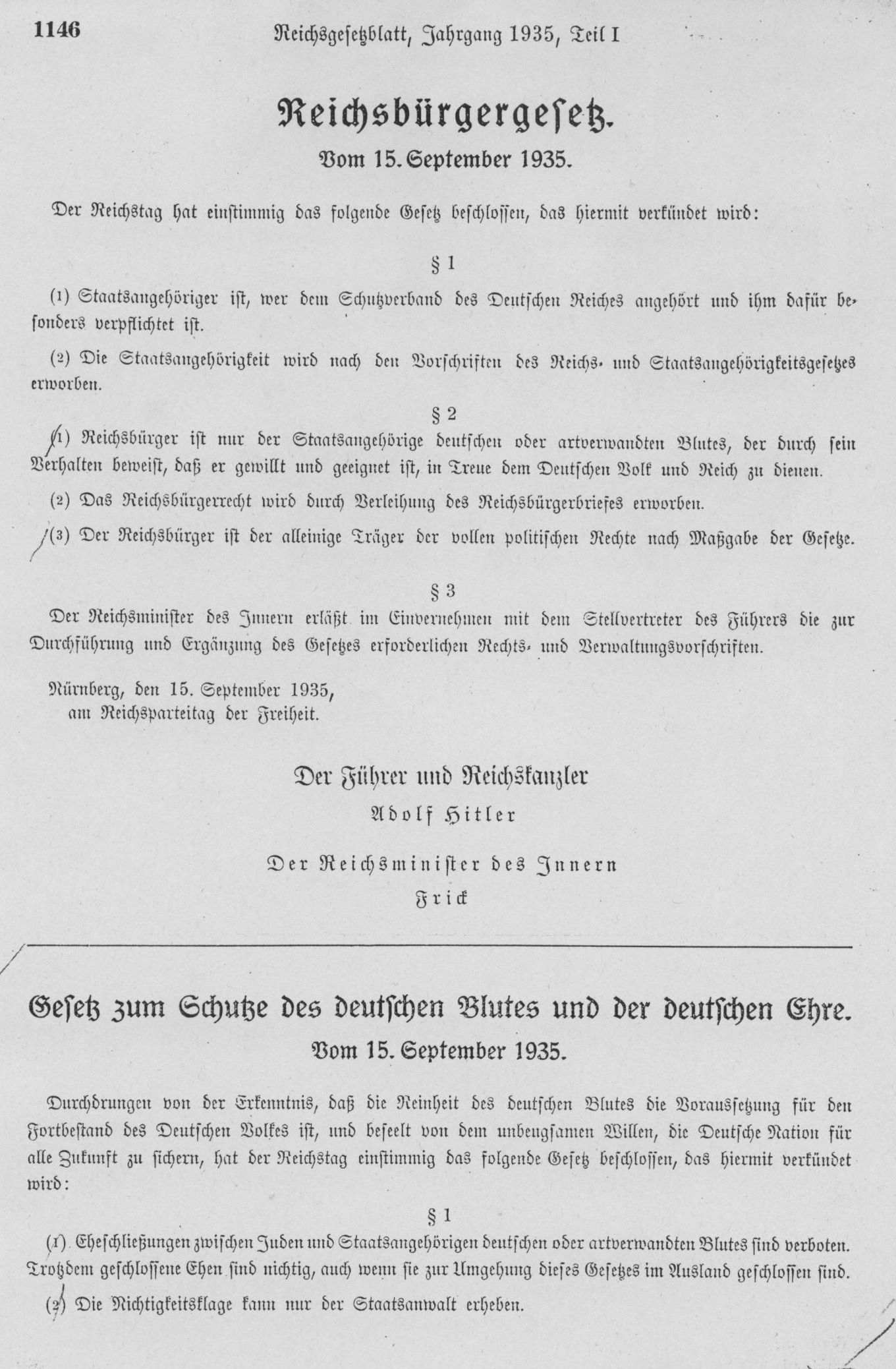
- Reich Citizenship Law (Reichsbürgergesetz) for the Protection of German Blood and German Honor, adopted unanimously by the Reichstag on 15 September 1935

Rassenschande (German: [ˈʁasn̩ˌʃandə], lit. "racial shame") or Blutschande (German: [ˈbluːtˌʃandə] "blood disgrace") was an anti-miscegenation concept in Nazi German racial policy, pertaining to sexual relations between Aryans and non-Aryans. It was put into practice by policies like the Aryan certificate requirement, and later by anti-miscegenation laws such as the Nuremberg Laws, adopted unanimously by the Reichstag on 15 September 1935. Initially, these laws referred predominantly to relations between ethnic Germans (classified, together with most other western Europeans, as "Aryans") and non-Aryans, regardless of citizenship. In the early stages the culprits were targeted informally; later, they were punished systematically and legally.

In the course of the ensuing war years, sexual relations between Reichsdeutschen (ethnic Germans, regardless of place of birth) and millions of foreign Ostarbeitern ("workers from the East") forcibly brought to Germany were also legally forbidden. Concerted efforts were made to foment popular distaste for it. These laws were justified by Nazi racial ideology, which depicted Slavic people as Untermenschen. In addition, there was a practical reason behind the laws: prior to their enactment, Polish and Soviet women and girls working on German farms began having so many unwanted births that hundreds of special homes known as Ausländerkinder-Pflegestätte ("foster homes for foreign children") had to be created. Infants were aborted or killed away from public view.

== Implementation ==
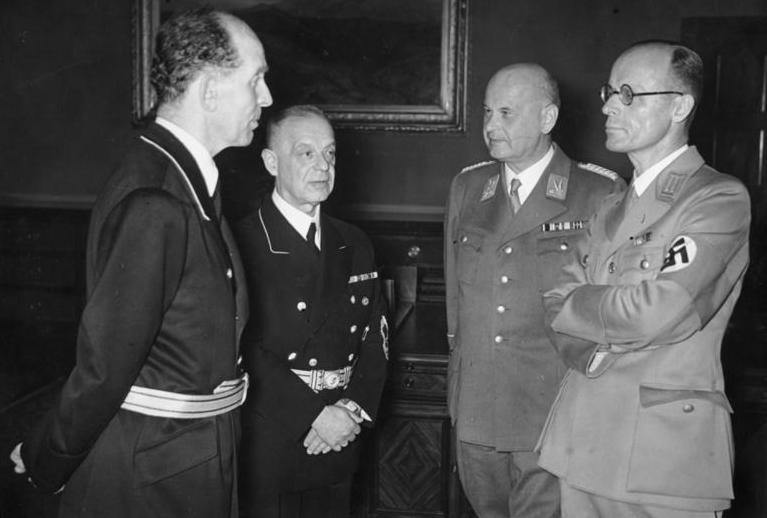
A meeting of the four Nazis who imposed Nazi ideology on the legal system of Germany. From left to right: Roland Freisler, Franz Schlegelberger, Otto Georg Thierack, and Curt Rothenberger.

Prior to the Nazi ascension to power in 1933, Adolf Hitler often blamed moral degradation on Rassenschande, or on "bastardization"—a way to assure his followers of his continuing antisemitism, which had been toned down for popular consumption.

In 1922, Hitler stated, “The Jews seduce our young girls, and thereby infect the people. Every Jew caught with a blond girl, should be . . . (hanged!) . . . we need a court that sentences these Jews to death”. As early as 1924, Julius Streicher argued for the death penalty for Jews found guilty of having sexual relations with Gentiles.

When the Nazis came to power, considerable clashes and infighting had stemmed from conflicting views on what constituted a Jew—anything from full Jewish background to one-sixteenth part Jewish blood were argued for—thus complicating the definition of the offense. Some regarded the number of intermarriages as too small to be harmful; such Nazis as Roland Freisler regarded this as irrelevant owing to the "racial treason" involved. Freisler published a pamphlet that called for banning "mixed-blood" sexual intercourse in 1933, regardless of the "foreign blood" involved, which faced strong public criticism and, at the time, no support from Hitler. His superior, Franz Gürtner, opposed it both for reasons of popular support and such problematic issues as people who did not know they had Jewish blood, and that allegations of Jewish blood (true or false) could be used for blackmail.

Local officials, however, were already requiring betrothed couples to prove they were worthy to marry by presenting proof of Aryan ancestry. In 1934, Wilhelm Frick warned local officials about banning such marriages on their own, but in 1935, authorized them to delay applications by mixed couples. Even before the Nuremberg Laws were passed, the SS regularly arrested those accused of racial defilement and paraded them through the streets with placards around their necks detailing their crime. Stormtroopers acted with overt hostility toward mixed couples. One girl was paraded through the streets, with her hair shaved and a placard declaring, "I have given myself to a Jew." Placards were widely used to humiliate. Das Schwarze Korps, in its April 1935 issue, called for laws against it as preferable to the extra-legal violence being indulged in. It reported a story that a Jew had enticed a 17-year-old employee into nude midnight bathing—the girl being saved from suicide only by the intervention of an SS patrol, and a mob of thousands besieged the Jew's house until the police took him into protective custody. Reichsführer-SS Heinrich Himmler was the main person behind the persecution of those involved with accusations of Rassenschande.

== Nuremberg Laws ==
In Nazi Germany, after the Nuremberg Laws were passed in 1935, sexual relations and marriages between Aryans and non-Aryans were prohibited. (Note: The term sexual intercourse was extended far beyond the defined concept of the term. Simply looking at someone in a sexual manner was enough to be charged with race defilement.) Although the laws were primarily against Jews at first, they were later extended to the Romani, Blacks, and their offspring. Persons accused of racial defilement were publicly humiliated by being paraded through the streets with placards around their necks proclaiming their crime. Those convicted were sentenced to a period of time in a concentration camp. As the laws themselves did not permit the death penalty for those charged with racial defilement, the jurisdiction bypassed this and summoned special courts to allow the death penalty for such cases.

The extent of the law meant that the police were insufficient to the task of detecting infractions; more than three-fifths of all Gestapo cases were prompted by denunciations. Germans who had intermarried with Jews and other non-Aryans prior to the Nuremberg Laws did not have their unions nullified, but were targeted and encouraged to divorce their existing partners.

The rape of Jewish women was also forbidden during World War II, but the law did little or nothing to either prevent or stop it because the soldiers who committed rape frequently killed the women after they raped them, to ensure their silence. In the only case where German soldiers were prosecuted for rape during the military campaign in Poland—the case of mass rape committed by three soldiers against the Jewish Kaufmann family in Busko-Zdrój—the German judge sentenced the guilty for Rassenschande rather than rape.

== Foreign workers ==
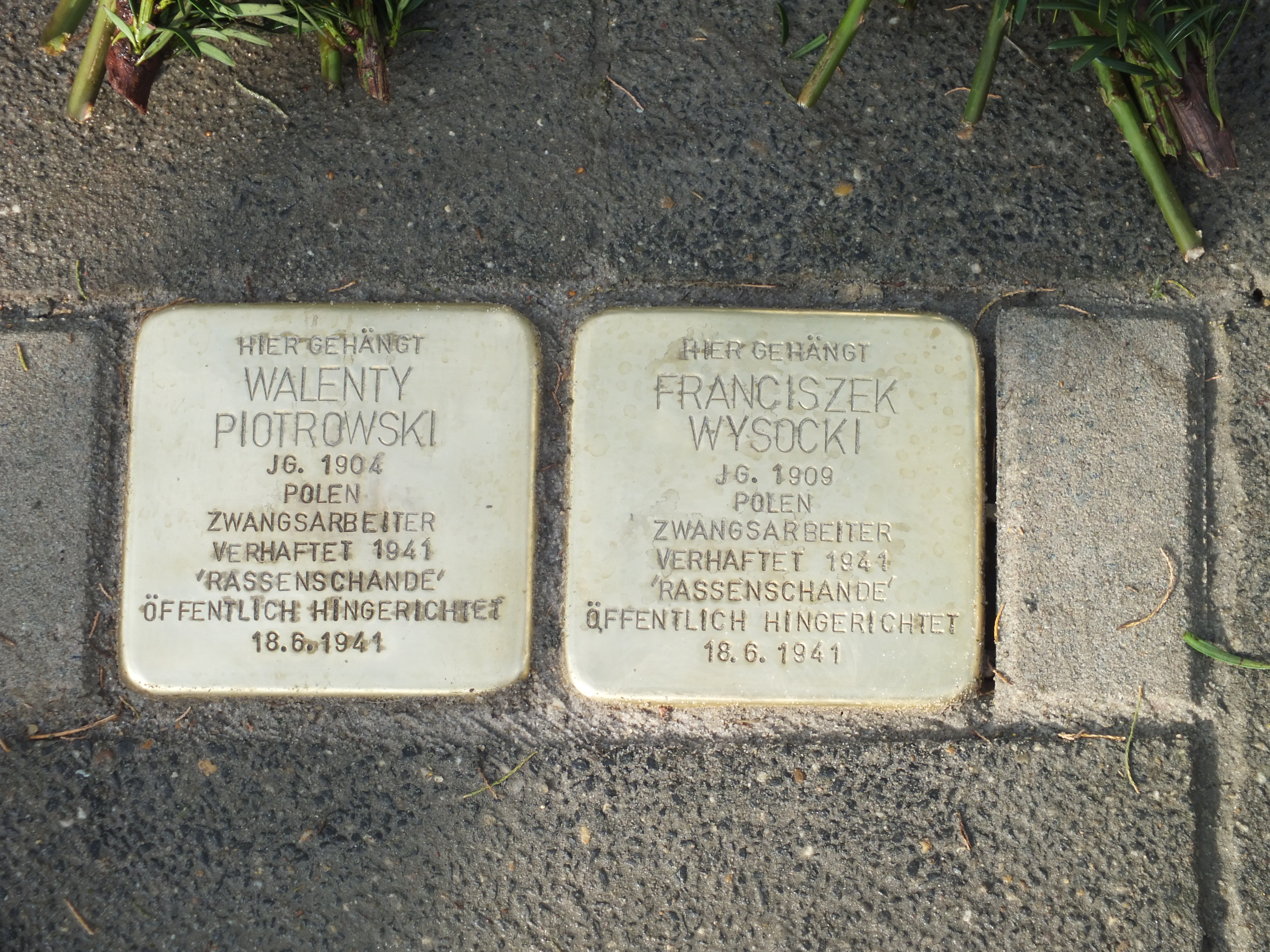
Stolperstein for Walenty Piotrowski and Franciszek Wysocki, Polish forced laborers hanged for Rassenschande on 18 June 1941

After the invasion of Poland in 1939, Nazi reports of sexual relations between Polish women and German soldiers brought about a directive issued for the press to promulgate that the links between Poles and Germans brought about a decline in German blood, and that any connection with people of Polish extraction was dangerous. The press was to describe Poles as on the same level as Jews and Gypsies in order to discourage association. On 8 March 1940, the Nazi German government issued the Polish decrees with regard to the Polish forced laborer workers in Germany, stating that any Pole "who has sexual relations with a German man or woman, or approaches them in any other improper manner, will be punished by death."

After the war in the East began, the race defilement law was technically extended to include all foreigners (non-Germans). Himmler issued a decree on 7 December 1942 which stated that any "unauthorized sexual intercourse" would result in the death penalty. The Gestapo persecuted sexual relations between Germans and the peoples of Eastern Europe on the grounds of the "risk for the racial integrity of the German nation". A further decree was issued that called for applying the death penalty not only to slave laborer persons in the East who had sexual relations with Germans, but also to slave laborers of Western origin, such as French, Belgian or British offenders.

During the war, any German woman who had sexual relations with foreign workers was publicly humiliated by being marched through the streets with her head shaven and a placard around her neck detailing her crime.

Germans were explicitly forbidden from having any sexual relations with Poles:

Maintain the purity of German blood! That applies to both men and women! Just as it is considered the greatest disgrace to become involved with a Jew, any German engaging in intimate relations with a Polish male or female is guilty of sinful behavior. Despise the bestial urges of this race! Be racially conscious and protect your children. Otherwise you will forfeit your greatest asset: your honor!

Robert Gellately in his book The Gestapo and German Society: Enforcing Racial Policy, 1933-1945 mentions cases where German women who violated the Nazi racial laws were punished.

In September 1940, Dora von Calbitz, who was found guilty of having sexual relations with a Pole, had her head shaved and was placed in the pillory of her town of Oschatz near Leipzig, with a placard that proclaimed: "I have been a dishonourable German woman in that I sought and had relations with Poles. By doing that I excluded myself from the community of the people."

In March 1941, a married German woman who had an affair with a French prisoner of war had her head shaved and was marched through the town of Bramberg in Lower Franconia carrying a sign which said, "I have sullied the honour of the German woman."

The policy of prohibiting sexual relations between Germans and foreign workers was pursued to the extent that a case emerged of two German girls, one (aged 16) who was raped and the other (aged 17) who was sexually assaulted, had their heads shaved and were paraded through the streets with placards around their neck stating they were "without honor". The event was met with complete disapproval but was pursued to put fear into the German public in order to avoid the Poles. From 1940 onwards, Poles were commonly hanged in public without trial for having sexual intercourse with German women.

During the war, effort was made by Nazi propaganda to motivate Germans to propagate Volkstum ("racial consciousness"). Pamphlets were issued encouraging German women to prevent sexual relations with foreign workers brought to Germany and to view them as a danger to their "blood" (i.e. racial purity). Particularly with the Ostarbeiters, all sexual relations, even those that did not result in pregnancy, were severely punished. To prevent violations of German racial laws, orders explicitly provided that the workers were to be recruited in equal numbers of men and women, so brothels would not be needed. The program to import nannies from Eastern Europe, including Poland and Ukraine, would result in their working with German children, and quite possibly sexually exploited; therefore, such women had to be suitable for Germanisation.

== Propaganda ==
Inculcating acceptance of this distinction, and the need for racial hygiene, was widely spread in Nazi propaganda. Nazi speakers were enjoined that many Germans did not "recognize what is at stake", citing a newspaper title that called the decision to punish sexual relations between Germans and Jews "A Strange Decision". Even foreign propaganda urged the importance of preventing it with penalties.

Der Stürmer was preoccupied with such cases, with nearly every issue alleging sexual crimes, often in graphic detail, about Jews. After the Nuremberg Laws were propagated, Streicher in four of the first eight articles in 1935 of the Der Stürmer demanded for the death penalty in cases of race defilement. It habitually referred to voluntary relationships as "rape" and "molestation". Fips portrayed, for instance, a despondent mother smoking while neglecting her child in a lonely rooming house, with a picture of her Jewish seducer on the floor, with the caption: "Everything in her has died. She was ruined by a Jew."

Neues Volk was a monthly publication of the NSDAP Office of Racial Policy which answered questions about acceptable race relations and included other material promoting the excellence of the Aryan race. Even an infertile German woman could not marry a Jew because "it offends the honor of the German people" and she should break off the relationship because she was in danger of violating the law. Marriage to a Chinese man, even though the woman was pregnant, was likewise forbidden, and the office had seen to it that the man was deported. A Dutch woman raised questions of not only Jewish blood but non-white blood from the colonies, but if they were answered, she would be acceptable. An article also enjoined that while foreign workers were welcome, all sexual relations were out of the question.

Film was also used. In Frisians in Peril, a Frisian character objects to a half-Russian, half-Frisian girl having an affair with a Russian, because Frisian blood outweighs Russian; her murder for this is presented as in accordance with ancient Germanic custom for "race pollution". In Die goldene Stadt, a young, innocent country girl and Sudeten German allows a Czech to seduce her. This racial pollution is one reason why she commits suicide, in a deliberate change insisted on by the Propaganda Ministry, since the disgraced daughter should suffer rather than the guiltless father, who committed suicide in the source. In Jud Süß, the title Jew relentlessly pursues a pure Aryan maid; after he succeeds by having her husband arrested and tortured, and offering to free him for her compliance, she drowns herself. In Die Reise nach Tilsit, the Polish seductress persuades the German husband to murder his virtuous German wife to run off with her, but the husband fails and in the end, contrite, returns to his wife.

Repeated efforts were made to propagate Volkstum, racial consciousness, to prevent sexual relations between Germans and foreign workers. Pamphlets enjoined all German women to avoid sexual intercourse with all foreign workers brought to Germany, citing them as a danger to their blood.

=== In schools ===
Keep your blood pure,
It is not yours alone,
It comes from far away,
It flows into the distance
Laden with thousands of ancestors,
And it holds the entire future!
It is your eternal life.

Implementation began in schools so rapidly that book production could not keep up; the ministry held that no student should graduate "unless he has perceived that the future of a Volk depends on race and inheritance and understood the obligation this places on him", and so urged for teacher courses using mimeographed materials and cheaply produced books. Students were given racist poems to memorize (right).

By the mid-1930s, more substantial materials were produced, including many pamphlets such as Can You Think Racially?. The German National Catechism, a pamphlet widely used in schools, included among its questions:

What is racial defilement? Forgetting our spirit and our blood. A careless disregard of our nature and a contempt for our blood. No German man may take a Jewish woman as his wife, and no German girl may marry a Jew. Those who do that exclude themselves from the community of the German people. — German National Catechism

"The Jewish Question in Education", a pamphlet for teachers, lamented that many girls and women had been ruined by Jews because no one had warned them of the perils, "no one introduced them to the god-given secrets and laws of blood and race." Such unions could produce children of mixed blood ("a lamentable creature, tossed back and forth by the blood of his two races"), and even when they did not, "the curse also sticks to the defiled mother, never leaving her for the rest of her life. Racial defilement is racial death. Racial defilement is bloodless murder. A woman defiled by the Jew can never rid her body of the foreign poison she has absorbed. She is lost to her people." The League of German Girls was particularly regarded as instructing girls to avoid racial defilement. The pamphlet further claimed that Jews avoided such racial mixing, but preached to other nations to weaken them.

== Sentences ==
According to an article in Der Spiegel, between 1936 and 1943, the Nazis accused 1,580 persons (in Hamburg alone) of race defilement with 429 of them being convicted.

Punishment for race defilement for men was penal labor or prison. Women were left out of the penal legislation (some said, because of the ideology that presented them as seduced, rather than active perpetrators; some said simply because their witness was needed and a witness need not give evidence against herself). They could however be tried for perjury or similar offenses if they tried to protect their (alleged or actual) lover, or sent to a concentration camp (which was not part of the justice system, but inflicted by the Gestapo without any legal control). When Himmler asked Hitler what the punishment of women found guilty of race defilement should be, Hitler said, "having her hair shorn and being sent to a concentration camp". Julius Streicher and others continued to claim the death penalty, which in some cases actually was given, using laws for aggravated punishment if using war-time brownout to commit the "offense" (on which pretext Leo Katzenberger e. g. was killed), if being a "dangerous habitual criminal", and the like. For the justification of death sentences, ordinances with broad elements of fact such as the "Verordnung gegen Volksschädlinge", which came into force on 7 September 1939, were also used.

== See also ==
- Anti-miscegenation laws
- Discrimination based on skin color
- Honorary Aryan
- Mischling, a pejorative term for people who were of mixed Aryan and non-Aryan ancestry.
- Polish decrees by Nazi Germany for the workers (Zivilarbeiter) who were used as slave laborers.
- Race traitor
- Racial hygiene, state-sanctioned policies which were pursued during the early 20th century.
- Nazi propaganda, propaganda which was produced and disseminated in Nazi Germany and German-occupied Europe by the Nazi Party (1933–1945).
- Nazi racial theories
- Racial policy of Nazi Germany
