= Preußische Hauptkadettenanstalt =

Prussian Army military academy

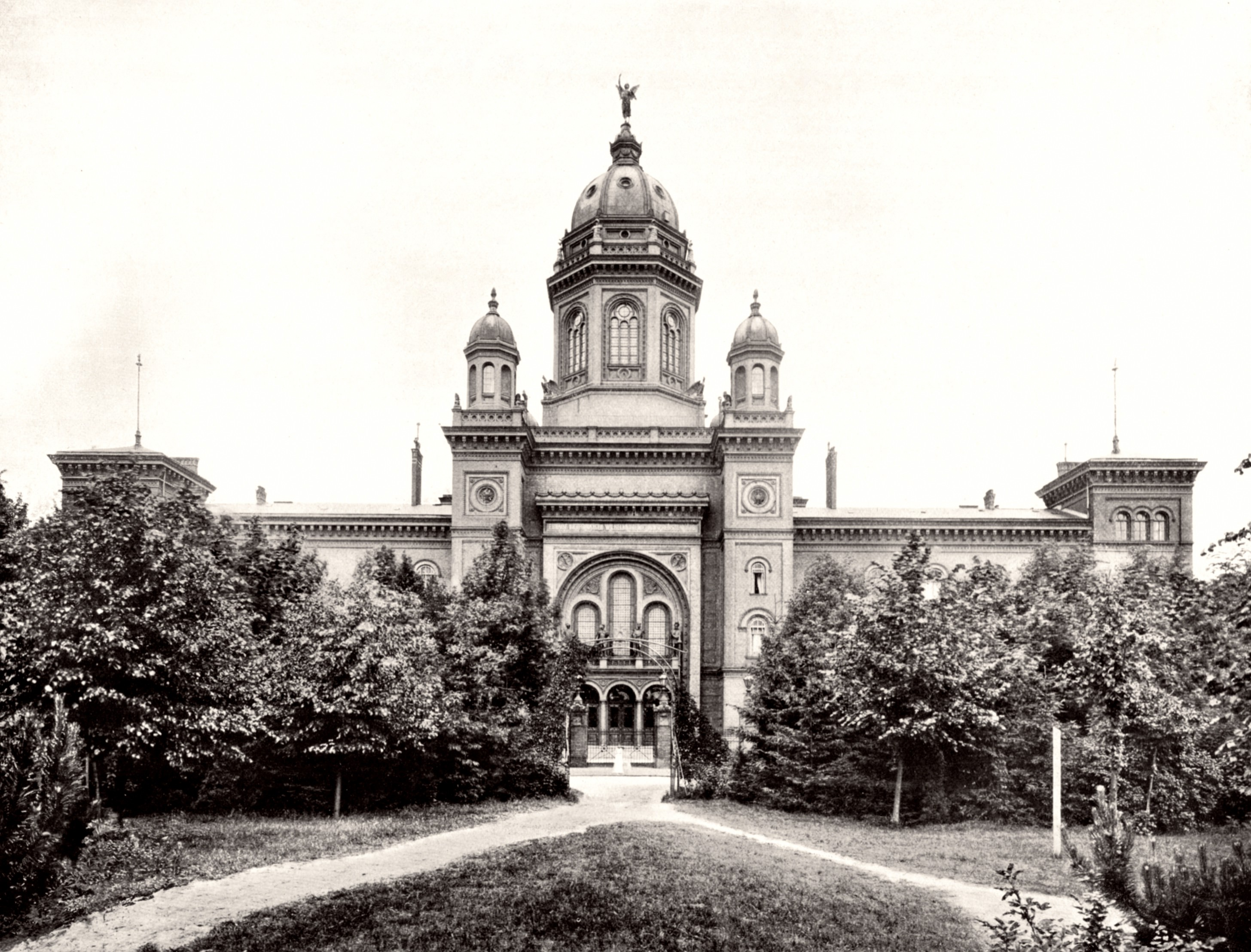
Main entrance and administration building in 1900

The Preußische Hauptkadettenanstalt ("Prussian Principal Academy for Cadets") in Groß-Lichterfelde near Berlin, was the military academy where boys in grades 10 through 13 were prepared for entry into the officer corps of the German Imperial Army from 1882 to 1919. The building complex housed the SS Division Leibstandarte from 1933 to 1945, and parts of U.S. Berlin Brigade from 1945 to 1994.

== Background ==
The Berlin Cadet Corps of the Prussian Army was housed from 1717 to 1777 in the so-called Old Cadet House on the grounds of the former Hetzgarten (a former hunting ground) in Berlin-Mitte (located in Bastion 9 of the fortifications). The older building there was demolished in 1777 and replaced by a more impressive new Cadet House on the same site.

In 1866, Johann Anton Wilhelm Carstenn purchased the Lichterfelde and Giesensdorf estates to establish the villa colonies of Lichterfelde-West and Lichterfelde-East near Berlin. He subdivided the land, had avenues and squares laid out, and stipulated villa construction. To boost the initially slow sales, he donated approximately 21 hectares of land in Lichterfelde-West to the Prussian state in 1871 for the construction of a new cadet academy. Carstenn relied on the improved image resulting from the relocation of the highly regarded institution to Lichterfelde, as well as the increased demand for land from the officers, who in Prussia still predominantly came from aristocratic families after the unification of Germany in 1871. With the donation agreement, he committed himself to developing the barracks grounds and establishing a transport connection. To this end, Siemens & Halske opened the world's first electrically operated tramway in 1881 from Lichterfelde station (later Groß-Lichterfelde B.H., today Lichterfelde Ost) on the Berlin–Halle railway line (B.H.), initially only for transporting materials to the construction site of the main cadet academy. The Lichterfelde–cadet academy tramway was extended in 1890 to Groß-Lichterfelde B.M. station (today Lichterfelde West) on the Berlin–Magdeburg railway line (B.M.).

Carstenn's concept was so successful that the character of the villa district of Lichterfelde is still dominated today by the homes of the Prussian-conservative upper class originally attracted by the cadet academy. He himself lost his considerable fortune due to the financial obligations associated with the construction of the academy and, from 1887 onward, lived on an annual pension of 43,000 marks (equivalent to approximately €385,000 in today's currency), along with a one-time payment of 180,000 marks to compensate for his financial ruin.

== History ==
=== Preußische Hauptkadettenanstalt, 1873–1920 ===
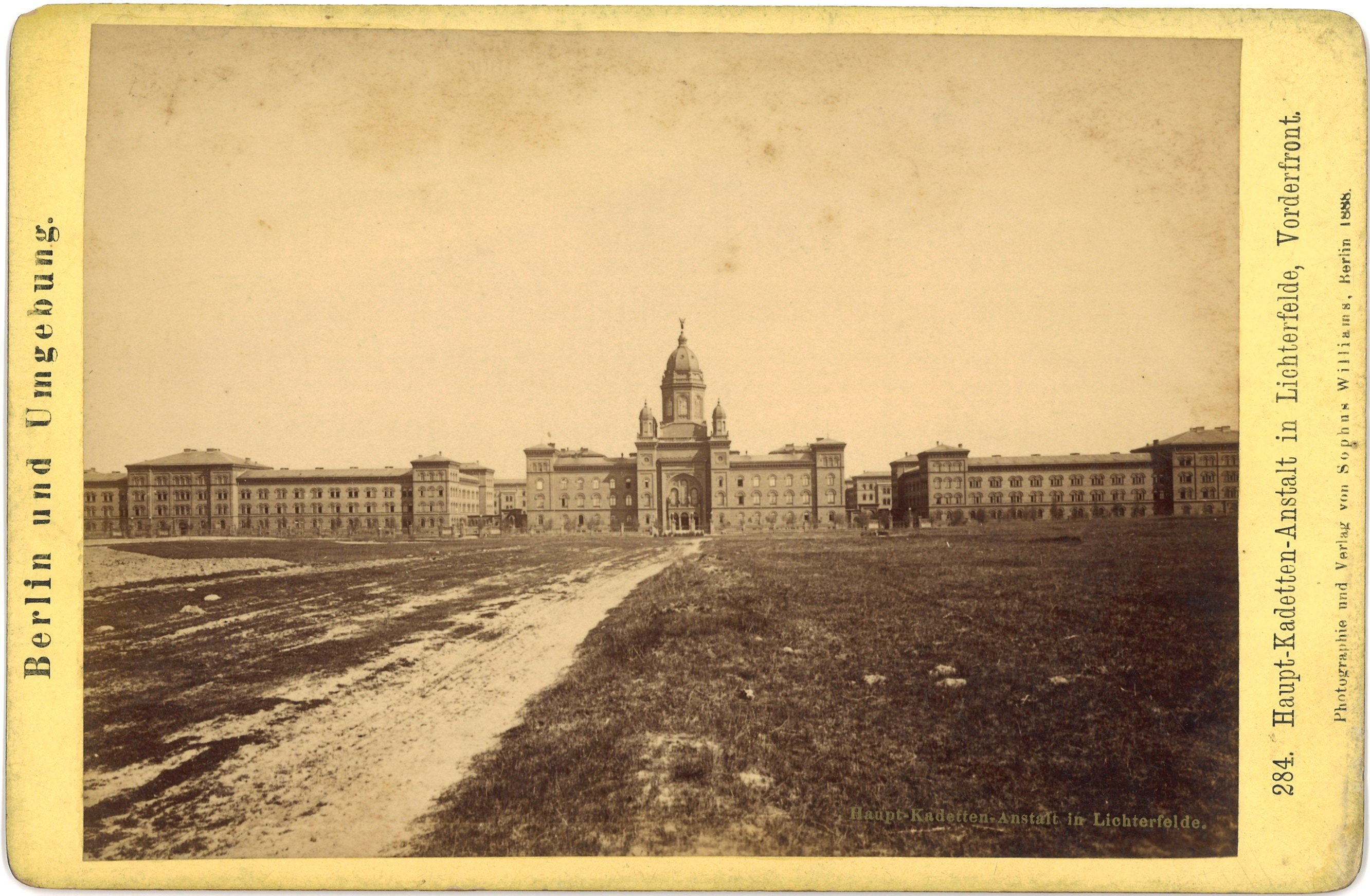
1888 photograph from the north

On 1 September 1873, in the presence of Kaiser Wilhelm I, the foundation stone for the new main cadet academy was laid on what was then Zehlendorfer Straße (renamed Finckensteinallee in June 1933). By 1878, buildings designed by August Ferdinand Fleischinger and Gustav Voigtel had been erected, including teaching and administrative buildings, two churches (one of which was soon nicknamed "Cadet Cathedral"), the Field Marshal's Hall, a dining hall, stables, a gymnasium, a military hospital, and a large number of staff apartments.

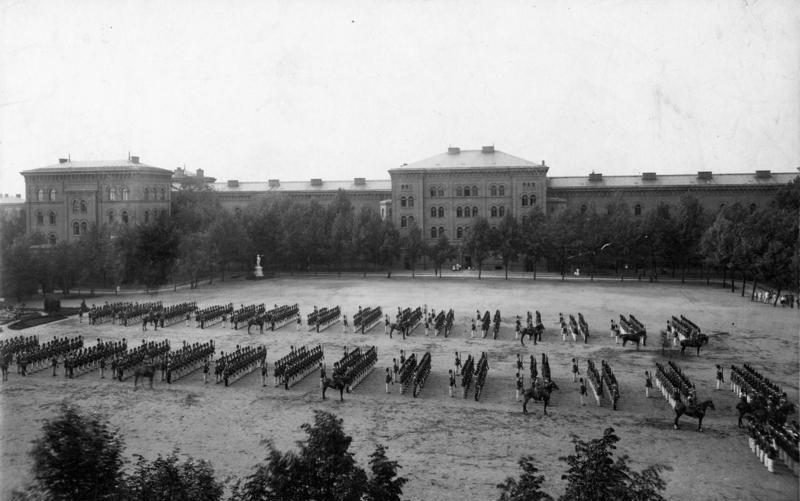
Cadets preparing for a parade, 1906

In 1878, the cadet academy moved from its cramped quarters in the city to the new buildings in Lichterfelde-West. It remained the most important institution of its kind in the German Empire until its dissolution under the Treaty of Versailles in 1920. After a closing formation in March 2020, the remaining cadets marched from the Academy to Schloßplatz (Berlin) and handed the keys to the Academy to the new German government.

==== Graduates (excerpt) ====
- Hans Kahle (1899–1947), World War I veteran turned Communist Party of Germany member, NKVD spymaster, senior commander in Spanish Republican Army's International Brigades during the Spanish Civil War, and politician in the German Democratic Republic.
- Erich Ludendorff {1865–1937), directed Germany's World War I military strategy and war effort from 1916–1918
- Paul Tafel (1872–1953), early member of the German Workers' Party (the precursor of the NSDAP), mentor of its founder Anton Drexler.
- Erwin von Witzleben (1881–1944), commander of Germany's forces in western Europe in WW II, one of the leaders of the failed plot to assassinate Hitler, executed in 1944 after a show trial
- Manfred von Richthofen (1892–1918), cadet from 1909–1911. Legendary World War I flying ace nicknamed "The Red Baron".
- Hermann Göring (1893–1946), cadet from 1909–1913. Powerful politician during the Third Reich, convicted war criminal who committed suicide in 1946 to avoid execution by hanging
- Yinchang (1859–1929 or 1934), Chinese military official, ambassador to Germany, and educational reformer in the Qing dynasty and the Republic of China.

=== Use as a civilian school, 1920–1933 ===
In 1920, the complex was turned into a Staatliche Bildungsanstalt (state education academy), consisting of a Realgymnasium (a secondary school whose final exam, if passed successfully, qualified students to enter university), a middle school, and a residential school. The change encountered resistance from its mostly monarchist teachers and militarist students who resisted the abolishment of the companies and continued drills and formations on their own. The student body declined considerably after 1922.

=== Nazi era, 1933–1945 ===
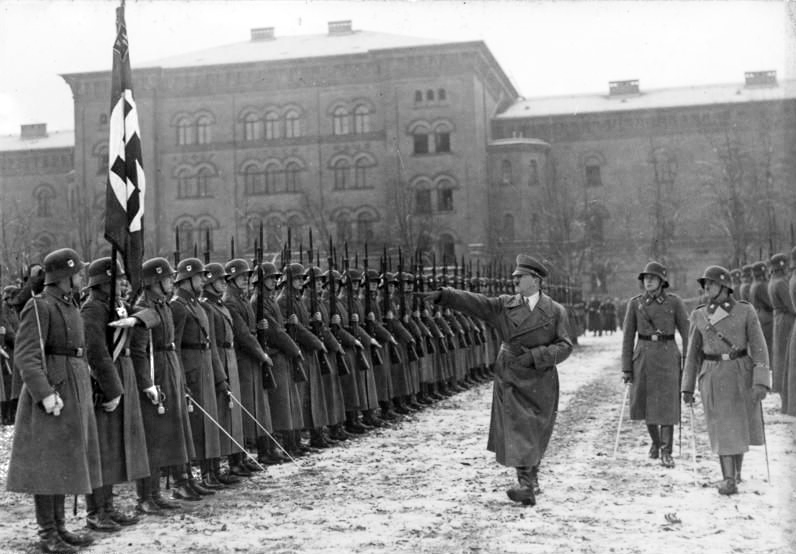
December 1935 parade for Adolf Hitler

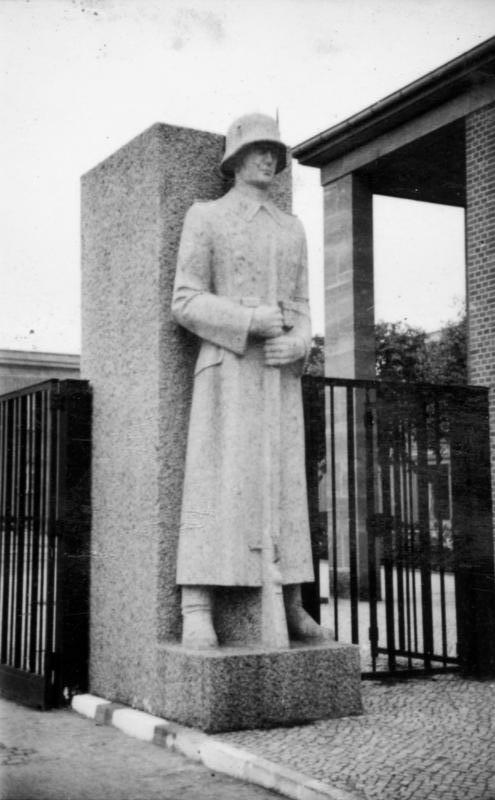
One of two statues of SS soldiers at the gate to the compound. The statues were encased in concrete when the US Army took over.

In 1933, the compound was returned to military use by two paramilitary groups, "SS-Sonderkommando Berlin" (SS special forces Berlin), which was renamed Leibstandarte Adolf Hitler in November 1933, and the militarized "Landespolizeigruppe Wecke z. b. V." (Special Duties State Police Group Wecke) which was used for attacking opponents of the Nazi regime and was reorganized and renamed "Landespolizeigruppe General Göring" (State Police Group General Göring) in early 1934. As of December 1934, Leibstandarte Adolf Hitler was the sole user of the compound.

==== June/July 1934 predetermined trials and executions ====
During the extrajudicial purge from June 30 to July 2, 1934, high-ranking and other members of the Nazi paramilitary organization SA and other people believed to be potential rivals of the party hierarchy from all over Germany were brought to the SS barracks and sentenced to death in predetermined one-minute trials. They were then locked up in the coal cellar of the hospital building, then brought upstairs one by one into the hospital's yard and, accompanied by a drum roll, shot by an SS firing squad. When the purge was called off on July 3, the men still awaiting execution were released.

=== Andrews Barracks, 1945–1994 ===
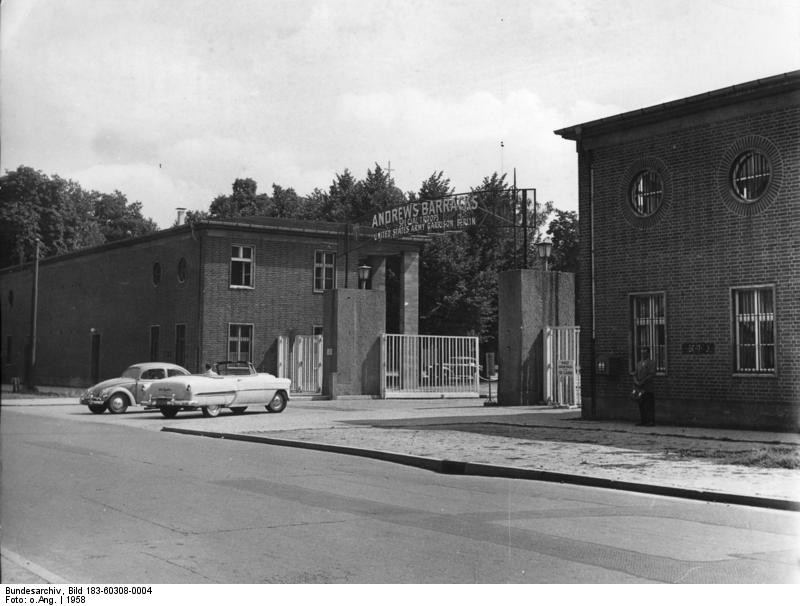
Andrews Barracks gate, 1958
