= Stadelheim Prison =

Prison in Munich, Germany

Coordinates: 48°05′59″N 11°35′31″E

Stadelheim Prison (German: Justizvollzugsanstalt München), in Munich's Giesing district, is one of the largest prisons in Germany.

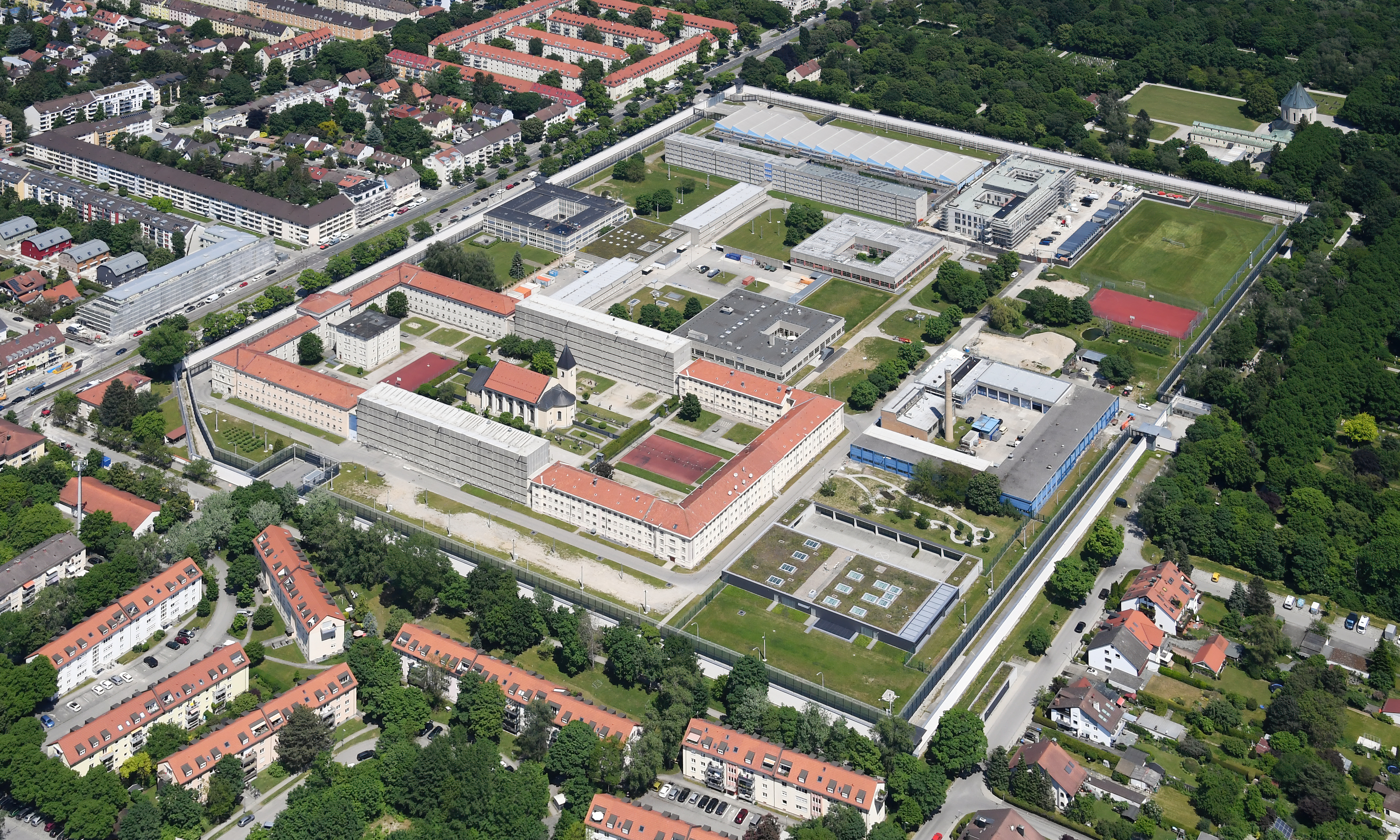
Stadelheim Prison

Founded in 1894, it was the site of many executions, particularly by guillotine during the Nazi period.

== Notable inmates ==
- Ludwig Thoma, served a six-week prison sentence in 1906 for insulting the morality associations.
- Kurt Eisner, after the January strike, imprisoned from summer until 14 October 1918.
- Anton Graf von Arco auf Valley, the assassin of Kurt Eisner, Minister President of Bavaria. He served his sentence in cell 70, and in 1924 was evicted from his cell to make way for Adolf Hitler.
- Gustav Landauer, killed on 2 May 1919.
- Eugen Leviné, killed on 5 July 1919.
- Ernst Toller, imprisoned, 1919–1924.
- Adolf Hitler, imprisoned for a month in 1922 for assaulting Otto Ballerstedt.
- Ernst Röhm imprisoned before his execution during the Night of the Long Knives. The SA-Stabschef (Chief of Staff), he was shot on 1 July 1934 in cell 70.
- Peter von Heydebreck, an SA-Gruppenführer, imprisoned and killed by the SS during the Röhm purge on 30 June 1934.
- Wilhelm Schmid, an SA-Gruppenführer, imprisoned and killed by the SS during the Röhm purge on 30 June 1934.
- August Schneidhuber, an SA-Obergruppenführer and Police President of Munich, imprisoned and killed by the SS during the Röhm purge on 30 June 1934.
- Christl-Marie Schultes, first female Bavarian aviator, imprisoned 1944–1945.
- Leo Katzenberger, guillotined on 2 June 1942 for violating the Nazi Rassenschutzgesetz, or Racial Protection Law. The judge at the infamous Katzenberger Trial, Oswald Rothaug, condemned him despite a lack of evidence.
- Hans Scholl, member of the White Rose resistance movement, executed on 22 February 1943.
- Sophie Scholl, member of the White Rose resistance movement. executed 22 February 1943.
- Adele Stürzl, Austrian resistance fighter, executed on 30 june 1944.
- Christoph Probst, member of the White Rose, executed on 22 February 1943.
- Josefine Brunner, Austrian socialist, member of resistance against the Nazi regime
- Alexander Schmorell, member of the White Rose and saint of the Eastern Orthodox church, executed on 13 July 1943.
- Kurt Huber, member of the White Rose, executed on 13 July 1943.
- Willi Graf, member of the White Rose, executed on 12 October 1943.
- Friedrich Ritter von Lama, Catholic journalist, listening in on Vatican Radio. Murdered in February 1944.
- Hans Conrad Leipelt, member of the White Rose, executed on 19 January 1945.
- Ingrid Schubert, member of the Red Army Faction, found hanged in her cell on 13 November 1977.
- Dieter Zlof, the kidnapper of Richard Oetker, was here (circa 1977) until his transfer to Straubing.
- Konstantin Wecker, musician, 1995 pre-trial detention for cocaine use.
- Karl-Heinz Wildmoser Sr., former president of the TSV 1860 Munich football team. Imprisoned circa 2002.
- MOK, rapper, imprisoned 2003–04.
- Oliver Shanti, musician, imprisoned 2008, died in 2016.
- John Demjanjuk, suspected war criminal. Imprisoned 2009.
- Gerhard Gribkowsky, chief risk officer of Munich-based bank BayernLB, the former chairman of SLEC. Imprisoned 2010.
- Breno Borges, association football player and former Bayern Munich member. Imprisoned 2012.
- Beate Zschäpe, accused member of National Socialist Underground (NSU), sentenced to life in prison without parole.

== Statistics about the prison ==
- Size: 14 hectares
- Capacity of prison: ca. 1,500 prisoners (possible maximum 2,100)
- Highest number of prisoners: 9 November 1993 with 1,969 prisoners
- Executions 1895 to 1927: 14 (including Gustav Landauer and Eugen Levine)
- Executions 1933 to 1945: at least 1,035 (including Ernst Röhm and the members of the White Rose resistance movement, i.e. Sophie Scholl, Hans Scholl and Christoph Probst; Alex Schmorell, Willi Graf and Prof. Kurt Huber. Also Hans Conrad Leipelt from the White Rose in Hamburg who was beheaded in January 1945 for reproducing and distributing the sixth and final White Rose leaflet which was written by Kurt Huber)
