= Schmid =

Schmid (German pronunciation: [ʃmɪt]) is a German surname that is a cognate of "Smith", an occupational surname for a blacksmith. The spelling is more common in Switzerland than Schmidt or Schmitt. Notable people with the surname include:

- Aglaja Schmid (1926–2003), Austrian stage and film actress
- Akira Schmid (born 2000), Swiss ice hockey player
- Al Schmid (1920–1982), American marine
- Alex P. Schmid (born 1943), Dutch scientist on terror
- Alexander Schmid (born 1994), German alpine skier
- Andi Schmid, Austrian luger and skeleton racer
- Andre Schmid (disambiguation), multiple people
- Andy Schmid (born 1983), Swiss handballer
- Anka Schmid (born 1961), Swiss film director, screenwriter and video artist
- Anna Katharina Schmid (born 1989), Swiss pole vaulter
- Anne-Françoise Schmid (born 1949), Swiss-born French philosopher
- Anthony Schmid (born 1999), Austrian football player
- Anton Schmid (politician) (1819–1893), German politician in the Landtag of Bavaria
- Anton Schmid (Righteous Among the Nations) (1900–1942), Austrian Nazi army officer who was executed by the Nazis for aiding the resistance movement
- Anton Schmid (writer) (1787–1857), Austrian writer
- August Schmid-Lindner (1870–1959), German pianist, composer and music
- Barbara Schmid-Federer (born 1965), Swiss politician
- Belinda Schmid (born 1981), Swiss synchronized swimmer
- Benedikt Schmid (born 1990), German footballer
- Bernhard Schmid (1788–1857), German missionary and botanist
- Carl Friedrich Schmid (1840–1897), Baltic German chess player
- Carlo Schmid (disambiguation), multiple people
- Charles Schmid (1942–1975), American serial killer
- Christian Friedrich Schmid (1794–1852), German Lutheran theologian
- Christoph Schmid (disambiguation), multiple people
- Christopher Schmid (born 1976), German musician
- Christopher H. Schmid, biostatistician
- Clemens Schmid (born 1990), Austrian racing driver
- Constantin Schmid (born 1999), German ski jumper
- Cordelia Schmid (born 1967), German computer vision researcher
- Daniel Schmid (disambiguation), multiple people
- Dennis Schmid (born 1969), American professional tennis player
- Dominik Schmid (disambiguation), multiple people
- Eduard Schmid (1861–1933), Lord Mayor of Munich
- Edy Schmid (1911–2000), Swiss field handball player
- Elisabeth Schmid (1912–1994), German archaeologist
- Elmar Schmid, Swiss clarinetist
- Engelbert Schmid, German musician
- Erich Schmid (disambiguation), multiple people
- Ernst Fritz Schmid (1904–1960), German musicologist and scholar
- Flavio Schmid (born 1980), Swiss soccer player
- Franz Schmid (disambiguation), multiple people
- Friederike Schmid, German theoretical condensed-matter physicist and polymer scientist
- Fritz Schmid (disambiguation), multiple people
- Greti Schmid (born 1954), Austrian politician
- Günter Schmid (1932–2005), German Formula One team owner
- Hans Schmid (disambiguation), multiple people
- Harald Schmid (born 1957), German athlete
- Heidi Schmid (born 1938), German fencer
- Heinrich Schmid (1921–1999), Swiss linguist
- Heinrich Kaspar Schmid (1874–1953), German composer
- Helga Schmid (born 1960), German diplomat
- Hellmut Schmid (1915–1998), Swiss geodetic scientist
- Helmut Schmid (1925–1992), German actor
- Herbert Schmid (1914–1975), German pilot who defected to Scotland
- Heribert Schmid (born 1941), Swiss ski jumper
- Hermann Schmid (disambiguation), multiple people
- Horst Schmid (1933–2026), German-born Canadian politician and businessman
- Iwan Schmid (1947–2009), Swiss cyclist
- Jacob Schmid (born 1994), Australian track sprint cyclist
- Jakob Schmid (1886–1964), German janitor
- Jan Schmid (born 1983), Norwegian Nordic combined skier
- Jeanette Schmid (1924–2005), German-Czech performer
- Jeffrey Schmid, American politician
- Joachim Schmid (born 1955), German artist
- Jochen Schmid (born 1963), German Grand Prix motorcycle road racer
- Johann Schmid (1911–1941), Austrian-born Luftwaffe military aviator
- John Schmid (born 1949), American country and folk singer
- Jonathan Schmid (born 1990), French footballer
- Josef Schmid (disambiguation), multiple people
- Julia Schmid (born 1988), Austrian slalom canoeist
- Julian Schmid (disambiguation), multiple people
- Juliane Schmid (born 2004), German footballer
- Jürgen Schmid (born 1982), German footballer
- Kaia Schmid (born 2003), American cyclist
- Karl Schmid (disambiguation), multiple people
- Katharina Schmid (born 1996), German ski jumper
- Kendra Schmid, American statistician and academic administrator
- Konrad Schmid (disambiguation), multiple people
- Kristian Schmid (born 1974), Australian actor
- Kristina Schmid, Swedish photographer
- Kurt Schmid (1911–2000), Swiss rower
- Kyle Schmid (born 1984), Canadian actor
- Lothar Schmid (1928–2013), German chess grandmaster
- Lucas Schmid (born 2004), English rugby union footballer
- Lucile Schmid (born 1962), French politician
- Ludwig Schmid (disambiguation), multiple people
- Maja Schmid (born 1967), Swiss freestyle skier
- Manuel Schmid (disambiguation), multiple people
- Martin Schmid (1694–1772), Swiss Jesuit, missionary, musician and architect
- Máté Schmid (born 1996), Hungarian footballer
- Mathias Schmid (1835–1923), Austrian painter
- Matthias Schmid (born 1980), Austrian sailor
- Matti Schmid (born 1997), German professional golfer
- Mauro Schmid (born 1999), Swiss cyclist
- Max Schmid (died 1964), Swiss rower
- Maximilian Schmid (born 2003), German footballer
- Mia Schmid (born 2005), Swiss footballer
- Michael Schmid (disambiguation), multiple people
- Monika S. Schmid, German linguist
- Nicolas Schmid (born 1997), Austrian footballer
- Nils Schmid (born 1973), German politician
- Olaf Schmid (1979–2009), UK bomb disposal officer
- Patricia Schmid (born 1985), Swiss fashion model
- Paul Schmid, American politician
- Peter Schmid (disambiguation), multiple people
- Pia Schmid, Swiss Paralympic athlete
- Richard Schmid (1934–2021), American artist
- Romano Schmid (born 2000), Austrian footballer
- Rudi Schmid (1922–2007), Swiss-born American medical researcher
- Rudolf Schmid (disambiguation), multiple people
- Samuel Schmid (born 1948), Swiss politician
- Sandra Schmid (born 1958), Canadian cell biologist
- Sigi Schmid (1953–2018), American soccer coach
- Shahanah Schmid (born 1976), Swiss chess master
- Stefan Schmid (born 1970), German decathlete
- Stéfanie Schmid (born 1968), Swiss competitive figure skater
- Susanne Schmid (disambiguation), multiple people
- Sven Schmid (born 1978), German fencer
- Tabea Schmid (born 2003), Swiss female handballer
- Thomas Schmid (disambiguation), multiple people
- Tommy Schmid (born 1988), Swiss Nordic combined skier
- Toni Schmid (1909–1932), German mountaineer
- Ulrich Schmid (disambiguation), multiple people
- Ute Schmid (born 1965), German computer scientist
- Walter Schmid (born 1944), Swiss entrepreneur
- Walter Jürgen Schmid (born 1946), German diplomat
- Wilfried Schmid (born 1943), German-American mathematician
- Wilhelm Schmid (disambiguation), multiple people
- Willi Schmid (1893–1934), German music critic
- Yannick Schmid (born 1995), Swiss footballer

== See also ==
- F.X. Schmid
- Schmied
- Schmidt (disambiguation)
- Schmitt (disambiguation)
- Schmitz
