= 1787 in music =

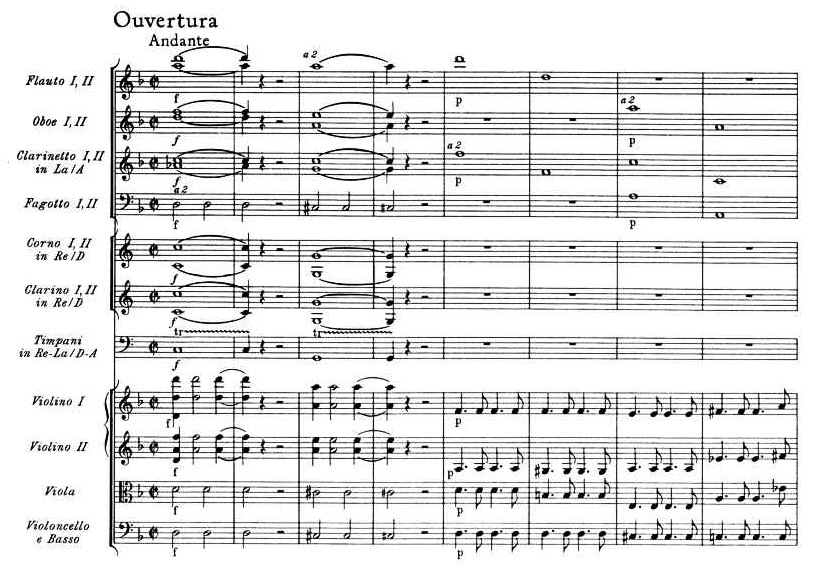
Overture from Don Giovanni by Mozart, 1787

== Events ==
- Between January and April – Beethoven and Mozart: 16-year-old Ludwig van Beethoven goes to Vienna, intending to study with Mozart: it is possible that they meet and have some lessons together, but the declining health of Beethovens' mother forces him to return to Bonn.
- February 1 – A posthumous performance of Antonio Sacchini's Œdipe à Colone at the Paris Opéra results in the previously unsuccessful opera becoming one of the most popular pieces in the repertoire for several decades.
- August 10 – Wolfgang Amadeus Mozart completes his famous serenade Eine kleine Nachtmusik.
- October 29 – Mozart's opera Don Giovanni is premiered under his baton at the Nostitzsches Nationaltheater in Prague, with libretto by Lorenzo Da Ponte.
- December
  - Mozart is appointed chamber composer to Emperor Joseph II in Vienna following the death of Gluck.
  - Angelo Tarchi is appointed music director and composer at the King's Theatre in London.
- Luigi Boccherini becomes court composer in Berlin.
- Luigi Cherubini settles in Paris.

== Publications ==
- Scots Musical Museum, vol. 1

== Published popular music ==
- Robert Burns – "The Battle of Sherramuir" (to a traditional tune)
- "Ein Schifflein sah ich fahren" (Soldier Song ca.1787)

== Classical music ==
- Carl Philipp Emanuel Bach
  - Fantasia in F-sharp minor, H.300
  - Neue Melodien, H.781
- William Brown – 3 Rondos
- Charles Burney – Preludes, Fugues and Interludes for the Organ
- Muzio Clementi
  - Two Symphonies, Op. 18
  - Musical Characteristics, Op. 19
  - Piano Sonata, Op. 20
- Michel Corrette – Pièces pour l’orgue dans un genre nouveau
- Francois Devienne – Flute Concerto No.7 in E minor
- Jean-Louis Duport – Cello Concerto No.1 in A major, Op. 1
- Giuseppe Gherardeschi – Sonata for Organ "In the Guise of a Military Band..."
- Joseph Haydn
  - The Seven Last Words of Christ
  - Symphony No. 88 in G
  - String Quartets, Op. 50 (String Quartets Nos. 36–41)
- Franz Anton Hoffmeister – 2 Keyboard Sonatas, WeiH 80
- Leopold Kozeluch
  - Three Symphonies, Op. 22
  - Three Symphonies, Op. 24
  - Moise in Egitto
- Joseph Martin Kraus – Symphony in E minor
- Jose Lidon – 6 Piezas o Sonatas sueltas para órgano
- Wolfgang Amadeus Mozart
  - Eine kleine Nachtmusik
  - String Quintet No. 3 in C major
  - String Quintet No. 4 in G minor
  - Rondo in A minor, K.511
  - Clarinet Quintet, K.Anh.91
  - Musikalisches Würfelspiel, K.516f
  - Ein musikalischer Spaß (A Musical Joke)
  - "Die Alte", K.517
  - "Die Verschweigung", K.518
  - "Das Lied der Trennung", K.519
  - "Als Luise die Briefe", K.520
  - "Abendempfindung", K.523
  - "Die kleine Spinnerin", K.531
  - 5 Country Dances, K.609
- William Parsons – The Court Minuets for Her Majesty's Birth Day, 1787
- Philip Phile – Violin Concerto (lost)
- Ignaz Pleyel – 3 String Trios, B.401–403

== Opera ==
- Samuel Arnold – Inkle and Yarico (libretto by George Colman the Younger)
- Luigi Boccherini – La Clementina, G.540
- Domenico Cimarosa – Volodimiro
- Giuseppe Gazzaniga – Don Giovanni
- Vicente Martín y Soler – L'arbore di Diana
- Wolfgang Amadeus Mozart – Don Giovanni
- Antonio Salieri – Tarare (libretto by Beaumarchais)
- Giovanni Paisiello – La modista raggiratrice, R.1.74

== Methods and theory writings ==
- Ferdinand Kauer – Kurzgefaßte Clavierschule für Anfänger
- Edward Miller – Elements of Thorough Bass and Composition, Op. 5
- Etienne Ozi – Nouvelle méthode de basson
- Carl Leopold Röllig – Über die Harmonika

== Births ==
- January 30 – Anton Schmid, music historian, librarian, and musician (died 1857)
- January 31 – Ulric Guttinguer, librettist and writer (died 1866)
- February 13 – James P. Carrell, singing teacher and composer (died 1854)
- February 24 – Christian Frederik Barth, oboist and composer (died 1861)
- March 1 – Tobias Haslinger, composer and publisher (died 1842)
- April 14 – Charles-François Plantade, French composer (died 1870)
- April 26 – Ludwig Uhland, librettist and poet (died 1862)
- July 7 – César Malan, composer and theologian (died 1864)
- August 15 – Alexander Alyabyev, composer (died 1851)
- November 17 – Michele Carafa, composer (died 1872)
- November 21 – Barry Cornwall, librettist and poet (died 1874)
- November 25 – Franz Xaver Gruber, organist and composer of "Silent Night" (died 1863)
- December 4 – Johan Fredrik Berwald, violinist, conductor and composer (died 1861)
- December 13 – Anne-Honoré-Joseph Duveyrier, librettist and dramatist (died 1865)
- December 14 – Maria Ludovika, patron of Beethoven and queen of Austria (died 1816)
- date unknown
  - Franz Xaver Gebel, German composer (died 1843)
  - Catharina Torenberg, violinist (died 1866)

== Deaths ==
- February 21 – Antonio Rodríguez de Hita, composer (born 1722)
- March 30 – Princess Anna Amalia of Prussia, musician, composer and music collector (born 1723)
- April 22 – Josef Starzer, Austrian composer (born 1726)
- May 20 – Giovan Gualberto Brunetti, Italian composer (born 1706)
- May 28 – Leopold Mozart, violinist, music teacher and composer (born 1719)
- June – Ignazio Fiorillo, opera composer (born 1715)
- June 20 – Carl Friedrich Abel, viola da gamba player and composer (born 1723)
- July 13 – Ignazio Cirri, composer and musician (born 1711)
- July 27 – Mary Linley, singer (born 1758)
- August 5 – François Francoeur, violinist and composer (born 1698)
- August 18 – Stephen Paxton, composer and musician (born 1734)
- November 15 – Christoph Willibald Gluck, composer (born 1714)
- November 23 – Anton Schweitzer, opera composer (born 1735)
- December 9 – Bernhard Joachim Hagen, composer, violinist and lutenist (born 1720)
- date unknown – Edward Harwood (of Darwen), hymn-writer (born 1707)
