= Anton Schmid =

Anton Schmid may refer to:

- Anton Schmid (Oberst), recipient of the Knight's Cross of the Iron Cross
- Anton Schmid (politician) (1819–1893), German politician who was a member of the Landtag of Bavaria
- Anton Schmid (Righteous Among the Nations) (1900–1942), Austrian military officer who resisted the Nazis
- Anton Schmid (writer) (1787–1857), Austrian writer, librarian, music historian, musician, and music educator
- Anton Edler von Schmid (1765–1855), Austrian printer and publisher of Hebrew books
