= Kemondo Iron Age Sites =

National Historic Site of Tanzania

- Site location in Tanzania
- 1°27′29″S 31°46′28″E
- Type: settlement
- Periods: Early Iron Age
- Cultures: Haya
- Location: Bukoba Rural District, Kagera Region, Tanzania
- Region: Eastern Africa

Site notes
- Excavation dates: 1970s & 1980s
- Archaeologists: Peter Schmidt
- Condition: Excavated
- Owner: Tanzanian Government
- Management: Antiquities Division, Ministry of Natural Resources and Tourism
- Public access: Yes

National Historic Sites of Tanzania
- Official name: Kemondo Iron Age Sites
- Type: Cultural

Kemondo Iron Age Sites or KM2 and KM3 are Early Iron Age complex industrial archaeological sites in Kemondo ward, Bukoba Rural District, Kagera Region, Tanzania, excavated by a team led by archaeologist Peter Schmid in the late 1970s and 1980s. The excavations aimed at better understanding the iron smelting process and its ritual aspects in East Africa. At the KM2 and KM3 sites, Schmidt tested the hypothesis that the high combustion temperature of furnaces, discovered to be between 1,350–1,400 °C (2,460–2,550 °F), was caused by the preheating of air blasts. Preheating has been suggested to be a distinct feature of African Early Iron Age smelting techniques by ethnographic observations of the Haya people of northwestern Tanzania.

== Description ==
=== Locations ===
KM2 site is located 14 m (46 ft) above Lake Victoria on a knoll 500 m (1,600 ft) west of the Kemondo Bay port facility. It was discovered in early 1977 by a Tanzanian member of Peter Schmidt's team as he walked over a newly exposed road surface that had been opened as part of the new Kemondo Bay port access road.

The KM3 site is situated 1 km (0.62 mi) south of KM2 and sits 75–85 m (246–279 ft) above Lake Victoria. It was discovered during a village survey by a Tanzanian surveyor, who observed furnace bricks on a main path bisecting the site.

=== Radiocarbon dating ===
The radiocarbon dates from the KM2 site are derived from wood charcoal found beneath furnace bricks or slag in the deeper stratigraphic zones of the furnace pits. The KM2 radiocarbon dates show that there are 4 distinct use periods of the site: the first is an occupation period that spans from 300 to 200 BC; the second is an industrial period in 100-200 AD, after which there is a hiatus from 200 to 300 AD; the third in the 400-500 AD; and the fourth falls from the beginning of 600 AD into early 700 AD.

All 10 dates of KM3 site are derived from furnace pits. The dates show that there are three use periods at the KM3 site: the first period is represented by two contiguous furnaces that are dated to the 100-200 AD (or between c. 50 BC and 250 AD); the second during 300 AD, when iron production was performed only in one episode at KM3 and was totally absent at KM2; and the third in 400-500 AD, which was also an active period at KM2, but the end of iron smelting at KM3. During the last use period of KM2 in the 600-700 AD, KM3 site was not used for iron production.

== Iron technology ==
In KM2, the bases of 13 intact and 2 disturbed Early Iron Age furnaces were excavated along with a large industrial refuse pit and iron artifacts. The furnace bowls were lined with earth from termite mounds and the furnace shaft was built with bricks. The furnaces have a mean diameter of 93.6 cm (36.9 in), ranging between 86–103 cm (34–41 in) in diameter, with 10 of the 11 furnaces between 93–103 cm (37–41 in). In KM2, large amounts of industrial debris and domestic pottery were dumped into a refuse pit alongside discarded furnace bricks, slag, tuyères, iron fragments, and charcoal.

At the KM3 site are mines, slag dumps, ore-processing areas, industrial refuse dumps, and smelting furnaces. Smelting furnaces were abundant, although recent farming practices in the core of the industrial site had disturbed some furnaces. The KM3 furnaces are more consistent in design and contents than the KM2 furnace pits. The furnace bowls are larger and more regular in size than the KM2 furnaces, with a mean diameter of 113.8 cm (44.8 in), ranging only between 112–116 cm (44–46 in). The mean depth of 28 cm (11 in) among KM3 furnace pits is significantly greater than the mean depth of 18 cm (7.1 in) at KM2, a difference attributable to the more complete preservation at KM3.

The furnace bowls excavated on KM2 and KM3 were filled with a variety of materials, including slag, pieces of partly reduced iron ore, fired bricks used to build the furnace, charcoal, pieces of tuyères, as well as some domestic pottery.

=== Tuyères ===
Preheating of air blasts allowed the furnaces to achieve higher combustion temperatures, which dramatically improved fuel efficiency in the iron production process. Peter Schmidt observed that the Haya in northwestern Tanzania employed the practice of preheating by placing tuyères inside their furnaces, which results in hot air blast. The study of KM2 and KM3 sites allowed for the collection of more definitive evidence for prehistoric tuyères, in order to discern how and when preheated iron technology developed in Africa.

The tuyères employed inside the smelting furnace must be made of clay that is highly refractory. The heat transfer through the clay has to be sufficiently high to heat up the air passing through the clay chamber, in order to achieve a higher temperature in the blast zone, which in turns leads to more heat transfer through the clay walls of the tuyère. Many small pieces of tuyère with physical characteristics indicating their presence inside furnaces were recovered at the KM2 site. The majority of tuyère fragments show convincing evidence in their colors to indicate that they were inside the prehistoric smelting furnaces of KM2.

The hypothesis that preheating had developed at least by the 400 AD in Africa has been confirmed by the discovery of a 36 cm (14 in) whole or long section of tuyère uncovered in furnace 9 of KM3. The tuyère is 40% (14.5 cm (5.7 in)) slag-wetted and vitrified, and the slag-wetted section is gray in color, suggesting exposure to oxidation. Other physical properties of the tuyère, such as the reduction of clay, also suggest that tuyères had been placed inside Early Iron Age furnaces for the preheating of air blast.

=== Swamp grass ===
A small pile of charred reeds was found adjacent to furnace 3 in KM2, and since furnace bowls tend to be cleared out after smelting, this serves as the most direct evidence for the use of swamp grass in the iron production process. Ethnographic study of the Haya people in Northwestern Tanzania shows that swamp grass is burned in the furnace bowl until the bowl is filled with the charred swamp reeds. When the iron ore melts above the tuyères, it forms a molten slag with carbon inclusions. The slag then interacts with the fibrous, carbonaceous bed provided by the burned swamp grass, which in turn provides an extremely high carbon-slag contact area for the subsequent carburization of the bloom. The charred reeds also allow the draining of slag from the blast zone, as the slag runs down the inside of the grass stalks and through the spaces between the reeds to the bottom of the furnace pit.

=== Termite linings ===
60% of the KM2 furnaces were lined with termite earth, but only one of the KM3 furnaces had traces of an artificial liner. It is uncertain if furnace liners were not as common at KM3 or if they had been removed from furnaces. The earth of a termite mound is more refractory than normal soil because termites select quartz sand grains from the subsoil to build their mounds. Termite mound soil is used as insulation, and employed for its resistance to fusion with slag.

== Ritual medicine ==
=== Furnace holes ===
Of the 15 furnace bowls excavated at the KM2 site, six had a small hole in the floor. Ethnographic evidence suggests that iron smelters excavated holes in their furnaces in order to place in it magical devices or ritual medicine. Sometimes these ritual objects were used to increase productivity or to protect against sinister forces that might disrupt the smelt. The properties of the ritual materials are those that the smelters hoped to impart to the iron bloom.

=== Iron bloom ===
Of the seven furnaces excavated at KM3, only furnace number 8, dated to 100 AD, has shown evidence of ritual modification. In the furnace floor, a small pit was discovered that contained a 6-cm-tall piece of prehistoric iron bloom, which was shown to have no relationship to the technological operation of the furnace. Later metallurgical analysis of the iron bloom shows evidence that the piece of iron had been produced by a smelting process that had formed large, dense, relatively slag-free bloom. The placement of this unprocessed iron in the pit evokes ethnographic comparison to iron smelting rituals that ensure the production of high-quality iron that mimics the attribute of the ritual device.

== See also ==
- National Historic Sites in Tanzania
