= Peter Schmid =

Peter Schmid may refer to:

- Peter Schmid (skier)
- Peter Schmid (archaeologist) (1926–2022)
- Peter Schmid (swimmer) (born 1949)

== See also ==
- Peter Schmidt (disambiguation)
