= Wilhelm Schmid =

Wilhelm Schmid may refer to:

- Wilhelm Schmid (scholar) (1859–1951), German classical scholar
- Wilhelm Schmid (SA-Gruppenführer) (1889–1934), German Nazi SA general
- Wilhelm Schmid (painter) (1892–1971)
- Wilhelm Schmid (ice hockey) (1921–1980), Austrian ice hockey player

See also:

- Willi Schmid, Wilhelm Schmid's nickname, an accidental victim of the Night of the Long Knives
- Wilhelm Schmidt (disambiguation)
