= Viechtach =

- Town
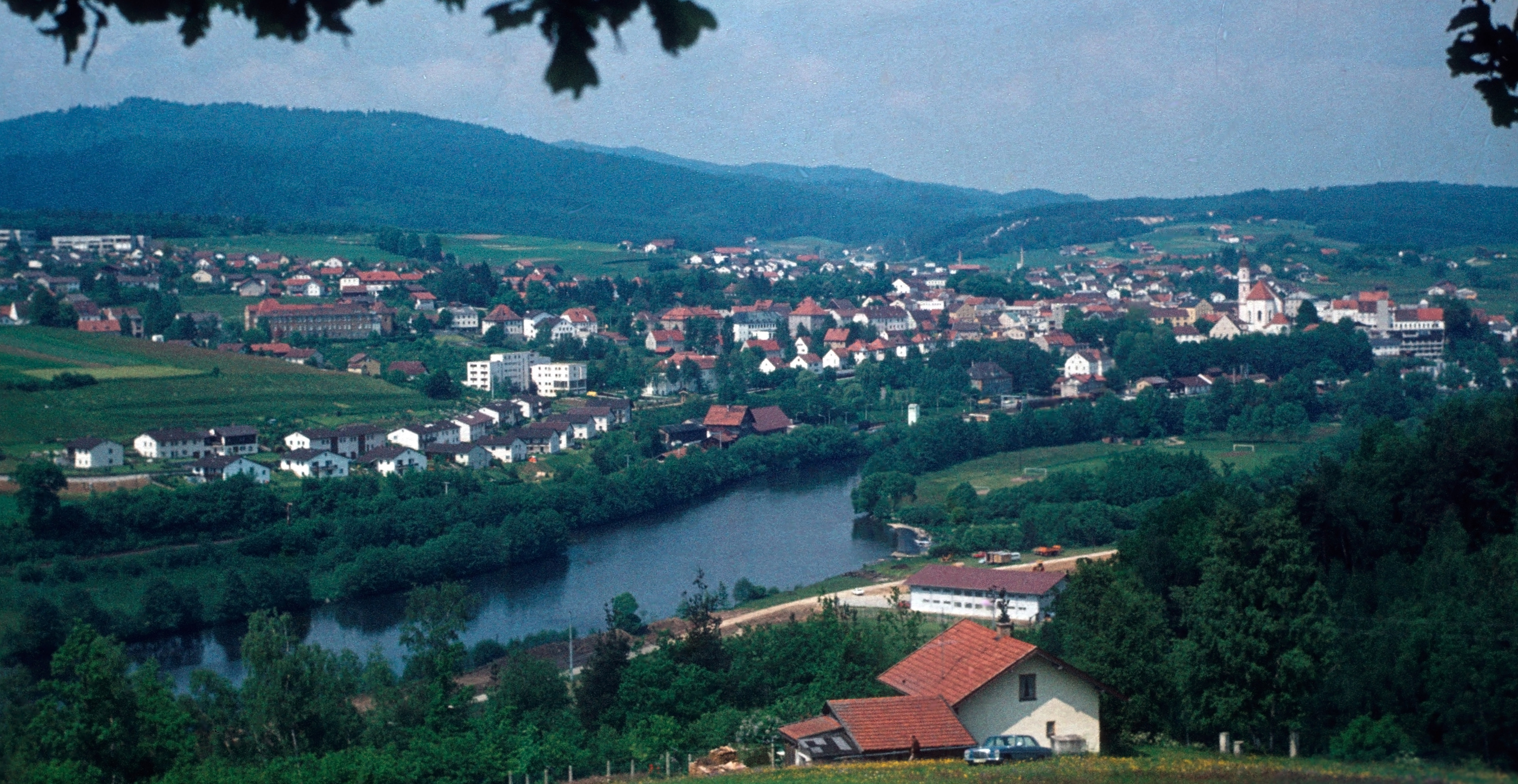
- Viechtach

- Coat of arms

- Location of Viechtach within Regen district
- Interactive map of Viechtach
- Location within Germany Location within Bavaria
- Coordinates: 49°4′45″N 12°53′5″E
- Country: Germany
- State: Bavaria
- Admin. region: Niederbayern
- District: Regen

Government
  - Mayor (2020–26): Franz Wittmann (CSU)

Area
  - Total: 62.47 km^{2} (24.12 sq mi)
- Elevation: 435 m (1,427 ft)

Population (2025-12-31)
  - Total: 8,326
  - Density: 133.3/km^{2} (345.2/sq mi)
- Time zone: UTC+01:00 (CET)
  - Summer (DST): UTC+02:00 (CEST)
- Postal codes: 94234
- Dialling codes: 09942
- Vehicle registration: REG
- Website: www.viechtach.de

Viechtach (German pronunciation: [ˈfiːçtax]) is a town in the district of Regen in Bavaria in Germany. It is situated on the river Schwarzer Regen, 31 km northeast of Straubing, and it is known for the quartz mountains nearby.

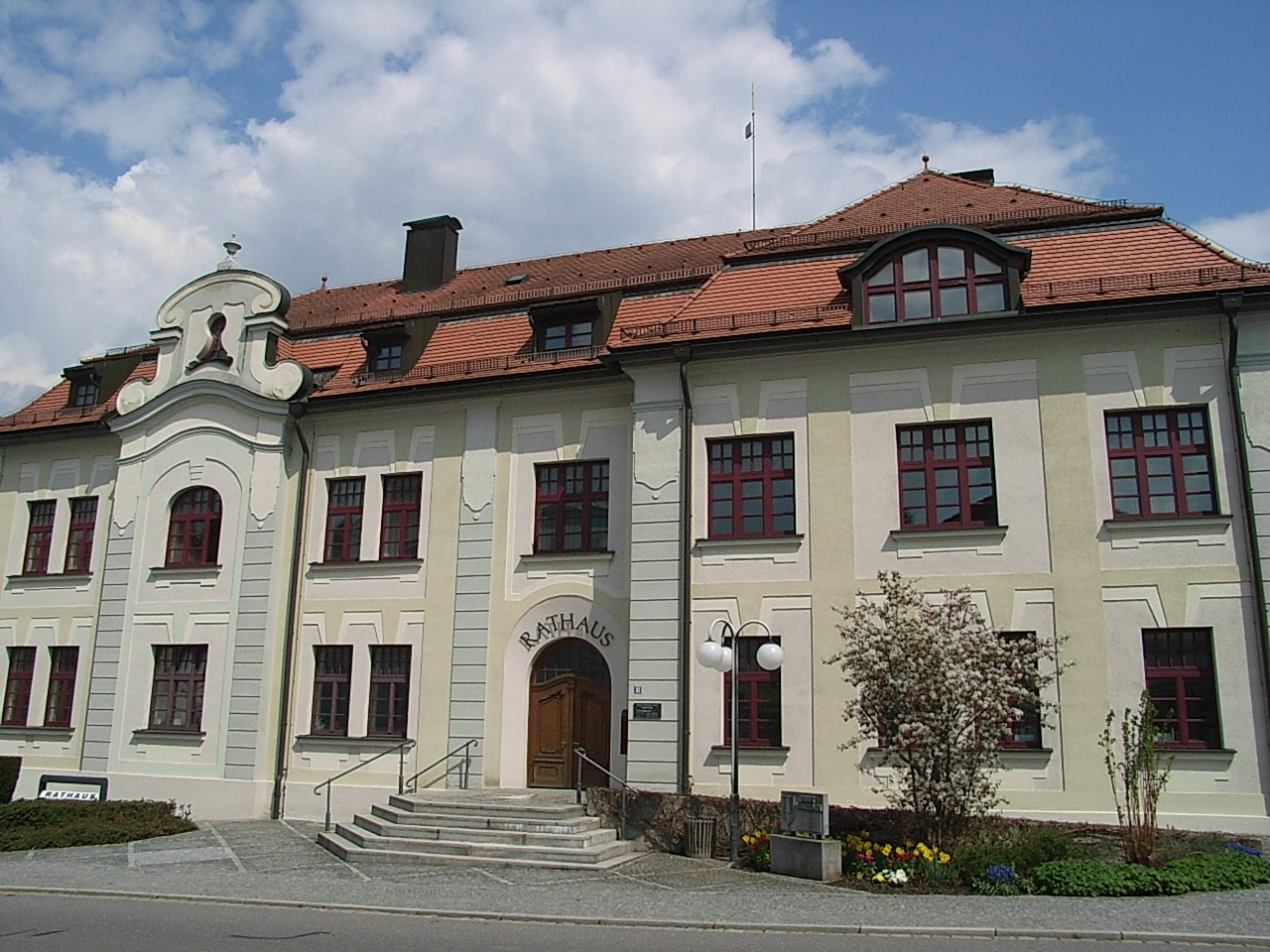
The Rathaus (town hall) in Viechtach

== Notable people ==
- Anton Schmid (1819–1893), politician
