= Symphony No. 88 (Haydn) =

Symphony by Joseph Haydn

- by Joseph Haydn
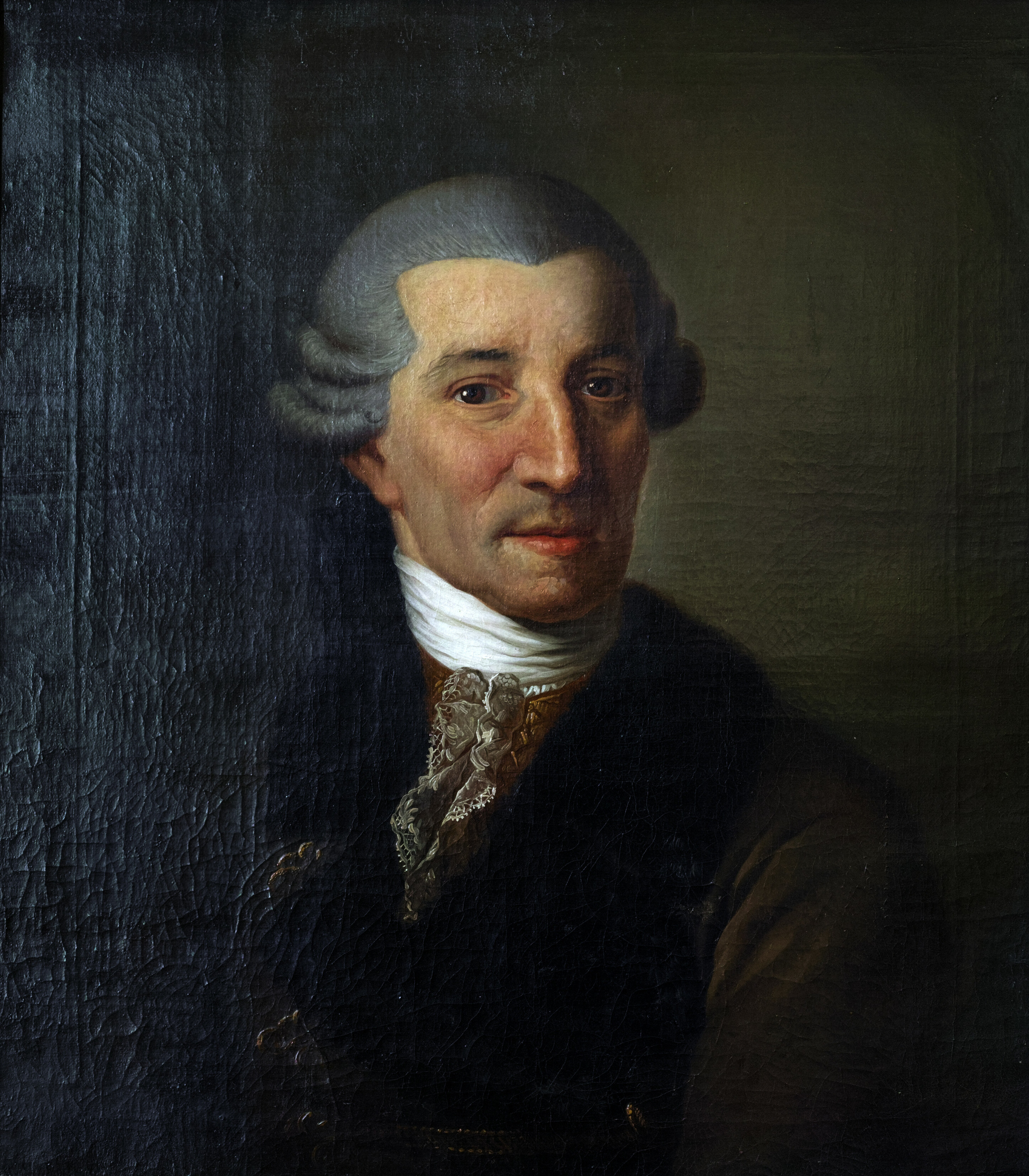
- Portrait of Joseph Haydn by Christian Ludwig Seehas, 1785
- Other name: The Letter V
- Key: G major
- Catalogue: Hob. I:88
- Composed: 1787
- Dedication: Nikolaus I, Prince Esterházy
- Duration: c. 25 minutes
- Movements: 4
- Scoring: Orchestra

Symphony No. 88 in G major (Hoboken I/88) was written by Joseph Haydn, for the orchestra of Esterháza under Prince Nikolaus Esterhazy. It is notably the first of his symphonies written after the completion of the six Paris Symphonies in 1786.

The symphony was completed in 1787, just like his 89th symphony. It is one of Haydn's best-known works, even though it is not one of the Paris or London Symphonies and does not have a descriptive nickname. It is sometimes referred to as The Letter V referring to an older method of cataloging Haydn's symphonic output.

== Music ==
The symphony is scored for flute, two oboes, two bassoons, two horns, two trumpets, timpani, continuo (harpsichord) and strings.

It is in standard four-movement form:

1. Adagio — Allegro
2. Largo
3. Menuetto: Allegretto
4. Finale. Allegro con spirito

The first movement begins with a brief introduction which quickly settles to the dominant chord to prepare for the main body of the movement. The strings open the Allegro stating the main theme and the rest of the movement develops from there, with almost every statement deriving from a previous idea. The exposition is monothematic and the development continues to make use of that single melodic idea. In the recapitulation, the initial statement of the theme is embellished by a solo flute.

The slow movement in D major consists mainly of embellishments of the legato oboe and solo cello theme which opens it, though every so often is punctuated by chords played by the whole orchestra. After hearing this slow movement, Brahms is said to have remarked, "I want my Ninth Symphony to sound like this". It is the second of Haydn's symphonies to use trumpets and timpani in the slow movement, the first being the Symphony No. 60 "Il Distratto" of 1774. Haydn’s close friend Mozart had previously used trumpets and timpani in the slow movement of his Symphony No. 36 "Linz" of 1783.

The minuet is in G major. The trio has an unusual feature to it: after stating a rather simple theme, the fifths held in the bassoons and violas shift down a fourth in parallel, an effect typically avoided by the classical composers.

The finale is a sonata-rondo, with the rondo theme first presented in binary form. The first section of this movement is noteworthy for ending on an unusual cadence on the mediant. A "perpetual-motion finale," it is considered one of the most cheerful Haydn ever wrote.
