= Franz Schmid (disambiguation) =

Franz Schmid (1905–1992), was a German mountaineer.

Franz Schmid may refer to:

- Franz Schmid (politician) (born 2000), German politician
- Franz Xaver Schmid (1819–1883), Austrian-German educator and philosopher
