= Julian Schmid =

Julian Schmid may refer to:

- Julian Schmid (politician)
- Julian Schmid (skier)

== See also ==
- Julian Schmidt (disambiguation)
