= Bernhard Schmid =

German missionary and botanist in India

Ludwig Bernhard Ehregott Schmid (March 20, 1788 – October 20, 1857) was a German Lutheran clergyman and missionary who worked in India. Ill health led him to choose to live in Ootacamund and he spent considerable time examining local plants, and making collections of specimens, many of which were deposited in Jena where his cousin J. C. Zenker published a few descriptions but died too early to produce a more complete work. Several plant species have been named after Schmid including the fossil trees Peuce schmidiana and Mesembrioxylon schmidianum from Thiruvakkarai near Pondicherry.

== Biography ==
Schmid was the son of Rudolf Ludwig, a deacon and pastor at Wöllnitz and later a preacher in Sulzbach near Apolda in 1796. Schmid's mother died in 1806 and his father remarried. After being schooled at Lobeda and Sulzbach, he was taught in Jena by Carl Christian Schmid, and studied classical languages as well as botany, with lectures by August Batsch. From 1807 to 1809 he studied theology at the University of Jena and then became a private tutor to the von Clermont family at Vaals near Aachen. In 1811 he became a teacher of languages at Homburg and became interested in Sanskrit. He was posted pastor in Trarbach and later became a tutor to Karl Friedrich Reinhard. From 1814 he began to study Arabic and Armenian in Paris but had to leave in 1815 when Napoleon returned from Elba and then spent time in Karl Friedrich Reinhard's Falkenlust estate. A younger brother, Deocar, who sought to become a missionary asked the elder to accompany him on travel and went to London in 1816. He too joined as a missionary and on April 11, 1817, he left for Madras, arriving on August 4. Schmid was posted to Palayamkottai in 1819 and then went to the Nilgiris in May 1831 followed by Mayavaram from July 1834. He preached in English and Tamil. After a brief visit back to Jena in July 1837 he returned to India with a number of plant specimens which went to the Jena Botanical Garden. Poor health made him seek to live in the Nilgiri hills and as a non-British resident he had to seek permission from the British government which granted him permission to live in the Nilgiris. His home was Lakeside Cottage on the northwestern shore of Ooty lake. He spent a lot of his time on botanical studies and neglected missionary activity. Along with his wife who ran a school of the Church Missionary Society, he lived in the Nilgiris off and on from 1830 to 1836 and more permanently after returning from Europe in 1845 (a trip that included hydropathy treatments at Almenau in 1841). He died at Calicut.

=== Botany and other works ===
Schmid corresponded with botanists in India as well as in Europe. In the Madras Journal of Literature and Science he wrote on the benefits of botanical pursuits and recommended it as a pastime - "The man who loves Botany for its own sake, knows not the feelings of envy, jealousy and rivalship, nor is he dependent for happiness on situations and scenes that favour their growth." He sought to supply plant specimens to European collectors and wrote to Sir William Hooker that he was interested in starting a botanical garden in the Nilgiris to see how European plants "changed their forms and appeared as new species in the hill climate." Hooker supplied him with seeds. The contemporary Scottish botanist Robert Wight described and named Dichrocephala schmidii after Schmid and was also inspired to publish his own notes on the plants of the Nilgiris after some of the plants collected by Schmid were described by his cousin Jonathan Carl Zenker in 1835. These included the ferns Aspidium anomophyllum (Dryopteridaceae), Grammitis cuspidata (Polypodiaceae) and Adiantum cycloides (Pteridaceae) apart from Ophioglossum schmidii described by Kunze. Samples of fossil wood that Schmid collected from Thiruvakkarai was described by Mathias Schleiden and E.E. Schmid of Jena who identified an angiosperm Peuce schmidiana and a conifer Mesembrioxylon schmidianum. Schmid also took an interest in philology and was especially interested in the Toda language. He incorrectly estimated that two thirds of the Toda vocabulary were derived from Tamil. He also espoused fantastic ideas on Odin being related to the Buddha through the similarity of the word for Wednesday to that used in Tamil. He also published books on English Orthoepy or Pronouncing Spelling Book, translations of Baxter's Saints' Rest, and First Books of Thomas a Kempis.
