= Christoph Schmid (disambiguation) =

Christoph Schmid (born 1982), is a Swiss sport shooter.

Christoph Schmid may refer to:

- Christoph Schmid (politician) (born 1976), German politician
- Christoph von Schmid (1768–1854), German priest, writer and educator
