= Walter Schmid =

Swiss entrepreneur (born 1944)

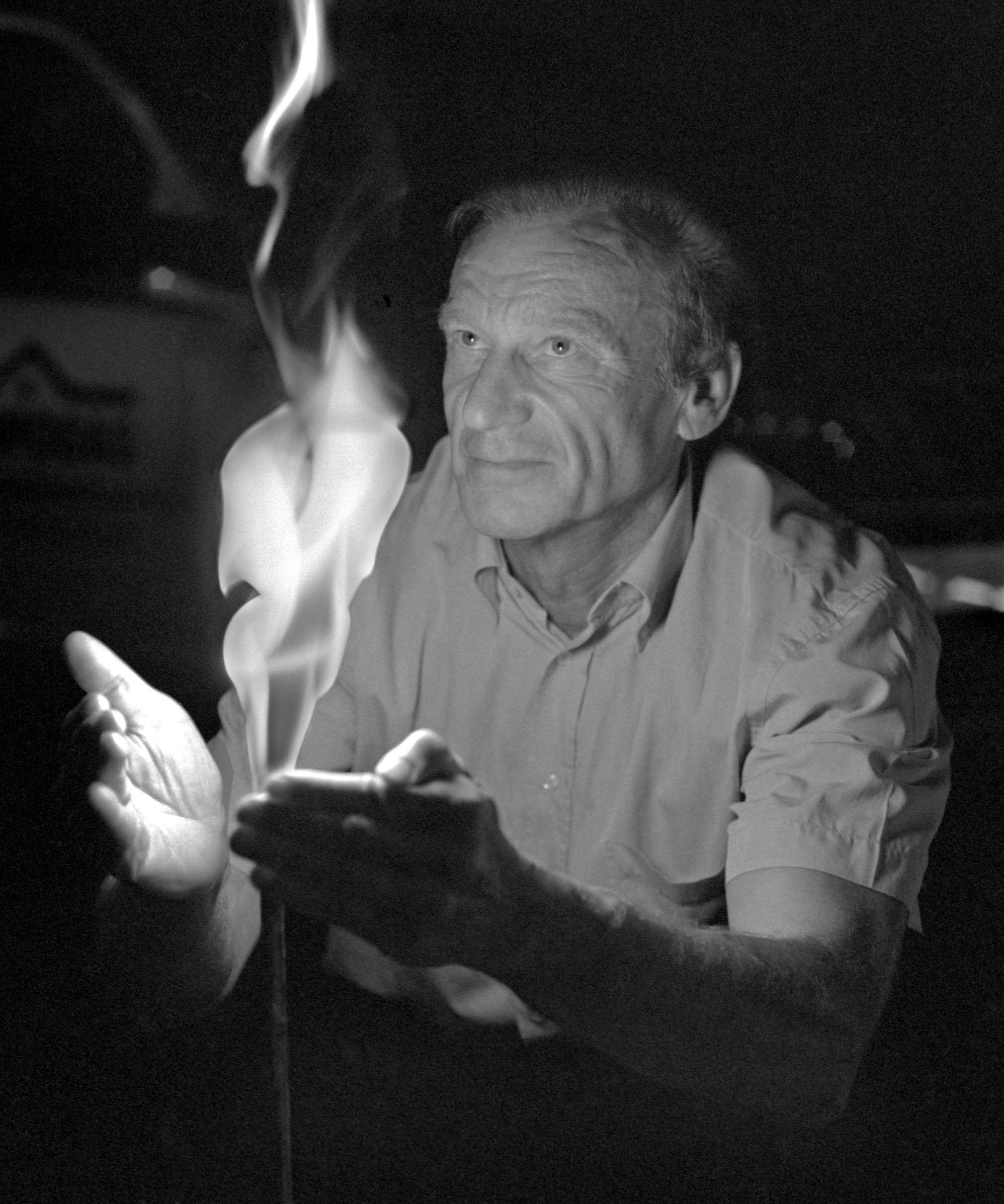
- Schmid with the Kompogas in 2005
- Born: November 8, 1944 (age 81); Oberhelfenschwil, Switzerland
- Occupation: Entrepreneur
- Known for: Developer of the Kompogas-Process

Walter Schmid (born 8 November 1944) is a Swiss entrepreneur. He is merited with the development of the Kompogas-Process around 1989, and the Kompogas company founded in 1991 (since 2011 Axpo Kompogas AG, since 2014 Hitachi Zosen Inova AG) both well-known in Switzerland. The seat of his construction company is Glattbrugg.

== Life and works ==
Walter Schmid founded the construction business under his name in 1966, when he was 21 years old; he started with five employees when he took over the construction company G. Fumasoli in Glattbrugg. From an early age, Schmid pragmatically built everything technically feasible to save (fossil) energy, always in the hope that the solutions would also pay off economically.

As early as 1975, Walter Schmid built one of the first vacuum solar collector systems in Switzerland, combined with a wood heating system. This was followed by earth collectors, deep water drilling and in 1988 his first building integrated photovoltaic system. Today, the construction company employs about 130 people.

=== "Solcar" ===
In contrast to building construction, where Schmid could implement his ideas independently, his electric vehicle concept "Solcar" was awarded prizes in 1990, but found only 150 of the required 500 buyers, so the project was discontinued.

=== Kompogas ===
In 1989, after a trial on the balcony a fermenter of 20 cubic meters was developed. He founded in 1991, funded by the Canton of Zurich, the company Kompogas, which produces biogas and compost from vegetable waste.

Schmid first had to prevail against numerous politicians to get green waste. As early as 2005, the Handelszeitung wrote that rising energy prices would help in the future for such projects.

Kompogas AG started in Rümlang with an annual output of approx. 2.8 million kWh. Since 1995 lorries filled with biogas from Walter Schmid AG and the company Kompogas travel the roads, the first truck reached its millionth kilometer in the summer of 2010. In 2009, Kompogas produced 18 million kilowatt hours of electricity and 9 million kilowatt hours of biogas in Switzerland.

There are 80 plants worldwide in operation, with the largest plant in Qatar. In the Swiss plants, the resulting compost can be obtained free of charge from the population and is certified for organic farming. Since 2006, Axpo has held a minority stake in Kompogas and in 2011, Axpo became the sole owner of the company. In October 2014, Hitachi Zosen Inova AG took over the plant of the Kompogas process from Axpo in Zurich.

15 fermentation plants using the Kompogas process will continue to be operated by Axpo.

=== Umwelt Arena ===
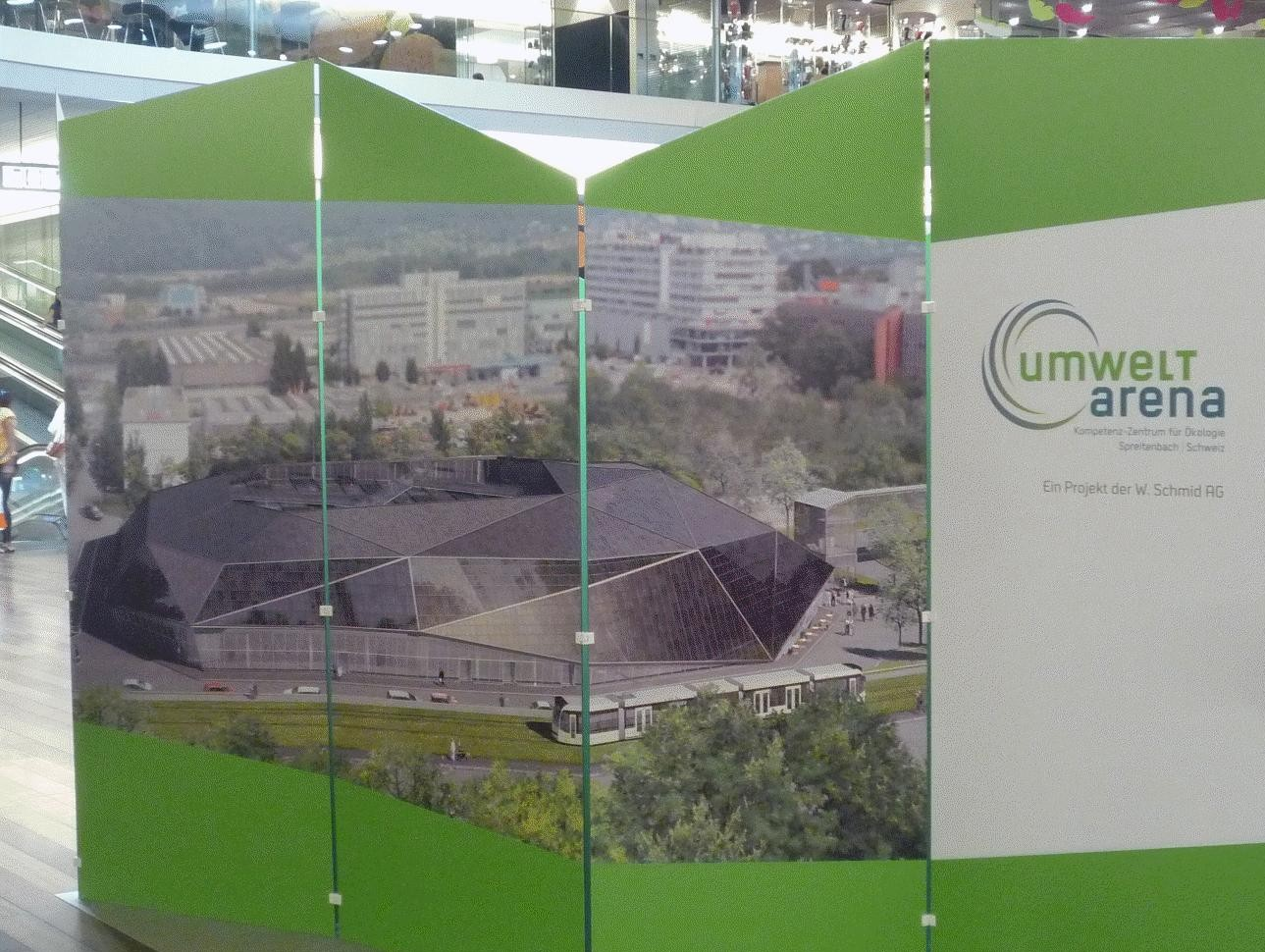
Umwelt Arena at the information booth in Shoppi Tivoli

After the experience with Kompogas and the related interest of the population, Walter Schmid built a center in Spreitenbach from 2010 to 2012, in which the population can find out about the latest state of the available energy efficiency techniques. According to Schmid's ideas, the technically feasible is to be shown there and nothing is sold. After Schmid made financial losses with many of his innovations, the construction of the environmental arena does not rely on proven technology; the entire building is cooled by heat exchange with the ground in summer and heated in winter. The energy for this automation system requires a maximum of 60 percent of the energy from the photovoltaic elements on the roofs surface.

Umwelt Arena AG was entered in the commercial register on 22 October 2009. Schmid invested 50 million francs in the project. For Walter Schmid the project is not completed with the completion of construction, but the enterprise must also be organized, not only energy-saving, but also communicative. The canton of Aargau maintains an exhibition on biodiversity, but this is the only contribution from the public sector. All other exhibitions are run by companies. The days in the week that are open to the public are Thursday through Sunday, since the building is also used as a venue.

=== Energy self-sufficient apartment building in Brütten ===
In Brütten, energy pioneer Schmid completed an apartment building in 2016 that is the first in the world to have no connections to other grids.

=== Private ===
Schmid is an avid motorist and was 1996 European champion in autocross. He lives in Zurich.

== Awards ==
- 2002: 2nd place in the Energy Globe Award
- 2003: Solar Prize Switzerland
- 2003: European Solar Prize
- 2010: Swiss Environmental Award
- Ecopreneur 2010
- Special Prize of Zurich Klimapreis 2011 – Zurich Insurance Group
- Watt d'Or 2012 Special Prize of the Jury
