= Daniel Schmid (disambiguation) =

Daniel Schmid (1941–2006), was a Swiss theatre and film director.

Dan or Daniel Schmid may refer to:

- Daniel Schmid (bobsledder) (born 1976), Swiss bobsledder
- Dan Schmid (born 1962), American musician
