= Friederike Schmid =

German physicist

Friederike Schmid is a German theoretical condensed-matter physicist and polymer scientist whose research involves the theory of complex fluids and polymer emulsions. She is a professor of theoretical physics at the University of Mainz.

== Education and career ==
Schmid studied physics as an undergraduate at Heidelberg University and LMU Munich, obtaining a diploma in 1989. She completed her Ph.D. in 1991 at the University of Mainz.

After postdoctoral research at the University of Washington and as an assistant to Kurt Binder at the University of Mainz, she earned a habilitation in 1997. From 1999 to 2000 she worked at the Max Planck Institute for Polymer Research, and in 2000, she obtained a professorship in theoretical physics at Bielefeld University. She moved to her present position as professor of theoretical physics at the University of Mainz in 2009.

== Recognition ==
Schmid was a 1998 recipient of the Gerhard Hess Award of the German Research Foundation. She was named a Fellow of the American Physical Society (APS) in 2022, after a nomination from the APS Division of Polymer Physics, "for innovative contributions in the development and application of dynamic density functional theory of polymers and dynamic coarse-graining approaches for soft matter in general".
