= Carlo Schmid =

Carlo Schmid may refer to:

- Carlo Schmid (German politician) (1896–1979), German academic and politician
- Carlo Schmid (Swiss pilot) (born 1990), Swiss pilot
- Carlo Schmid-Sutter (born 1950), Swiss politician
