= Franz Schmid (politician) =

German politician (born 2000)

Member of the Landtag of Bavaria
- Incumbent
- Assumed office 30 October 2023

Personal details
- Born: 4 October 2000 (age 25) Augsburg
- Party: Alternative for Germany (since 2019)

Franz Schmid (born 4 October 2000 in Augsburg) is a German politician serving as a member of the Landtag of Bavaria since 2023. He has served as chairman of the Alternative for Germany in Neu-Ulm since 2021.
