= William Brown (composer) =

- Occupations: Composer, Flutist, Music publisher
- Instrument: Flute
- Years active: 18th century

William Brown was an 18th-century American composer, flutist, and music publisher, active in Philadelphia and New York. He is known for his work Three Rondos for the Pianoforte or Harpsichord (1787), one of the earliest pieces of printed secular music for keyboards, and the first keyboard music to be published in the United States.
