= Thomas Schmid =

Thomas Schmid may refer to:

- Thomas Schmid (sailor)
- Thomas Schmid (rally driver)
