= Kendra Schmid =

American statistician and academic administrator

Kendra K. Schmid is an American statistician and academic administrator who works at the University of Nebraska–Lincoln as associate vice chancellor for academic affairs and interim vice provost, and in the University of Nebraska Medical Center as a professor of biostatistics. Her research interests include landmark-based statistical shape analysis in face recognition, facial symmetry and facial attractiveness, statistics education, and the applications of statistics in medical studies.

== Education and career ==
Schmid is originally from Hershey, Nebraska, and has a 2001 bachelor's degree in mathematics from Chadron State College in northwestern Nebraska. She continued her studies at the University of Nebraska–Lincoln, receiving a master's degree in statistics in 2004 and completing her Ph.D. in 2007; she later obtained a second master's degree, in educational administration, in 2017.

She has been a University of Nebraska Medical Center faculty member since 2007, and chaired the biostatistics department before taking up her present positions in higher administration.

== Recognition ==
The University of Nebraska Medical Center gave Schmid their 2013 Outstanding Teacher Award and their 2016 Distinguished Scientist Award. Schmid was elected as a Fellow of the American Statistical Association in 2026.
