= Anne-Françoise Schmid =

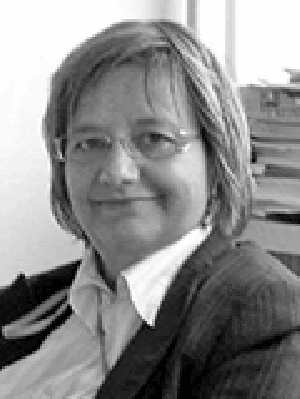
- Born: 17 September 1949 (age 77); Switzerland
- Spouse: François Laruelle
- Children: Lorraine Laruelle

Anne-Françoise Schmid (born 17 September 1949) is a Swiss-born French philosopher, formerly an associate researcher of Mines Paris-Tech. Schmid is a specialist in the philosophical works of Henri Poincaré, as well as being an associate researcher at the Henri Poincaré archives. Schmid has also edited the letters of correspondence between Bertrand Russell and Louis Couturat. She is also a founding member of a philosophical research initiative known as non-philosophy, alongside her spouse François Laruelle. Through this work, she has been publishing on generic epistemologies, which entails a non-exclusive epistemological practice that can be used to integrate the domains of problems exclusive to each and every disciplinary limit. With s Laruelle, she co-directs an international organization dedicated to furthering the cause of non-philosophy, the Organisation Non-Philosophique Internationale.

== Work ==
Schmid's work has been influential in contemporary biological practices, as well as in debates in issues of economic and social policies in France. Schmid's philosophy has also been directly influential to artists, such as Ivan Liovik Ebel, Benoit Maire, Alice Lucy Rekab, Tony Yanick, Yvette Granata, and more.

== Bibliography ==
- Anne-Françoise Schmid, Poincaré, les sciences et la philosophie. Maspero, Paris, 1978. Re-published by L’Harmattan, Paris, 2001.
- Anne-Françoise Schmid, L’Âge de l’épistémologie, Science, ingénierie, éthique. Paris, Kimé, 1998. Re-published by Kimé, 2019.
- Anne-Françoise Schmid, Que peut la philosophie des sciences. Pétra, Paris, 2001.
- Jean-Marie Legay and Anne-Françoise Schmid, Philosophie de l’Interdisciplinarité. Correspondance (1999-2004) sur la recherche scientifique, la modélisation et les objets complexes. Pétra, Paris, 2004.
- Nicole Mathieu and Anne-Françoise Schmid éds., Modélisation et Interdisciplinarité. Six disciplines en quête d’épistémologie. Quae, Paris, collection "Indisciplines", 2014.
- Maryse Dennes, John O’Maoilearca, Anne-Françoise Schmid, La Philosophie non-standard de François Laruelle. Cerisy/Classiques Garnier, Paris, 2019.
- Anne-Françoise Schmid, La invencion filosofica en el silencio del fururo. Translated by Ana Bolena Parra, Cali, Universidad del Valle, Programa Editorial, 2019.
- Anne-Françoise Schmid et Muriel Mambrini-Doudet, Epistémologie générique. Manuel pour les sciences futures. Kimé, Paris, 2019.
- Scripts philosophiques 1, le silence du futur, Collection « Studia Philosophica », Temple University, Chisokudo Publications, Tokyo, août 2021.
- Anne-Françoise Schmid et Ivan Liovik Ebel, Topographie discrète. Scénario pour un texte sans dimensions, Neuchâtel, Le Griffon, septembre 2021.
- Oliver Schlaudt & Anne-Françoise Schmid eds., Louis Couturat : The history of Modern Symbolic Logic and Other French Manuscripts, Birkhaüser, Springer Nature Switzerland, 2021.

Anne-Françoise Schmid, Scripts philosophiques II, Le Cogito des multiplicités,Collection « Studia Philosophica », Temple University, Chisokudo Publications, Tokyo, août 2025.
