= Ernst Erhard Schmid =

German paleontologist (1815–1885)

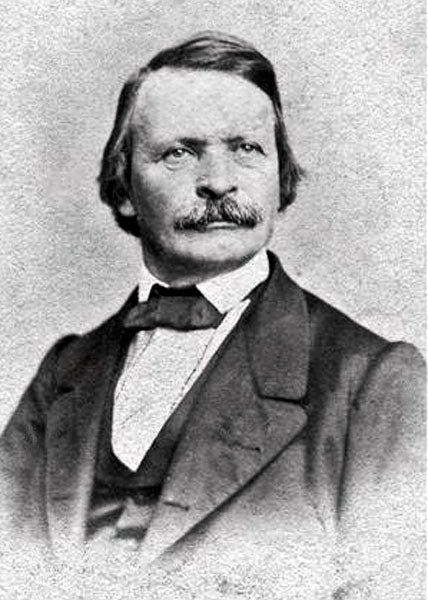
Ernst Erhard Schmid

Ernst Erhard Friedrich Wilhelm Schmid (22 May 1815 in Hildburghausen – 16 February 1885 in Jena) was a German paleontologist. He was the son of law professor Karl Ernst Schmid (1774–1852).

He studied natural sciences at the universities of Jena and Vienna, receiving his doctorate in 1839. In 1843 he became an associate professor at Jena, where with Matthias Jakob Schleiden, he founded a physiological institute. At the institute he dealt with subjects that included mineralogy, geology, chemistry and physics. In 1856 he was appointed a professor of natural sciences at the University of Jena.

In 1848 the ichthyopterygian species Tholodus schmidi was named in his honor by Christian Erich Hermann von Meyer.

== Published works ==
With Matthias Jacob Schleiden, he was co-author of an encyclopedia of theoretical science titled: "Encyclopädie der gesammten theoretischen Naturwissenschaften" (1850). Other significant works by Schmid are:

- Die geognostischen verhältnisse des Saalthales bei Jena (with Matthias Jacob Schleiden), 1846 – Geognostic conditions of the Saale valley near Jena.
- Physik, anorganische chemie und mineralogie, 1850 – Physics, inorganic chemistry and mineralogy.
- Topographisch geognostische Karte der Umgebungen von Jena der Universität zu ihrer dritten Säcularfeier gewidmet, 1859 – Topographical geognostic map of the surroundings of Jena.
- Lehrbuch der meteorologie, 1860 – Textbook of meteorology.
- Die Fischzähne der Trias bei Jena, 1861 – On Jurassic fish teeth found near Jena.
- Über den unteren Keuper des östlichen Thüringens, 1874 – On the Lower Keuper of eastern Thuringia.
- Die quarzfreien Porphyre des centralen Thüringer Waldgebirges und ihre Begleiter, 1880 – The quartz-free porphyry of the mountains in the central Thuringian Forest.
