= José Lidón =

Spanish composer (1748–1827)

José Lidón, or Josef Lidón, or José Lidón Blázquez (June 2, 1748 – February 11, 1827) was a Spanish composer, organist and conductor.

== Career ==
Lidón was born in Béjar, Salamanca. He entered the Royal Chapel of Madrid as an altar boy in 1758, having José de Nebra and organist Antonio de Literes as teachers. In 1763 he won a position in the Malaga Cathedral, a position he did not get to fill.

From 1768 he was an organist at the Orense Cathedral and the Madrid Royal Chapel, working in the service first of King Charles IV and afterwards Ferdinand VII. After the return of Ferdinand VII to the throne, he interceded for his friend and fellow composer Juan Oliver Astorga.

From 1805 until his death he held the charge of director of the Royal Chapel (maestro de la Capilla Real) in Madrid, and rector of the Real Colegio de Niños Cantores. Lidón died in Madrid in 1827.

== Work ==
His work is scattered across multiple archives including the Ciudad Real Cathedral, the National Library of Madrid and the Orihuela Cathedral, Valencia. He composed more than seventy pieces of sacred music (oratories, psalms, Holy Week lamentations) and sonatas and fugues for organ, plus a string quartet.

His well-known Organ Sonata de Primo Tono has been acclaimed as an example of the Age of Romanticism. In Béjar, there is a square in honor of this illustrious citizen.

== Selected works ==
- Ave Maris stella - (4 and 8 voices)
- Cantábile para órgano al alzar en la misa
- El barón de Illescas
- Glaura y Coriolano (premiered at the Prince of Madrid Colosseum in 1792)
- Ofertorio
- Organ Sonata de Primo Tono (Para Trompeta Real)

== Modern editions ==
- José Lidón (1748-1827): La música para teclado, vol. I & II, edited by Dámaso García Fraile, Sociedad Española de Musicología (SEDEM), 2002.
