= Fritz Schmid =

Fritz Schmid may refer to:

- Fritz Schmid (singer) (born 1972), Austrian tenor
- Fritz Schmid (football manager) (born 1959), Swiss football manager
