= Julian Schmidt =

Julian Schmidt may refer to:

- Heinrich Julian Schmidt (1818–1886), German journalist and historian of literature
- Julian Schmidt (BMX rider) (born 1994), German BMX rider
- Julian Schmidt (politician) (born 1989), German politician
