= Andre Schmid =

Andre Schmid may refer to:

- Andre Schmid (soccer) (born 1983), former American soccer player
- Andre Schmid (academic), Canadian academic and author
- Andy Schmid (born 1983), Swiss handball player
