= Manuel Schmid =

Manuel Schmid may refer to:

- Manuel Schmid (footballer), Austrian footballer
- Manuel Schmid (skier), German alpine skier
