= Dominik Schmid =

Dominik Schmid may refer to:

- Dominik Schmid (handballer) (born 1989), Austrian handball player
- Dominik Schmid (footballer, born 1998), Swiss footballer

== See also ==
- Dominik Schmidt (born 1987), German footballer
