= Ulric Guttinguer =

French poet and novelist (1787–1866)

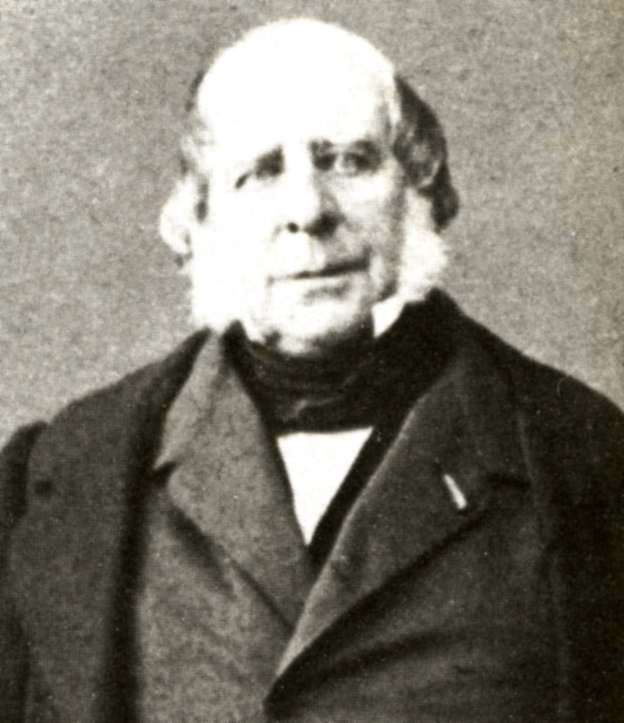
Ulric Guttinguer

Ulric Guttinguer (31 January 1787, in Rouen – 21 September 1866, in Paris) was a French poet and novelist.

== Works ==
- Goffin, ou les Mineurs sauvés (1812)
- Nadir, lettres orientales (1822)
- Le Bal, poème moderne, suivi de poésies (1824)
- Dithyrambe sur la mort de Lord Byron (1824)
- Mélanges poétiques (1824)
- Amour et opinion, histoire contemporaine (1827)
- Charles Sept à Jumiège; Édith, ou le Champ d'Hastings, poèmes suivis de poésies (1827)
- Arthur, Religion et Solitude (1836)
