= Willi Schmid =

Music critic, mistaken victim of the Night of the Long Knives (1893–1934)

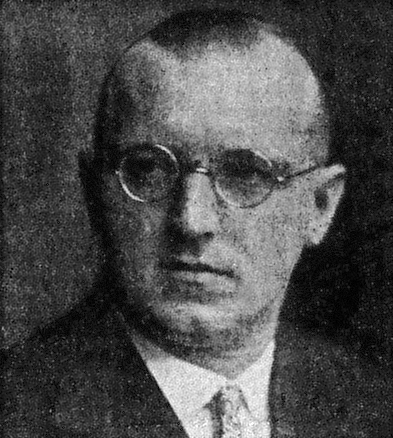
- Schmid in 1930
- Born: Wilhelm Eduard Schmid; April 12, 1893; German Empire
- Died: June 30, 1934 (aged 41); Nazi Germany
- Occupation: Music critic
- Known for: Being killed during the Night of the Long Knives by mistake
- Spouse: Kate Eva

Wilhelm Eduard Schmid (April 12, 1893 – June 30, 1934), better known as Willi Schmid, was a German music critic, and an accidental victim of the Night of the Long Knives in a case of mistaken identity.

== Biography ==
Born in 1893, Willi Schmid served in the Imperial Army in World War I, during which he was wounded in the stomach. A practising musician, he studied music under Christian Döbereiner, and founded the Munich Viol Quartet. He was also a well-respected music critic and wrote for the Münchener Neueste Nachrichten.

He was killed by the Nazi SS during the Night of the Long Knives because his name was similar to one of the intended targets, apparently either SA-Gruppenführer Wilhelm Schmid, or an associate of Otto Strasser named Ludwig Schmitt. William Shirer's account in The Rise and Fall of the Third Reich mentions that Schmid was playing the cello in his study, while his wife was preparing supper and his three children were playing in the adjacent room, when Nazi agents knocked on the door and took him away. His body was sent to his widow in a sealed casket four days later, with written instructions from the Gestapo not to open it under any circumstances.

Deputy Führer Rudolf Hess visited the family a few days later to express condolences for the mistake and offer his widow a pension. Schmid's widow, Kate Eva (née Tietz), later emigrated to the United States (with the help of Fritz Wiedemann, who was with Hess during his visit) and became a US citizen in 1944. She died there in 1985.

Schmid's friend, the philosopher Oswald Spengler, commemorated him in a poem and letter in Reden und Aufsätze (Collected Essays, published in 1937). Schmid's daughter Duscha went on to marry the Austro-American theoretical physicist Victor Weisskopf, and later wrote a book about her father, Willi Schmid: A Life in Germany.
