= Peter Schmid (archaeologist) =

German archaeologist (1926–2022)

Peter Schmid (29 November 1926 – 28 November 2022) was a German archaeologist. He spent his entire career at the Niedersächsisches Institut für historische Küstenforschung, of which he was director from 1973 to 1991.

== Life and career ==
Schmid was born in Hamburg on 29 November 1926. In 1944, while attending the gymnasium he was drafted into the Wehrmacht. He was subsequently made prisoner of war under British forces. From 1947 to 1948 he was an intern at the Niedersächsisches Institut für historische Küstenforschung (NIHK). From 1948 to 1954 he studied prehistory, early history, geography and geology at the University of Kiel, obtaining his PhD on 31 July 1954 with a dissertation titled: "Die vorrömische Eisenzeit in den Nordseemarschen". The next day he was excavation leader at the Feddersen Wierde. In 1954 Schmid returned to the NIHK to work as a scientific assistant. In 1963 he was named custodian, being promoted to chief custodian in 1969. In 1973 Schmid became director of the institute and in 1978 was named lead scientific director as well. He retired in 1991.

Schmid was elected a foreign member of the Royal Netherlands Academy of Arts and Sciences in 1982.

Schmid died on 28 November 2022, one day shy of his 96th birthday.
