= Anton Schmid (politician) =

German politician (1819–1893)

Anton Schmid (11 August 1819, Viechtach – 28 February 1893, Viechtach) was a German politician. He was a member of the Landtag of Bavaria from 1863 to 1869.
