= Anton Schmid (writer) =

Anton Franz Schmid (30 January 1787 – 3 July 1857) was an Austrian writer, librarian, music historian, musician, and music educator.

== Biography ==
Anton Schmid was born on 30 January 1787 in Pihel. His father, Andreas Schmid, was a brewer in the employ of Joseph, Count Kinsky. He was educated in music at the monastery in Česká Lípa where he began his studies in 1798. In 1804 he relocated to Prague where he worked as a music teacher and musician in the theatre orchestras.

In 1812 Schmid relocated to Vienna where he continued to teach until becoming a librarian at the Imperial Court Library in 1818. He worked there in a variety of capacities until his death; notably becoming head custodian in 1844. He was responsible for organizing the collection with its first handwritten catalogue. This became the basis for the modern Austrian National Library (founded 1920 as a restructuring of the former Imperial Court Library).

As a music historian, Schmid wrote on the history of printed music and 18th-century Viennese music. He also authored monographs on composers on Joseph Haydn, Niccolò Zingarelli, and Christoph Willibald Gluck. He contributed many articles to the music journal Caecilia which were published from 1842 to 1848. He wrote a bibliography of chess which was published in 1847.

Schmid died in Salzburg on 3 July 1857.
