= Walter Buch =

German jurist, SA and SS official during the Nazi era (1883–1949)

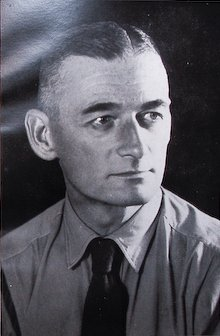
- Buch in 1933

Chairman of the Supreme Party Court (Note: Inquiry and Mediation Committee from 27 November 1927 to 1 January 1934)
- In office 27 November 1927 – 8 May 1945
- Führer: Adolf Hitler
- Preceded by: Bruno Heinemann
- Succeeded by: Office abolished

Personal details
- Born: 24 October 1883 Bruchsal, Grand Duchy of Baden, Germany
- Died: 12 September 1949 (aged 65) Schondorf am Ammersee, Bavaria, West Germany
- Resting place: Friedhof St. Johannes Baptist, Inning am Ammersee, Bavaria, Germany
- Party: Nazi Party
- Other political affiliations: German National People's Party
- Relatives: Martin Bormann (son-in-law); Martin Adolf Bormann (grandson)
- Profession: Army officer; jurist

Military service
- Allegiance: German Empire
- Branch/service: Imperial German Army
- Years of service: 1902–1918
- Rank: Major
- Unit: Infantry Regiment 114; Infantry Regiment 57; Infantry Regiment 112
- Battles/wars: World War I
- Awards: Iron Cross, 1st and 2nd Class

Walter Buch (24 October 1883 – 12 September 1949) was a German Nazi jurist who served as Chairman of the Uschla/Supreme Party Court from 1927 to 1945.

Buch was an early member of the Nazi Party, the SA, and the SS, a close associate of Adolf Hitler, and a participant in the Beer Hall Putsch. Buch was appointed chief judge of the Uschla in 1925, an important position for settling disputes within the party, despite having no formal legal training. Buch's insistence on prosecuting major Nazi officials for moral issues alienated Hitler and other powerful party members, causing his own power and influence to decline, serving as a figurehead from 1942 until the end of the World War II in 1945. Buch was classified as a major regime functionary in the denazification proceedings in 1948 and released from prison in 1949, committing suicide shortly afterwards.

== Early life and career ==
Walter Buch was born on 24 October 1883 in Bruchsal, Grand Duchy of Baden, the son of Hermann Buch, a Senate President at the Karlsruhe Regional Court. Buch graduated from the gymnasium in Konstanz in 1902 and entered the Imperial German Army as an officer cadet. He was promoted to Leutnant in 1904 and Oberleutnant in 1913. Buch served in the First World War, first as a training officer, and then as a company commander, earning the Iron Cross 1st and 2nd class. In March 1918, he became an instructor at the Döberitz military training area until September when he took up a position at the Prussian War Ministry in Berlin. In November 1918, upon the end of the war, Buch was released from the army as a major when he refused to swear allegiance to the new Weimar Republic. He then ran a chicken farm near Gernsbach and was active in the Baden Veterans' League. From 1919 to 1922, he was a member of the national-conservative German National People's Party (DNVP). He was also manager of the Baden branch of the Deutschvölkischer Schutz- und Trutzbund, the largest, most active, and most influential anti-semitic federation in post-war Germany

On 9 December 1922, Buch joined the Nazi Party (membership number 13,726), attracted by its virulent anti-semitism, and soon became the Ortsgruppenleiter (Local Group Leader) in Karlsruhe. On 1 January 1923, he joined the Sturmabteilung (SA), the paramilitary wing of the Nazi Party. By August of that year, he was leader of the SA in Franconia, which he had helped organise in Nuremberg . In mid-1923, Buch was recruited to the Stoßtrupp-Hitler (Shock Troop-Hitler), a small group of SA members formed for Nazi leader Adolf Hitler's personal protection, which would later evolve into the Schutzstaffel (SS).

Buch participated in the Beer Hall Putsch on 9 November 1923, eluding capture as many other Nazi leaders fled Germany to avoid prosecution. Buch came back to Munich as early as 13 November, sent by Hermann Göring – who had fled to Innsbruck in Austria – to ensure that the shaken Party troops' cohesion would not weaken. He built up ties with the now-outlawed SA groups, which could now only operate undercover, and briefly was charged with the leadership of the outlawed SA until arrested in February 1924. Buch maintained regular contact between Hitler, who was incarcerated in Landsberg Prison, and the illegal Nazi leadership in Austria. In the time that followed, Göring's fears that the party had broken up appear to be true until Hitler was released from Landsberg in December 1924. Hitler re-established the Nazi Party on 27 February 1925 and Buch rejoined (membership number 7,733), becoming the SA leader in Munich and serving in that capacity until November 1927.

== Chairman of the Supreme Party Court ==
The Investigation and Settlement Committee (Untersuchungs- und Schlichtungs-Ausschuss or Uschla) had been established in December 1925 by Hitler to settle intra-party problems and disputes using a court headquartered at the Brown House. On 27 November 1927, Hitler named Buch as Acting Chairman of this body, becoming permanent Chairman as of 1 January 1928. In addition to the national organization, there were lower level Uschla components at the Local and Gau levels of the Nazi Party. Their decisions could be appealed to the national Uschla which specifically had the right to cite “higher Party reasons” as the sole justification for refusing to accept a lower level decision. Hitler used this to wield almost total control over intra-Party disputes. Buch did not have any formal legal training and tried to avoid choosing professional lawyers as judges, preferring to rely on Alter Kämpfer because he trusted them to share his outlook for the party. The two other USCHLA members at the time of Buch's becoming chairman were Hans Frank and Ulrich Graf.

Following the Nazi seizure of power in 1933, the USCHLA was renamed the Supreme Party Court (Oberste Parteigericht) on 1 January 1934. Buch was retained as its chairman and also given the title of Supreme Party Judge (Oberster Parteirichter). The Court was empowered to conduct investigations, render judgments and take disciplinary actions against Nazi Party members. It could only impose sanctions that affected the accused's relationship with the Party, with punishments ranging from reprimand, to dismissal from Party offices and to the most extreme punishment, expulsion from the Party. If a case involved any criminal activity, the Court would refer the case to the criminal courts for action. Any pronouncements of the Supreme Party Court were non-binding on the criminal courts and needed the concurrence of Hitler to effectuate its decisions, which at times he refused to grant.

In 1934, Buch described the importance of Party tribunals thus:

The Party tribunals always have themselves to consider as the iron fasteners that hold together the proud building of the Nazi Party, which political leaders and SA leaders have built up. Saving it from cracks and shocks is the Party tribunals' grandest task. The Party magistrates are bound only to their National Socialist conscience, and are no political leader's subordinates, and they are subject only to the Führer.

Buch supported the purge of the SA's leadership following the Night of the Long Knives in June 1934, and acted in accordance by massing evidence against SA-Stabschef Ernst Röhm and his colleagues. Buch gathered complaints about homosexual activities among SA members and, at Hitler's behest, travelled to Bad Wiessee where he was present at Röhm's arrest. Buch felt that Röhm and his fellow SA leaders should have faced the Supreme Party Court, and was not informed of their summary executions until after the fact. However, Buch's courts at all levels were very active in the subsequent extensive purge of SA personnel throughout Nazi Germany. Buch reminded the tribunals that it was their duty to serve the Party, not “objective truth.” There are no accurate figures on the numbers of those expelled from the Party in the widespread purge, but they included members of the political organization as well as the SA.

=== Moral prosecutions ===
Buch believed that National Socialism should foster a revolution in morality as well as in politics, and he sought to use his position to spearhead a crusade against vice and corruption. Buch did not confine himself merely to ruling in internal Party disputes, but also had Party members investigated or sanctioned for personal moral failings. Buch felt that marital fidelity and family stability were cornerstones of National Socialism, often demanding punishment for moral offenses by senior Party leadership which earned him many powerful enemies. In addition, Hitler had no strong reservations about leaders’ private lives so long as they remained personally loyal and avoided open scandal. As a consequence, Buch's influence in the Party began to decline, as can be demonstrated by several high-profile cases against leading Party figures:

- In late 1935, Wilhelm Kube, the Gauleiter of Gau Kurmark, began an affair with his secretary, impregnated her, and began divorce proceedings against his wife. Buch was outraged by these actions and scolded Kube in writing for his adultery, and for tolerating similar behavior by his subordinates. The Supreme Party Court began an investigation into allegations of corruption, favoritism and nepotism in Kube's management of the Gau and issued a stern reprimand. However, Hitler was reluctant to remove one of his old comrades and summoned Buch to the Reich Chancellery for a personal rebuke on 14 November. Then, in April 1936, an anonymous letter charged that Buch's wife was half-Jewish, a very serious allegation. In the course of a Gestapo investigation, it came to light that the letter had been written by Kube in an attempt to get revenge on Buch. The Supreme Party Court issued an official reprimand of Kube in August 1936 and removed from all his posts. Only on Hitler's orders was Kube allowed to retain the rank and uniform of an “honorary” Gauleiter. Buch won a personal victory against Kube, but the whole sordid affair did nothing to restore him to Hitler's good graces.
- Buch was also responsible for the whitewashing of Party members' excesses during the nationwide Kristallnacht pogrom of 9 November 1938. Only 30 Party members were charged and most all had their cases dismissed or were given mild punishments. Buch's report, issued in February 1939, declared that the killings that had taken place were "committed on the basis of a vague or presumed order … but motivated by hatred against Jews … [or] motivated by a resolution suddenly formed in the excitement of the moment." He refused to hold the defendants responsible for following orders. However, his naming of Joseph Goebbels, the Reichsminister of Propaganda, as the instigator of the "vague order" further alienated Buch from the Nazi leadership.
- In early 1940, Buch began proceedings against Julius Streicher, the Gauleiter of Gau Franconia for behavior viewed as so irresponsible that he was embarrassing the party leadership. He was accused of keeping Jewish property seized after Kristallnacht, of immoral personal behavior including open adultery, and of spreading untrue stories about Hermann Göring – alleging that he was impotent and that his daughter Edda was conceived by artificial insemination. Streicher was brought before the Supreme Party Court and on 16 February 1940 was judged to be "unsuitable for leadership" and stripped of his party offices. Hitler contemplated overturning the verdict and removing “the old fool” Buch, considering Streicher one of his oldest and most loyal comrades. Hitler settled for permitting Streicher to retain the title of Gauleiter and to continue as the publisher of Der Stürmer. This episode further strained Buch's relationship with Hitler.
- In November 1941, Hitler dismissed Josef Wagner, the Gauleiter of Gau Westphalia-South, and ordered that he face the Supreme Party Court. Wagner was charged with "ideological deviation" by remaining in the Catholic Church and sending his children to a convent school. In addition, his wife objected to the marriage of their daughter to an SS member. Wagner defended himself ably and, in February 1942, the Court surprisingly exonerated him in what intended to be little more than a show trial. Hitler angrily refused to ratify the Court's decision and, responding to this high level rebuke, the Court was finally compelled to expel Wagner from the Party in October 1942.

After this latest episode Hitler resolved to act against Buch and, at the end of November 1942, Buch lost what powers still remained to him. Hitler decreed that the Court could no longer try cases involving "ideological issues". In addition, Gauleiters were authorized to serve as courts of appeal for Party courts at the Gau level, and Hitler delegated the power of confirming the Supreme Party Court's decisions to Martin Bormann, the Chief of the Nazi Party Chancellery. Coincidentally, Bormann was married to Buch's eldest daughter Gerda, but the two were not on good terms. Bormann from then on at times nullified sentences pronounced by the Buch's Court and at other times interfered with its deliberations, indicating what decision he expected of it. Buch tried to maintain his independence of action but eventually refused to preside over Court sessions and effectively withdrew from his position. In post-war interrogations, he claimed to have offered to resign and join the army several times during the Second World War, but that his offers were never accepted.

== Other positions ==
Apart from his leadership of the Supreme Party Court, Buch held several other high level positions in the Nazi Party and government. On 20 May 1928, Buch was elected from electoral constituency 24 (Upper Bavaria-Swabia) as one of the first 12 Nazi Party deputies to the Reichstag. He would subsequently be elected four more times from the Nazi Party electoral list through the elections of March 1933. He then represented constituencies 15 (East Hanover) at the election of November 1933 and 29 (Leipzig) at the elections of March 1936 and April 1938. He served continuously until the end of the Nazi regime. Buch was also the leader of the Youth Office (Jugendamt) in the Party's national leadership (Reichsleitung) from June 1930 until 30 October 1931, when he was succeeded by Baldur von Schirach. On 18 December 1931, Buch was promoted to SA-Gruppenführer. He also served for a time up to 1933 as an editor at the Party newspaper Völkische Beobachter. On 2 June 1933, he was appointed by Hitler as a Reichsleiter, the second highest political rank in the Nazi Party. On 1 July 1933, Buch joined the SS and became an honorary leader (Ehrenführer) with the rank of SS-Gruppenführer. On 9 November 1934, he would be promoted to SS-Obergruppenführer. On 1 April 1936, he was appointed to the staff of Heinrich Himmler, the Reichsführer-SS. On 3 October 1934, he was made a member of the Academy for German Law.

== Imprisonment and suicide ==
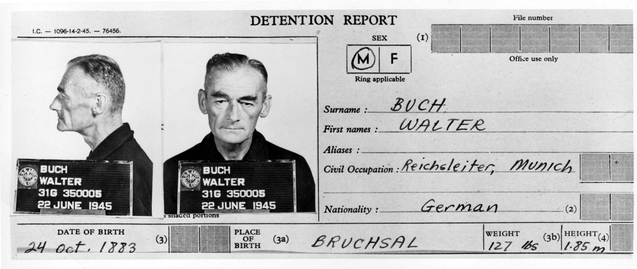
Detention report and mug shots of Walter Buch

On 30 April 1945, near the end of the war in Europe, Buch was arrested by American forces and held at Camp Ashcan in Luxembourg until August. He was subjected to numerous interrogations by the American secret service and also called as a witness at the Nuremberg trials. He was categorized as a "major offender" by a denazification court on 3 July 1948 and sentenced to five years in a labor camp. An appeal on 29 July 1949 reaffirmed his status as a major offender and the confiscation of all his assets, but reduced his sentence to three and a half years, and he was released on the basis of time served.

On 12 September 1949, a few weeks after his release from prison, Buch ended his own life by slitting his wrists and throwing himself into the Ammersee. (Langener Zeitung, 16 September 1949)

== Decorations and awards ==
- Iron Cross 2nd Class
- Iron Cross 1st Class
- Nuremberg Party Day Badge, 1929
- Honour Chevron for the Old Guard, February 1934
- The Honour Cross of the World War 1914/1918 with Swords, 1934
- Coburg Badge, 1935
- Blood Order (Commemorative Medal of the 9th of November 1923)

== Bibliography ==
- Bayerische Landesbibliothek. "Julius Streicher".
- Lang, Jochen von (1979). The Secretary. Martin Bormann: The Man Who Manipulated Hitler. New York: Random House. ISBN 978-0-394-50321-9.
- Miller, Michael (2006). Leaders of the SS and German Police, Vol. 1. San Jose, California: R. James Bender. ISBN 978-93-297-0037-2.
- Miller, Michael D.; Schulz, Andreas (2017). Gauleiter: The Regional Leaders of the Nazi Party and Their Deputies, 1925-1945. Vol. 2 (Georg Joel - Dr. Bernhard Rust). R. James Bender Publishing. ISBN 978-1-932970-32-6.
- Miller, Michael D.; Schulz, Andreas (2015). Leaders of the Storm Troops, Volume 1. Solihull, England: Helion & Company. ISBN 978-1-909982-87-1.
- Orlow, Dietrich (1973). The History of the Nazi Party: 1933-1945. University of Pittsburgh Press. ISBN 0-822-9-3253-9.
