= Wilhelm Grimm (politician) =

German Nazi official and alleged 20 July plotter (1889–1944)

Chairman of the Second Chamber, Investigation and Mediation Committee (USCHLA) Later, Supreme Party Court
- In office 1 June 1932 – 9 March 1939
- Preceded by: Office established
- Succeeded by: Office abolished

Reichsleiter
- In office 2 June 1933 – 9 March 1939

Gauleiter of Middle Franconia-West
- In office 1 October 1928 – 1 March 1929

Personal details
- Born: 31 December 1889 Hof, German Empire
- Died: 21 July 1944 (aged 54) Coswig, Nazi Germany
- Resting place: Schliersee, Bavaria, Germany
- Party: Nazi Party
- Other political affiliations: German Socialist Party
- Occupation: Soldier; Civil Servant

Military service
- Allegiance: German Empire; Nazi Germany
- Branch/service: Imperial German Army; German Army
- Years of service: 1906–1919; 1941–1943
- Rank: Leutnant; Hauptmann
- Unit: 14th Royal Bavarian Infantry Regiment
- Battles/wars: World War I World War II
- Awards: Iron Cross, 2nd class

Wilhelm Grimm (31 December 1889 – 21 July 1944) was a high-ranking member of the Nazi Party who served as a leader of the internal Party Investigation and Mediation Committee. He was killed as a result of his supposed involvement in the 20 July 1944 plot to assassinate Adolf Hitler.

== Early years ==
After completing Volksschule, Grimm attended the non-commissioned officers' school in Fürstenfeldbruck from 1906 to 1909, and then entered the 14th Royal Bavarian Infantry Regiment. He took part in the First World War, serving in the field from 1914 to 1917 and then in staff positions. He was awarded the Iron Cross, 2nd class, and was released into civilian life with the rank of Leutnant in October 1919.

When discharged, he worked in the Ansbach pension office as senior secretary, was promoted to administrative inspector in 1927 and worked as a propagandist and organizer for the Deutschvölkischer Schutz- und Trutzbund in Middle Franconia. In 1920 Grimm joined the antisemitic German Socialist Party, of which Julius Streicher was a member. This party merged with the Nazis in 1922 and Grimm received membership number 10,134.

== Nazi career ==
When the Nazi Party was re-established after being outlawed in the aftermath of the Beer Hall Putsch, Grimm rejoined on 27 February 1925. He was the Party's founding Ortsgruppenleiter (Local Group Leader) in Ansbach, and in 1926 advanced to Kreisleiter (County Leader). In May 1928 he was elected to the Bavarian Landtag, serving until 1933. From 1 October 1928 to 1 March 1929 he was the Gauleiter for Middle Franconia-West. However, when his Gau was merged with Streicher’s neighboring Gau (Nuremberg-Fürth) he became Deputy Gauleiter for Middle Franconia under Streicher.

In February 1932, Grimm was made an Associate Judge of USCHLA, the Nazi Party's investigative and mediation committee, a body that regulated internal party disputes. In January 1934, its name was changed to Oberstes Parteigericht (Supreme Party Court) though it was more of an arbitration and mediation organization, rather than a strictly legal one. From 1 June 1932 Grimm was Chairman of the Second Chamber of USCHLA. In November 1933, he was elected to the Reichstag for electoral constituency 26, Franconia, and would serve there until his death. On 3 June 1933 he was appointed Reichsleiter, the second highest rank in the Nazi Party.

Grimm joined the Schutzstaffel (SS) (membership number 199,823) on 18 October 1933 with the rank of SS-Oberführer. He was promoted to SS-Brigadeführer on 24 December and to SS-Gruppenführer on 27 January 1934. He served on the staff of Reichsführer-SS Heinrich Himmler from April 1936. Grimm retired from the Supreme Party Court on 9 March 1939. Beginning in August 1941, he served in the German army on the Eastern Front as a battalion commander with the rank of Hauptmann before returning to Germany in 1943 due to illness. He resumed his duties in Himmler's office, working on issues related to the war economy.

== Death ==
According to documents released by The Wilson Center in 2019, Grimm was implicated in the 20 July 1944 plot to assassinate Hitler, and was killed the next day in reprisal. The document further states that, to protect the reputation of the SS, his cause of death was reported as a car accident and he was given an "honorable burial".

== Bibliography ==
- Miller, Michael D.; Schulz, Andreas (2012). Gauleiter: The Regional Leaders of the Nazi Party and Their Deputies, 1925-1945. Vol. I (Herbert Albrecht - H. Wilhelm Hüttmann). R. James Bender Publishing. ISBN 978-1-932970-21-0.
- Orlow, Dietrich (1969). The History of the Nazi Party: 1919–1933. University of Pittsburgh Press. ISBN 0-8229-3183-4.
