= Uschla/Supreme Party Court =

Nazi Party judicial tribunal

Investigation and Settlement Committee (Uschla) Supreme Party Court (from 1 January 1934)
- Untersuchung und Schlichtungs-Ausschuss; Oberstes Parteigericht (from 1 January 1934)
- Formation: 21 August 1925
- Dissolved: 8 May 1945
- Type: Party judicial tribunal
- Headquarters: Karolinenplatz 4, Munich
- Location: Nazi Germany
- Chairman/ Supreme Party Judge: Walter Buch, 1927-1945
- Chairman: Bruno Heinemann, 1925-1927
- Parent organization: Nazi Party

The Uschla (Note: Sometimes rendered in all capital letters as USCHLA.) (Untersuchung und Schlichtungs-Ausschuss, roughly translated as the Investigation and Settlement Committee (Note: An alternate translation is Inquiry and Settlement Tribunal; "Settlement" in this context is sometimes translated as "Arbitration," "Mediation" or "Conciliation.")) was an internal Nazi Party tribunal (Note: While sometimes called a "court," the Uschla was more in the nature of an arbitration or mediation board, since its true function was not to determine which party had the correct legal view or position in a dispute (as does a court of law), but rather to resolve disputes promptly and effectively, so that internecine battles would not adversely affect the public's (or the general party membership's) perception of the NSDAP.) that was established by Adolf Hitler in 1925 to settle intra-party problems and disputes. After the Nazi seizure of power, the Uschla was renamed the Supreme Party Court (Oberstes Parteigericht) in January 1934, under which title it functioned throughout the remainder of the Nazi regime until May 1945.

== Uschla ==
=== Origins ===
The Uschla had its origins at the very beginnings of the Nazi Party in the Party statutes (satzung) of 29 July 1921 when Hitler established two separate committees for resolving conflicts in the Party. Each was to consist of a chairman and two members. The first was the Investigation Committee, headed by himself, and the second was the Settlement Committee, headed by Party cofounder Anton Drexler.

These components existed until the Party was banned in the wake of the Beer Hall Putsch in November 1923. The Party was reestablished on 27 February 1925 and Hitler subsequently resurrected these two committees in the Party statutes of 21 August 1925. They were soon combined into a unified Investigation and Settlement Committee, and its organization and functions were described in the subsequent Party statutes of 22 May 1926.

=== Functions ===
One task of the new body was the examination of the validity of applications by prospective Party members. In examining membership applications, the Uschla applied the Nazi Party's racial policies in excluding Jews, along with Freemasons or anyone with communist or socialist ties. It specifically excluded anyone with any trace of Jewish blood dating back to 1800, or anyone having marriage ties to such persons.

Another function was conducting expulsion procedures for Party members. Expulsion offenses were broadly defined and members could be removed for a variety of vague reasons, including "disgraceful actions" and any "general offense" that might be judged to be injurious to the Party. This gave the committee wide latitude to exclude anyone the political leadership opposed. Once excluded, it was rare for anyone to be readmitted to the Party.

The committee was also charged with the settlement of internal disputes and feuds among Party members. The Uschla was patterned on the former honor courts of the German Imperial Army, and Party members could appeal to it to absolve them of any unjustified attacks on their character leveled by a comrade. Examples of the types of complaints handled were slander, adultery, homosexuality, drunkenness and embezzlement of Party funds. The Party leadership intended that such issues be handled not in the law courts where they would be a matter of public record, but in the Party tribunal whose members were sworn to secrecy. This had the advantage of avoiding public scandal and preserving the Party's image of respectability.

=== Organizational structure ===
When the Uschla first convened in January 1926, Hitler envisioned it at the top of a network of Party tribunals at the regional and local levels. Therefore, beginning in July 1926, Uschla committees began to be formed at lower Party levels. A three-level system was established which was expanded to a four-level system in 1931.

At the national level, the Reichs-Uschla presided at Karolinenplatz 4 in Munich, the city where the Nazi Party had its origins and its headquarters. Immediately below this level was the Gau-Uschla, a regional level body with one such tribunal for each Gau. (Note: The Nazi Party was divided into approximately 30 Gau, or geographic divisions for administrative purposes in 1926. There would eventually be 43 Gaue by 1941.) The lowest level of tribunal, the Orts-Uschla was based in the Ortsgruppe, or local branch organization. A typical Gau might contain approximately 100 Orts-Uschlas. Subordinate level Uschlas began to be organized in summer 1926 and were largely complete by October 1930. In 1931, the Kreis-Uschla level was established to function at the kreis ('county') level between the Orts-Uschla and the Gau-Uschla.

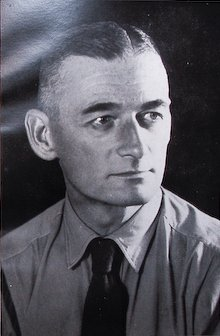
Walter Buch Chairman of Uschla (1927-1933) Supreme Party Judge (1933-1945)

=== Personnel ===
The first Chairman of the Reichs-Uschla was former Reichswehr Generalleutnant Bruno Heinemann (de), appointed 1 December 1925. As a former high-ranking military officer, he had the image Hitler was looking for in his "honor court." However, he was not quite the rubber stamp that Hitler envisioned for this role and, in fact, Heinemann sometimes expressed disagreement with Hitler in writing. Additionally, at age 68 he did not command the respect of younger Party leaders. He was an ill fit for the task of conciliating the many petty quarrels among Party members and could not enforce his judgments without Hitler's support. He failed to grasp the real purpose of the tribunal, namely, to settle disputes so as to keep them quiet, rather than to achieve substantive justice between the disputants or to enforce a strict moral code.

Accordingly, Hitler decided to replace Heinemann and, on 27 November 1927, after frequent illness-related absences, Heinemann was replaced as chairman in an acting capacity with the more politically astute Walter Buch, a former Reichswehr Major but also a former member of Hitler's personal bodyguard unit, the Stoßtrupp-Hitler, who was wholeheartedly devoted to Hitler. On 2 January 1928, it was announced that Heinemann had requested to be relieved of his duties and Buch was named permanent chairman. During Heinemann's tenure, he succeeded in firmly establishing the Uschla as the Party's central control mechanism. It is estimated that it handled at least 200 cases between January 1926 and November 1927.

Working under Heinemann as "assessors" (beisitzer), had been Karl Ostberg who had served with Hitler as a dispatch-runner in the First World War and Ulrich Graf, like Buch also a member of Hitler's bodyguard. Ostberg, however, was replaced around the same time as Heinemann with Hitler's personal lawyer, Hans Frank. Hitler now had a tribunal composed entirely of close and highly trusted colleagues.

On 18 December 1930, Wilhelm von Holzschuher joined the Uschla as Deputy to Chairman Buch. In January 1932, the continued increased growth in Party membership necessitated adding an additional assessor, Wilhelm Grimm. In June 1932, to improve the tribunal's efficiency in handling an ever increasing workload, it was divided into three chambers, headed by Buch, Holzschuher and Grimm, each having its own separate geographical jurisdiction.

=== Procedures ===
Though theoretically independent judicial review boards, the Uschlas were highly dependent on and controlled by the Party political leaders at each level. The Uschlas could not open investigations on their own motion. The political leaders were responsible for calling the Uschlas into session, for signing their decrees for disciplinary action and for carrying out the decrees. Most importantly, they had the power to appoint and remove the Uschla members. This gave the political leaders a large measure of control which some used to bully and intimidate the Uschla members into findings that the political leaders desired. Hitler found the Reichs-Uschla a very advantageous control mechanism, as he could sway or influence their actions by his power of appointment while at the same time diverting any unpopular decisions away from himself.

At the beginning, the Uschlas operated rather haphazardly, without a detailed set of guidelines. Although some Uschla staff possessed law degrees, tribunal members were not required to be lawyers, or even have formal legal training. Affidavits or other written testimony was usually gathered, but personal interrogations and formal hearings rarely occurred. In August 1929 the first major Party directive (richtlinien) for Uschla processes was issued. It set out procedures for a preliminary inquiry to gather oral and written testimony. This was followed by a trial which involved a closed meeting with the opposing parties (who did not have legal counsel) and their witnesses, interrogation of the defendant and witnesses by the tribunal and questioning of the witnesses by both the plaintiff and the defendant. After consultation, the tribunal rendered its verdict. The directive also established appeal rights with defendants able to appeal adverse decisions to the next higher level. The Reichs-Uschla maintained ultimate decision-making authority, and had the exclusive right to cite "higher Party reasons" (paralleling "reasons of State" in the civil courts) as justification for not accepting a lower panel decision.

The Uschla could originally render four possible judgments. First, it could declare itself incompetent to take up a case on a jurisdictional basis. If it did take the case, it could find an acquittal, a finding of guilty with a warning or a finding of guilty with expulsion from the Party. An April 1931 directive added ordering a reprimand by the defendant's political leader, which included banning the holding of a Party office or appearing as a speaker for the movement.

=== SA Jurisdictional Issue ===
Reflecting the ongoing tension between the Party's political organization and its paramilitary wing, the Sturmabteilung (SA), jurisdictional issues plagued the Uschla for years. The SA leadership sought maximum autonomy within the movement, and resented any infringement upon its freedom of action. The natural antagonism between the two loci of power peaked when the Uschla attempted to subject SA men to its jurisdiction.

A case in January 1930 highlighted the jurisdictional issue between the two groups. The Plauen Orts-Uschla in Gau Saxony ordered the expulsion of an SA man, but his commander disagreed with the decision and claimed that the tribunal had no jurisdiction over SA men performing their functions in the line of duty. Buch conceded that the Uschla was not competent to handle complaints "between SA men in SA cases" but this vague term remained officially undefined. The SA then issued its own instructional memorandum in May 1930, stipulating that the Uschlas lacked jurisdiction over "SA affairs" and could only intervene in those affairs if (a) the SA man's conduct did serious harm to the interests of the NSDAP and (b) his commanding officer agreed that serious harm had been done. This was intended to make Uschla jurisdiction, in effect, entirely contingent upon the consent of the SA commander. It also left the undefined term "SA affairs" open to interpretation and argument, so little progress in settling the jurisdictional squabble resulted and the memorandum was repealed in December 1930.

A further Party directive issued 15 April 1931 officially outlined the jurisdiction between the Uschlas and the SA and SS members, providing them with considerable protections. Disputes concerning purely "SA and SS affairs" were conceded to be the preserve of each paramilitary group. Only high ranking SA or SS officers were permitted to order the opening of Uschla proceedings against men under their command. In addition, at least one member of the reviewing tribunal had to be an SA or SS man. These safeguards shielded SA and SS members from automatic, direct accountability to the Uschlas and tended to reinforce the independence of the paramilitary groups. Despite this, many in the SA remained dissatisfied; the fact that the latest directive originated from the political organization rather than from the SA command structure heightened resentment that the SA was being subjected to the Uschlas.

In a new Reichs-Uschla directive of 1 January 1933, all Uschla members were designated autonomous Party officials not subject to being removed against their will by their political leaders. The Uschlas now could investigate all members of the political organization and the SA. This directive also served to enhance the power and prestige of the tribunals. It officially designated them as "courts of honor" and even created a Special Court of Honor (Besonderer Ehrenhof) under the chairmanship of Buch with jurisdiction over all of the Reichsleitung ('Reich leadership'). Its rulings were binding on all NSDAP members and there was no appeal against its findings. Gau-Uschla chairmen were entitled to the rank and service uniform of a Deputy Gauleiter and the Reichs-Uschla Chairman to that of a department head of the Reichsleitung.

A final relevant provision, contained in a directive of 17 February 1934, stipulated that before a proceeding against an SA or SS man was opened, his commanding officer was to be "notified" and given the opportunity to defend his subordinate at the trial. The provision requiring that at least one SA or SS man be a member of the tribunal remained in effect. Thus the paramilitary organizations, though still subject to jurisdiction by the Uschlas, possessed special protections not available to other Party members.

== Supreme Party Court ==
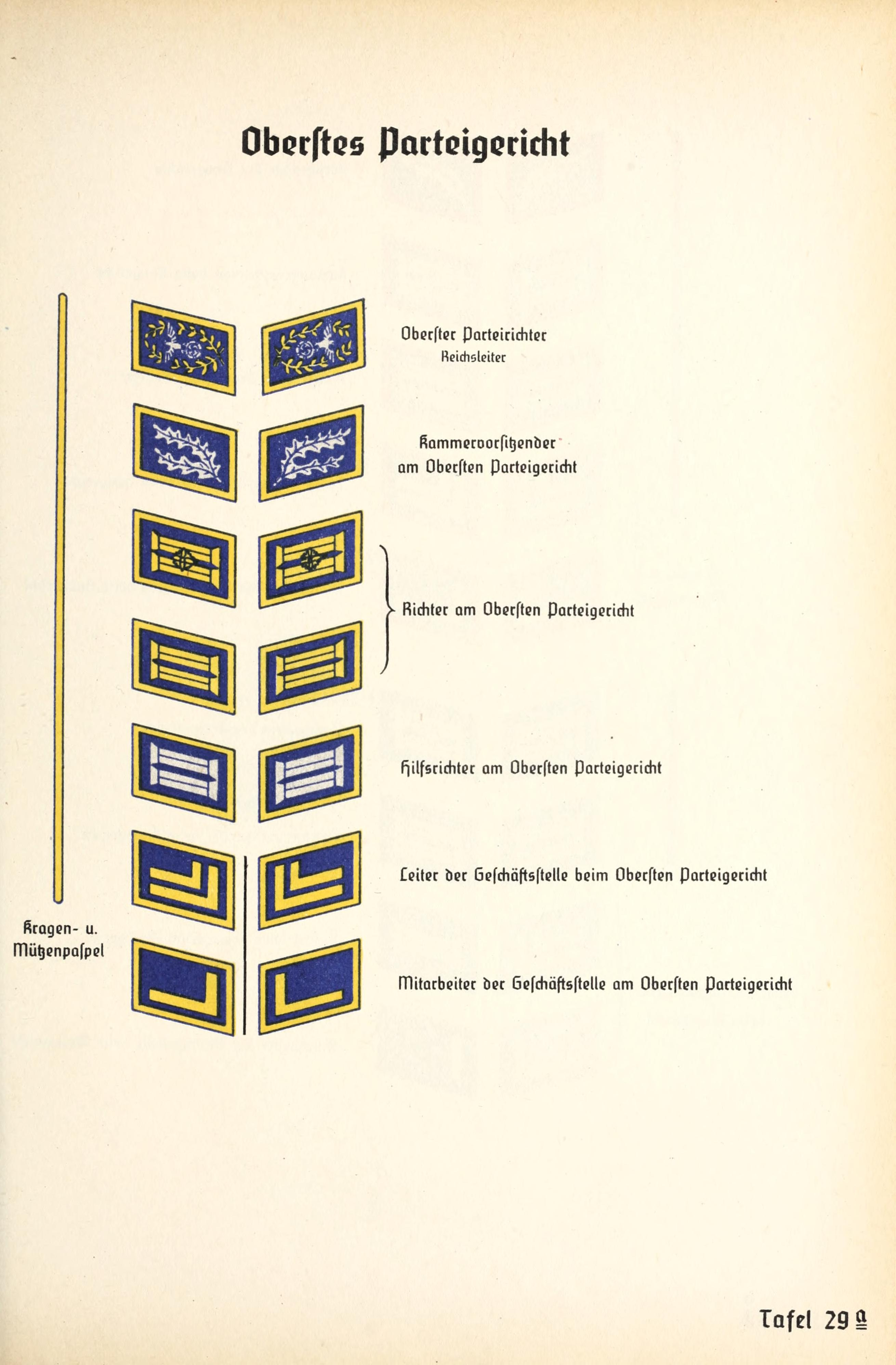
Rank insignia of the Oberstes Parteigericht

=== Establishment ===
After the Nazi seizure of power of 30 January 1933, the Uschlas continued to experience an increase their importance and status. On 2 June 1933, Buch and Grimm were named NSDAP Reichsleiters ('Reich Leaders'), the second-highest political rank in the Nazi Party. On 9 December 1933, a new directive changed the name of the Uschlas to Parteigerichte ('Party courts'). Buch was granted the title of Supreme Party Judge (Oberster Parteirichter). The existing four-level organization was retained. The Reichs-Uschla was renamed the Oberstes Parteigericht ('Supreme Party Court') overseeing the Gaugerichte, Kreisgerichte and Ortsgerichte.

Effective 1 December 1933, the Party courts were established as official legal institutions of the State by the "Act for Securing the Unity of the Party and State." The Act increased the powers of the courts, whereas any crime committed against the Party now was considered a crime against the State. The courts now also could impose detention or imprisonment as punishment.

The Act authorized the Party courts to punish government employees who were Party members. This exposed them to a type of double jeopardy, by which Party members expelled or punished by the Party Court would almost automatically face removal from their civil service position. Conversely, Party members convicted in the State courts could be brought before the Party courts, tried for "bringing injury to the Party" and expelled from the NSDAP. Though the Party courts very rarely issued formal decisions ordering arrest and imprisonment, they worked closely with the State authorities and, following expulsion from the Party, arrest and State trial soon followed.

On 1 January 1934, reorganization at the Supreme Party Court divided it into 2 chambers and Holzschuher left the court. The First Chamber, headed by Buch, had Frank and Ludwig Schneider as associates and dealt with the southern and western Gaue. The Second Chamber was headed by Grimm with Graf and Konrad Hofer as associates and had jurisdiction of the northern and eastern Gaue.

On 17 February 1934, a new directive more closely aligned the court's process with criminal procedures. The party courts were viewed as a separate branch of the State courts, and they were authorized to obtain confidential information from the police and State courts. The trials of many Gaue and Kreis courts even took place in State courthouses. The directive also ordered the subordinate Gaue and Kreis courts to be divided into two chambers on the model of the Supreme Party Court, with each chamber to consist of a chairman, two judges and two alternate judges. The Party court system was estimated to consist of some 2,500 functionaries at this time.

In personnel changes, Hans Frank left the Court and Walter Knop was appointed at the end of 1934. Knop subsequently succeeded Buch as Chairman of the First Chamber on 1 January 1936, though Buch remained overall head of the Court as Supreme Party Judge. Wilhelm Grimm left the Court in March 1939.

=== Role in the SA purge ===
The longstanding conflict with the SA came to a dramatic conclusion during the Night of the Long Knives on 30 June 1934 when the leadership of the SA was effectively decapitated and Hitler tightened his control over the entire movement. Having amassed evidence against SA-Stabschef Ernst Röhm and his colleagues by gathering complaints about homosexual activities among SA members, Buch was a longtime opponent of Röhm's. Nonetheless, Buch felt that Röhm and his fellow SA leaders should have faced charges before the Supreme Party Court, and he was not informed of their summary executions until after the fact. However, Buch's courts at all levels were very active in the subsequent extensive purge of SA personnel throughout the Reich. Though no accurate figures exist as to the numbers expelled from the Party in the widespread purge, they included members of the political organization as well as the SA.

=== Role in the Kristallnacht Cover-up ===
Following the massive anti-Jewish pogrom of 9–10 November 1938 known as Kristallnacht, the Supreme Party Court's two Chambers each convened in a Sondersenat ('Special Senate') and conducted sixteen trials involving some thirty of the perpetrators, mainly SA men, between 20 December 1938 and 9 February 1939. Of these, 26 were either acquitted or given a "warning," the mildest punishment allowable. This effectively whitewashed the vast majority of the violent crimes committed, including looting, assault, arson and the murder of 21 Jews. The four defendants that did receive the harsher punishment of expulsion from the Party were those who had committed sexual crimes such as rape or indecent assault involving Jewish women, thus violating the Nazi prohibition against intermingling of the races; they were also tried in State court and imprisoned. In addition, the Court wrote a report to the Reich Ministry of Justice recommending that no State investigations or criminal trials be held for those who had been acquitted.

=== Decline of the Supreme Party Court ===
After the trial against Josef Wagner, Gauleiter of Gau Westphalia-South, in which the Supreme Party Court, against Hitler's wishes, found no formal legal grounds for a conviction, the power of the Court was significantly reduced. Hitler ordered Buch to reverse the decision and expel Wagner, which he did in October 1942. Schneider, who had presided at the trial, was removed from the Court. Furthermore, Buch was ordered to remove all judges who had formal judicial experience and replace them with loyal Party comrades who could be trusted to arrive at the "correct" decisions.

On 21 November 1942, a new directive ordered that every Supreme Party Court judgment had to be confirmed by the Party Chancellery, which was headed by Secretary to the Führer Martin Bormann. Without his approval and co-signature, any decision was invalid and unenforceable. Not only could Bormann nullify sentences imposed by the Court, but he interfered with their independence by informing the Court what decisions were expected in individual cases. Buch tried to maintain the independence of the Court but, frustrated by these developments, refused to preside in Court sessions and effectively withdrew from the tribunal. In August 1944, Bormann ordered almost all party judicial proceedings at every level, except for appeals, suspended to release personnel for the war effort. Disciplinary actions were assigned to the political leaders, to be quickly executed in summary fashion.

At the fall of the Nazi regime in May 1945, the Party courts were abolished. Buch, who had headed them since 1927, was arrested and tried in the denazification process. Found to be a "major offender", he was incarcerated until 29 July 1949 and committed suicide on 12 September of that year.

== Sources ==
- Grant, Thomas D. (2004). Stormtroopers and Crisis in the Nazi Movement: Activism, Ideology and Dissolution. London; New York: Routledge. ISBN 978-0415196024.
- McKale, Donald M. (1974). The Nazi Party Courts: Hitler's Management of Conflict in His Movement, 1921-1945. University Press of Kansas. ISBN 0-7006-0122-8.
- Miller, Michael D.; Schulz, Andreas (2015). Leaders of the Storm Troops. Vol. 1. Solihull, England: Helion & Company. ISBN 978-1-909982-87-1.
- Orlow, Dietrich (1969). The History of the Nazi Party: 1919-1933. University of Pittsburgh Press. ISBN 0-8229-3183-4.
- Orlow, Dietrich (1973). The History of the Nazi Party: 1933-1945. University of Pittsburgh Press. ISBN 0-822-9-3253-9.
- Shirer, William Lawrence (1960), The Rise and Fall of the Third Reich: A History of Nazi Germany, New York City: Simon & Schuster, ASIN B0766DKDLR, LCCN 60006729, OCLC 1286630, OL 5794925M, Wikidata Q138029595
- Williams, Max (2015). SS Elite: The Senior Leaders of Hitler's Praetorian Guard. Vol. I. Fonthill Media LLC. ISBN 978-1-78155-433-3.
