= Herbert Rosendorfer =

German writer (1934–2012)

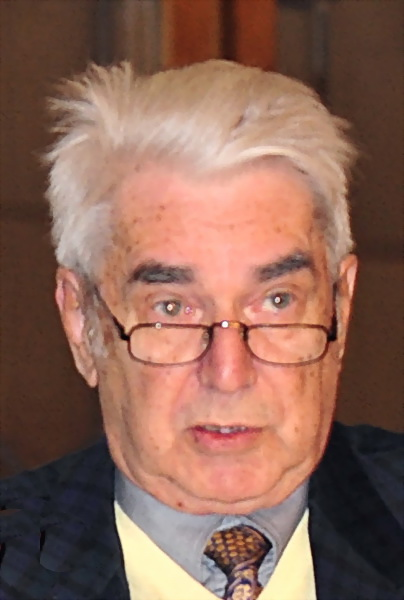
- Herbert Rosendorfer, 2009
- Born: February 19, 1934; Bolzano
- Died: September 20, 2012 (aged 78); Eppan, South Tyrol
- Occupations: Jurist, writer, historian, composer
- Known for: Judge (High Court of Appeal in Naumburg); Honorary professor of the history of Bavarian literature (LMU Munich)

Herbert Rosendorfer (19 February 1934, in Bolzano – 20 September 2012, in Eppan, South Tyrol) was a German jurist, writer, historian, and composer.

== Biography ==
Herbert Rosendorfer was born in the village of Gries (currently in the province of Bolzano) in the South Tyrol. From 1939 to 1943, he lived in Munich. In 1943, he was evacuated to Kitzbühel, returning to Munich five years later.

After finishing school, Rosendorfer spent a year studying painting at the Academy of Fine Arts, Munich but then entered the Faculty of Law at LMU Munich.

Between 1967 and 1993, Rosendorfer served as a judge in Munich, after which he was a Justice at the High Court of Appeal in Naumburg. Also, from 1990, he was an honorary professor of the history of Bavarian literature at LMU Munich.

Following his retirement, he lived in Eppan, in the South Tyrol, till his death on 20 September 2012.

== Awards and distinctions ==
Rosendorfer was a member of the Bavarian Academy of Fine Arts, as well as the Academy of Sciences and Literature (Akademie der Wissenschaften und der Literatur) in Mainz. He received the 1977 Toucan Prize, the 1991 Ernst Hoferichter Award, the 1992 Upper Bavarian Cultural Prize, the 1999 Jean-Paul Prize, and the 2010 Corine Literature Prize for his lifetime achievements.

He was honoured with the Order of Merit, First Class (1996), the Austrian Cross of Honour for Science and Art, 1st class and the Bavarian Order of Merit in 2004.

== Works ==
Rosendorfer penned numerous novels and short stories, as well as plays, TV scripts, historical research, and treatises and guides on music. Some of his works belong in the genre of fantasy; even in his works of realism and history, he often used elements of satire and the grotesque.

He was a painter and composer, and combined his passion for literature and music in several librettos for the opera.

=== Books ===
The following books are available in English translation from Dedalus Books.

- The Architect of Ruins. Trans. Mike Mitchell. Dedalus. 2011. p. 368. ISBN 978-1903517796. (Original title - Der Ruinenbaumeister (1969))
- Stephanie. Trans. Mike Mitchell. 1995. p. 160. ISBN 978-1873982174. (Original title - Stephanie und das vorige Leben (1977))
- Letters Back to Ancient China. Trans. Mike Mitchell. Dedalus. 2006. p. 274. ISBN 978-1903517390. (Original title - Briefe in die chinesische Vergangenheit (1983))
- Grand Solo for Anton. Trans. Mike Mitchell. Dedalus. 2007. p. 240. ISBN 978-1903517451. (Original title - Großes Solo für Anton (1976))

Another title was published in English translation by Martin Secker & Warburg in 1991.

- The Night of the Amazons. Trans, Ian Mitchell (original title - Nacht der Amazonen (1989))

=== Music ===
- Two Marches, opus 7 for piano with four hands, Munich, 1999
- Musical Moments, opus 8a for flute and piano, Munich, 2000
- Musical Moments, opus 8b for oboe and piano, Munich, 2000
- Glory and Honour to the city of Passau, opus 9 for oboe (flute), clarinet and bassoon, Munich, 2000
- Two songs, opus 10 No. 1 and 2 for mezzo-soprano and chamber orchestra, Munich, 2000
- The Twelve Apostles of Rohrdorf; first performed December 1, 2005 at the Benedictine school in Ettal
- Concerto in D major for oboe and chamber orchestra, opus 14, 2008.
