= Night of the Amazons =

Annual Nazi propaganda event (1936-1939)

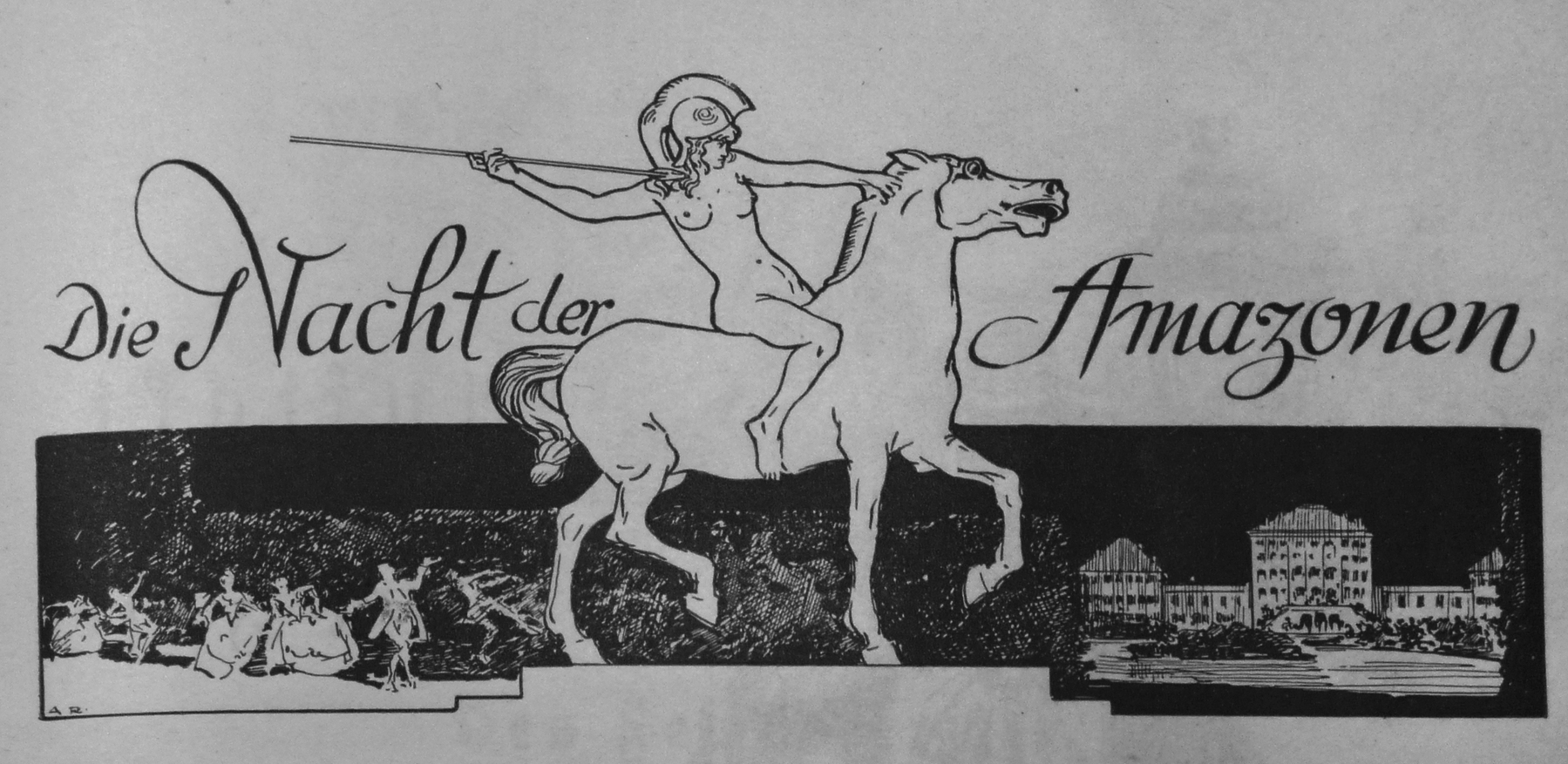
Illustration from 1937 program for Die Nacht der Amazonen, designed by Albert Reich.

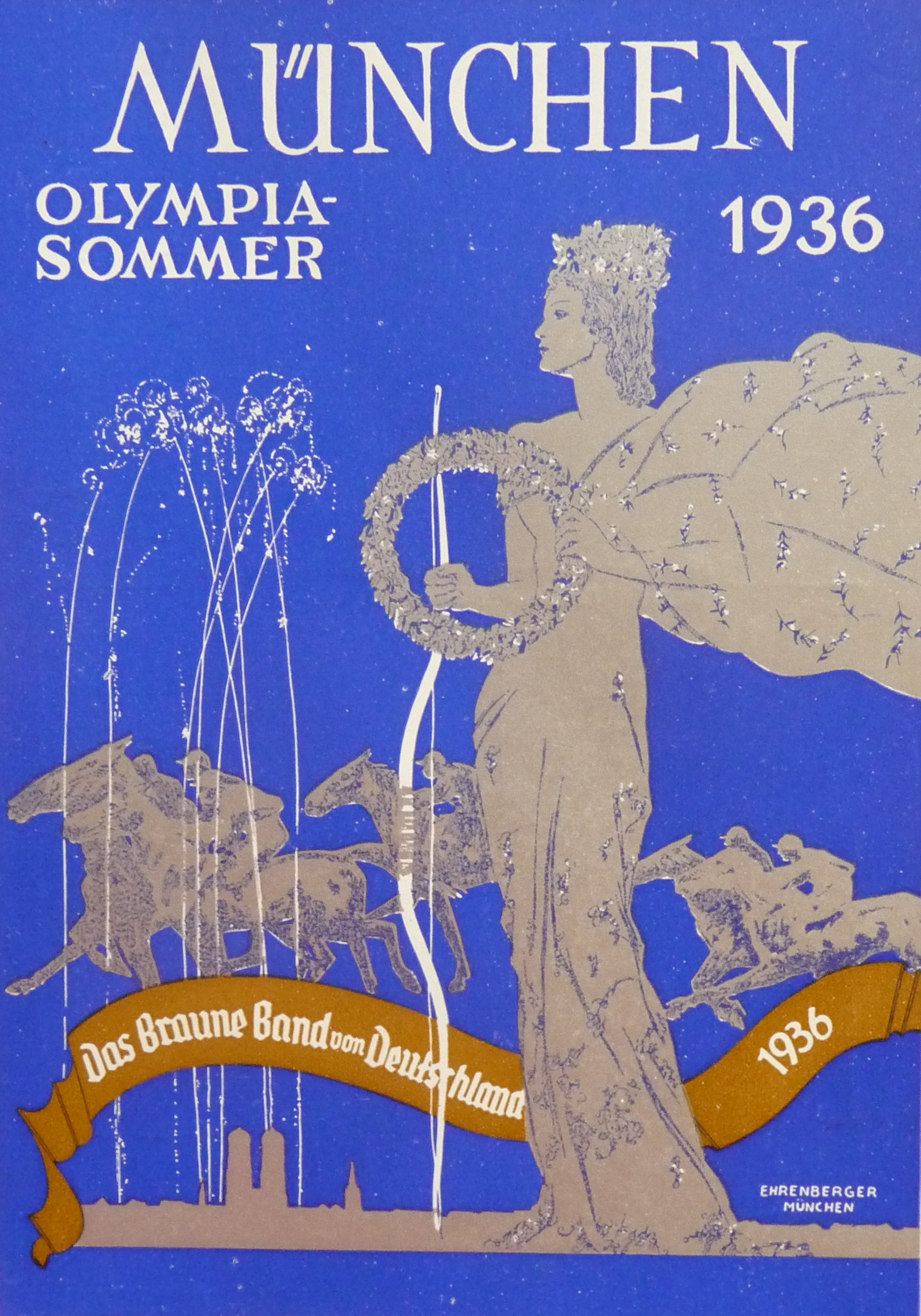
Postcard promoting Munich as Hitler's "Capital of German Art", designed by Ludwig (Lutz) Ehrenberger, in the Olympia-Sommer 1936. In the foreground the amazon with longbow and victory wreath. The award of the horse races was The Brown Ribbon of Germany.

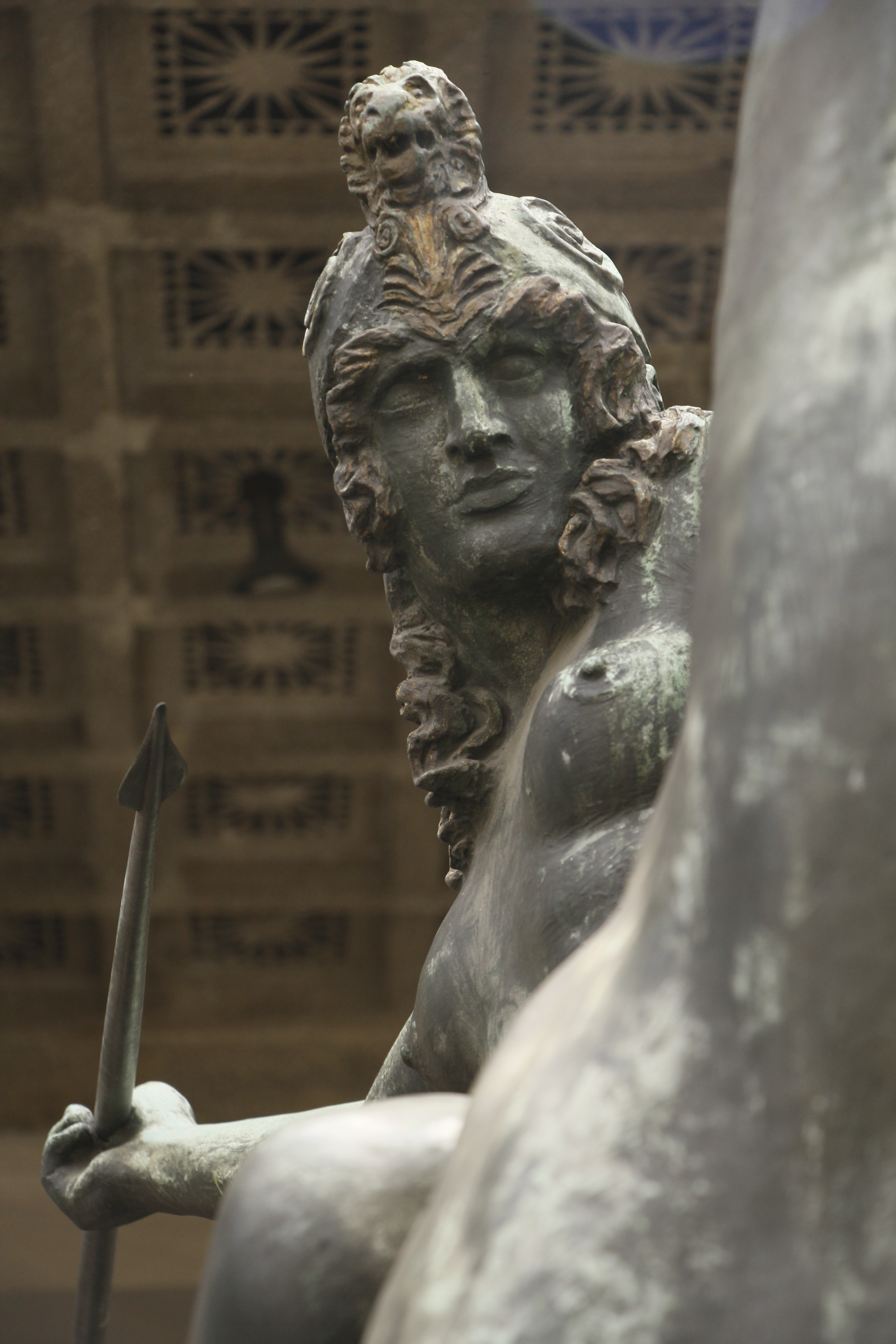
The German sculptor and painter Franz Stuck created 1914 the bronze casting of a nude amazon. This recast from 1936 was a gift to Adolf Hitler.

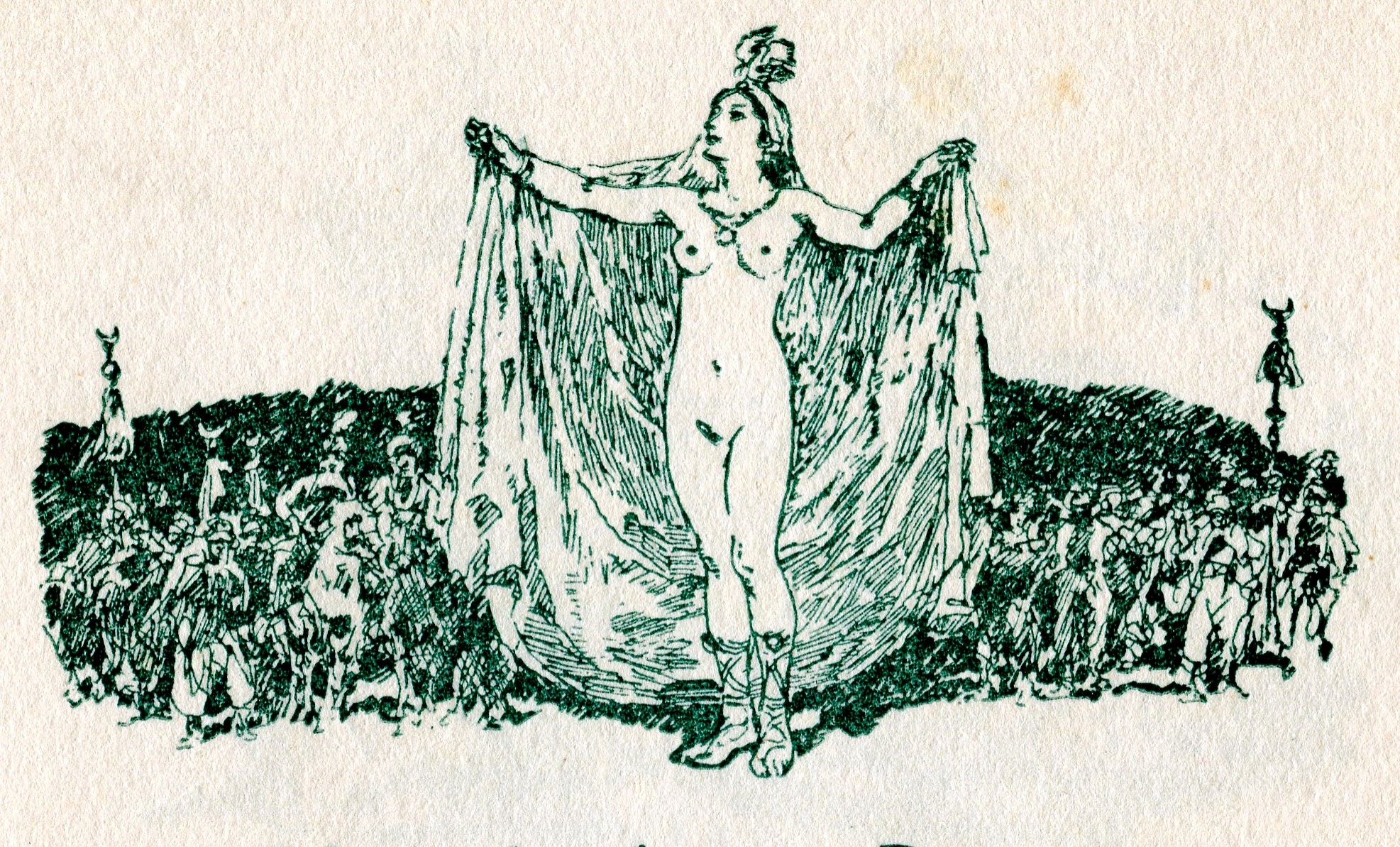
Detail of the illustrated program of the 1939 show. The artist, Albert Reich (1881–1942), was art director of the shows and created the cover for the first edition of Hitler's Mein Kampf.

The Night of the Amazons (German title: Nacht der Amazonen) was the name of a Nazi propaganda event that was held annually in Munich in the Nymphenburg Palace Park in the 1930s. The events were held on 27 July 1936, 31 July 1937, 30 July 1938 and 29 July 1939, and were the evening highlight of the International Horse Racing Week Munich-Riem. Members of the SS-Cavalry, variety show girls, and international stars performed at the open-air revue with up to 2,500 participants.

In addition to highlighting Munich as a travel destination, the event was intended to present Germany's Nazi regime as cosmopolitan and friendly to foreigners, and promote Nazi ideology.

== Origin ==
The International Racing Week at Munich-Riem was invented in 1934 to present world-class equestrian sports in Munich and attract visitors to show off the new Nazi society. The event was organized by Christian Weber, whose personal friendship with Adolf Hitler went back to the early 1920s. All international horse clubs were invited. In 1936, the prize money for the Brown Ribbon of Germany was doubled. Being 100.000 Reichsmark, it was thus the continent's highest prize. That year was also a special anniversary, "500 Years of Horse Racing in Munich", which featured numerous major events. According to Weber, the evening highlight of the horse races for the Brown Ribbon should make a noise at home and in the world. Together with Paul Wolfrum, the head of tourism of Munich and Southern Bavaria, they created the "Night of the Amazons", an evening event with 10,000 spectators. Weber used the former summer residence of the Bavarian kings as scenery for his ambitious self-portrayal and that of the Nazi ruling system.

== Preliminary work and financing ==
Despite weeks of personnel-intensive rehearsals and preparations, no alternative date was set. The enormously expensive financing was taken over by the Nazi regime organization The Brown Ribbon of Germany. For the first event in 1936, the two access avenues and the entire palace complex were provided with electric light for the first time. Concerns of the Bavarian Administration of State-Owned Palaces, Gardens and Lakes also had to be addressed, e.g., fire hazards due to large fireworks shows, and damage caused by horse hooves, crowds of people and underground installations. Security personnel were provided by the SS.

== Content ==
The event always consisted of two different parts, which differed in content from year to year. Obvious Nazi propaganda was avoided. Besides international stars, hundreds of horses were put on stage. The first part of the event had a historical theme, which was located in the courtly 18th century environment, thereby branded as decadent. In the second part of the event, the "New Age" and "Master Race", glorified by the Nazi ideology, were presented. Under the pretext of ancient mythology, more nudity was staged from year to year. A bronze sculpture created by Franz Stuck in 1913/14 was considered the Amazon par excellence. A replica was erected in front of the Villa Stuck in Munich in 1936.

In 1936, Hans Gruß, the manager of the Deutsches Theater (Munich), directed the event. In 1937 he was replaced by Paul Wolz, who directed it until 1939. The dance performances incorporated choreographic inspiration from the latest UFA GmbH and Hollywood films.

== Lighting technology ==
Wilhelm Hindelang was responsible for the lighting production. During a stay in New York City in 1936, the electrical engineer had studied the various lighting systems on Broadway theaters and the night illumination of Niagara Falls. The illumination of the "Night of the Amazons" enabled him to express his creativity and expertise. He worked out the lighting plans and created lighting effects with Ultraviolet light chains, colored underwater spotlights and a dance floor illuminated from below. A large part of the lighting and the telephone system for the direction and lighting instructions were provided by the armed forces (Wehrmacht). In 1938, the passionate amateur filmmaker with his innovative use of light was able to shoot the event on Kodachrome. It was probably the first color film shot at night in the German Reich.

== Horsemanship ==
Equestrian skills - including the High School of Classical dressage - were used by the ambitious SS riders to create a public impact. Many of the riders were members of the SS-Totenkopfverbände who guarded the Dachau concentration camp during the day. Hermann Fegelein, award-winning jump jockey and ambitious protégé of Christian Weber and head of the SS Main Riding School Riem since 1937, trained them as well as the "Amazons".

== Dance ==
The Munich State Opera ballet took part in the first Night of the Amazons in 1936. However, since classical ballet was said to have too little Germanness and national pride and to have been affected by foreign influence, a wide variety of dance schools with expressive dance were used from 1937 onwards. Following the Nazi ideology, the dancers symbolized the "voluntary and vibrant integration into the large community structure with the so-called New Dance". Young girls of the NS girls‘ organisation Faith and Beauty Society were used for mass scenes, too.

== Celebrity participants ==
Every year, internationally renowned stars participated in the event, such as Margaret Severn from New York and Eugene Iskoldoff with dancers from the Covent Garden Ballet Russe in 1936. In the following years, the Scala-Girls from Berlin and the Hiller-Girls performed as well as singers such as Hans-Hermann Nissen and Erna Sack.

== Nudity ==
Christian Weber increasingly made use of the insight he had gained during his 1937 visit to the Exposition Internationale des Arts et Techniques dans la Vie Moderne - and the relevant establishments in Paris - that "our naked German girls are better looking than the French women." His conclusion for the Night of the Amazons was: "All we have to do is take off the clothes of the girls right here at home, put them into the spotlight, and men with money to spend will forsake Paris for Munich." From 1938 onward the number of women dressed only in skin-colored panties increased. For the first time, 150 bronzed male and female participants were shown, who were covered with bronze-colored theatrical make-up from the crown to the sole, thus bearing considerable health risks.

== Music ==
The first part of the series began with fanfare blowers, followed by German military marches. After the break classical music alternated with singing. Hunting horn and alpine folk music were played as well.

== Spectators and playing field ==
Tribunes and standing places were placed on the extended so-called inner ground floor of the Nymphenburg Park. The celebrities had their places of honour on the castle's perron. In 1936 almost all European kings were present. With 20,000 visitors, the Night of the Amazons was always sold out. To offer something to the curious spectators in front of the castle, the building was illuminated, open fire burned on pylons, gondolas drove down the castle canal.

== Safety precautions ==
Every year members of the Gestapo combed the extensive area of the Nymphenburg Palace with great care as the presence of Adolf Hitler was hoped for. Hitler, however, preferred the Bayreuth Festival with Richard Wagner's music taking place the same time.

== Literature ==
- Fuchsberger, Doris: Nacht der Amazonen - Eine Münchner Festreihe zwischen NS-Propaganda und Tourismusattraktion, München 2017. ISBN 978-3-86906-855-8 (German).
- Pope, Ernest R.: Munich Playground, New York 1941.
- Herbert Rosendorfer: Die Nacht der Amazonen. Novel. Kiepenheuer & Witsch, 1989, ISBN 3-462-01995-3 (German).
