= Reichsleiter =

Second-highest political rank of the Nazi Party

- Flag 1939–1945

- Pre and post 1939 insignia

- Armband
- Country: Nazi Germany
- Service branch: Nazi Party
- Abbreviation: RL
- Rank: Paramilitary rank
- Formation: 2 June 1933
- Abolished: 8 May 1945
- Next higher rank: Führer
- Next lower rank: Gauleiter

Reichsleiter (German pronunciation: [ˈʁaɪ̯çsˌlaɪ̯tɐ], transl. national leader or Reich leader) was the second-highest political rank in the Nazi Party (NSDAP), subordinate only to the office of Führer. Reichsleiter also functioned as a paramilitary rank within the NSDAP and was the highest rank attainable in any Nazi organisation.

Each Reichsleiter reported directly to the Führer, Adolf Hitler. Men of the rank Reichsleiter collectively formed part of the Reichsleitung (Reich leadership) of the NSDAP, which was originally located in the "Brown House" in Munich. Each Reichsleiter was in charge of a broad area of responsibility in the party. Hitler originally established the rank of Reichsleiter on 2 June 1933 and appointed 16 individuals to that rank. Subsequently, a further 6 individuals were appointed to the rank between 1933 and 1938: von Epp, Frick, Bormann, Lutze, Hierl and Huhnlein.

== List of Reichsleiters ==
This is the list of men of the rank of Reichsleiter in the Nazi Party set forth in the National Socialist Yearbook:

- Max Amann, Head of the Party Publishing House, Eher-Verlag.
- Martin Bormann, Chief of the Party Chancellery.
- Philipp Bouhler, Chief of the Chancellery of the Führer of the NSDAP.
- Walter Buch, Chairman of USCHLA, the Supreme Party Court (Oberstes Parteigericht der NSDAP).
- Ricardo Walther Oscar Darré, Chief of the NSDAP Agrarian Office.
- Otto Dietrich, Reich Press Chief of the NSDAP.
- Franz Ritter von Epp, Chief of the NSDAP Office of Colonial Policy (Kolonialpolitisches Amt)
- Karl Fiehler, Chief of the NSDAP Main Office for Municipal Politics.
- Hans Frank, Chief of the NSDAP Legal Office.
- Wilhelm Frick, Leader of the NSDAP parliamentary bloc in the Reichstag.
- Joseph Goebbels, Reich Propaganda Leader of the NSDAP.
- Wilhelm Grimm, Chairman of the Second Chamber of USCHLA, the Supreme Party Court (Oberstes Parteigericht der NSDAP).
- Rudolf Hess, Deputy Führer.
- Konstantin Hierl, Leader of the Reich Labor Service.
- Heinrich Himmler, Reichsführer-SS and Chief of the German Police.
- Adolf Hühnlein, Korpsführer of the NSKK.
- Robert Ley, Reich Organization Leader of the NSDAP and head of the German Labor Front.
- Viktor Lutze, Chief of Staff of the Sturmabteilung (SA) 1934–1943.
- Ernst Röhm, Chief of Staff of the Sturmabteilung (SA) 1931–1934.
- Alfred Rosenberg, Chief of the NSDAP Office of Foreign Affairs.
- Baldur von Schirach, Reich Youth Leader, Reichsjugendführer of the Hitler Youth (HJ) until August 1940.
- Franz Xaver Schwarz, Reich Treasurer (Reichsschatzmeister) of the NSDAP.
