= Membership freeze of the NSDAP =

On 19 April 1933, the Nazi Party (NSDAP) introduced a moratorium on new memberships to cope with the flood of applications following its seizure of power on 30 January 1933. This moratorium was only eased on 20 April 1937, and completely lifted on 10 May 1939.

== Background ==
Both the Nazi seizure of power at the beginning of 1933, referred to in Nazi speech as the "seizure of power" or "national uprising", and the course and outcome of the March 1933 German federal election, led to mass resignations from all other political parties in Germany. The Communist Party of Germany (KPD) and the Social Democratic Party (SPD) were particularly affected, but also the Catholic Centre Party and other parties on the centre-right. Subsequently, hundreds of thousands of Germans applied for membership in the NSDAP. As a result, the number of party members rose from 850,000 (January 1933) to almost 2.5 million (January 1935). The numerous new members were mockingly and pejoratively referred to as March fallen.

The Nazi leadership itself suspected that among the high number of new registrations, which also overwhelmed the party administration, there were thousands of "opportunists" and political opponents. Unlike the Old Fighters, they would not want to become members out of National Socialist conviction, but for personal gain or with the aim of sabotage.

== Imposition of the admissions ban ==
To counteract this, the party leadership reacted to the influx of members on 19 April 1933 with a nationwide, indefinite membership freeze, which was formalised in an order issued on 19 April 1933 by the Reich Treasurer of the NSDAP, Franz Xaver Schwarz, and came into effect on 1 May 1933. Regarding the freeze, on 30 April 1933 the official gazette of the NSDAP Reich leadership further stated: "After this date, no office of the movement may accept new applications. The Gaue may submit to the Reich leadership, by 15 May at the latest, the new applications received by their offices before 1 May". Accordingly, a very high number of party memberships were recorded on 1 May 1933, the "Day of National Labour".

Exempt from the membership freeze were male members of the Hitler Youth aged 18 and over, and female members of the League of German Girls (BDM) aged 21 and over, who had been members of the organisation for four years. They were thus still permitted to join the Nazi Party (NSDAP).

=== Minor relaxations ===
The complete ban on new members was subsequently eased somewhat, in addition to the existing special regulations. Hans Schemm, the Gauleiter of Gau Bayreuth, succeeded in obtaining an exception for his Gau, so that membership in the party became possible there on 1 May 1935. On 8 November 1935, members of the Stahlhelm who had joined the organization before 30 January 1933, were permitted to join the NSDAP, with the effective date of admission being 1 April 1936. Finally, in 1937, Schwarz, with Order 3/37, authorized the admission of former NSBO and NS-Hago (National Socialist Trade and Industry Organization) members into the NSDAP, effective 1 March 1937.

For the Saarland, which was the League of Nations mandate of Territory of the Saar Basin until 1935, the admission freeze was eased as of 1 November 1935, and in the Free City of Danzig no later than 1 May 1936.

=== Major relaxations ===
With Order 18/37 of 20 April 1937, membership in the Nazi Party was finally made possible for all those who had been active as National Socialists in the party's organizations and affiliated associations since the seizure of power. After the implementation of Order 18/37, Adolf Hitler set a ratio of 1:10 between the number of party members and the number of German citizens as the ideal target.

Members who joined on 1 May 1937 initially had the status of "party candidates" thus assuming all obligations, in particular the duty to pay dues and report to the authorities, and were also allowed to wear the party badge from January 1938 onwards. However, they only had a waiting period for admission to the party until a red membership card was sent to them by the Reich leadership. The joining date of 1 May 1937, is the most frequent among all NSDAP members, even more so than 1 May 1933.

With these extended special regulations for joining the party, the number of members increased considerably from 1937 onwards, with the NSDAP having around 5.3 million members in March 1939.

=== End of ban ===
Following the complete lifting of the membership freeze for Nazi Germany and Gau Danzig by Order 34/39 of 10 May 1939, which came into effect retroactively to 1 May 1939, membership numbers increased once again. The party candidate program was simultaneously abolished.

== Renewed admission ban from 1942 ==
On 2 February 1942, a renewed admission ban was announced, which essentially only allowed admission to the party for members of the Hitler Youth and the League of German Girls by age cohort, and remained in effect until the end of World War II.

In 1945, the number of Nazi memberships issued amounted to approximately 10.17 million out of about 79 million inhabitants (13%).

== Bibliography ==
- Jürgen W. Falter: Hitlers Parteigenossen. Die Mitglieder der NSDAP 1919–1945. Campus, Frankfurt am Main 2020, ISBN 978-3-593-51180-1. S. 34–43.
- Wolfgang Benz (Hrsg.): Wie wurde man Parteigenosse? Die NSDAP und ihre Mitglieder. Fischer Taschenbuch Verlag, Frankfurt am Main 2009, ISBN 978-3-596-18068-4.
