= Franz Xaver Schwarz =

German Nazi Treasurer (1875–1947)

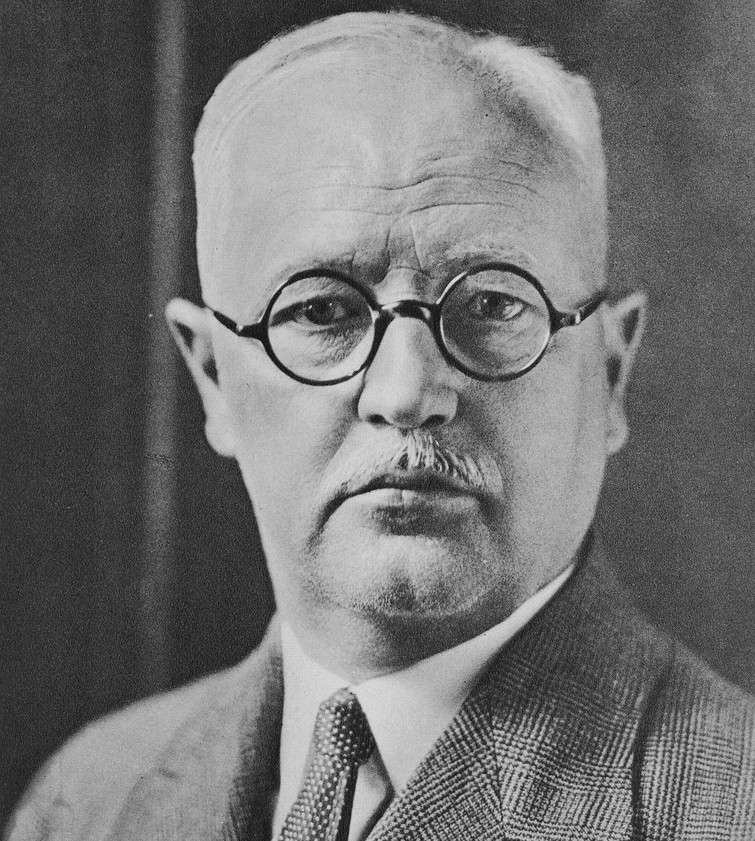
- Schwarz in 1939

National Treasurer of the Nazi Party
- In office 21 March 1925 – 8 May 1945
- Appointed by: Adolf Hitler
- Preceded by: Position created
- Succeeded by: Position abolished

Reichsleiter
- In office 2 June 1933 – 8 May 1945
- Appointed by: Adolf Hitler
- Preceded by: Position created
- Succeeded by: Position abolished

Member of the Reichstag
- In office March 1933 – 8 May 1945
- Constituency: Franconia (1933–1938); Upper Bavaria–Swabia (1938–1945)

Personal details
- Born: 27 November 1875 Günzburg, Kingdom of Bavaria, German Empire
- Died: 2 December 1947 (aged 72) Near Regensburg, Bavaria, Allied-occupied Germany
- Party: Nazi Party
- Other political affiliations: Deutschvölkischer Schutz- und Trutzbund; Greater German People's Party
- Occupation: Municipal Civil Servant
- Civilian awards: Golden Party Badge

Military service
- Allegiance: German Empire; Nazi Germany
- Branch/service: Imperial German Army; Schutzstaffel
- Years of service: 1914–1918; 1933–1945
- Rank: Leutnant; SS-Oberst-Gruppenführer
- Unit: Royal Bavarian Lifeguards; 3rd Landwehr Division
- Battles/wars: World War I
- Military awards: Bavarian Military Merit Cross, 2nd class War Merit Cross, 1st class with swords
- SS Memb. #: 38,500

Franz Xaver Schwarz (27 November 1875 – 2 December 1947) was a high ranking German Nazi Party official who served as Reichsschatzmeister (National Treasurer) of the Party throughout most of its existence. He was also one of the highest ranking members of the Schutzstaffel (SS).

== Early life ==
Schwarz was born in Günzburg, the seventh of eight children born to a master baker and his wife. He was educated up to a high school level at the Günzburger vocational training school. Schwarz married Berta Breher on 26 August 1899. From 1900 to 1924, except for the war years of 1914 to 1918, he worked as an "administrative official" in the city government of Munich. During World War I, Schwarz served as a warrant officer (Feldwebelleutnant) in the Imperial German Army. He served briefly as a platoon leader but due to gastric troubles which afflicted him for his entire life he was spared field duty beginning in January 1916. He was discharged from active service at the end of the war, given a 30 percent war disability pension, put into the reserves and commissioned a Leutnant in 1920. Schwarz went to work in an administrative capacity in the Munich City Council. In 1919 Schwarz joined the Deutschvölkischer Schutz- und Trutzbund, the largest and most influential antisemitic organization in the Weimar Republic.

== Nazi Party career ==
Schwarz joined the Nazi Party in 1922 and participated in the failed Beer Hall Putsch of November 1923. When the Party was banned by the German government, Schwarz joined the Greater German People's Community, a Nazi front organization based in Munich. He served as the Treasurer of its governing board from 9 July 1924 until it was disbanded.

With the re-establishment of the Nazi Party on 27 February 1925, Schwarz immediately rejoined and became party member number six. As an early party member, he later would be awarded the Golden Party Badge. He left his job as an accountant at the Munich City Hall to become the full-time Treasurer of the Nazi Party on 21 March 1925. He rebuilt the financial and administrative functions of the party. It was Schwarz who raised the money for the publication of Adolf Hitler's book, Mein Kampf. In April–May 1930 Schwarz negotiated the purchase of the party headquarters, the Brown House at 45 Brienner Straße in Munich. From December 1929 to October 1934, Schwarz was a City Councilor in Munich. From 16 September 1931 forward, Hitler granted Schwarz plenipotentiary powers over all financial matters of the Nazi Party.

After the Nazi seizure of power, Schwarz was elected to the Reichstag in March 1933 from the party's electoral list. At the November 1933 election, he was returned as a deputy from electoral constituency 26, Franconia, switching to constituency 24, Upper Bavaria-Swabia, at the March 1936 election and retaining this seat until the fall of the Nazi regime. On 2 June 1933, he was also named a Reichsleiter (Reich Leader), the second highest political rank of the Nazi Party. On 2 October 1933, Schwarz was made a member of the Academy for German Law at its inaugural meeting. Hitler attended Schwarz's 60th birthday celebration on 27 November 1935. Hitler's will, dated 2 May 1938 (which left his entire fortune to the party), included the provision that it be opened in Schwarz's presence.

Besides the party treasury (largely based on membership dues), Schwarz was responsible for the central assignment of NSDAP unique membership numbers. When members died or stopped paying dues, the old numbers were not freed up for new members. If old members picked up their dues later a new party number would be assigned. The Nazi Party had 8.5 million members on the books by 1945. Schwarz was regarded as an able administrator who generally kept out of party politics. As treasurer, he implemented the 1933 membership freeze of the NSDAP.

== SA and SS membership ==
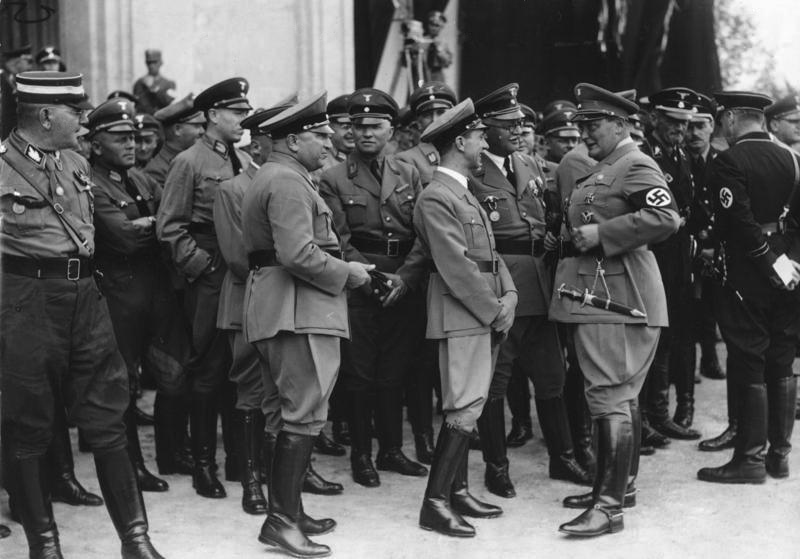
Nuremberg Rally 1936. Hermann Göring is talking with Joseph Goebbels and Franz Xaver Schwarz. To the left of Goebbels is Robert Ley, who along with Göring, was charged at the Nuremberg war crimes trials with crimes against humanity.

On 18 December 1931, Schwarz was made an SA-Gruppenführer in the Sturmabteilung (SA), the Nazi paramilitary organization. In June 1932, Schwarz joined the Schutzstaffel, as an SS-Gruppenführer, with SS member number 38,500. On 1 July 1933, he was promoted to SS-Obergruppenführer. On 9 November 1933, his SA rank was raised to SA-Obergruppenführer as well. Finally, on 20 April 1942, he was promoted to the newly created rank of SS-Oberst-Gruppenführer, becoming one of only four people to ever hold the rank.

On 5 June 1944, Schwarz received a high military award, the War Merit Cross, 1st class with Swords (Kriegsverdienstkreuz 1. Klasse mit Schwertern) by Hitler for his work during the Munich air raids of 24–25 April of that year. Further, Schwarz led a Volkssturm battalion in Grünwald at the end of the war. He was arrested by the Americans and interned at Camp Ashcan.

== Death ==
Schwarz died in another Allied internment camp near Regensburg on 2 December 1947, due to recurring gastric troubles. He was 72. In September 1948, Schwarz was posthumously classified by the Munich denazification court as a "major offender" and all his assets were confiscated.

== See also ==
- List of SS-Oberst-Gruppenführer
