= Alter Kämpfer =

Nazi Party member who joined before the 1930 federal election

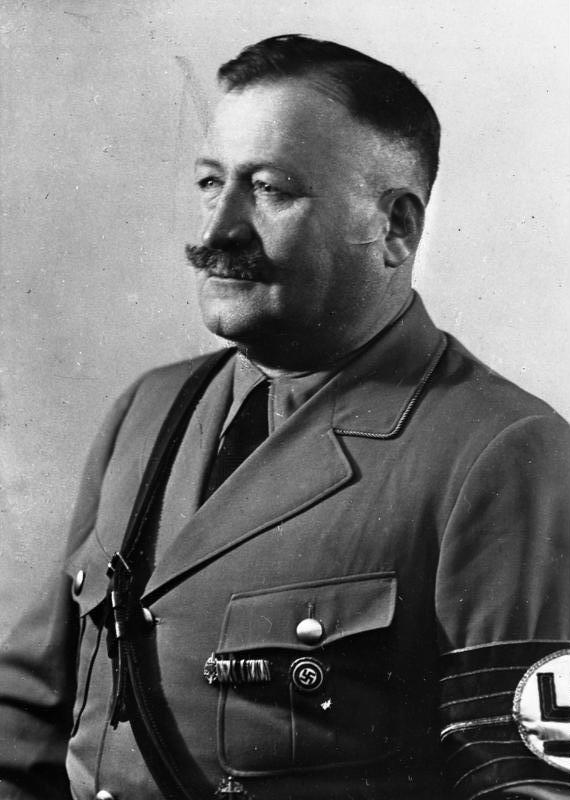
Christian Weber, 1934

Alter Kämpfer (German for "Old Fighter", German pronunciation: [altɐ ˈkɛmpfɐ]; plural: Alte Kämpfer) is a term referring to the earliest members of the Nazi Party, those who joined it before the electoral breakthrough of the Nazis in 1930, with many belonging to the party as early as its first foundation in 1919–1923.

Those who joined the party after the election of September 1930 were known to the Alte Kämpfer as Septemberlings, and those who joined the party after the assumption of power on 30 January 1933 were known as the Märzveilchen.

== Awards ==
As the party's "Old Guard" and of proven dedication to the movement during its so-called "Period of Struggle" (Kampfzeit) in 1925–1933, the Alte Kämpfer were distinguished from the flood of new members who joined following 1933 for opportunistic reasons. A number of special awards/insignia were instituted for that purpose:

- the Honour Chevron for the Old Guard, awarded to those who had joined the party or its affiliated organisations before 30 January 1933;
- the Golden Party Badge, awarded to the first 100,000 members of the party;
- the Blood Order, awarded to those who had participated in the abortive 1923 Beer Hall Putsch.

== Status ==
After the Nazis had taken power in 1933, the Alte Kämpfer received preference in employment and promotion. Many were given prestigious jobs in opera houses, government buildings and universities of the Third Reich. Many achieved high status, such as Christian Weber, a former bouncer who was made an SS general.

Nazi propaganda glorified them as a small handful of fighters against almost impossible odds.

== See also ==
- Old Bolshevik
- Membership freeze of the NSDAP
