= Ulrich Graf =

Member of the Nazi Party and one of Adolf Hitler's inner circle (1878–1950)

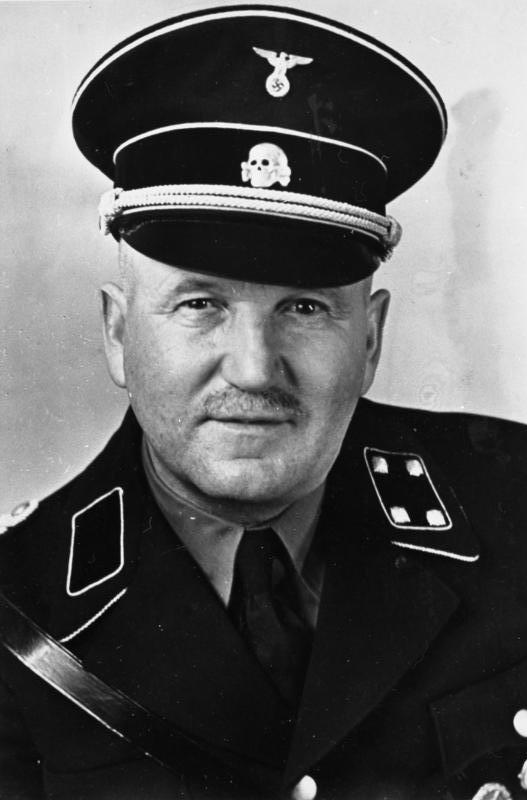
- Graf in 1934
- Born: 6 July 1878; Bachhagel, Kingdom of Bavaria, German Empire
- Died: 3 March 1950 (aged 71) Munich, West Germany
- Allegiance: Nazi Germany
- Branch: Sturmabteilung; Schutzstaffel
- Service years: 1932–1945
- Rank: SS-Brigadeführer

Ulrich Graf (6 July 1878 – 3 March 1950) was an early member of the Nazi Party and one of Adolf Hitler's inner circle. In 1923, he served in a bodyguard unit for Hitler and was wounded in the Beer Hall Putsch. Graf was considered a lifesaver for Hitler, using himself as human shield and taking five bullets for him. He was a long serving member of the Munich City Council and the Supreme Party Court and in 1936 was elected to the Reichstag. After the war, Graf was sentenced to five years of hard labour by a denazification court and died in 1950.

== Biography ==
Shortly after the First World War, Graf became a member of the German Workers' Party (DAP). Later, the DAP was renamed the National Socialist German Workers' Party (NSDAP; Nazi Party) and taken over by Adolf Hitler. Founded in 1920, the Sturmabteilung (SA) was the first of many paramilitary protection squads that worked to protect Nazi officials. These storm troopers, outfitted in brown uniforms, were initially charged with the duty of keeping order at Nazi Party meetings. They soon expanded their role to include disruption of rival political party's functions. Graf was an early member of the SA.

Graf, a former butcher and amateur wrestler, was selected by Hitler as a personal bodyguard. Graf was a member of a small unit formed in 1923 for Hitler's protection, which became known as Stoßtrupp-Hitler. At that time the bodyguard unit numbered no more than 20 men, including Ulrich Graf.

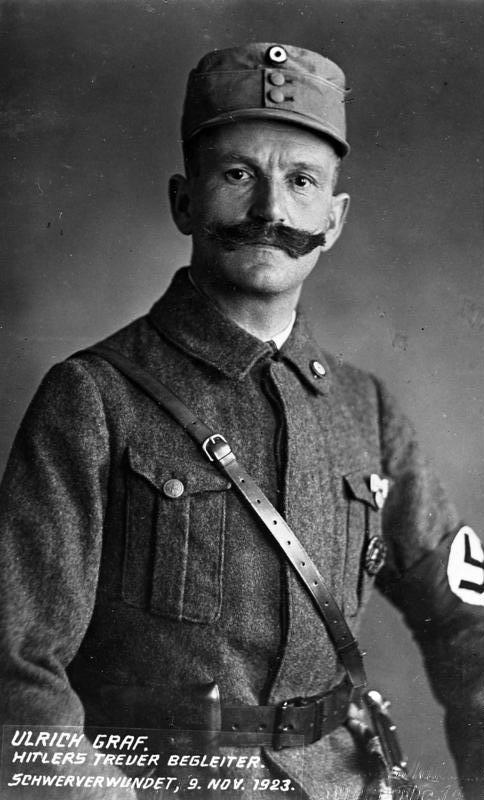
Translated Caption:"Ulrich Graf, Hitler's faithful companion, seriously wounded 9th of November, 1923"

That same year, Graf took part in the ill-fated Beer Hall Putsch in November. When the column of SA troops approached the blocking detachment of police, Graf, stepped forward and shouted "Don't shoot. His Excellency General Ludendorff is coming." A single shot was fired, setting off a volley of shots by both sides. The firing lasted for only sixty seconds, but in that time 15 putschists, four police officers, and a bystander lay dead.

"Police opened fire and Graf took a bullet to the shoulder before throwing himself on Hitler and taking five bullets.”

Hitler was convicted of high treason and sentenced to five years in prison. He only served nine months, not including his time in remand.

In December 1924, Graf was elected City Councillor in Munich and took office 1 January 1925. In a meeting with Bavarian authorities in January 1925, Hitler agreed to respect the authority of the state and promised that he would seek political power only through the democratic process. The meeting paved the way for the ban on the NSDAP to be lifted on 16 February. When Hitler re-established the Party on 27 February, Graf joined as member number 8. When later that year Hitler set up the Committee for Investigation and Settlement to settle Party disputes internally before they became public, Graf was made a member of the three man Party tribunal. He would continue to serve on this panel after the Nazi seizure of power when it became the Supreme Party Court. In 1929, he was re-elected as City Councillor. By 1933, he was an SS-Sturmbannführer in the Schutzstaffel (SS) and would attain the rank of SS-Brigadeführer in 1943. At the parliamentary elections of March 1936 and April 1938, Graf was elected from the Nazi Party electoral list as a deputy to the Reichstag and he remained a member until the fall of the Nazi regime in May 1945.

After the war ended, a denazification court in 1948 sentenced Graf to five years in a labour camp. He died in March 1950.

His family sold his possessions, to break with his past. His Blutorden (Blood Order) medal was sold by a British collector in 2019 for £36,000, nine times the estimate at Hansons, Derbyshire, to an overseas buyer.

== See also ==
- Adolf Hitler's bodyguard

== Bibliography ==
- Bullock, Alan (1962) [1952]. Hitler: A Study in Tyranny. London: Penguin Books. LCCN 63005065.
- Fulda, Bernhard (2009). Press and Politics in the Weimar Republic. Oxford: Oxford University Press. ISBN 978-0-19-954778-4.
- Hamilton, Charles (1996). Leaders and Personalities of the Third Reich. Vol. 1. San Jose CA: R. James Bender Publishing. ISBN 978-0-91213-827-5.
- Kershaw, Ian (2008). Hitler: A Biography. New York: W. W. Norton & Company. ISBN 978-0-393-06757-6.
- McNab, Chris (2009). The SS: 1923–1945. Amber Books Ltd. ISBN 978-1-906626-49-5.
- Shirer, William (1990) [1959]. The Rise and Fall of the Third Reich. New York: MJF Books. ISBN 978-1-56731-163-1.
- Weale, Adrian (2010). The SS: A New History. London: Little, Brown. ISBN 978-1408703045.
