= Gauleiter =

Third-highest political rank of the Nazi Party

- Country: Nazi Germany
- Service branch: Nazi Party
- Abbreviation: GL
- Rank: Political rank
- Formation: 27 February 1925; 101 years ago
- Abolished: 8 May 1945; 81 years ago
- Next higher rank: Reichsleiter
- Next lower rank: Kreisleiter

A Gauleiter (German pronunciation: [ˈɡaʊlaɪtɐ]) was a regional leader of the Nazi Party (NSDAP) who served as the head of a Gau or Reichsgau. Gauleiter was the third-highest rank in the Nazi political leadership, subordinate only to Reichsleiter and the Führer, himself. The position was effectively abolished with the fall of the Nazi regime on 8 May 1945.

== History and development ==
=== Origin and early years ===
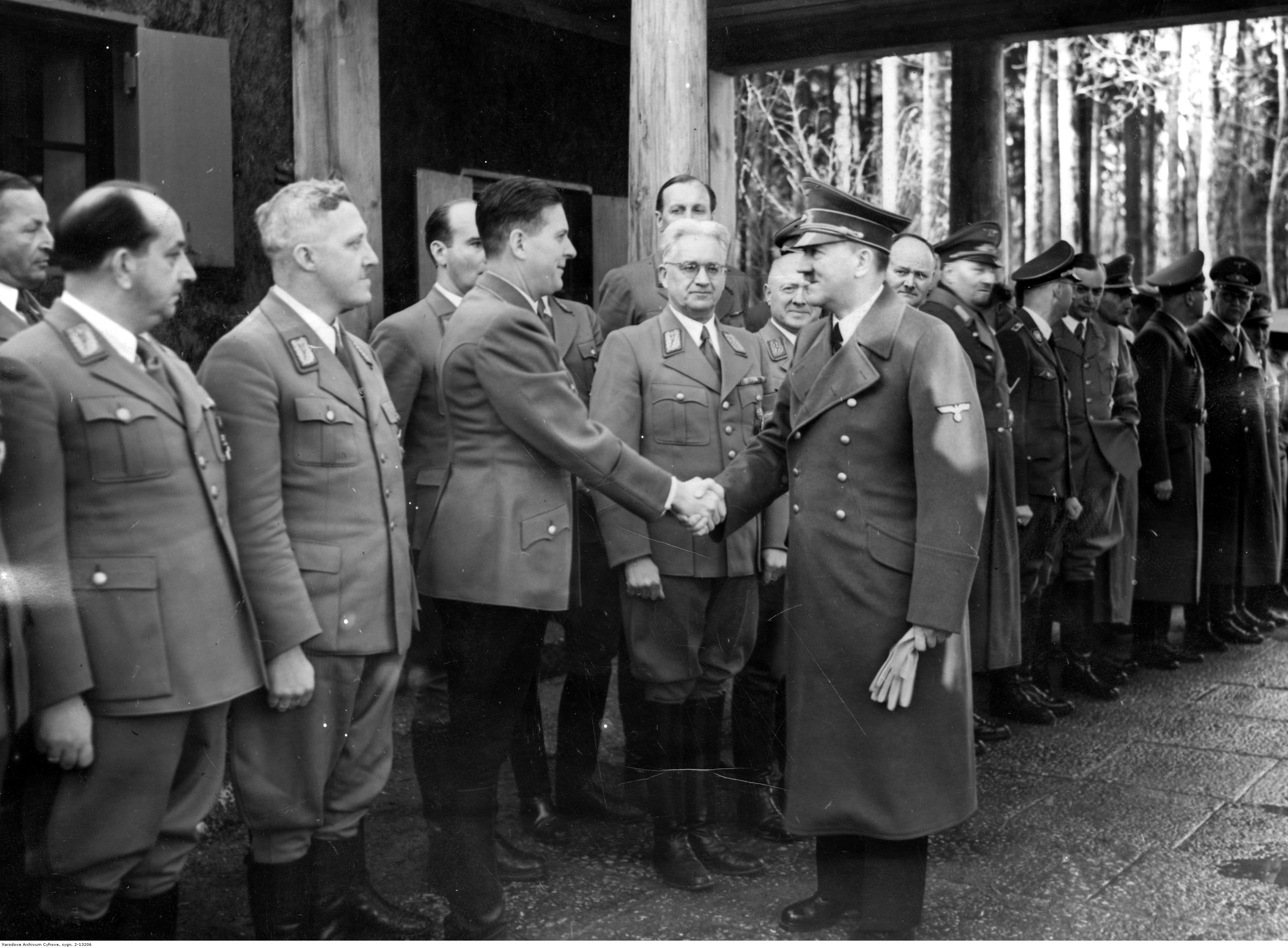
A group of Gauleiters greet Hitler at Gorlitz, 1943.

The first use of the term Gauleiter by the Nazi Party was in 1925 around the time Adolf Hitler re-founded the Party on 27 February, after the lifting of the ban that had been imposed on it in the aftermath of the Beer Hall Putsch of 9 November 1923. The word can be singular or plural in German usage, depending on its context, and derives from the German words Gau and leiter (leader). The word Gau is an old term for a region of the German Reich (Empire). The Frankish Realm and the Holy Roman Empire were both subdivided into Gaue (the plural form of Gau) which corresponds roughly with the English word "shire." It is still in use today as a generic component in the names of some regions mainly in Germany, Austria, Switzerland, the Netherlands and Belgium. (see: Gau Legacy).

In its formative years, local political activists organized the Party at the municipal level in their home areas. In effect, they were self-selected or had won out in local struggles for control. Though they were required to be approved by Hitler, this was usually a formality in these early years when he was still banned from speaking throughout most of Germany and had to rely on these homegrown leaders to organize the Party at the grass roots. In fact, it was not uncommon for local branch leaders to be selected by the Party members themselves. This was not officially prohibited by Hitler until 1929. By creating the position of Gauleiter, Hitler provided a means for him to exert more direct control over the local Party organizations. The Gauleiter was placed in charge of a specified geographical jurisdiction consisting of several Ortsgruppe (Local Groups).

The Gaue did not necessarily mirror the existing administrative or electoral divisions within the Weimar Republic. In these early years (1925–1927) it was not unusual for the local and regional organizations to be divided, dissolved, merged and renamed as the Party struggled to develop an improved organizational structure.

The number of Gaue fluctuated over the years. In 1928 there were 35 and by the end of the Nazi regime there were 43, including the non-territorial Gau Auslands-Organisation that represented Germans abroad.

The Gauleiters were appointed by Hitler (though in the earliest years Gregor Strasser had provisionally selected some in Northern Germany who still had to be confirmed in their position by Hitler). They were personally responsible to Hitler, served at his pleasure and were subject to immediate dismissal, but otherwise could not be removed without his consent. They were his personal representatives to the Gau and were, in effect, his viceroys in Party matters.

The Organization Book of the NSDAP described the Gauleiter’s relationship to Hitler in this manner:

The Gauleiter is directly subordinate to the Führer. He is appointed by the Führer. The Gauleiter bears overall responsibility to the Führer for the sector of sovereignty entrusted to him. The rights, duties, and jurisdiction of the Gauleiter result primarily from the mission assigned by the Führer and, apart from that, from detailed directives.

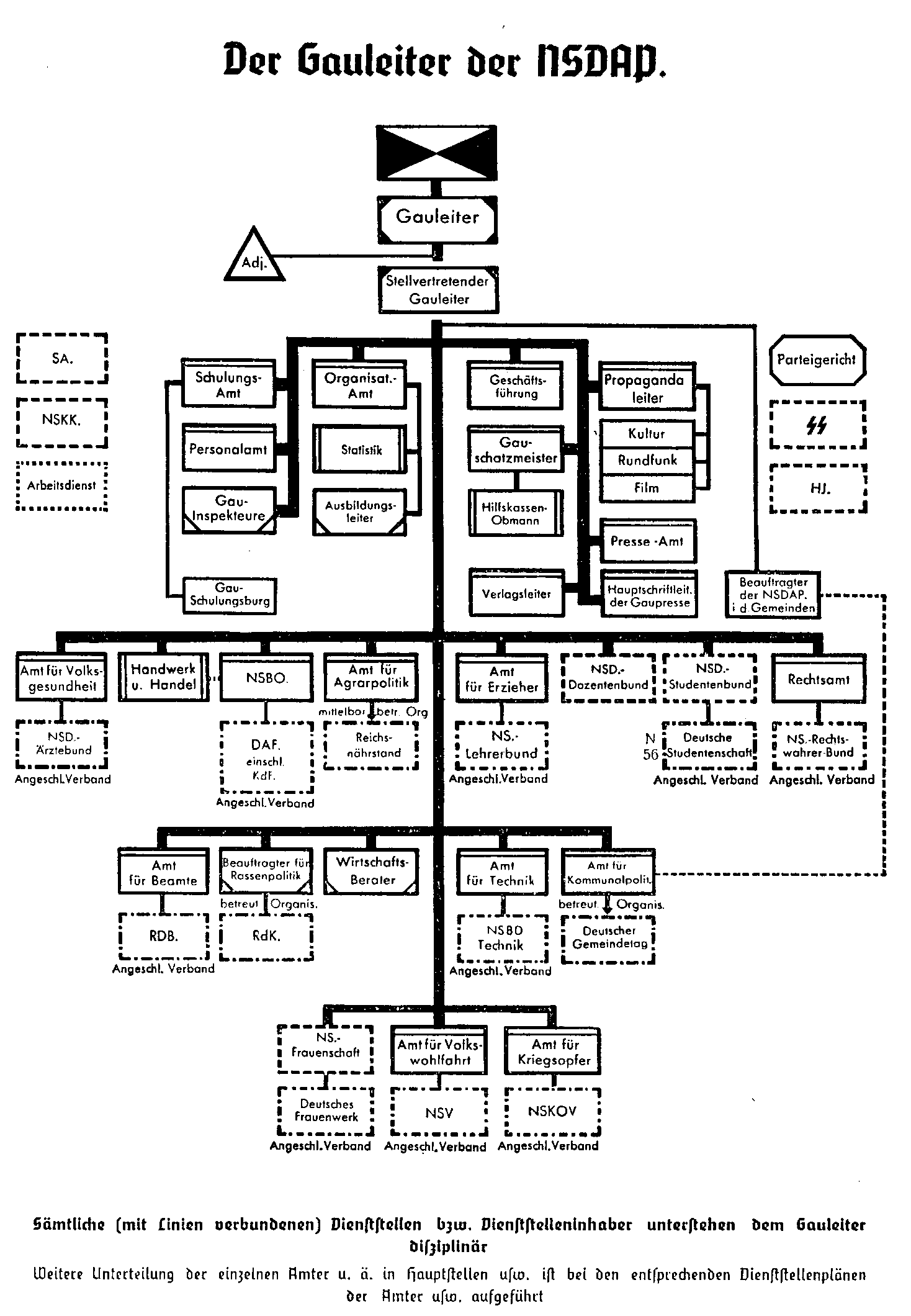
Organizational Chart of a typical Gauleitung (Gau Leadership) Office

Gauleiters were the regional heads of the Nazi Party's Political Organization and headed the Gauleitung (Gau Leadership) office. The responsibility and function of the Gauleiter was to ensure the authority of the Nazi Party within his area, to coordinate the activities of the Party and all its affiliated organizations, and to enlarge the influence of the Party over people and life in his Gau.

However, Gauleiters did not have direct supervisory control over the Gau paramilitary personnel, such as the Sturmabteilung (SA) or the Schutzstaffel (SS). In addition, subordinate Gau officials such as the Propaganda Leader, the Agricultural Expert and others owed a dual allegiance to the Gauleiter in their particular geographic area and to the head of the affiliate organization for their specific policy area at the national level. This made the Gauleiter’s coordination and control of all Party activities difficult and, at times, conflictive.

The authority of the Gauleiter extended down through the Party organization to all members through a strict vertical chain of command. The Gauleiter had direct authority over the Kreisleiters (County Leaders) who administered some 650 Kreise in Germany proper (913 at the height of expansion after 1941) and were established as an intermediary level between the Gauleiter and the local leaders in early 1929. These Kreisleiters in turn directed the Ortsgruppenleiters who oversaw towns or villages or part of a larger city, usually 1500 to 3000 households. Ortsgruppenleiters directed Zellenleiters (Cell Leaders) responsible for 160 to 480 households. Zellenleiters supervised the lowest local leaders, Blockleiters (Block Leaders) each of whom had charge of 40 to 60 households.

As the Party evolved its goal from revolutionary overthrow of the Weimar Republic to obtaining power through constitutional means, tactics for obtaining electoral success became paramount. In 1928, in preparation for more effectively contesting the upcoming Reichstag election, a major reorganization took place and most Gaue boundaries were adjusted to correspond with the existing Reichstag electoral constituencies, though a handful continued to be idiosyncratic. The role of the Gauleiters also evolved to become more administrative, involved in propaganda, organization and electioneering. Success was measured in terms of increased Party membership and voter turnout.

At the local level, Gauleiters often were elected as city councilors, as mayors and as deputies to the Landtags of the German States (Länder) where they headed the Nazi Party parliamentary faction. The first State to install its Gauleiter as Minister-president was Oldenburg on 16 June 1932, followed by Thuringia on 26 August 1932. Once in office, they proceeded to politicize all aspects of life within their control, and staffed civil service positions solely with candidates previously screened and approved by Party functionaries.

In July 1932, Strasser, now the Party Reichsorganisationsleiter (National Organization Leader) attempted to impose an additional centralized control over the Gauleiters. Therefore, they were subordinated to ten new officials with the title of Landesinspektor, mainly drawn from among the Gauleiter corps, each in charge of several Gaue within a larger geographic area. This intermediate level of bureaucracy limited Gauleiters' access to Hitler and they chafed under this new arrangement, which they saw as an attempt by Strasser to undermine their special relationship with Hitler.

This reorganization was short-lived and was repealed on 15 December 1932, after Strasser's resignation in a policy dispute with Hitler over whether to join in a national coalition government as a junior partner or to hold out for the Chancellorship. Hitler then reemphasized the special relationship between himself and the Gauleiters and they resumed their direct access to him.

=== After the Nazi seizure of power ===
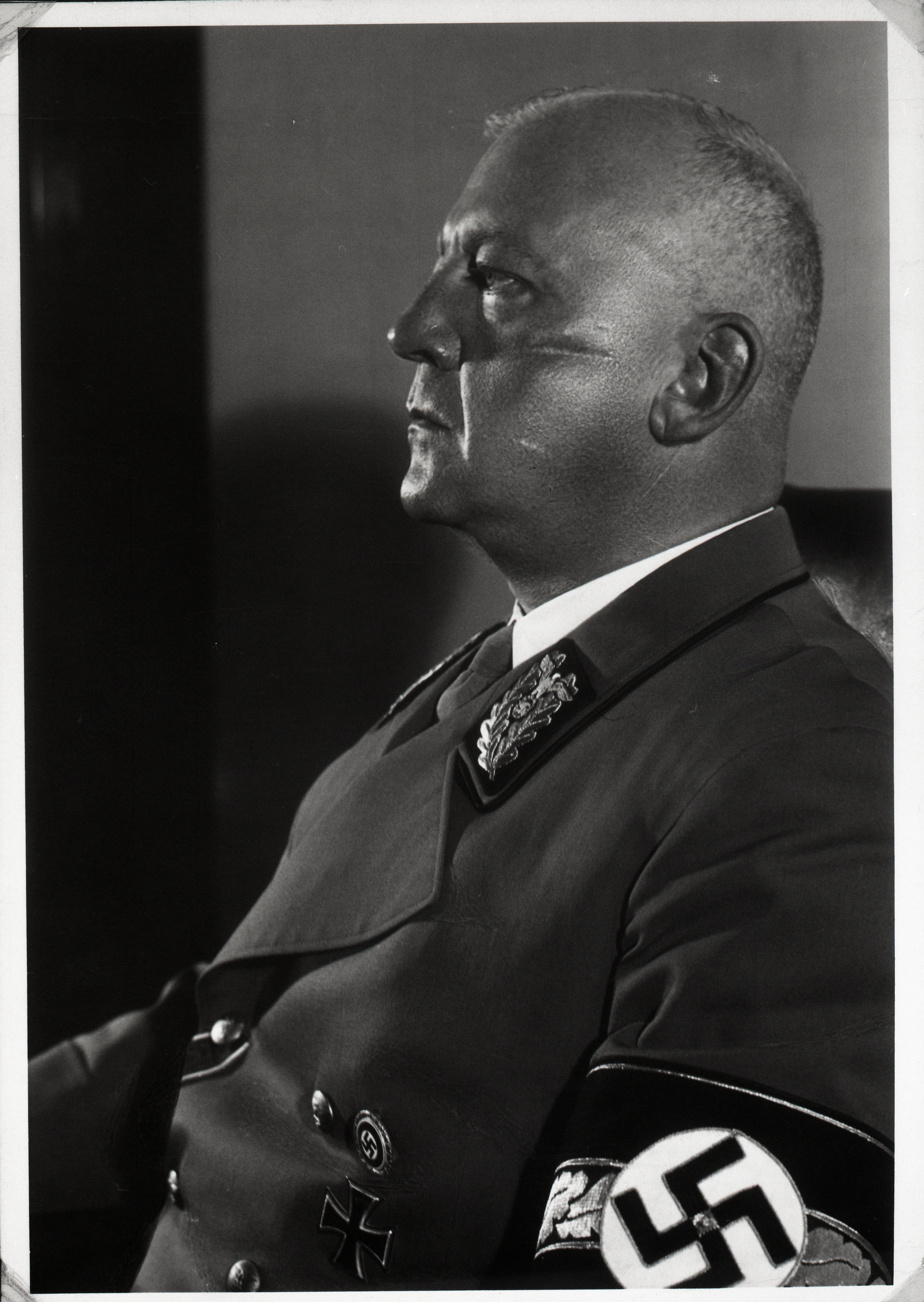
Adolf Wagner, Gauleiter in Munich, the headquarters of the Nazi Party, from 1 November 1929. Though incapacitated by a stroke in June 1942, he remained titular Gauleiter until his death on 12 April 1944.

On 30 January 1933, the Nazi Party took power and established the state of Nazi Germany. At the national government level, Hitler selected two Gauleiters to also become Reichsministers of two of the new ministries that he established: the Reich Ministry of Propaganda in March 1933 (Joseph Goebbels) and the Reich Ministry of Science, Education and Culture in May 1934 (Bernhard Rust).

As for regional governments, the Gauleiters quickly became the key agents in extending Nazi control over the German States (Länder) and Prussian provincial governments. Gauleiters soon obtained unquestioned authority in their jurisdiction. Party control over the civil administration became institutionalized when in most (but not all) cases the Gauleiter was appointed to the supreme civil administrative post in his area. Under the "Second Law on the Coordination of the States with the Reich" of 7 April 1933, the new position of Reichsstatthalter (Reich Governor) was created. Given broad powers, this official was charged with ensuring State compliance with the policies of the Reich central government, and was described by Hitler as a "viceroy of the Reich." Hitler staffed these posts almost exclusively with Gauleiters. Similarly, in the Prussian provinces, the Oberpräsident (High President) positions also were largely taken over by Gauleiters. Most Gauleiters thus united under their control the highest Party and governmental offices in their jurisdictions. However, since all Party Gau boundaries and State/provincial boundaries still did not necessarily coincide, this arrangement sometimes led to overlapping jurisdictions and added to the administrative conflict typical of Nazi Germany.

On 2 June 1933 Hitler created the new political rank of Reichsleiter (Reich Leader) in the Nazi Party and conferred it on 16 individuals with areas of broad national policy responsibility (e.g., propaganda, agriculture, the press, youth education). Gauleiter then became the third-highest rank in the Nazi political leadership, just below Reichsleiter. Importantly, however, the Reichsleiters were not given direct line authority over the Gauleiters who continued to have direct access to Hitler and remained his personal agents in the Gaue.

After the Anschluss with Austria (12 March 1938) and the seizure of the Sudetenland from Czechoslovakia (30 September 1938) the newly annexed territories were eventually organized into eight Reichsgaue and placed under the administration of Reichsstatthalters, all of whom were also the local Gauleiters. As in Germany proper, they controlled, in personal union, Party and State leadership. Several former leaders of the previously outlawed Austrian and Czechoslovak Nazi parties, in recognition of their past services, were accorded the title of Gauleiter ehrenhalber (honorary Gauleiter), which carried no Gaue assignments or responsibilities.

The Gauleiters were responsible for executing all the Party's policies, including its racial discrimination and persecution policies against the Jewish populace. One of the most infamous pogroms of the Nazi era, the Kristallnacht of 9–10 November 1938, had its origin at a meeting of the Nazi Party hierarchy in Munich commemorating the 15th anniversary of the Beer Hall Putsch. During the meeting, in response to the news of the assassination by a Jew of a German diplomat in Paris, Joseph Goebbels gave such an inflammatory address against the Jews that it sent the assembled Gauleiters rushing to the telephones to order punitive riots in their Gaue. On their orders, their local Political Organizations, together with SA members, unleashed an orgy of violence, arson, looting and destruction, resulting in deaths, injuries and massive property loss among Germany's Jewish population.

=== World War II ===
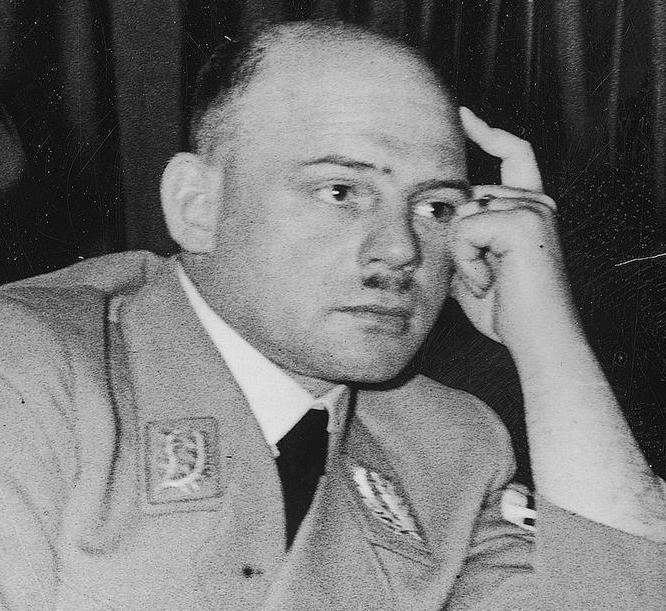
Fritz Sauckel was the Gauleiter of Thuringia, from 30 September 1927 to 8 May 1945 and the Reichsstatthalter of Thuringia from 5 May 1933. Also the Reich's General Plenipotentiary for Labor Deployment, he was executed as a war criminal after the Nuremberg trials.

On the launching of World War II in Europe on 1 September 1939, fifteen Gauleiters were appointed Reich Defense Commissioners (Reichsverteidigungskommissar) one in each military district (Wehrkreis) of Germany and Austria. They were charged with organizing civil defense and mobilization activities, including air defense and evacuation. They also oversaw wartime rationing measures and efforts to control the black market. Again, due to the additional overlapping and incongruent territorial jurisdictions, this contributed to ongoing jurisdictional squabbles.

After the conquest and annexation of Polish territory in October 1939, the newly added areas were organized into two new Reichsgaue and subjected to rule by Reichsstatthalters who were also Nazi Party Gauleiters. Here they were placed in charge of a ruthless policy of Germanization and genocide.

In 1940-1941 as additional military conquests occurred, four Gauleiters were selected to concurrently administer other occupied lands not directly annexed to the Reich. Granted the title of Reichskommissar, they ruled vast swaths of territory encompassing Norway, Belgium & Northern France, Ukraine and ”Ostland”. Another six Gauleiters were named Chief of Civil Administration of areas adjacent to their Gaue in Alsace, Lorraine, Luxembourg, Lower Styria, Upper Carniola and Bezirk Bialystok.

On 16 November 1942, the jurisdiction of the Reich Defense Commissioners was changed from the Wehrkreis to the Gau level, and all 42 territorial Gauleiters were appointed as Reich Defense Commissioners in their jurisdictions. They were charged with maximizing the mobilization of all internal manpower resources by registering men and women between the ages of sixteen and sixty for war-related work assignments. They were even put in charge of the construction of defensive fortifications with the use of forced labor and the civilian population. This led to further jurisdictional conflict between the military and civil authorities.

As the war progressed and the direction of the war effort consumed most of Hitler's time and attention, he became increasingly inaccessible to the Gauleiters. Almost constantly away at his military headquarters, Hitler decreed that all Party matters should be communicated to him only through Martin Bormann, who headed the Nazi Party Chancellery from May 1941 and was made “Secretary to the Führer” in April 1943. All communications between government ministries and the Gauleiters also was routed through Bormann.

In an interrogation before the Nuremberg Trials, Reichsminister of Armaments and War Production Albert Speer described the difficulty Reichsministers had in dealing with the fiercely independent Gauleiters:

[the Gauleiters’] general attitude was that they were bound only by orders coming directly from Hitler. They would accept decisions by other agencies only as long as they suited them, but if the Gauleiters disapproved they simply failed to carry them out. This applied also to directives from the Reich Ministries … [if] an order or directive did not suit a Gauleiter he would immediately declare that he was taking orders from Hitler only. Bormann, in order to strengthen this attitude, issued most of his own orders in the name of the Führer.

In October 1944, the Nazi Party mobilized a national militia, the Volkssturm. Each Gauleiter was charged with the organization, enrollment, training and leadership of the Volkssturm battalions in their jurisdiction. These units were staffed by conscripting males between the ages of 16 and 60 who were not already serving in the military. The Volkssturm comprised one of the final components of the total war effort promulgated by Goebbels in his role of Reich Plenipotentiary for Total War.

Towards the end of the war, the Gauleiters, in their capacity as Reich Defense Commissioners, were given a key role in implementing Hitler's scorched earth policy as laid out in the Nero Decree of 19 March 1945. Many Gauleiters, knowing the war was lost, refused to carry out the orders, but several of the most fanatical among them ordered the destruction of bridges, utility plants, factories, and other important infrastructure ahead of the advancing Allied troops.

=== Background and characteristics ===
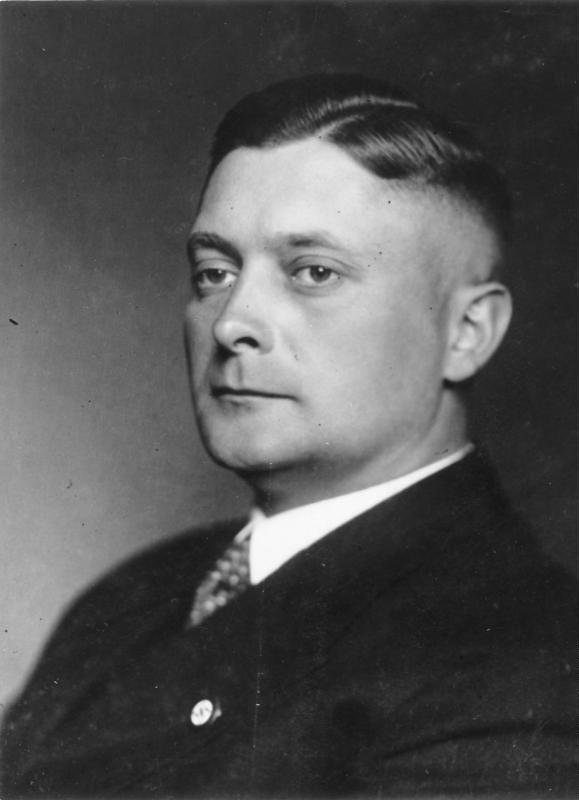
Karl Kaufmann was the Gauleiter of Hamburg, Germany's second most populous city, from 15 April 1929 to the end of the Nazi regime on 8 May 1945. He was also the Reichsstatthalter of Hamburg from 16 May 1933. After serving a prison sentence for war crimes, he became involved in neo-Nazi political activities in post-war West Germany.

Approximately 125 men held the position of Gauleiter. Many shared a common background. Most of them, particularly during the early years, were drawn from the cadre of "old fighters" that had helped Hitler forge the Party during the Kampfzeit (Time of Struggle). Most had been born in the last decade of the 19th century and came of age during World War I. They had fought in the war, and afterward many served in the paramilitary Freikorps, battling Communists and other left-wing groups. Most had at least a secondary school education and many had some higher education. Many were teachers or commercial clerks. Though advanced degrees were rare, there were some Ph.D.s, lawyers, medical doctors and a dentist among their numbers. Most were middle class, with very few from the proletarian working class. Many experienced interrupted education and careers that were not resumed because of their war service. Drawn to right wing, antisemitic and völkisch organizations, they gravitated to the Nazi Party in the immediate post-war years.

Those that were appointed in later years, particularly after the start of the Second World War, tended to be younger and better educated. Born in the first decade of the twentieth century, most were products of a later phase of the Party's development. They had some experience in the Party bureaucracy, either at the Gau level or in the Party Chancellery under Bormann, and were trained as administrators.

Though their tenure in office fluctuated, once the geographical re-organizations and personnel instability of the early years had passed, it was not unusual for Gauleiters to remain in their posts until they died. Though a small number were removed for corruption, cowardice or other malfeasance, a handful also managed to remain in office throughout the entire 20 years from 1925 to 1945.

Most Gauleiters were members of one or more of the Nazi Party's paramilitary units, the Sturmabteilung (SA), the Schutzstaffel (SS) or the National Socialist Motor Corps (NSKK) in which they usually carried the rank of Obergruppenführer.

Gauleiters comprised one-third of the Nazi Party electoral list for the parliamentary election of 1928 and were among the first 12 Nazis elected. After the Nazis came to power, Gauleiters routinely sat as deputies in the Reichstag. In addition, those whose Gaue were in Prussia were also made members of the Prussian State Council. This was a revised non-legislative advisory body established by Prussian Minister-president Hermann Göring in July 1933, and which replaced the earlier Prussian State Council, which had been the second chamber of the Prussian legislature.

=== Fate ===
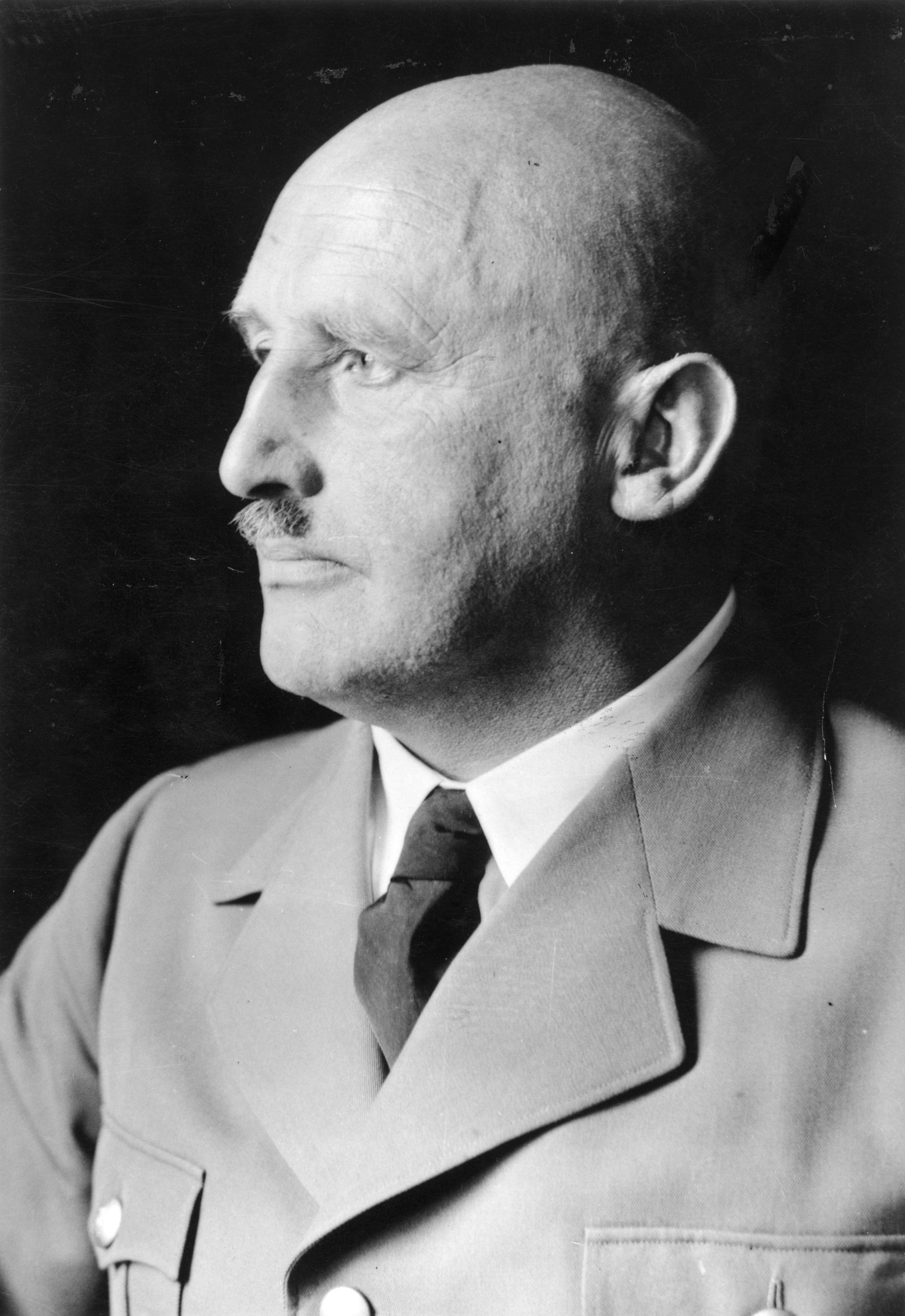
Julius Streicher was the Gauleiter in Nuremberg from 2 April 1925 until removed from office for corruption on 16 February 1940. A notorious and virulent antisemite, he was executed as a war criminal after the Nuremberg trials.

Of the 43 Gauleiters serving at the end of the Nazi regime in May 1945:

- Twelve committed suicide either before being captured or while in Allied custody.
- Two died in battles during the final weeks of the war.
- One was killed while escaping from Czech partisans.
- One went missing, was presumed captured by the Soviets and eventually declared dead by a German court.
- Eight were arrested, tried, convicted and executed as war criminals by the Nuremberg Trials, the Dachau Trials or the governments of the Allied nations.
- Sixteen were arrested, tried, convicted and imprisoned by these tribunals or special German denazification courts for war crimes or for their Nazi leadership role. One of these died in a Polish prison while serving a life sentence. The remaining fifteen served their sentences and were released.
- Two, though arrested, escaped from Allied custody, never faced trial and managed to flee to Italy or to Argentina.
- One went underground at the war's end, escaped to Canada and was never apprehended.

In addition, many former Gauleiters who had been either removed from office or promoted to other positions also committed suicide (four), died in captivity (four), were imprisoned and released (four), or executed (one).

== Insignia ==
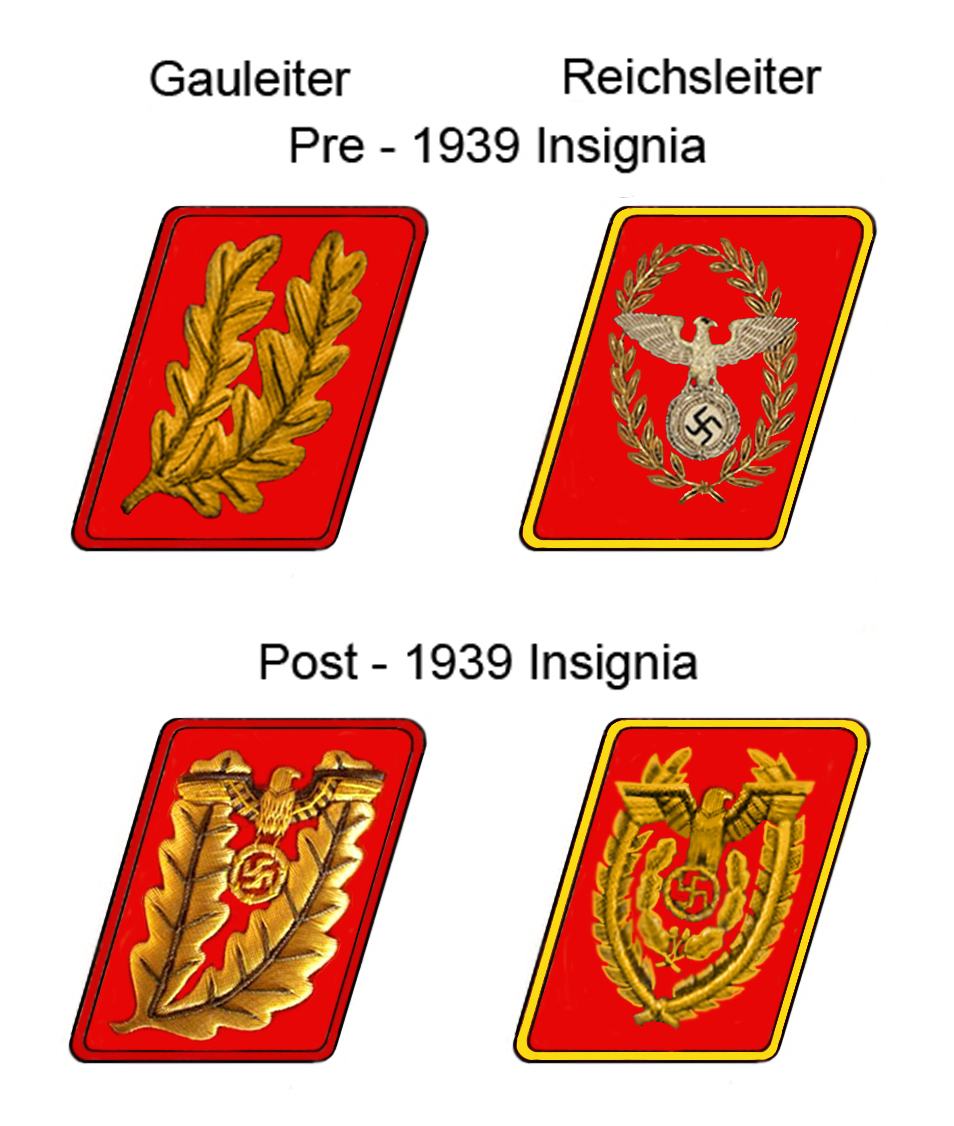
The rank insignia for Gauleiter and Reichsleiter, before and after the 1939 insignia change

By 1939, the entire Nazi Party paramilitary rank system had been overhauled, introducing completely new insignia consisting of pips, bars, and as many as four miniature oak leaves per collar to represent Nazi Party political rank. The Gauleiter insignia, however, was considered too well "entrenched" to change and thus was not incorporated into the new insignia system. Instead, the Gauleiter continued to wear the pre-war two oak leaf insignia, with the rank seen as existing outside of the hierarchy, senior to all other Nazi Party ranks, with the exception of Reichsleiter. Both Gauleiter and Reichsleiter insignia was modified slightly to display a more pronounced national eagle crest, and both ranks were permitted to wear special party armbands.

Each Gauleiter also had the right to display a special vehicle flag when traveling, as a symbol of his position.

=== Relationship with other insignia ===
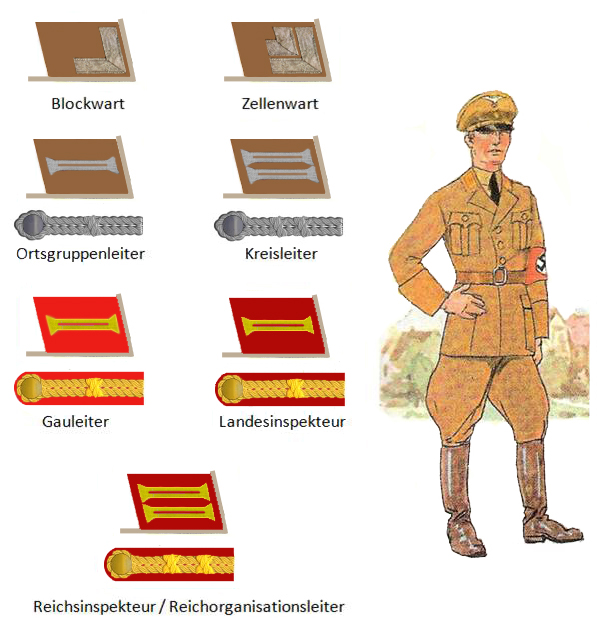
Early Nazi Party insignia from 1930, showing the first badge of rank for Gauleiter (centre-left, red background)

All political leaders working at the Gau level had rhomboid collar tabs with red facings (not brown), with a dark wine-red (burgundy) colored piping around the outer edges. Reich-level collar tabs had a bright crimson facing, with gold piping; Kreis level tabs had a dark chocolate brown facing, with white piping, while Ort level tabs had a light brown facing with light blue piping. The political leader collar-tab system was quite complicated and underwent four changes (complexity increasing with each change); the final (fourth) pattern as described above, was introduced around the end of 1938—by this time, with many more job positions within each level; this made the fourth pattern collar tab rank system by far the most complicated of all. The Gauleiter had authority over the district leaders (Kreisleiter), who in turn directed chapter leaders (Ortsgruppenleiter). An Ortsgruppe (chapter) encompassed 1500 households—usually a city suburb or a few villages. Chapter leaders directed cell leaders (Zellenleiter), responsible for 160 to 480 households. Zellenleiter had control over the lowest local leaders, Blockleiter, each of whom had charge of one block consisting of 40 to 60 households. The cell and block leaders at the bottom of the hierarchy gave the party a strong hold on the civilian populace.

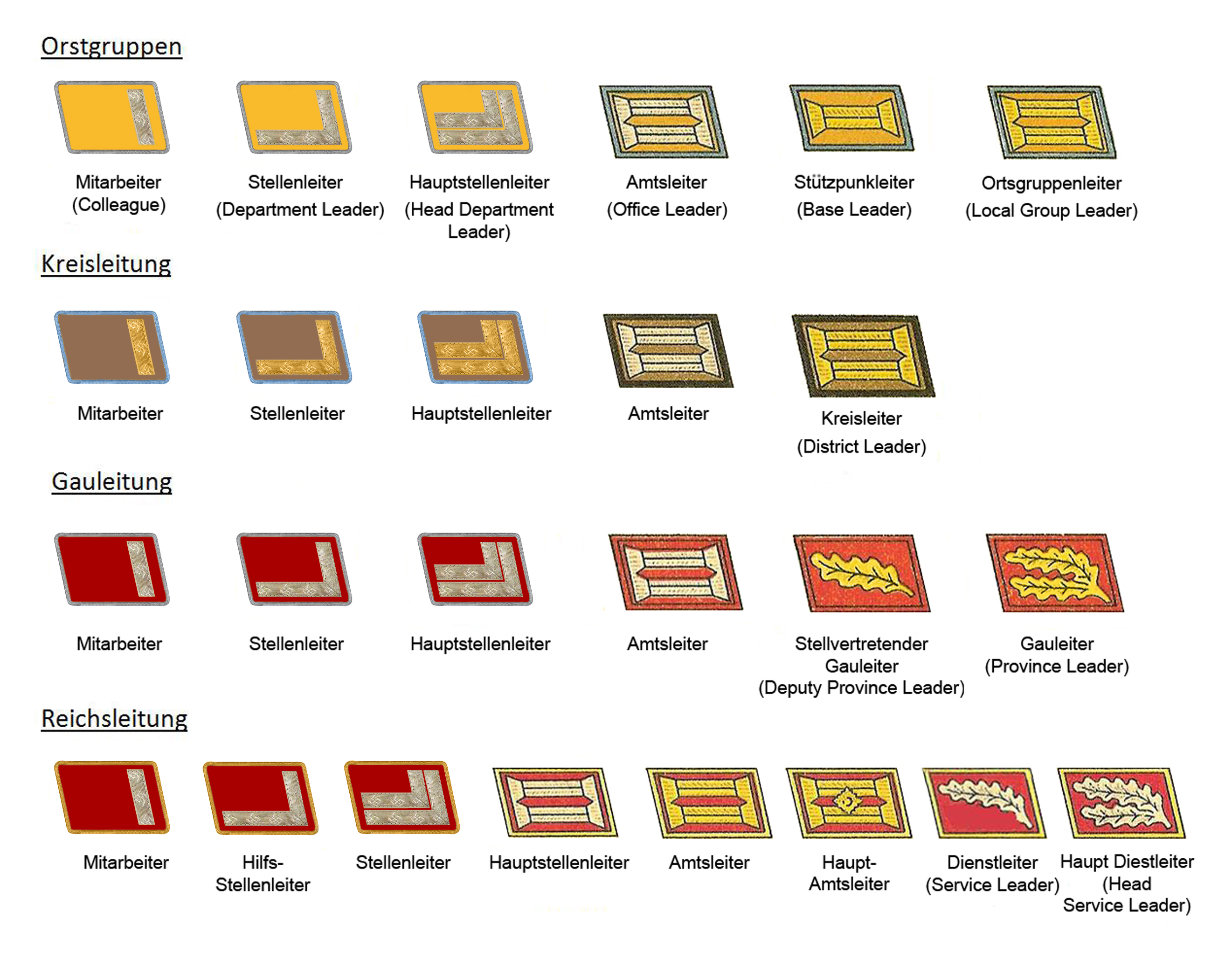
The rank insignia of the Nazi party in the 1930s; the Deputy Gauleiter insignia is displayed as a single oak leaf.

The original insignia for a Gauleiter consisted of Army-styled collar tabs, accompanied by a braided shoulder cord worn on a brown Nazi Party shirt. After 1933, the Gauleiter adopted a two oak leaf insignia worn on a brown colored collar patch. The Stellvertreter-Gauleiter (Deputy-Gauleiter) wore a single oak leaf.

== Deputy Gauleiter ==
The positional title immediately subordinate to the Gauleiter was the Stellvertreter-Gauleiter (Deputy Gau Leader). Between 1933 and 1939, this position was an actual rank, annotated by a single oak leaf collar patch, in contrast to the two used for the Gauleiter. Due to the infighting of Nazi party politics, regulations had been introduced by 1935 to prevent a Deputy Gauleiter from succeeding his own superior, thus discouraging acts of discrediting a Gauleiter in the hopes that the Deputy would take his place.

The World War II era Nazi ranks incorporated the Stellvertreter-Gauleiter rank as a positional title, paired with a corresponding Nazi Party paramilitary rank and doing away with the previous single leaf insignia and the actual rank of Deputy Gauleiter. Accordingly, with the single leaf political insignia discontinued, the insignia of Gauleiter displayed two leaves although a single leaf insignia no longer existed.

== See also ==
- List of Gauleiters

== General and cited references ==
- Broszat, Martin (1981). The Hitler State: The Foundation and Development of the Internal Structure of the Third Reich. New York: Longman Inc. ISBN 0-582-49200-9.
- Großer Atlas zur Weltgeschichte. Braunschweig: Georg Westermann Verlag. 1985. ISBN 3-14-100919-8.
- Höffkes, Karl (1986). Hitlers Politische Generale. Die Gauleiter des Dritten Reiches: ein biographisches Nachschlagewerk. Tübingen: Grabert-Verlag. ISBN 3-87847-163-7.
- Hüttenberger, Peter (1969). Die Gauleiter. Studie zum Wandel des Machtgefüges in der NSDAP. Stuttgart: Deutsche Verlags-Anstalt. ISBN 978-3-486-70364-1.
- Lilla, Joachim (2005). Der Preußische Staatsrat 1921–1933: Ein biographisches Handbuch. Düsseldorf: Droste Verlag. ISBN 978-3-770-05271-4.
- Miller, Michael D.; Schulz, Andreas (2012). Gauleiter: The Regional Leaders of the Nazi Party and Their Deputies, 1925-1945. Vol. 1 (Herbert Albrecht - H. Wilhelm Hüttmann). R. James Bender Publishing. ISBN 978-1-932970-21-0.
- Miller, Michael D.; Schulz, Andreas (2017). Gauleiter: The Regional Leaders of the Nazi Party and Their Deputies, 1925-1945. Vol. 2 (Georg Joel - Dr. Bernhard Rust). R. James Bender Publishing. ISBN 978-1-932970-32-6.
- Miller, Michael D.; Schulz, Andreas (2021). Gauleiter: The Regional Leaders of the Nazi Party and Their Deputies, 1925 - 1945. Vol. 3 (Fritz Sauckel - Hans Zimmermann). Fonthill Media. ISBN 978-1-78155-826-3.
- Millett, Allen R.; Murray, Williamson (2010). Military Effectiveness. Vol. 3. Cambridge University Press. ISBN 978-0-521-42591-9.
- Orlow, Dietrich (1969). The History of the Nazi Party: 1919-1933. University of Pittsburgh Press. ISBN 0-8229-3183-4.
- Orlow, Dietrich (1973). The History of the Nazi Party: 1933-1945. University of Pittsburgh Press. ISBN 0-822-9-3253-9.
- Snyder, Louis L. (1976). Encyclopedia of the Third Reich. McGraw Hill Inc. ISBN 978-1569249178.
- Wistrich, Robert (1982). Who's Who in Nazi Germany. Macmillan Publishing Co. ISBN 0-02-630600-X.
