= Hans Westmar =

1933 film

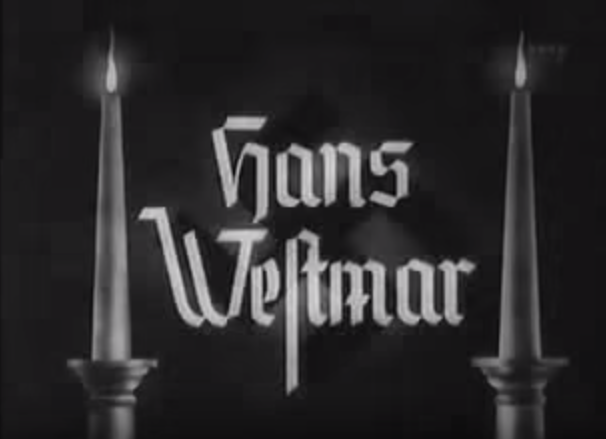
- Screenshot from German movie "Hans Westmar. One of many. A German Fate from the Year 1929"
- Directed by: Franz Wenzler
- Written by: Hanns Heinz Ewers
- Produced by: Robert Ernst
- Starring: Emil Lohkamp; Paul Wegener
- Cinematography: Franz Weihmayr
- Edited by: Alice Ludwig
- Music by: Giuseppe Becce; Ernst Hanfstaengl
- Production company: Volksdeutsche Filmgesellschaft
- Distributed by: Siegel-Monopolfilm
- Release date: 13 December 1933
- Running time: 132 minutes
- Country: Nazi Germany
- Language: German

Hans Westmar (full title: Hans Westmar. Einer von vielen. Ein deutsches Schicksal aus dem Jahre 1929 "Hans Westmar. One of many. A German Fate from the Year 1929") was the last of an unofficial trilogy of films produced by the Nazis shortly after coming to power in January 1933, celebrating their Kampfzeit – the history of their period in opposition, struggling to gain power. The film is a partially fictionalized biography of the Nazi martyr Horst Wessel.

== Plot ==
The film concentrates on the conflict with the Communist Party of Germany in Berlin in the late 1920s. When Westmar arrives in Berlin, the communists are popular, hold large parades through Berlin and sing "The Internationale". When he looks into the cultural life of Weimar Berlin, he is horrified at the "internationalism" and cultural promiscuity, which includes black jazz music and Jewish nightclub singers. That scene dissolves into images of the German fighting men of World War I and shots of the cemeteries of the German dead.

Westmar decides to help organize the local Nazi Party and becomes, through the course of the plot, responsible for its electoral victories, which encourages the Communists to kill him.

== Production ==
The recently established Volksdeutsche Filmgesellschaft produced the film based on Hanns Heinz Ewers' novelistic biography of Horst Wessel. It was among the first films to depict dying for Hitler as a glorious death for Germany and as resulting in his spirit inspiring his comrades. His decision to go to the streets is presented as fighting "the real battle".

This was the third adaption of Wessel's life after being covered in Blutendes Deutschland and a short made by Franz Wenzler in 1932. Wenzler was the director and Richard Fiedler, a SA-Oberführer, oversaw the film's production. Giuseppe Becce and Ernst Hanfstaengl, a friend of Adolf Hitler, composed the music. Hertha Thiele declined an offer to star in the film. The end scene at the Brandenburg Gate was originally shot in color in August 1933.

Along with S.A.-Mann Brand and Hitlerjunge Quex, Hans Westmar was the last of the trilogy of films released in 1933, and designed to present an idealized account of the Nazis' 'heroic struggle' to come to power in Germany.

== Release ==
Hans Westmar was shown to a group of Nazi leaders, including Hermann Göring, on 3 October 1933. It was met with praise, with Jules Sauerwein writing in Deutsche Allgemeine Zeitung that it was "one of the best he had ever seen". The film was scheduled to be released on 9 October, Wessel's birthday.

The film was banned on 9 October, the same day as its premiere, since Wessel was shown in prostitution and in a Christian milieu. According to the Nazi Film Review Office the film "does neither do justice to Horst Wessel's personality nor to the national socialist movement as the leader of the state".

Goebbels justified the ban as follows:

"As national socialists we do not particularly value to watch our SA men marching on stage or screen. Their realm is the street. Should however somebody try to solve national socialist problems in the realm of art, he must understand that also in this case the art does not come from ambition but ability. Even an ostentatious display of a national socialist attitude is no substitute for an absence of true art. The national socialist government has never demanded the production of SA-movies. On the contrary: we see a danger in this excess. […] In no way does national socialism justify artistic failure. The greater the idea that shall find a form the greater the aesthetic demands have to be."

Goebbels allowed the film to be shown on the condition that the title be changed from Horst Wessel to Hans Westmar, its full title was Hans Westmar. Einer von vielen. Ein deutsches Schicksal aus dem Jahre 1929. Scenes covering the creation of "Horst-Wessel-Lied" were removed. It was approved by the censors on 23 November and released on 13 December.

One reason may have been to avoid "de-mystifying" Wessel. Part of the problem was that authentic depiction of Stormtroopers, including picking fights with Communists, did not fit the more reasonable tone that the Nazis adopted in power and would undermine Volksgemeinschaft. The fictionalised Westmar, unlike Wessel, does not alienate his family. It was released in the United States in 1939.

== See also ==
- List of German films 1919–1933
- List of German films 1933–1945
- Nazism and cinema

== Works cited ==
- Hull, David (1969). Film in the Third Reich: Art and Propaganda in Nazi Germany. Simon & Schuster. SBN 671214861.
- Waldman, Harry (2008). Nazi Films In America, 1933-1942. McFarland & Company. ISBN 9780786438617.
- Welch, David (1983). Propaganda and the German Cinema: 1933-1945. I.B. Tauris. ISBN 9781860645204.
