= Fiddler (disambiguation) =

A fiddler is a person who plays a fiddle or violin.

Fiddler may also refer to:

== People ==
- Alvin Fiddler, Canadian Anisininew politician
- Amp Fiddler (1958–2023), American funk and soul musician, born Joseph Fiddler
- Blake Fiddler (born 2007), American ice hockey player
- Nancy Fiddler (born 1956), American cross country skier
- Ronald Fiddler (1966–2017), British Guantanamo Bay detainee and suicide bomber
- Vernon Fiddler (born 1980), Canadian hockey player

== Arts, entertainment, and media ==
=== Fictional characters ===
- Fiddler (comics), a DC Comics villain
- Fiddler (mystery series), a character in a mystery series by A.E. Maxwell

=== Music ===
- Fabrangen Fiddlers, an American musical group founded in 1971
- Fiddler Records, a record label

=== Productions ===
- Fiddler on the Roof (1964), a Broadway musical often referred to as "Fiddler"
  - Fiddler on the Roof (film), the 1971 film version of the musical

== Science ==
- Fiddler crab, a species of crab found in parts of the Atlantic and Pacific oceans
- Fiddler ray, a type of ray found on the south and east coasts of Australia

== Other uses ==
- Fiddler (software), a tool acquired by Telerik in 2012; now part of Progress Software
- Tupolev Tu-28 (NATO reporting name: Fiddler), a Soviet fighter aircraft
- The Fiddler, painting of Marc Chagall
- USNS Marine Fiddler, a cargo ship in the United States Merchant Marine during the Korean War and Vietnam War

== See also ==
- Fiddler's Green (disambiguation)
- Fiedler, German translation of surname
- Fidler
