= Karl Ernst =

German SA leader (1904–1934)

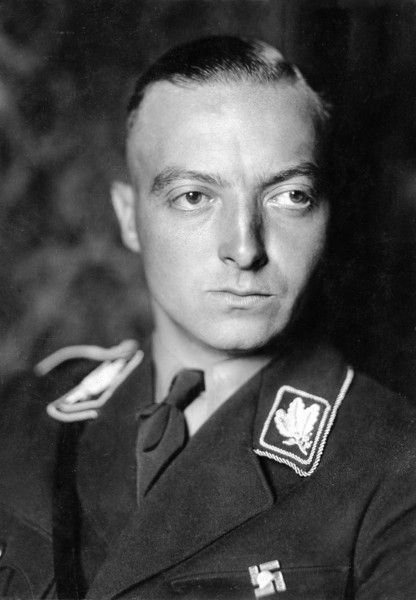
- Ernst in 1933

Führer, SA-Gruppe Berlin-Brandenburg
- In office 15 March 1933 – 30 June 1934

Additional positions
- 1933–1934: Prussian State Councilor
- 1933–1934: Reichstag Deputy
- 1932–1933: Reichstag Deputy

Personal details
- Born: 1 September 1904 Berlin, Kingdom of Prussia, German Empire
- Died: 30 June 1934 (aged 29) Berlin, Free State of Prussia, Nazi Germany
- Cause of death: Execution by firing squad
- Occupation: Nazi paramilitary officer

Karl Gustav Ernst (1 September 1904 – 30 June 1934) was an SA-Gruppenführer who, from March 1933, was the SA commander in Berlin. Prior to joining the Nazi Party, he had been a hotel bellhop and a bouncer at gay nightclubs. He was one of the chief participants in the extrajudicial execution of Albrecht Höhler. Ernst was himself extrajudicially executed in the Night of the Long Knives.

== Early years ==
Karl Ernst was born in Berlin in 1904, the son of a cavalryman. After attending Volksschule in Berlin-Wilmersdorf and Berlin-Grunewald, he completed a commercial apprenticeship as an export merchant between 1918 and 1921. He became involved in the national youth movement in 1918, joining the Großdeutscher Jugendbund, a right-wing youth association, and also the Freikorps “Eskadron Grunewald”. Until 1923, he worked as a commercial clerk in Berlin and Mainz. In the same year, he joined the Sturmabteilung (SA), the paramilitary unit of the Nazi Party.

After the failure of the Munich Putsch of November 1923 and the ban on the Nazi Party, Ernst was active in various other right-wing anti-democratic organizations opposed to the Weimar Republic, such as the Viking League. Between 1924 and 1926, he also was a member of the Frontbann, a front organization of the banned SA, and in the organization "Ulrich von Hutten" of the Freikorps leader Gerhard Roßbach. Professionally, Ernst pursued various jobs in the service industry during these years. He was successively a commercial clerk, bank clerk, buyer, secretary, correspondent, waiter and bellboy in Berlin, Mainz and Danzig.

== SA career ==
From 1927 to March 1931, Ernst worked on the staff of the Supreme SA Leadership in Munich. Following the Stennes Revolt, an upheaval and resultant purge within the Berlin SA, Ernst was named the adjutant of the Berlin Gausturm in April 1931 and joined the Nazi Party (membership number 446,153). As adjutant, Ernst helped the Berlin commander Wolf-Heinrich Graf von Helldorff in preparing and carrying out the antisemitic Kurfürstendamm riot of 12 September 1931. On the evening of the Jewish New Year celebrations, around 1,000 SA men attacked Jews leaving the synagogue and passers-by on the Kurfürstendamm. Charges of breach of the peace were brought against Helldorff and Ernst, who had initially gone into hiding. Defended by Roland Freisler and Hans Frank, both were sentenced to six months in prison in November 1931. This judgment was overturned in February 1932 and Ernst paid a fine.

From 14 October to 14 December 1931, Ernst was the Stabsführer (staff leader) of the reorganized SA-Gruppe Berlin-Brandenburg. On 15 December 1931, he became the adjutant of this SA-Gruppe, holding this post until April 1932 with the rank of SA-Oberführer. From July 1932 to March 1933 he commanded the SA-Untergruppe Berlin Ost. Promoted to SA-Gruppenführer on 1 March 1933, he became Helldorff's successor as Führer of SA-Gruppe Berlin–Brandenburg on 15 March. He now commanded all SA troops in the capital area and the Province of Brandenburg as the representative of the SA Supreme Command. This also gave him direct control over the SA field police, which were directly involved in the persecution of opponents of the regime. On 20 September 1933, Ernst led a group of SA and SS men in the seizure and summary killing of Albrecht Höhler, a Communist imprisoned for the murder of Horst Wessel.

Ernst was elected as a Nazi deputy to the Reichstag for electoral constituency 3 (Potsdam II) at the July 1932 German federal election and reelected in November 1932. Switching to constituency 2 (Berlin), he was reelected in March and November 1933. On 4 August 1933, Ernst was appointed to the Prussian State Council by Prussian Minister President Hermann Göring.

== Reichstag fire ==
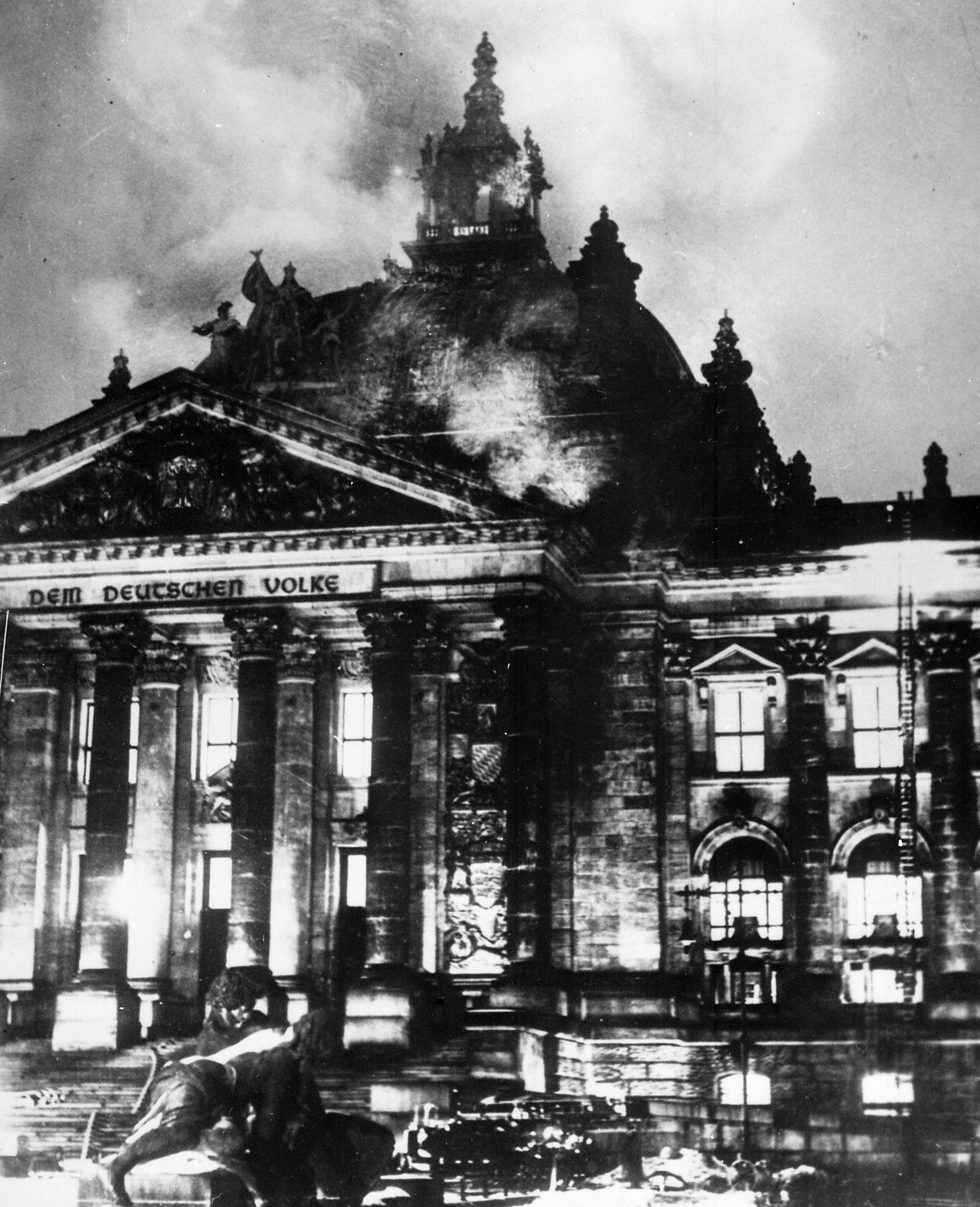
Reichstag fire of February 1933

It has been suggested that it was Ernst who, with a small party of stormtroopers, traversed a passage from the Palace of the President of the Reichstag, and set the Reichstag building on fire on the night of 27 February 1933. There is evidence indirectly to substantiate this: Gisevius at Nuremberg implicated Goebbels in planning the fire, Rudolph Diels stated that Göring knew how the fire was to be started, and General Franz Halder stated that he had heard Göring claim responsibility for the fire. However, according to Ian Kershaw, the consensus of nearly all historians is that Marinus van der Lubbe did set the Reichstag on fire.

== Night of the Long Knives ==
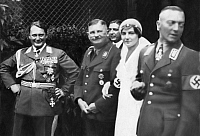
Karl Ernst (r.) and his bride with his best men, Hermann Göring and Ernst Röhm, May 1934

On 30 June 1934, Ernst had just recently married and was in Bremen on his way to Tenerife to honeymoon with his new wife. SA Leader Ernst Röhm had repeatedly called for a "second revolution" that would introduce socialism into the Reich and banish the old Conservative forces of business and government. Fearing the socialistic tendencies of the SA, along with Röhm's ambition to absorb the Reichswehr into the SA, conservative elements in the German Army and Kriegsmarine (navy) pressed for elimination of SA power. Adolf Hitler undertook a purge of the SA, an event known to history as the Night of the Long Knives. It lasted until 2 July 1934.

Ernst was arrested and brutally beaten in Bremerhaven together with his wife and his friend Martin Kirschbaum as he was about to get aboard a navy cruiser in order to travel to Tenerife where he planned to spend his honeymoon. Later on, he was handed over in Bonn to an SS unit led by Kurt Gildisch where he was tortured and interrogated. He was then flown back to Berlin and taken to the barracks of the Leibstandarte Adolf Hitler, where he was shot by a firing squad in the early evening of 30 June. According to the official death list drawn up for internal-administrative use by the Gestapo, he was one of fourteen people shot on the grounds of the Leibstandarte.

== See also ==
- SA-Gruppe Berlin-Brandenburg
- Information about Karl Ernst in the Reichstag database

== Sources ==
- Hannover, Heinrich [in German]; Hannover-Drück, Elisabeth [in German] (1977). Politische Justiz 1918-1933 [Political Justice 1918-1933] (in German) (2nd ed.). Hamburg: Attica-Verlag. ISBN 3-88235-001-6.
- Harrison, Ted (1997). Bracher, Karl Dietrich; Schwarz, Hans-Peter [in German]; Möller, Horst (eds.). "'Alter Kämpfer' im Widerstand. Graf Helldorff, die NS-Bewegung und die Opposition gegen Hitler" ['Old fighter' in the Resistance. Graf Helldorff, the Nazi Movement and the Opposition to Hitler] (PDF). Vierteljahrshefte für Zeitgeschichte (in German). 45 (3, Juli). Munich: Institut für Zeitgeschichte: 385–423. ISSN 0042-5702.
- Kershaw, Ian (1998). Hitler 1889–1936: Hubris. London: Penguin.
- Lilla, Joachim [in German] (2005). Der Preußische Staatsrat 1921–1933: Ein biographisches Handbuch (in German). Düsseldorf: Droste Verlag. ISBN 978-3-770-05271-4.
- Shirer, William Lawrence (1960). The Rise and Fall of the Third Reich: A History of Nazi Germany. New York City: Simon & Schuster. ASIN B0766DKDLR. LCCN 60006729. OCLC 1286630. OL 5794925M. Wikidata Q138029595.
- Siemens, Daniel [in German] (2013). "Revenge of the Nazis". The Making of a Nazi Hero: The Murder and Myth of Horst Wessel. London: I.B.Tauris. pp. 185–202. ISBN 978-1-78076-077-3.
- Wheeler-Bennett, John (2005) [1967]. The Nemesis of Power: The German Army in Politics 1918–1945. Palgrave Macmillan.
