= Fiedler =

Fiedler is a German word for "fiddler", and is a German and Ashkenazi Jewish surname. Notable people with the surname include:

- Adolf Gottlieb Fiedler (1771–1850), German entrepreneur in Saxony and Poland
- Arkady Fiedler (1894–1985), Polish writer
- Arthur Fiedler (1894–1979), American conductor
- Bernhard Fiedler (1816–1904), German painter
- Bernold Fiedler (born 1956), German mathematician
- Bobbi Fiedler (1937–2019), American politician
- Christian Fiedler (born 1975), former German football goalkeeper
- Edgar Fiedler (1929–2003), American economist
- Ellen Fiedler (born 1958), German athlete
- François Fiedler (1921–2001), Abstract Expressionist Painter
- Franz Fiedler (1885–1956), Austrian photographer
- Fred Fiedler ( 1922 –2017), industrial and organizational psychologist
  - Fiedler contingency model, a leadership theory developed by Fred Fiedler
- Fritz Fiedler (1899–1972), German automobile engineer
- Hermann Georg Fiedler (1862–1945), German scholar
- Jay Fiedler (born 1971), American football quarterback
- Jens Fiedler (canoeist), East German sprint canoeist
- Jens Fiedler (cyclist), German cyclist
- John Fiedler (1925–2005), American actor
- Joshua Fiedler (born 1978), American musician
- Konrad Fiedler (1841-1895), German art historian and writer.
- Leslie Fiedler (1917–2003), American literary critic
- Margaret Fiedler, London-based American musician
- Max Fiedler (1859–1939), German conductor and composer
- Miroslav Fiedler (1926–2015), Czech mathematician
- Patrick Fiedler (born 1953), American lawyer and judge.
- Richard Fiedler (1908–1974), German SS-Brigadeführer
- Richard Fiedler, German scientist and engineer who invented the flame thrower
- Sebastian Fiedler (born 1973), German police investigator and politician
- Wolfgang Fiedler (1951-2025), German politician

== See also ==
- Fiddler (disambiguation)
- Fidler
