= Fidler =

Fidler is a surname. Notable people with the surname include:

== People ==
- Alwyn Sheppard Fidler CBE (1909–1990), Welsh architect and town planner, chief architect for the new town of Crawley from 1947 to 1952
- Artyom Fidler (born 1983), Russian professional footballer
- Bohumil Fidler (also Fiedler) (1860–1944), Czech composer, choirmaster, choral conductor and music teacher
- Dennis Fidler (1938–2015), English former footballer
- Eugene Fidler, French painter and ceramicist
- Isabel Fidler MBE (1869–1952), Australian academic and advocate for women's education
- Jennifer Fidler, American politician in Alabama
- Jim Fidler (born 1960), singer, producer, and musician living in St. John's, Newfoundland and Labrador
- Jimmie Fidler (1900–1988), American columnist, journalist and radio and television personality
- Lewis Fidler (1956–2019), New York City Councilman
- Michael Fidler (1916–1989), British Conservative Party politician
- Mike Fidler (born 1956), retired professional ice hockey player
- Pete Fidler, dobro player from Melbourne, Australia
- Peter Fidler (explorer) (1769–1822), British surveyor, mapmaker, chief fur trader and explorer
- Richard Fidler (born 1964), well-known Australian Republican and Australian ABC TV and radio presenter

== See also ==
- Fiddler (disambiguation)
- Fiedler
- Fidler's Mill, historic grist mill located at Arlington, Upshur County, West Virginia, United States
- Lake Fidler, meromictic lake beside the Gordon River in the Wilderness World Heritage area of the west coast of Tasmania, Australia
