= Turn Your Radio On =

Turn Your Radio On may refer to:

- "Hello (Turn Your Radio On)", a song by the British-based pop duo Shakespears Sister
- Turn Your Radio On, a radio program broadcast on WFAY-AM
- "Turn Your Radio On", a song written by Albert E. Brumley
  - "Turn Your Radio On", the Albert E. Brumley song on John Hartford's 1971 album Aereo-Plain
  - "Turn Your Radio On", the Albert E. Brumley song on Merle Haggard's 1971 album The Land of Many Churches
  - "Turn Your Radio On", the Albert E. Brumley song on Randy Travis' 2003 album Worship & Faith
  - "Turn Your Radio On", the Albert E. Brumley song on Cledus T. Judd's 2007 album Boogity, Boogity – A Tribute to the Comedic Genius of Ray Stevens
  - Turn Your Radio On (album), Ray Stevens' eighth studio album featuring and named for Albert E. Brumley's song
- Turn Your Radio On, a 1993 album by James Blackwood
- Turn Your Radio On, a 1993 album by Bill and Gloria Gaither
- Turn Your Radio On, a 2009 album by Pete Fidler
- Turn Your Radio On, a 1973 album by The Blackwood Brothers
- Turn Your Radio On, a 2008 BBC radio documentary produced by Hilary Robinson

== See also ==
- Turn on Your Radio, the sixth and final studio album by the Italian/U.S. ensemble Change
