= Horst-Wessel-Lied =

Anthem of the Nazi Party (1930-1945)

English: 'Horst Wessel Song'
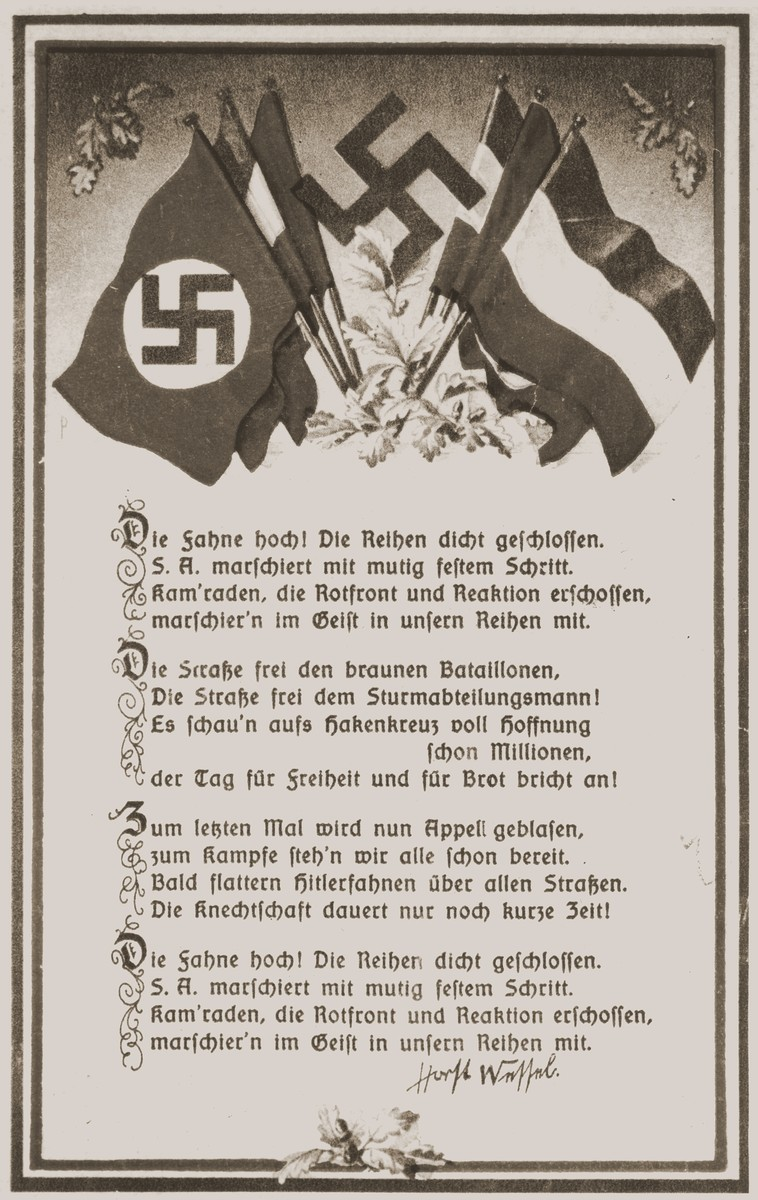
- "Horst-Wessel-Lied" postcard with lyrics
- Former co-national anthem of Nazi Germany
- Also known as: "Die Fahne hoch" (English: "The Flag High")
- Lyrics: Horst Wessel, 1929
- Published: 1929
- Adopted: 1933
- Relinquished: 1945
- Preceded by: "Deutschlandlied" (as sole national anthem)
- Succeeded by: "Ich hab' mich ergeben" (by West Germany); "Auferstanden aus Ruinen" (by East Germany); "Land der Berge, Land am Strome" (by Austria)

Audio sample
- 1933 vocal rendition by the Grosses Blas-Orchester und Chor, conducted by Carl Woitschach: file; help

The "Horst-Wessel-Lied" (German: [hɔʁst ˈvɛsl̩ liːt]), also known by its incipit "Die Fahne hoch" ([diː ˈfaːnə hoːx], lit. 'The Flag [Raised] High'), was the anthem of the Nazi Party (NSDAP) from 1930 to 1945. From 1933 to 1945, the Nazis made it the co-national anthem of Germany, along with the first stanza of the "Deutschlandlied".

The "Horst-Wessel-Lied" has been banned in Germany and Austria since the end of World War II unless for artistic or educational purposes.

== History ==
"Horst Wessel Lied"
Instrumental rendition of the "Horst Wessel Lied" in B-flat major.

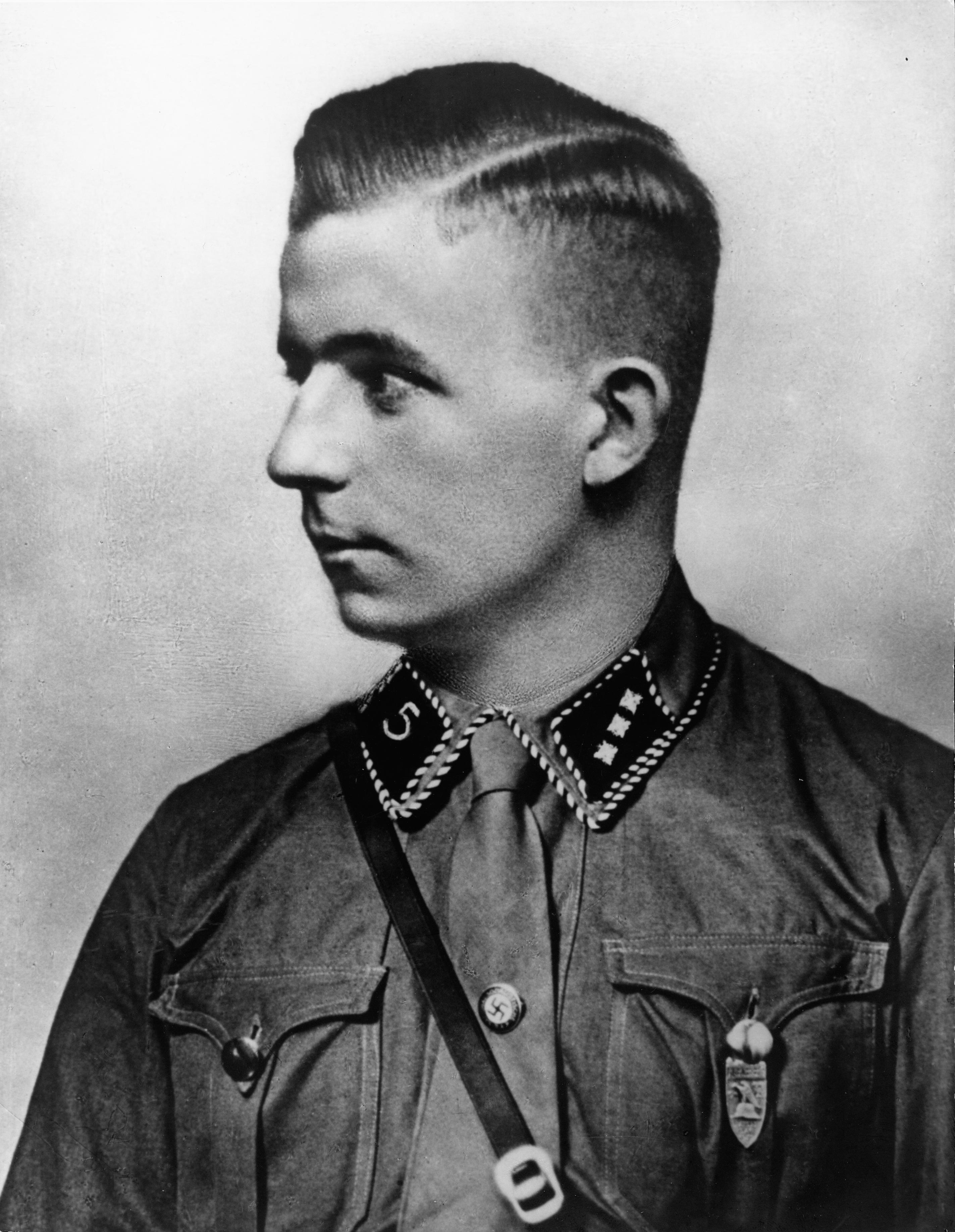
Horst Wessel, credited as writing the lyrics of the "Horst Wessel Song"

The lyrics to "Horst-Wessel-Lied" were written in 1929 by Sturmführer Horst Wessel, a commander of the Nazi paramilitary "Brownshirts" (Sturmabteilung [SA]) in the Friedrichshain district of Berlin, Germany. Wessel wrote songs for the SA in conscious imitation of the Communist paramilitary, the Red Front Fighters' League, to provoke them into attacking his troops, and to keep up the spirits of his men.

=== Horst Wessel ===
Wessel was the son of a pastor and educated at degree level, but was employed as a construction worker. He became notorious among the Communists when he led a number of SA attacks into the Fischerkiez, an extremely poor Berlin district, which he did on orders from Joseph Goebbels, who was then the Nazi Gauleiter (regional party leader) of Berlin. Several of these incursions were only minor altercations, but one took place outside the tavern which the local German Communist Party (KPD) used as its headquarters. As a result of that melee, five Communists were injured, four of them seriously. Communist newspapers accused the police of letting the Nazis get away while arresting the injured Communists, while Nazi newspapers claimed that Wessel had been trying to give a speech when Communists emerged and started the fight. Wessel's face was printed together with his address on Communist street posters. The slogan of the KPD and the Red Front Fighters' League became "strike the fascists wherever you find them".

Wessel moved with his partner Erna Jänicke into a room on Große Frankfurter Straße. The landlady was the widowed Mrs. Salm, whose husband had been a Communist. After a few months, there was a dispute between Salm and Wessel over unpaid rent. Salm requested Wessel's partner to leave but Jänicke refused. Salm appealed to Communist friends of her late husband for help. Shortly thereafter on 14 January 1930, Wessel was shot and seriously wounded by two Communist Party members, one of whom was Albrecht "Ali" Höhler. Wessel died in hospital on 23 February from blood poisoning, which he contracted during his hospitalisation. Höhler was tried in court and sentenced to six years' imprisonment for the shooting. After the Nazi accession to national power, he was taken out of prison under false pretenses by the SA in September 1933 and shot dead.

=== Nazi Party anthem ===
Joseph Goebbels, the Nazi Gauleiter and owner and editor of the newspaper Der Angriff ('The Attack'), had made several attempts to create Nazi martyrs for propaganda purposes, the first being an SA man named Hans-Georg Kütemeyer, whose body was pulled out of a canal the morning after he attended a speech by Hitler at the Sportpalast. Goebbels attempted to spin this into an assassination by Communists, but the overwhelming evidence showed it to have been suicide, and he had to drop the matter. Thus, Goebbels put considerable effort into mythologizing Wessel's story, even as the man lay dying. He met with Wessel's mother, who told him her son's life story, his hope for a "better world", and his attempt to rescue a prostitute he had met on the street. Goebbels saw Wessel as an "idealistic dreamer".

Wessel himself had undergone an operation at St. Joseph's Hospital which stopped his internal bleeding, but the surgeons had been unable to remove the bullet in his cerebellum. Wessel was brought to his mother's home to die. In his diary, Goebbels described Wessel's entire face as being shot up and his features distorted, and claimed that Wessel told him "One has to keep going! I'm happy!" After a period where his condition stabilized, Wessel died on 23 February.

Goebbels consulted Hermann Göring and others in the party on how to respond to Wessel's death. They declared a period of mourning until 12 March, during which party and SA members would avoid amusements and Wessel's name would be invoked at all party meetings. Wessel's unit was renamed the Horst Wessel Storm Unit 5.

From a mixture of fact and fiction, Goebbels' propaganda created what became one of the Nazi Party's central martyr-figures of their movement. He officially declared Wessel's march, renamed as the "Horst-Wessel-Lied" ("Horst Wessel Song"), to be the Nazi Party anthem, which aided in promoting Wessel as the first of many in the Nazi cult of martyrdom. Wessel was buried on 1 March 1930. Contrary to Nazi claims, there were no attacks on the funeral procession. His funeral was filmed and turned into a major propaganda event by the NSDAP. The "Horst Wessel Song" was sung by the SA at the funeral, and was thereafter extensively used at party functions, as well as sung by the SA during street parades.

According to Austrian historian Oliver Rathkolb, the song was created as a counterweight to the socialist song The Internationale.

=== Co-national anthem ===
After Adolf Hitler became the Chancellor of Germany in January 1933, the "Horst Wessel Song" became a national symbol by law on 19 May 1933. The following year, a regulation required the right arm be extended and raised in the "Nazi salute" when the (identical) first and fourth verses were sung. Nazi leaders can be seen singing the song at the finale of Leni Riefenstahl's 1935 film Triumph of the Will. Hitler also mandated the tempo at which the song had to be played. Following Hitler's public speeches, he would exit during the playing of both the national anthem and then the Horst Wessel Song.

Some Nazis were extremely sensitive about the uses to which the "Horst Wessel Song" was put. For instance, a bandleader who wrote a jazz version of the song was forced to leave Germany, and when Martha Dodd, the daughter of William E. Dodd, at the time the US ambassador to Germany, played a recording of an unusual arrangement of the song at her birthday party at the Ambassador's residence in 1933, a young Nazi, who was a liaison between the German Foreign Ministry and Hitler's Chancellery, turned off the record player, announcing "This is not the sort of music to be played for mixed gatherings and in a flippant manner." The song was played in some Protestant places of worship, because some elements of the Protestant Church in Germany had accepted the Horst Wessel cult, built as it was by Goebbels on the model of Christian martyrs of the past.

=== Post-World War II ===
With the end of the Nazi regime in May 1945, the "Horst Wessel Song" was banned. The lyrics and tune are now illegal in Germany, with some limited exceptions. In early 2011, this resulted in a Lower Saxony State Police investigation of Amazon.com and Apple Inc. for offering the song for sale on their websites. Both Apple and Amazon complied with the government's request and deleted the song from their offerings.

A special marine commando unit within the Chilean Navy uses the same melody as the Horst-Wessel-Lied with different lyrics called "Himno de la Agrupación de Comandos IM no. 51".

== Lyrics ==
The words to the "Horst Wessel Song" were published in September 1929 in the Nazi Party's Berlin newspaper, Der Angriff ('The Attack') which Joseph Goebbels owned and ran.

German original

Die Fahne hoch! Die Reihen fest geschlossen! (Note: Also: "dicht geschlossen" or "sind geschlossen")
SA marschiert mit ruhig festem Schritt. (Note: Also: "mutig festem")
𝄆 Kam'raden, die Rotfront und Reaktion erschossen,
Marschier'n im Geist in unser'n Reihen mit.𝄇

Die Straße frei den braunen Bataillonen.
Die Straße frei dem Sturmabteilungsmann!
𝄆Es schau'n aufs Hakenkreuz voll Hoffnung schon Millionen.
Der Tag für Freiheit und für Brot bricht an!𝄇 (Note: Also: "Tag der Freiheit")

Zum letzten Mal wird Sturmalarm geblasen! (Note: Also: "Sturmappell")
Zum Kampfe steh'n wir alle schon bereit!
𝄆Schon flattern Hitlerfahnen über allen Straßen. (Note: Also: "Schon bald flattern Hitlerfahnen über Barrikaden")
Die Knechtschaft dauert nur noch kurze Zeit!𝄇

English translation

Raise the flag! The ranks tightly closed!
The SA marches with calm, steady step.
Comrades shot by the Red Front and reactionaries
March in spirit within our ranks.

Clear the streets for the brown battalions,
Clear the streets for the storm division man!
Millions are looking upon the swastika full of hope,
The day of freedom and of bread dawns!

For the last time, the call to arms is sounded!
For the fight, we all stand prepared!
Already Hitler's banners fly over all streets.
The time of bondage will last but a little while now!

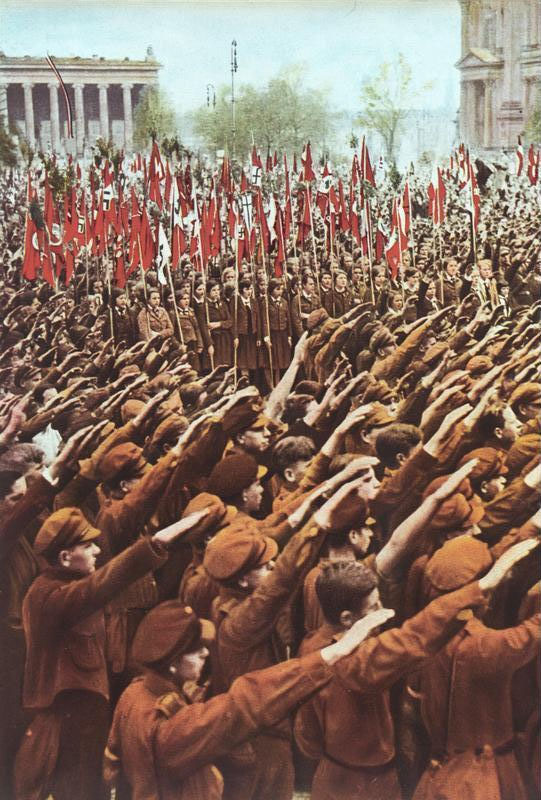
Hitler Youth giving the Nazi salute; Germans were required by law to make the salute during the singing of the "Horst Wessel Song"

The Rotfront, or "Red Front", was the Rotfrontkämpferbund, the paramilitary organization of the Communist Party of Germany. The Nazi SA (also known as the "brown shirts" after their uniforms) and the Communist Red Front fought each other in violent street confrontations, which grew into almost open warfare after 1930. The "reactionaries" were the conservative political parties and the liberal democratic German government of the Weimar Republic period, which made several unsuccessful attempts to suppress the SA. The "time of bondage" refers to the period after the 1919 Treaty of Versailles, in which the victorious powers imposed huge reparations on Germany, stripped it of its colonies in Africa, Asia, and the Pacific Ocean, some of which became League of Nations mandates, gave parts of Germany to Belgium, Denmark, France, Poland, and Lithuania, and occupied the Rhineland.

The line Kameraden, die Rotfront und Reaktion erschossen is technically ambiguous. It could either mean Kameraden, die von Rotfront und Reaktion erschossen wurden ("Our comrades who were shot dead by the Red Front and Reactionaries") or Kameraden, welche die Erschießung von Rotfront und Reaktion durchführten ("Our comrades who have shot the Red Front and Reactionaries dead"). Despite this obvious syntactic problem, which was mentioned by Victor Klemperer in his LTI – Lingua Tertii Imperii, the line was never changed. The following line Marschier'n im Geist in unser'n Reihen mit (March in spirit within our ranks), however, indicates that the aforementioned comrades are deceased, advocating the first interpretation.

Some changes were made to the lyrics following Wessel's death:

Stanza 1, line 2

SA marschiert mit mutig-festem Schritt
SA marschiert mit ruhig festem Schritt

The storm battalion march with bold, firm step.
The stormtroopers march with calm, firm step.

Stanza 3, line 1

Zum letzten Mal wird nun Appell geblasen!
Zum letzten Mal wird Sturmalarm geblasen!

The call is sounded for the last time!
The last sound to charge is blown!

Stanza 3, line 3

Bald flattern Hitlerfahnen über Barrikaden
Schon/bald flattern Hitler-Fahnen über allen Straßen

Soon Hitler's banners will flutter above the barricades
Already/Soon Hitler's banners will flutter above all streets

Following Wessel's death, new stanzas were added, composed in his honour. These were frequently sung by the SA but did not become part of the official lyrics used on party or state occasions.

Sei mir gegrüßt, Du starbst den Tod der Ehre!
Horst Wessel fiel, doch tausend neu erstehen
Es braust das Fahnenlied voran dem braunen Heere
SA bereit, den Weg ihm nachzugehen.

Die Fahnen senkt vor Toten, die noch leben
Es schwört SA, die Hand zur Faust geballt
Einst kommt der Tag, da gibts Vergeltung, kein Vergeben
wenn Heil und Sieg durchs Vaterland erschallt.

Receive our salute; you died an honorable death!
Horst Wessel fell, but thousands newly arise
The anthem roars ahead of the brown army
The storm divisions are ready to follow his path.

The flags are lowered before the dead who still live
The storm division swears, with hand clenched in a fist,
That the day will come for revenge, no forgiveness,
When Heil and Sieg will ring through the fatherland.

== Melody ==
Following Wessel's death, he was officially credited with having composed the music as well as having written the lyrics for the "Horst Wessel Song". Between 1930 and 1933, however, German critics disputed this, pointing out that the melody had a long history. "How Great Thou Art" is a well-known hymn of Swedish origin with a similar tune, for example. Criticism of Horst Wessel as author became taboo after 1933, when the Nazi Party took control of Germany and criticism would likely be met with severe punishment.

The most likely immediate source for the melody was a song popular in the Imperial German Navy during World War I, which Wessel would no doubt have heard being sung by World War I veterans in the Berlin of the 1920s. The song was known either by its opening line as Vorbei, vorbei, sind all die schönen Stunden or as the "Königsberg-Lied", after the German cruiser Königsberg, which is mentioned in one version of the song's lyrics. The opening stanza of the song is

Vorbei, vorbei sind all die schönen Stunden
die wir verlebt am schönen Ostseestrand.
Wir hatten uns, ja uns so schön zusamm'n gefunden
es war für uns der allerschönste Ort.

Gone, gone are all the happy hours
that we spent on the beautiful Baltic shore.
Things were so beautiful between us all
and it was for us the finest place of all.

In 1936, the German music critic Alfred Weidemann published an article in which he identified the melody of a song composed in 1865 by Peter Cornelius as the "Urmelodie" (source melody). According to Weidemann, Cornelius described the tune as a "Viennese folk tune". This appeared to him to be the ultimate origin of the melody of the "Horst Wessel Song".

== Use outside Germany ==
During the 1930s and 1940s, the "Horst Wessel Song" was adapted by fascist groups in other European countries.

=== British Union of Fascists ===
One of the marching songs of the British Union of Fascists, known as The Marching Song or Comrades, the Voices was set to the same tune, and its lyrics were to some extent modelled on the song, though appealing to British fascism. Instead of referring to martyrs of the party, it identifies Britain's war dead as those marching in spirit against the "red front and massed ranks of reaction".

Comrades, the voices of the dead battalions,
Of those who fell, that Britain might be great,
𝄆 Join in our song, for they still march in spirit with us,
And urge us on to gain the fascist state!

We're of their blood and spirit of their spirit,
Sprung from that soil, for whose dear sake they bled,
𝄆 Against vested powers, Red Front, and massed ranks of reaction,
We lead the fight for freedom and for bread!

The streets are still, the final struggle's ended;
Flushed with the fight, we proudly hail the dawn!
𝄆 See, over all the streets, the fascist banners waving,
Triumphant standards of our race reborn!

=== Croatian Fascists ===
In modern Croatia, members of various far-right movements consider the adaptation written by Jan Zadravec, called "Hrvatski Stijeg" (The Croatian Banner), to be their unofficial anthem.

Vije se stijeg i legije predvodi.
Čuje se zvuk, zvuk naše pobjede.
𝄆 Junaci, koji za dom u boju sve su dali,
duhom su tu, koračaju uz nas!

Nek vidi se, nek cijeli svijet ga znade.
Nek čuje se, nek ori se za svagd.
𝄆 Kad brat uz brata opet svoje branit stade,
nek pamti se, da mi smo bili tu!

I sad ko tad, kad vrag nam opet prijeti;
I sad ko tad, budi se Hrvatska!
𝄆 I hrabro srce kada bije krv ne štedi,
jer za svoj rod i život vrijedi dat'! 𝄇

The flag flies high and guides the legions.
The sound is heard, the sound of our victory.
𝄆 Heroes, that gave everything fighting for our homeland,
are here in spirit, and march among us!

Let it be seen, may the whole world know it.
Let it be heard, may it echo for eternity.
𝄆 When brothers stood shoulder to shoulder to defend their own,
may it be remembered, that we were here!

So now as then, when the enemy threatens again;
So now as then, Croatia arises!
𝄆 When a brave heart fights, it doesn't save blood,
because for one's kin even dying is worth it!

=== Empire of Japan ===
いざ行け！ 旗押し立てて！
雄々しく進め、進め
我等の敵を破るところに、
希望(のぞみ)の道は拓く。
我等の敵を破るところに、
希望(のぞみ)の道は拓く。

Iza ike! Hata oshi tatete!
Ōshiku susume, susume
Warera no teki o yaburu tokoro ni,
Nozomi no michi wa hiraku.
Warera no teki o yaburu tokoro ni,
Nozomi no michi wa hiraku.

Let's go! Raise the flag!
Advance bravely, advance.
Wherever we defeat our enemies,
the path of hope will open up.
Wherever we defeat our enemies,
the path of hope will open up.

=== Falange fascist movement ===
In Spain, the Falange fascist movement sang Camisa azul to the same tune:

Camisa azul, el yugo y las flechas
vestía yo cuando aún dudabas tú.
Perseguido por izquierdas y por las derechas,
caía yo cuándo aún dudabas tú.

Despierta ya, burgués y socialista,
Falange trae: con la revolución,
la muerte del cacique y del bolchevique,
del holgazán y de la reacción.

Por el honor, la Patria y la justicia,
luchamos hoy en este amanecer.
Y si la muerte llega y nos acaricia,
¡Arriba España! Gritemos al caer.

La juventud está en nuestras filas,
y nuestro es también el porvenir.
España, te haremos Una, Grande y Libre,
aunque nosotros tengamos que morir.

Blue shirt, the yoke and arrows
I wore when you were still in doubt.
Chased by the left and the right,
I fell when you were still in doubt.

Wake up now, bourgeois and socialist,
Falange brings: with the revolution,
the death of the chieftain and the bolshevik,
of laziness and reaction.

For honor, Fatherland, and justice,
we fight today in this dawn.
And if death comes and caresses us,
Spain be raised! We shall say in falling.

The youth is in our ranks,
and ours is also the future.
Spain, we will make you One, Great and Free,
even if we have to die.

(Note that this was a traditional Falange march, not a march of the original Falange. It was sung by some of the volunteers of the 250th division, the División Azul, after the death of José Antonio Primo de Rivera.)

=== Legion of French Volunteers Against Bolshevism ===
In Vichy France the members of the Légion des volontaires français sang:

Nous châtierons les juifs et les marxistes,
Nous vengerons nos frères tués par eux,
Afin que l'idéal national-socialiste
Puisse être un jour fier et victorieux.

We shall smite the Jews and the Marxists,
We shall avenge our brothers killed by them,
So that the National Socialist ideal
Should one day be proud and victorious.

=== Golden Dawn ===
In modern Greece, Golden Dawn, an extreme right-wing party, uses the "Horst Wessel Song" with Greek lyrics in its gatherings or events such as the occasional public distribution of food "to Greeks only", while its leader, Nikolaos Michaloliakos, often uses the song's key stanzas (e.g. "The flags on high!") in his speeches.

The lyrics of their version are:

Από του Ολύμπου τη γρανιτένια όψη
μέχρι της Κύπρου τη σκλαβωμένη γη.
Απ' τη μεγάλη του ονείρου μας την Πόλη
ως τη Χειμάρρα, που είναι Ελληνική! (2x)

Ορθό το λάβαρο κι η νίκη μας προσμένει.
Ψηλά το μέτωπο και η καρδιά σκληρή.
Στον κόσμο αυτό εμείς θα δείξουμε πώς μένει
το θάρρος άπαρτο και φρούριο η τιμή! (2x)

Χτυπάτε αλύπητα, με λύσσα, με φοβέρα
με θάρρος, σύντροφοι, τα τείχη των εχθρών.
Με την Χρυσή Αυγή θα γίνουμε μια μέρα
εκατομμύρια στρατός αγωνιστών! (2x)

From the granite face of Olympus
to the enslaved land of Cyprus.
From the great City [Constantinople] of our dream
to Himara, which is Greek!

The flag on high, victory awaits us.
The head held high and our heart remains tough.
To this world, we will show how well we carry on,
our courage is indomitable and our honor is tough like a fortress!

Beat mercilessly, with awesome fury,
with courage, comrades, the walls of the enemies.
One day, together with the Golden Dawn, we will form
an army of millions of warriors!

=== All-Russian Fascist Organisation ===
The All-Russian Fascist Organization, founded in 1933, largely consisted of émigrés of the White Movement. It was led by Anastasy Vonsiatsky and was based in Connecticut, USA. The organisation dissolved after the United States entered World War II. Vonsyatsky was arrested for violating the 1917 Espionage Act.

The lyrics of their version are:

Заря близка, Знамёна выше, братья!
Смерть палачам свободы дорогой!
Звенящий меч фашистского врагам проклятья
Сметёт навеки их кровавый строй.

Соратники! Нас ждёт земля родная!
Все под знамёна! Родина зовёт…
Вонсяцкий-Вождь, измену, трусость презирая,
На подвиг нас, фашистов, поведёт.

Рубашки чёрные, готовьтесь к бою!
Железный фронт фашистов мы сомкнём
И на врага, вперёд, железною стеною
Бесстрашно, как один, мы все пойдём.

Победы день торжественный настанет,
Слетит колхоз и Сталин с ГПУ,
И свастика над Кремлём ярко засияет,
И чёрный строй пройдёт через Москву!

The dawn is close, Banners on high, brothers!
Death to the murderers of our dear liberty!
The fascists' sword is our enemy's damnation.
It will sweep away forever their bloody system.

Comrades, our Motherland awaits us!
Everyone under the banners, the Motherland is calling!
Vonsyatsky, our leader who scorns treason and cowardice,
With us, fascists, will lead the march!

Blackshirts, get ready for the battle!
The Iron Front of fascists unites us
And towards the enemy is an iron wall
Fearlessly, as one, we all go.

The victory day is coming gallantly,
Out with the Kolkhozes, Stalin and his GPU,
The hooked-cross over the Kremlin shall shine brightly
And our black ranks shall pass through Moscow!

=== Patriotic People's Movement ===
The fascist Lapua Movement and its successor Patriotic People's Movement of Finland sang a song to the tune of Horst Wessel Lied, translated by Otto Al’Antila:

Luo lippujen! Näin rinta rinnan kulkee
nyt mustapaidat tahtiin vakavaan.
Nyt, veljet rintamaan, mi valheen vuolteet sulkee
ja voittoon vie tai urhon kuolemaan!

Nyt tieltä pois, kun marssii joukko musta!
Se eestään kaataa kaikki estehet.
On katseet kirkkahat ja rinnas uskallusta,
ja toivoin katsoo meihin tuhannet.

Jo torvet soi nyt taistoon viime kerran,
oi kuulkaa uuden päivän pauhinaa!
Sa muista vannoneemme kautta Taivaan Herran:
Ei vaikertaa nyt Suomi enää saa!

Luo lippujen! Näin rinta rinnan kulkee
nyt mustapaidat tahtiin vakavaan.
Vain kurjat halveksia värejämme julkee,
kun synnyinmaamme riutuu tuskissaan.

Rally to the flags! So the blackshirts march
side by side, with a solemn step.
Now, brothers, to the front that closes the rivers of lies
and takes us to victory, or the hero to his death

Make way, as the black group marches!
It brings down all obstacles.
With bright gaze and chests full of daring
and thousands look up to us with hope.

The horns call us to the final battle,
O hear the roar of the new day!
Remember that we swore to the Lord:
No longer may Finland lament!

Rally to the flags! So the blackshirts march
side by side, with a solemn step.
Only the wretched scorn our colors
as our land of birth languishes in pain.

== Parodies ==
Before 1933, the German Communists and the Social Democrats sang parodies of the "Horst Wessel Song" during their street battles with the SA. Some versions simply changed the political character of the song:

Die Fahne hoch, die Reihen fest geschlossen
Rotfront marschiert mit eisenfestem Schritt
Genossen, die vom Stahlhelm Hakenkreuz erschossen
Marschier'n im Geist in uns'ren Reihen mit.

The flag high! The ranks tightly closed!
Red Front marches with iron-firm pace.
Comrades, shot dead by the Steel Helmet hooked-cross
March in spirit in our ranks.

Der Stahlhelm, or "The Steel Helmet", was a nationalist veterans' organisation closely aligned with the German National People's Party.

The Communist Party of Germany substituted completely new lyrics:

Ernst Thälmann ruft uns auf die Barrikaden!
Bauer, steh auf! Erheb dich, Arbeitsmann
Gewehre nehmt! Gewehre gut und scharf geladen!
Tragt rote Fahnen hoch im Kampf voran!

Ernst Thälmann calls us to the barricades
Farmer arise, workman lift yourself up
To arms! Load the guns well with live ammunition
Carry high red flags onward into the fight!

Ernst Thälmann was the KPD leader.

These versions were banned once the Nazis came to power and the Communist and Social Democratic parties prohibited. However, during the years of the Third Reich the song was parodied in underground versions, poking fun at the corruption of the Nazi elite. There are similarities between different texts as underground authors developed them with variations. Below are several versions.

Die Preise hoch, die Läden dicht geschlossen
Die Not marschiert und wir marschieren mit
Frick, Joseph Goebbels, Schirach, Himmler und Genossen
Die hungern auch doch nur im Geiste mit.

The prices high, the shops tightly closed
Poverty marches and we march with it
Frick, Joseph Goebbels, Schirach, Himmler and their comrades
They go hungry too, but only in spirit.

Wilhelm Frick was the Interior Minister, Baldur von Schirach was the Hitler Youth leader and Heinrich Himmler was head of the SS and police.

Another version was:

Die Preise hoch, die Schnauze fest geschlossen,
Hunger marschiert in ruhig festem Schritt.
Hitler und Göbbels, uns're beiden Volksgenossen,
Hungern im Geist mit uns Proleten mit.

Im Arbeitsamt wird SOS geblasen,
Zum Stempeln steh'n wir alle Mann bereit.
Statt Brot und Arbeit gibt der Führer uns nur Phrasen,
Und wer was sagt, lebt nur noch kurze Zeit.

Die Straße stinkt nach braunen Batallionen,
Ein Pöstchen winkt dem Sturmabteilungsmann.
Vielleicht verdient als Bonze morgen er Millionen,
Doch das geht uns 'nen braunen Scheißdreck an!

The prices high, the snouts firmly closed,
Hunger marches with a quiet, steady step.
Hitler and Göbbels, our two comrades,
Starve in spirit along with us proles.

In the unemployment benefits office SOS is sounded,
All we men stand prepared to register as unemployed.
Instead of bread and work, the Führer gives us just phrases,
And whoever says anything lives but a little while.

The street stinks of the brown battalions,
A cushy job winks at the Stormtrooper.
Perhaps tomorrow he'll be a fat cat and get millions,
But that means jack-shit to us.

In the first year of Nazi rule radical elements of the SA sang their own parody of the song, reflecting their disappointment that the socialist element of National Socialism had not been realised:

Die Preise hoch, Kartelle fest geschlossen
Das Kapital marschiert mit leisem Schritt.
Die Börsianer sind nun Parteigenossen
Und für das Kapital sorgt nun Herr Schmitt.

The prices high, the cartels are tightly closed
Capital marches with a quiet step.
The stockbrokers are now party comrades
And capital is now protected by Herr Schmitt.

Kurt Schmitt was Economics Minister between 1933 and 1935.

One of the best-known parodies was included in Bertolt Brecht's play Schweik in the Second World War (1943). Hanns Eisler composed a score for the "Kälbermarsch" (Calves' March):

Der Metzger ruft. Die Augen fest geschlossen
Das Kalb marschiert mit ruhig festem Tritt.
Die Kälber, deren Blut im Schlachthof schon geflossen
Sie ziehn im Geist in seinen Reihen mit.

The butcher calls! The eyes tightly closed
The calf marches with quiet, steady step.
Calves whose blood has already been spilt at the slaughterhouse
They march in spirit within its ranks.

The German post-punk and gothic rock band Xmal Deutschland released a version of the Kälbermarsch in 1981 on the compilation Lieber Zuviel Als Zuwenig (ZickZack Sommerhits 81) on the Hamburg label Zickzack Records.

After Nazi Germany's capitulation on 8 May 1945, which ended World War II in Europe, as well as Germany's occupation of Eastern Europe, Germany was divided into four occupation zones (British, French, US-American and Soviet). In the Soviet zone, a version of 'Die Preise hoch' became popular, targeting Communist functionaries:

Die Preise hoch die Läden fest geschlossen
Die Not marschiert mit ruhig-festem Schritt.
Es hungern nur die kleinen Volksgenossen,
Die Großen hungern nur im Geiste mit.

The prices high, the shops firmly closed
Poverty marches with a quiet, firm step.
Only the little folk are hungry
The bigwigs hunger only in spirit.

A French parody was written by humorist Pierre Dac, Chant des Waffen SS (Song of the Waffen SS). The lyrics are from the perspective of a French collaborator, singing about how proud he is to now serve Nazi Germany.

Waffen SS, enfants de la milice,
C'est nous les durs, les mecs au cœur de fer,
Et nous n'avons pour utiliser nos services,
Qu'un seul patron, un seul Adolf Hitler.

Waffen SS, children of the militia,
We are the tough guys, we guys with an iron heart,
And we do not have to use our services,
Only one boss, one Adolf Hitler.

The most notable English-language parody was written by Oliver Wallace to a similar melody and titled "Der Fuehrer's Face" for the 1942 Donald Duck cartoon of the same name. It was the first hit record for Spike Jones. The opening lyrics give the flavor of the song:

When der Fuehrer says we is de master race
We "Heil!" (pffft), "Heil!" (pffft) right in der Fuehrer's face
Not to love der Fuehrer is a great disgrace
So we "Heil!" (pffft), "Heil!" (pffft) right in der Fuehrer's face

Each "Heil!" is followed by a Bronx cheer.

== In popular culture ==
- In 2015, the New York Youth Symphony abruptly canceled a Carnegie Hall performance of Marsh u Nebuttya (Ukrainian: "March to Oblivion"), a 9-minute piece composed by Estonian-born Jonas Tarm, a 21-year-old junior at the New England Conservatory of Music, after it discovered that a piece it had commissioned included a 45-second musical quote of the "Horst Wessel Song". The composer would not explain his purpose in using the song in his piece, saying "[I]t can speak for itself", but the orchestra said that the usage was not appropriate.
- German composer Karlheinz Stockhausen's electronic and concrete work titled, Hymnen includes a sample recording of the "Horst Wessel Song". It premiered in Cologne, Germany, on 30 November 1967. It was also performed in New York's Philharmonic Hall (now David Geffen Hall) and London's English Bach Festival among other international performances.
- The tune is used in Lukas Foss' Elegy for Anne Frank (1989) as a contorted march about three-quarters of the way through the work. This leads to an abrupt silence after which the earlier theme returns.
- The neofolk band Death in June released a recording of the "Horst Wessel Song" under the name "Brown Book" on their 1987 album of the same name.
- The title theme for Wolfenstein 3D is a rendition of the "Horst-Wessel-Lied", recomposed by Bobby Prince and released for MS-DOS on 5 May 1992.
- In Return to Castle Wolfenstein, the song is played from radios in several locations in the game. The radios can be destroyed to stop the song playing.
- In 2003, a high school marching band from Paris, Texas, played the "Horst-Wessel-Lied" while waving a Nazi flag at a football match at Hillcrest High School in Dallas. The performance coincided with the Jewish holiday of Rosh Hashanah. The performance, which was meant to symbolize the history of World War II and also included musical selections and flags from Japan, France, the United Kingdom, and the United States, was greeted with boos from the audience which threw objects at the band. The school superintendent apologized to the Dallas school district and removed the flag from future performances of the composition.
- The song was featured in a scene of the 1993 TV miniseries JFK: Reckless Youth during which the future president was in a bar in Nazi Germany.
- The song was briefly featured in the 13th episode of Time Trax, originally aired on 5 May 1993, in which a Neo-Nazi group was singing modified English lyrics while a large SS insignia was set aflame.
- The song is used as background music in the third episode of season 4 of Industry as the political beliefs of a wealthy Austrian family become increasingly clear.
- In Episode 9 of Hellsing Ultimate The Major sings part of the song.

== See also ==
- "Giovinezza", hymn of the Italian National Fascist Party
- "Cara al Sol", anthem of the fascist Spanish Falange
- "Maréchal, nous voilà !", unofficial anthem of unoccupied Vichy France
- Music in Nazi Germany
- Nazi songs
- German laws against modern use of Nazi songs
- "Sturmlied"
- "Vorwärts! Vorwärts!", anthem of the Hitler Youth

== Bibliography ==
- Broszat, Martin (1987) [1984]. Hitler and the Collapse of Weimar Germany. Translated by Berghahn, V. R. Providence, Rhode Island: Berg Publishers. ISBN 0-85496-517-3.
- Burleigh, Michael (2012). The Third Reich: A New History. Pan Macmillan. ISBN 978-0330475501.
- Longerich, Peter (2015). Goebbels: A Biography. New York: Random House. ISBN 978-1400067510.
- Reuth, Ralf Georg (1993) [1990]. Goebbels. Translated by Winston, Krishna. New York: Harcourt, Brace. ISBN 0-15-136076-6.
- Siemens, Daniel (2013). The Making of a Nazi Hero: The Murder and Myth of Horst Wessel. I.B. Tauris. ISBN 978-0857733139.
- Snyder, Louis (1997). "Horst Wessel (1907–1930)". The Encyclopedia of the Third Reich – via Jewish Virtual Library.
- Wulf, Joseph (1989). Musik im Dritten Reich. Eine Dokumentation. Frankfurt: Ullstein. ISBN 3-550-07059-4.
