= Richard Fiedler (SS-Brigadeführer) =

SS and Police Leader and SS-Brigadeführer

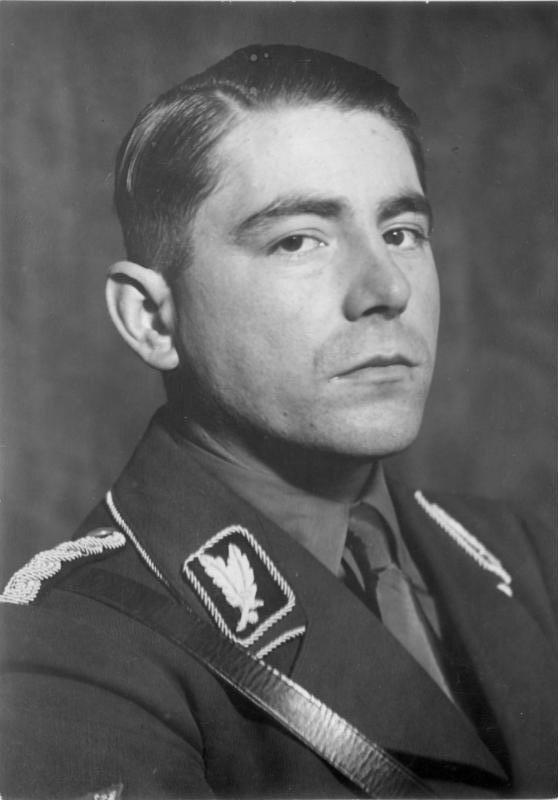
- Fiedler in 1935
- Born: 24 April 1908; Berlin, Kingdom of Prussia, German Empire
- Died: 14 December 1974 (age 66); Gräfelfing, Bavaria, West Germany
- Military career
- Allegiance: Nazi Germany
- Branch: Allgemeine SS; Waffen-SS
- Service years: 1939–1945
- Rank: SS-Brigadeführer and Generalmajor of Police; Hauptsturmführer of the Waffen-SS
- Commands: SS and Police Leader, "Montenegro"
- Conflicts: World War II
- Awards: Iron Cross, 2nd class War Merit Cross, 2nd class Wound Badge in black

Richard Kurt Fiedler (24 April 1908 – 14 December 1974) was a German Nazi Party politician, SA and SS Brigadeführer and Generalmajor of police. During the Second World War, he was involved in Holocaust-related repressions in areas annexed from Poland, and in Montenegro where he served as the SS and Police Leader (SSPF). After the end of the war, he was arrested by British authorities but managed to escape and live undetected under an assumed name for several years. In the 1960s, he twice was investigated by German law enforcement, first in connection with crimes committed in Poland, and secondly for a murder committed in Germany. These charges were dismissed for insufficient evidence and for the expiration of the statute of limitations, respectively.

== Early life ==
Fiedler, born to a working-class family from Berlin, received a vocational education and trained to become a locksmith. In 1924, he joined the Frontbann, a front organization of the Sturmabteilung (SA), which was outlawed at the time. After the ban on the SA was lifted, he joined it in October 1925. In April 1926, he also joined the Nazi Party (membership number 33,777). As an early Party member, he would later be awarded the Golden Party Badge. Between 1927 and 1929, he served as a propaganda leader and as a Zellenleiter (cell leader) for the Ortsgruppe (local group) in Berlin's Alexanderplatz section.

== Peacetime SA and political career ==
In 1929, Fiedler was commissioned an SA-Sturmführer and led Sturm 1 of SA-Standarte 4 in Berlin. After further promotions, he led its Sturmbann (battalion) I and, from September 1931 with the rank of SA-Standartenfuhrer, he was made commander of SA-Standarte 6, also in Berlin. Following the Nazi seizure of power, he was given command of SA-Untergruppe (subgroup) Berlin-Ost (eastern Berlin) in March 1933, reporting to the Berlin SA leader, SA-Gruppenführer Karl Ernst. Promoted to SA-Oberführer on 24 April 1933, Fiedler became commander of SA-Brigade 32, Berlin-Mitte (central Berlin), in September 1933. On the 20th of that month, Fiedler and Ernst were among eight or nine participants in the extrajudicial murder of Albrecht Höhler, a member of the Communist Party who had been sentenced to six years in prison in 1930 for the manslaughter of SA-Sturmfuhrer Horst Wessel. Höhler was taken from the prison and shot in a forest near Frankfurt am Oder.

The following year, during the Night of the Long Knives on 30 June, Fiedler avoided the fate of SA-Stabschef Ernst Röhm, Ernst and many other high-ranking SA leaders whose murders were ordered by Adolf Hitler. In February 1935, Fiedler was moved to Duisburg, where he served on the staff of SA-Gruppe Niederrhein and also became active in politics, becoming a city councillor. After being transferred again, in August 1936 he took over the leadership of SA-Brigade 38 of SA-Gruppe Mitte in Halle, remaining in command there through August 1939. He also obtained a seat as a city councillor in Halle from 1936 to 1939. From November 1933 until the fall of the Nazi regime, Fiedler also served as a deputy in the Reichstag from three different electoral constituencies: first #3 (Potsdam II) to March 1936, then #23 (Düsseldorf West) to April 1938 and, finally, #11 (Merseburg) to May 1945.

== SS career and the Second World War ==
On 1 August 1939, Fiedler switched from the SA to the Schutzstaffel (SS), receiving membership number 337,769. He was given command of SS-Abschnitt (district) XVII, based in Münster, overseeing three SS-Standarten. He remained in this post until 1 October 1940 when he was transferred to command of SS-Abschnitt XXXXIII, headquartered in Litzmannstadt (today, Łódź) in Reichsgau Wartheland, holding titular command there until 1 August 1944. There, he oversaw the three SS-Standarten 112, 113 and 114, based throughout the formerly Polish area in Litzmannstadt, Kalisch (today, Kalisz) and Leslau (today, Włocławek), respectively.

The Litzmannstadt ghetto was the second-largest of the Nazi ghettos in German-occupied Europe after the Warsaw Ghetto, and held over 160,000 detainees. While stationed in Litzmannstadt, Fiedler was aware of the genocide being perpetrated against the Jews of the area, and advocated methods of expanding it. In a report to his superiors of 20 September 1941, he advocated eliminating all the smaller ghettos in Wartheland and consolidating the Jews in a few centrally located ones. He stated the contribution the Jews made to the German war effort as forced laborers was exaggerated, that they were "dispensable" and that others could be found to do this work. He concluded that the goal of making the area Judenfrei as rapidly as possible by their expulsion and murder should be attained at all costs.

In 1940, Fiedler joined the Waffen-SS reserves as an officer, and served until October 1943 with one interruption between December 1941 and September 1942. He served at first with a military police unit and then was deployed for brief periods on the eastern front with the 5th SS Panzer Division Wiking.

On 1 October 1943, following the Italian armistice and the collapse of the Italian governorate of Montenegro, the area was occupied by German troops and Fiedler was appointed the SS and Police Leader (SSPF) for Montenegro. He would be the only holder of this post, and reported to the Higher SS and Police Leader (HSSPF) "Serbien", headquartered in Belgrade. In this post, Fiedler commanded all SS personnel and police in his jurisdiction, including the Ordnungspolizei (Orpo; regular uniformed police), the SD (intelligence service) and the SiPo (security police), which included the Gestapo (secret police). While in command here, his duties mainly involved combating partisans. There were very few Jews living in Montenegro during the war and the Italian authorities had been generally lax in enforcing racial laws, not deporting them or expropriating their property. However, under Fiedler's tenure as SSPF, the Nazi security forces identified most of the remaining Jews in Montenegro and transferred them to several extermination camps by February 1944, where 28 of the country's 30 Jews and many who had taken refuge there from other areas of Yugoslavia perished. After being wounded, Fiedler left his command on 20 October 1944, was hospitalized and returned to Germany. In the final phase of the war in February 1945, he commanded a defensive force in Strasburg (today, Brodnica) in Pomerania and in the operational area of Army Group Vistula.

== Post-war life ==
After the war, Fiedler was briefly taken prisoner by the British, but he managed to escape and go into hiding. He lived under the alias "Richard F. Giebeler" in Munich and worked as a merchant in the import and export business. His family found accommodation in Oberstaufen, and it was not until about 1951 that the family again reunited in Munich. At that time, he resumed using his real name and made a living as a salesman for a shirt company. The Munich Regional Court briefly investigated Fiedler in 1963 for his involvement in crimes against the Jews in Łódź, but dismissed the charges after three weeks on the basis that there was no concrete evidence of his direct involvement. Also, a preliminary investigation of Fiedler in connection with aiding and abetting the 1933 murder of Albrecht Höhler was dismissed in 1969 by the public prosecutor due to expiration of the statute of limitations. Fiedler died in Gräfelfing on 14 December 1974.

== SA, SS and police ranks ==
SA, SS and police ranks
| Date | Rank |
|---|---|
| 1929 | SA-Sturmführer |
| 1931 | SA-Sturmbannführer |
| September 1931 | SA-Standartenführer |
| April 1933 | SA-Oberführer |
| January 1937 | SA-Brigadeführer |
| August 1939 | SS-Brigadeführer |
| 1940 | Obersturmführer of reserves (Waffen-SS) |
| November 1943 | Hauptsturmführer of reserves (Waffen SS) |
| 1944 | Generalmajor of Police |

== Sources ==
- Information about Richard Fiedler (SS-Brigadeführer) in the Reichstag database
- Schiffer Publishing Ltd., ed. (2000). SS Officers List: SS-Standartenführer to SS-Oberstgruppenführer (As of 30 January 1942). Schiffer Military History Publishing. ISBN 0-7643-1061-5.
- Siemens, Daniel (2013). The Making of a Nazi Hero: The Murder and Myth of Horst Wessel. Bloomsbury Publishing. ISBN 978-0-857-72156-3.
- Yerger, Mark C. (1997). Allgemeine-SS: The Commands, Units and Leaders of the General SS. Schiffer Publishing Ltd. ISBN 0-7643-0145-4.
