= Fiddler's Green (disambiguation) =

Fiddler's Green is a place in legend.

Fiddler's Green may also refer to:

== Geography ==
- Fiddler's Green, Herefordshire, England
- Fiddler's Green, Norfolk, England
- Fiddler's Green Amphitheatre, Colorado, United States
- Firebase Fiddler's Green, in Helmand Province, Afghanistan
- A neighborhood in Cheltenham, Gloucestershire, England

== Music ==
- "Fiddler's Green", a song written in 1966 by English songwriter John Conolly. Famous versions include those by Tim Hart and Maddy Prior, The Dubliners, The Irish Rovers, Schooner Fare, and Bounding Main
- Fiddler's Green, an album by Tim O'Brien
- Fiddler's Green (band), a German band playing Irish independent speedfolk music
- "Fiddler's Green", a song by Canadian rock band The Tragically Hip from the album Road Apples
- "Fiddler on the Green", a heavy metal song by Demons and Wizards
- Fiddler's Green International Festival, an annual folk music festival in Rostrevor, Northern Ireland.

== Fiction ==
- A fictional character from Neil Gaiman's series The Sandman
- A building for privileged people in George A. Romero's 2005 film Land of the Dead, and
  - Land of the Dead: Road to Fiddler's Green, a 2005 video game
- A colony world in the 1982 Robert Heinlein novel Friday
- Fiddler's Green, a 1950 novel by Ernest K. Gann
