= Ann Maxwell =

American novelist (born 1944)

Ann Charters Maxwell
- Born: Ann Charters; April 5, 1944 (age 82); Milwaukee, Wisconsin, U.S.
- Education: University of California, Riverside (BA)
- Occupation: Novelist
- Writing career
- Pen name: A. E. Maxwell, Elizabeth Lowell, Lowell Charters, Annelise Sun
- Period: 1975–present
- Genres: science fiction, crime fiction, romance
- Notable work: Untamed
- Notable awards: RITA award – Historical Single Title Romance; 1994 Untamed
- Website: www.elizabethlowell.com

Ann Maxwell (born April 5, 1944), also known as A.E. Maxwell and Elizabeth Lowell, is an American writer. She has individually, and with co-author and husband Evan, written more than 50 novels and one non-fiction book. Her novels range from science fiction to historical fiction, and from romance to mystery to suspense.

== Biography ==
=== Early years ===
As a child, Maxwell read primarily classic literature. She did not read her first science fiction novel until college, and was not exposed to other genres, such as romance, until even later.

Maxwell earned a B.A. in English literature from the University of California, Riverside in 1966. Shortly thereafter, she married Evan Maxwell, a now former newspaper reporter who spent over fifteen years working for the LA Times, covering international crime. Early in their marriage, Maxwell became very bored. Her husband worked from 4:00 p.m. to midnight, and as there was no bus service near their house and Evan needed the car for work, Maxwell found herself alone at home with their toddler son. Maxwell did not like television and claims to have read all of the science fiction books in the local public library, in addition to everything science fiction in a local second-hand book store. After having exhausted all of her local Science Fiction options, she seated herself in front of her ancient manual typewriter and began to write a book she would enjoy, even though she had no training in creative writing.

When Maxwell finished her book, a science fiction novel, she submitted it to several publishers. Over nine months later she began to receive rejection letters for it. After finally finding an agent to represent her, she was able to sell her first book, Change

=== Career ===
Ann Maxwell has written over 50 novels, some individually and some in collaboration with her husband. Her novels have been published in 21 foreign languages, and there are over 23 million copies of her books in print.

==== Science fiction ====
Ann Maxwell began her writing career in the science fiction genre. Her first novel, Change, was published in 1975. Over the next decade, eight other science fiction novels followed. Seven of those novels were recommended for the Science Fiction Writers of America Nebula Award, with the first coming within one vote of being a Nebula Award finalist. Another, A Dead God Dancing, was nominated for what was then called TABA (The American Book Award).

==== Collaborations ====
Ann and her husband Evan, in conjunction with Ivar Ruud, a Norwegian polar bear hunter, published the non-fiction work The Year-Long Day in 1976. This book had been published in four countries and was condensed in Reader's Digest.

Several years later the couple began collaborating on a crime novel. This resulted in a series of books about a couple named Fiddler and Fiora, all published under the name A.E. Maxwell. The University of California gave one of the books, The Frog and the Scorpion, a creative writing award. Time magazine named Just Enough Light to Kill, one of the best crime novels of 1988.

The couple have also produced four best-selling suspense novels. Although these books are the result of a collaboration, they are published as Ann Maxwell, as the publisher wanted to use a woman's name.

Ann and Evan have also collaborated to write the novelization of the 1992 Val Kilmer movie Thunderheart. This novel is written under the pen name Lowell Charters, taking his middle name and her maiden name.

The couple have a structured system for their collaborations to minimize arguments. Evan Maxwell usually chooses the setting for the story. Together, the pair create the characters and then the plot. Once the plot has been fairly well established, Evan writes the first draft of the manuscript, consulting Ann if there are any major questions about the characters or plot changes that he would like to make. Ann then writes the second draft, with the freedom to make any changes that she thinks are necessary for "clarity, pacing, dialogue, and characterization."

==== Romance ====
The first dedicated word processor was introduced after Maxwell had already become established as a science fiction writer. She bought one immediately and soon found that she had tripled her productivity, as she was no longer forced to spend a great deal of time retyping her pages as she edited. This enabled her to get ahead of her contract, so Maxwell began to look for another type of writing that she would enjoy, but that would pay better.

Maxwell approached her agent for ideas. The agent suggested that she look into thrillers, romance novels and horror fiction, as all three were becoming very popular. After reading several horror novels, Maxwell realized that she would not enjoy writing that type of fiction. Her husband brought her five Silhouette novels, three of which were for a brand-new line, Sihouette Desire. Although Maxwell thought the novels were well written, she did not really enjoy the first four stories. The last one that she read, Corporate Affair by Stephanie James (a.k.a. Jayne Ann Krentz) made her fall in love with the genre. Because she had never read romance novels before, Maxwell picked up over fifty additional category romances to familiarize herself with the expected format and then set out to write her own romance. The resulting novel, Summer Thunder, published in 1982, was the debut of her romance career. This novel, and the more than thirty that have followed, are published under the pseudonym Elizabeth Lowell, a combination of Ann's middle name (Elizabeth) and Evan's middle name (Lowell), even though the books are written solely by Ann.

After several years writing category romances, Maxwell turned to historical romance. After she and her husband stopped writing their own mysteries, Maxwell found that she missed writing suspenseful plots and chose to take a slight turn into contemporary romantic suspense. She has no plans to return to the historical romance genre.

=== Family ===
Maxwell spends her free time hiking, fishing for salmon, cooking, gardening, or spending time on the family's boat. She and her husband live in the Pacific Northwest. They have a son, Matthew, and a daughter, Heather, who are now grown. Maxwell's daughter has published several books under the pseudonym Heather Lowell.

== Bibliography ==
=== As Ann Maxwell ===
==== Science fiction ====
- Timeshadow Rider (1986)
- Dancer's Illusion (1983)
- Dancer's Luck (1983)
- Fire Dancer (1982)
- The Jaws of Menx (1981)
- Name of a Shadow (1980)
- A Dead God Dancing (1979)
- The Singer Enigma (1976)
- Change (1975)

==== In collaboration with Evan Maxwell ====
- shadow and Silk (1997)
- The Ruby (1995)
- The Secret Sister (1993)
- The Diamond Tiger Written under Ann Maxwell (1992)

=== As A. E. Maxwell ===
==== Crime novels ====
- Murder Hurts (1993)
- The King of Nothing (1992)
- Money Burns (1991)
- The Art of Survival (1989)
- Just Enough Light to Kill (1988)
- Gatsby's Vineyard (1987)
- The Frog and the Scorpion (1986)
- Just Another Day in Paradise (1985)

==== Historical fiction ====
- The Golden Mountain (Written under "Annalise Sun" 1990)
- The Redwood Empire (Harlequin Historical #267; 1987)
- Golden Empire (1979)

=== As Elizabeth Lowell ===
==== Romantic suspense ====
- Night Diver (2014)
- Beautiful Sacrifice (Released 26 Dec 2012)
- Death Echo (HC Jun 8, 2010)
- Blue Smoke and Murder (HC Jun 2008; PB Mar 2009)
- Innocent as Sin (HC Jul 2007; PB May 2008)
- Whirlpool (Rewrite of The Ruby) (Nov 2006)
- The Wrong Hostage (HC Jun 2006; PB May 2007)
- The Secret Sister (Nov 2005)
- Always Time to Die (HC Jul 2005; PB Jun 2006)
- Death Is Forever (Rewrite of The Diamond Tiger; Dec 2004)
- The Color of Death (HC Jun 2004; PB Jun 2005)
- Die in Plain Sight (HC Jul 2003; PB Jun 2004)
- Running Scared (HC May 2002; PB Jun 2003)
- Moving Target (HC Jun 2001; PB May 2002)
- Midnight in Ruby Bayou (HC Jun 2000; PB May 2001)
- Pearl Cove (HC Jun 1999; PB Jun 2000)
- Jade Island (HC Sep 1998; PB Apr 1999)
- Amber Beach (HC Oct 1997; PB Oct 1998)
- Tell Me No Lies (PB 1986)

==== Contemporary romance ====
These Books Are Rewrites of Novels Previously Published under the Silhouette Intimate Moments Line

- This Time Love (2003)
- Eden Burning (2002)
- Beautiful Dreamer (2001)
- Remember Summer (1999)
- To the Ends of the Earth (1998)
- Where the Heart Is (1997)
- Desert Rain (1996)
- A Woman without Lies (1995)
- Lover in the Rough (1994)
- Forget Me Not (1994)

These books were in the Silhouette Desire Line

- 077 Summer Thunder (1983)
- 256 Chain Lightning (1988)
- 265 The Fire of Spring (1986)
- 319 Too Hot to Handle (1986)
- 355 Love Song for a Raven (1987)
- 415 Fever (1988)
- 462 Dark Fire (1988)
- 546 Fire and Rain (1990)
- 624 Outlaw (1991)
- 625 Granite Man (1991)
- 631 Warrior (1991)

==== Historical romance ====
- Winter Fire (1996)
- Autumn Lover (1996)
- Only Love (1995, reissued 2003)
- Enchanted (1994)
- Forbidden (1993)
- Untamed (1993)
- Only You (1992, reissued 2003)
- Only Mine (1992, reissued 2003)
- Only His (1991, reissued 2003)
- Reckless Love (1992)—Harlequin Historical

==== Non-fiction ====
- "Love Conquers All: The Warrior Hero and the Affirmation of Love" essay in Dangerous Men and Adventurous Women: Romance Writers on the Appeal of the Romance (1992, ISBN 0-8122-3192-9, 0-8122-1411-0)

== Awards ==
=== As Elizabeth Lowell ===
Awards for Elizabeth Lowell
Year	Nominated work	Category	Award	Result	Notes	Ref.
1994	Untamed	Historical Single Title Romance	Romance Writers of America RITA Award	Won		
1996	Autumn Lover	K.I.S.S. (Knight In Shining Silver) Hero	Romantic Times Reviewers' Choice Award	Won		

Maxwell's romance novels have consistently placed on The New York Times bestseller list. She has been awarded the Romantic Times Career Achievement Award in 1994 and 1999, and The Romance Writers of America awarded her a Lifetime Achievement Award in 1994.
