= Albrecht Höhler =

German communist and paramilitary (1898–1933)

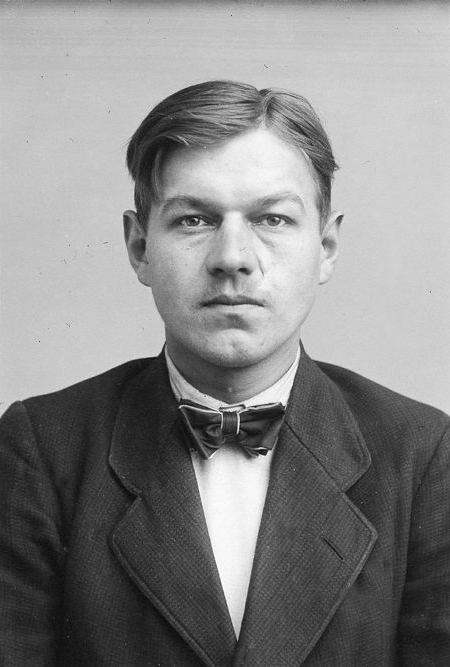
- Mugshot of Höhler in 1930
- Born: 30 April 1898; Mainz, Hesse-Nassau, Prussia, German Empire
- Died: 20 September 1933 (aged 35); Frankfurt an der Oder, Brandenburg, Nazi Germany
- Cause of death: Murder by gunshot
- Known for: Killing Horst Wessel, who later became a martyr for the Nazi cause
- Political party: Communist Party of Germany
- Spouse: Gertrud Margarete Hedwig Nickel (m. 1930)
- Conviction: Manslaughter
- Penalty: Six years and one month imprisonment

Albrecht "Ali" Höhler (30 April 1898 – 20 September 1933) was a German Communist. He was a member of the Red Front Fighters Association (Roter Frontkämpferbund or RFB), the street-fighters of the Communist Party of Germany. He is known for the murder of Horst Wessel, a local leader in Berlin of the Nazi Party's SA stormtroopers. After the Nazis came to power, Höhler was taken out of prison and executed by the SA. The triggerman was the Berlin SA leader Karl Ernst.

== Early life ==
Born in Mainz, Höhler was a carpenter and became a member of the Communist Party of Germany (KPD) in 1924. He was also a member of the Roter Frontkämpferbund and continued to be active in the RFB after its prohibition in 1929. By 1930, he was residing in the Mitte borough of Berlin. He was married to Margarete "Grete" Nickel.

== Killing of Horst Wessel ==
On 14 January 1930, the RFB was alerted about a rental dispute in Friedrichshain. Pub owner Elisabeth Salm was attempting to evict her tenant Horst Wessel from a subleased room, as Wessel refused to move out despite overdue rent payments and had now brought his girlfriend to continue living in the flat. Salm was not politically involved, but had ties to local Communists through her deceased husband and sought help at a bar in Scheunenviertel frequented by RFB members. According to information revealed in court, the notorious SA man was targeted for a "proletarian beating". This action was most likely politically motivated. Horst Wessel was called out as the "murderer of workers" in neighborhood posters put up by the Communist Party.

Wessel was involved in numerous violent actions against Communists in Berlin and was well known to Nazi Party Gauleiter (regional leader) Joseph Goebbels. Since it was known that Wessel had a firearm, Höhler took his gun in the RFB-led confrontation with Wessel. Höhler later stated in court that he shot Wessel as he reached for his pocket. However other testimonies from the trial revealed that Wessel was actually unarmed during the confrontation; his pistol was inside a wardrobe, from which the accomplices stole it immediately after the shooting.

The seriously injured Wessel died of sepsis on 23 February 1930, as a result of the gunshot wound.

== Imprisonment and assassination ==
Höhler first fled to Prague, but then returned to Berlin, where he was arrested. On 26 September 1930, Höhler was convicted of manslaughter and sentenced to six years and one month imprisonment at Wohlau Prison in Lower Silesia. Höhler's accomplices were sentenced to terms ranging from four months to six years for aiding in manslaughter. Elisabeth Salm, who was defended by Hilde Benjamin, was charged with aiding and abetting as well, and was ultimately sentenced to 18 months imprisonment.

On 11 August 1933, Höhler was transferred to Berlin by the new Nazi administration for interrogation at the Reich Security Main Office (RSHA) on Prinz-Albrecht-Straße. On 20 September 1933, the RSHA stated that Höhler had been sent back to Lower Silesia, allegedly to be returned to prison. In reality, the transport had been rerouted under orders of SA-Gruppenführer Karl Ernst. Besides the three prison officers in charge of the transfer, also involved were two SS officers, Gestapo chief Rudolf Diels and Richard Fiedler, and three SA men, Prince August Wilhelm of Prussia, Walter von Mohrenschildt, Willi Schmidt, and Willi Markus. He was transferred from the police prison at Alexanderplatz on the basis of a Gestapo signed delivery order. Near Potsdamer Platz, several more vehicles approached the prisoner van. The vehicle column drove towards Frankfurt an der Oder.

About 12 km from Frankfurt, the column stopped on the Berlin-Frankfurt Chaussee, Höhler was ordered to leave the transport and was led by a group of at least eight people away from the road to a nearby forest. There, Gruppenführer Ernst gave a short speech, in which he condemned Höhler to death as the murderer of Horst Wessel. Höhler was then shot by several of those present. The body was buried on the spot in a shallow grave; the remains were found in August 1934.

== Later investigation ==
In 1933, the investigation into Höhler's murder was aborted due to political pressure. The official police report to the prosecutor allegedly stated that the transport had been intercepted on the street by a group of seven to eight SA men, that the officers had surrendered Höhler under threat of violence, and Höhler had been taken away to an unknown destination.

When the investigation was reopened by the Berlin prosecutor's office in the 1960s, the true course of events was discovered by interrogating Willi Schmidt and Kurt Wendt, Karl Ernst's chauffeur. At that time, Höhler's murderers were identified as Prince August Wilhelm of Prussia, Diels (who concealed the facts in his memoirs), Ernst, Ernst's adjutant Walter von Mohrenschildt, Fiedler, Markus, the detectives Maikowski and Walter Pohlenz and possibly Gerd Voss, the legal adviser of the SA group in Berlin-Brandenburg.

The fatal shots were likely fired by Ernst and von Mohrenschildt, according to the findings of the prosecutor. Ernst was said to have organized the murder on the orders of Ernst Röhm, who had received orders from Adolf Hitler that the killer of Wessel be summarily shot.

Less than a year after Höhler's murder, Ernst, von Mohrenschildt, Voss, and Röhm were all summarily shot during the Night of the Long Knives. Prince Wilhelm was interned by the U.S. Army after the war. He was sentenced to two years in prison by a denazification court in 1948, and died in 1949. Diels was interned by the Allies until 1948, and died after his rifle accidentally discharged while he was hunting in 1957.

The investigation of the surviving perpetrators – Schmidt, Pohlenz, Markus, and Fiedler – was discontinued in 1969, as the prosecutors could only prove aiding and abetting the murder, for which the statute of limitations had already passed.
