= Blutendes Deutschland =

1932 film

- Directed by: Johannes Häussler
- Produced by: Johannes Häussler
- Starring: Adolf Hitler
- Music by: Hans Bullerian
- Production company: Deutscher Film-Vertrieb
- Distributed by: Terra-Filmverleih
- Release dates: 15 December 1932 (version 1); 30 March 1933 (version 2)
- Running time: 12 minutes
- Countries: Weimar Republic (version 1); Nazi Germany (version 2)
- Language: German

Bleeding Germany (German: Blutendes Deutschland) is a 1933 German propaganda documentary film by Johannes Häussler. Two versions were made, a shorter edit in December 1932 and a second cut released shortly after the Nazi seizure of power in late March 1933. Presented in montage form, sources include old photographs, documents and newsreels.

A second section, entitled "Germany Awakens" traced the history of the Nazi party up to the March 1933 German federal election. The film traces Germany's history from the Franco-Prussian War, the founding of the German Empire, the First World War, the occupation of the Ruhr, the martyrdoms of Albert Leo Schlageter, Horst Wessel and others, the rise of Hitler, the foundation of the Harzburg Front and their eventual victory.
