= Evan Maxwell =

American novelist

Evan Maxwell began his writing career as a journalist. After several years as international crime reporter for the Los Angeles Times, he retired except for occasional freelancing, in order to focus on his work as a novelist. He has written two novels; All the Winters That Have Been (1995) and Season of the Swan (1998).

The vast majority of Maxwell's published novels have been co-authored with his wife; he is the husband of bestselling author Elizabeth Lowell (real name Ann Maxwell), with whom he has collaborated on nine mystery novels and a non-fiction book entitled The Year Long Day, using the pen name A.E. Maxwell, representing both their first names as initials. In addition, they have co-authored four earlier suspense novels which were published under the single name Ann Maxwell, because the publisher preferred to use a woman's name for marketing reasons.
