= Fabrangen Fiddlers =

- Origin: Washington, DC
- Genres: klezmer, Jewish
- Years active: 1971–present
- Members: David Shneyer; Alan Oresky; Frank Sparber; Theo Stone; Larry Robinson
- Past members: Sue Roemer

The Fabrangen Fiddlers are an American Jewish folk music band. Founded in 1971, the Washington, DC-area group was the first music collective devoted to the rediscovery of Jewish folk music and the development of new Jewish liturgical folk music.

== Origin ==
The Fabrangen Fiddlers formed in 1971 as part of the Fabrangen Jewish Free Culture Center in Washington, DC, which later evolved into the Fabrangen Havurah, one of the original havurahs to form in the United States, as cited in The Jewish Catalog. The movement formed in the late 1960s and early 1970s as an alternative to traditional Jewish synagogues and temples. The desire was to discover a more authentic Jewish experience. The early havurah movement was characterized by experimentation and reforging of ritual.

It was in this environment in 1971 that David Shneyer, Alan Oresky and Frank Sparber formed a trio that was to become the Fabrangen Fiddlers. The group started by creating original liturgical music for traditional Hebrew prayers for the Fabrangen community in Washington, DC. Rabbi Arthur Waskow has written extensively about the formation of the Fabrangen community.

The initial line-up of the group featured David Shneyer on vocals, guitar, and harmonica; Alan Oresky on violin and mandolin; and Frank Sparber on clarinet. Sue Roemer joined the group in 1973 and was featured on vocals, piano and guitar. In 1975, Theo Stone joined and was featured on stand-up bass, electric bass guitar, and sitar. Larry Robinson joined in 1978 and was featured on banjo, guitar and bousouki.

== Soul Joy Album ==
In 1972, Shneyer, Oresky, and Sparber released the first Fabrangen Fiddlers album, Simchat Hanefesh Soul Joy. This album has been archived by Dartmouth University as part of the Dartmouth Jewish Sound Archive. The archive includes the full recording of the album as well as a copy of the album cover. The album featured original music composed by David Shneyer which was set to traditional Jewish liturgical text. The album's liner notes state that "the songs and arrangements on this record were created, like the Shabbas meals, like the silk-screened posters, dashikis with tzitzit, and other Fabrangen arts and crafts because Jewish communal spirit gives meaning....It is a new song we are singing."

By 1973 the Fabrangen Fiddlers had become independent from the Fabrangen Havurah.

== American Chai! Album ==
Their second album American Chai! (1976 ) blended American, Jewish liturgical, and klezmer music. In a 1979 review in Jewish Living Magazine, music critic Nat Hentoff wrote that the Fiddlers "create an astonishing blend. Their lyrics are in Hebrew and Yiddish, and the spirited backgrounds include elements of bluegrass -- a 'purer' country idiom than the Nashville sound -- jazz, hillbilly, blues, and, of course, the swirling 'cry' of Yiddish swing."

The album featured psalms; Hasidic tunes; even a poem by the Indian writer Rabindranath Tagore translated into Yiddish, and a hasidic "raga" in which Theo Stone plays sitar. Hentoff wrote, "much of the music is deeply lyrical, and all of it is performed with such joy and respect that American Chai! is both a pleasure in itself and also, I believe, a historic document, for this is not mere ecumenicism. The music here, is unmistakably, freshly Jewish and opens new avenues in the art of listening."

In a 1985 interview with the Baltimore Jewish Times, the Fabrangen Fiddlers explained that throughout history, Jews have always borrowed from the surrounding culture while retaining their own ethnic identity. Wherever Jews were in the diaspora, they picked up musical styles: Spanish, Russian, Eastern European, North African Arabic. It was a natural transition for American klezmer performers to experiment with American music styles for Jewish liturgical and celebratory music.

In The New Jewish Yellow Pages, Mae Shafter Rockland wrote that the Fabrangen Fiddlers, vaguely annoyed with the extent to which Israeli music dominated Jewish music in America, felt the time was ripe for a flowering of a hyphenated Jewish-American culture. Rockland quotes musicologist Ruth Rubin as saying that the Fabrangen Fiddlers "…are the best there is… [violinist] Alan [Oresky] is absolutely remarkable, the fiddle is part of his arm."

=== Sue Roemer ===
Folk singer/cantor Sue Roemer was a member of the Fabrangen Fiddlers from 1973 until her death in 2010. Roemer brought a repertoire to the group that included Yiddish, labor and egalitarian liturgical Jewish music.
