= Horst Wessel =

German Nazi martyr (1907–1930)

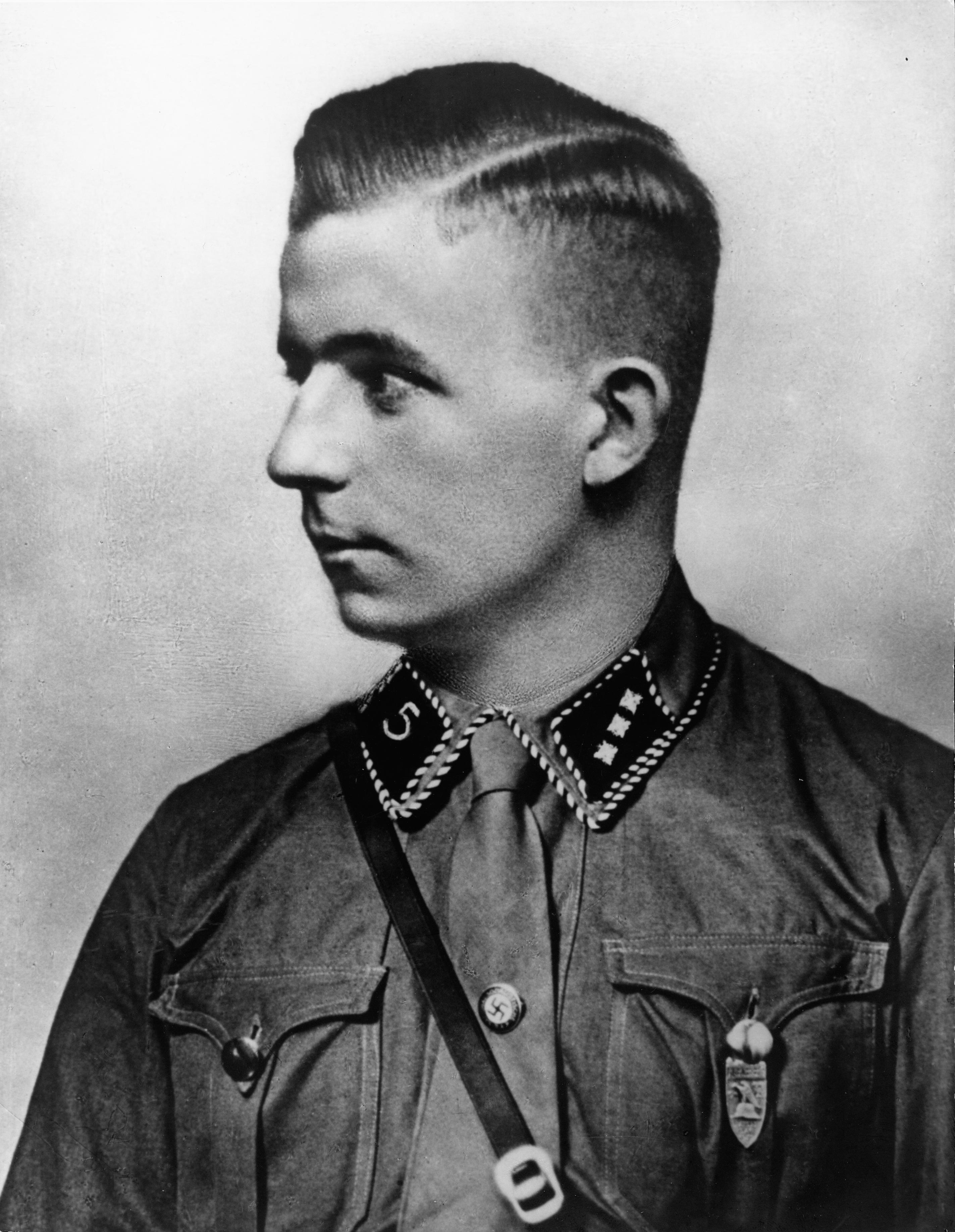
- Wessel in 1929
- Born: Horst Ludwig Georg Erich Wessel; 9 October 1907; Bielefeld, German Empire
- Died: 23 February 1930 (aged 22); Berlin, Weimar Republic
- Cause of death: Blood poisoning contracted during treatment for a gunshot wound
- Occupation: SA-Sturmführer
- Organization: Sturmabteilung (SA)
- Political party: Nazi Party (1926–30)

Horst Ludwig Georg Erich Wessel (9 October 1907 – 23 February 1930) was a member of the Sturmabteilung (SA), the paramilitary wing of the Nazi Party, who became a propaganda symbol in Nazi Germany following his murder in 1930 by two members of the Communist Party of Germany (KPD). After his death, Nazi Propaganda Minister Joseph Goebbels elevated him into a martyr for the Nazi Party.

Wessel first joined a number of youth groups and extreme right-wing paramilitary groups, but later resigned from them and joined the SA, the original paramilitary wing of the Nazi Party. He rose to command several SA squads and districts. On 14 January 1930, he was shot in the head by two Communists after pub owner Elisabeth Salm attempted to evict Wessel from a subleased room as Wessel refused to move out despite overdue rent payments. Albrecht "Ali" Höhler was arrested and charged with his murder. Höhler was initially sentenced to six years in prison but was forcibly removed from jail and killed by the SA in September 1933, nine months after the Nazis came to power.

Wessel's funeral was given wide attention in Berlin, with many of the Nazi elite in attendance. After his death, he became a propaganda symbol in Nazi Germany. A march for which he had written the lyrics was renamed the "Horst-Wessel-Lied" ("Horst Wessel Song"), and became the official anthem of the Nazi Party. After Adolf Hitler came to national power in 1933, the song became the co-national anthem of Germany, along with the first verse of the previous "Deutschlandlied", or "Deutschland Deutschland über alles"; nowadays the third verse "Einigkeit und Recht und Freiheit" is used.

== Early life ==
Wessel with his parents, 1907

Horst Ludwig Georg Erich Wessel was born on 9 October 1907 in Bielefeld, Westphalia, the son of Wilhelm Ludwig Georg Wessel (born 15 July 1879), a Lutheran minister in Bielefeld, and later in Mülheim an der Ruhr, then at the Nikolai Church, one of Berlin's oldest churches. Wessel's mother, Bertha Luise Margarete Wessel (née Richter), also came from a family of Lutheran pastors. Wessel's parents were married on 1 May 1906. He grew up alongside his sister Ingeborg Paula Margarethe, born 19 May 1909, and his brother Werner Georg Erich Ludwig, born 22 August 1910. When they moved from Mülheim to Berlin, the family lived in the Jüdenstraße.

Wessel attended four different schools in Berlin: firstly the Köllnische Gymnasium from 1914 to 1922, then briefly the Königstädtisches Gymnasium and the Evangelisches Gymnasium zum Grauen Kloster ("Protestant Grey Cloister Gymnasium"). For his final two years of schooling, he attended the Luisenstädtisches Gymnasium, where he passed his Abitur examination and which would later be renamed in his memory. On 19 April 1926, Wessel enrolled in Friedrich Wilhelm University to study law.

The Wessel family, influenced by the politics of the father, avidly supported the monarchist German National People's Party (DNVP). In 1922, aged 15, Wessel joined the DNVP's youth group Bismarckjugend ("Bismarck Youth"), from which he resigned in 1925. At the time, the DNVP was the most influential right-wing party.

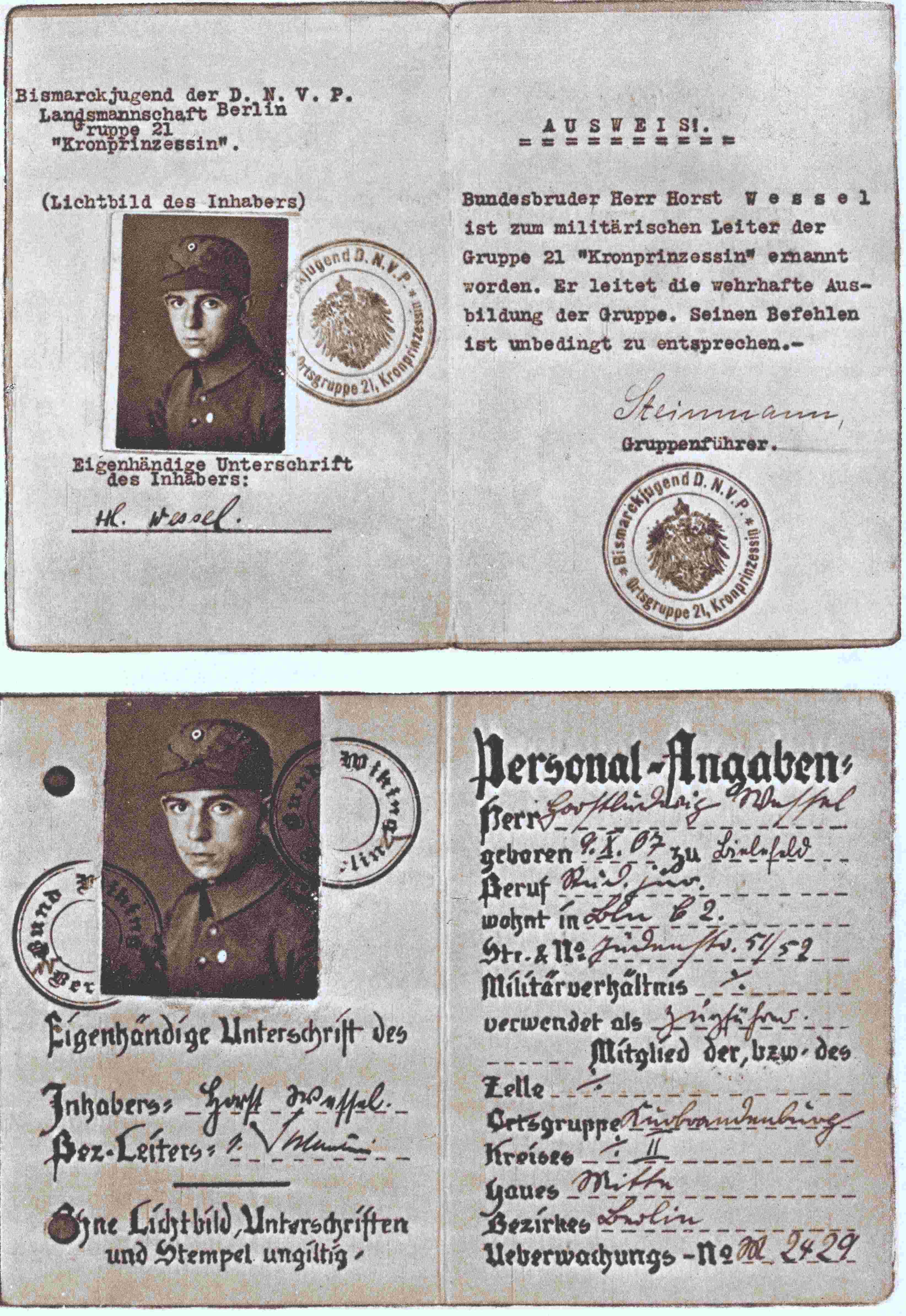
Membership cards of Horst Wessel in Bismarckjugend and Bund Wiking.

Wessel soon began to frequent bars and hang out in flophouses. He founded his own youth group, the Knappschaft, the purpose of which was to "raise our boys to be real German men". Near the end of 1923, he joined the Viking League (Bund Wiking), a paramilitary group founded by Hermann Ehrhardt – the stated goal of which was to effect "the revival of Germany on a national and ethnic basis through the spiritual education of its members". Wessel described the Viking League as having "the ultimate aim" of the "establishment of a national dictatorship". He soon became a local leader, engaging in street battles with youth members of their adversarial groups, such as the Social Democratic Party (SPD) and the Communist Party (KPD). Later, Wessel joined groups with a more sinister reputation, including the "Olympia German Association for Physical Training", a powerful paramilitary group which was the successor of the disbanded Reinhard Regiment.

On 22 December 1929, Wessel's brother Werner and three other members of the Sturmabteilung and Nazi Party froze to death on a skiing trip.

== Nazi Party member ==
=== Joining the SA ===
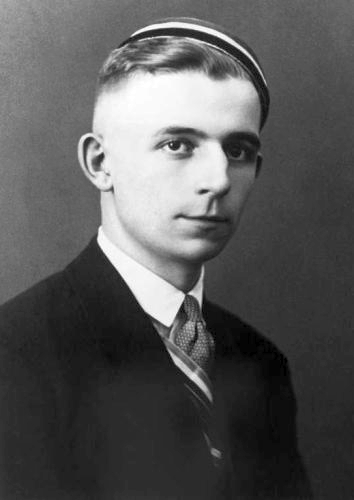
Wessel as a member of the Corps Normannia Berlin (before 1929)

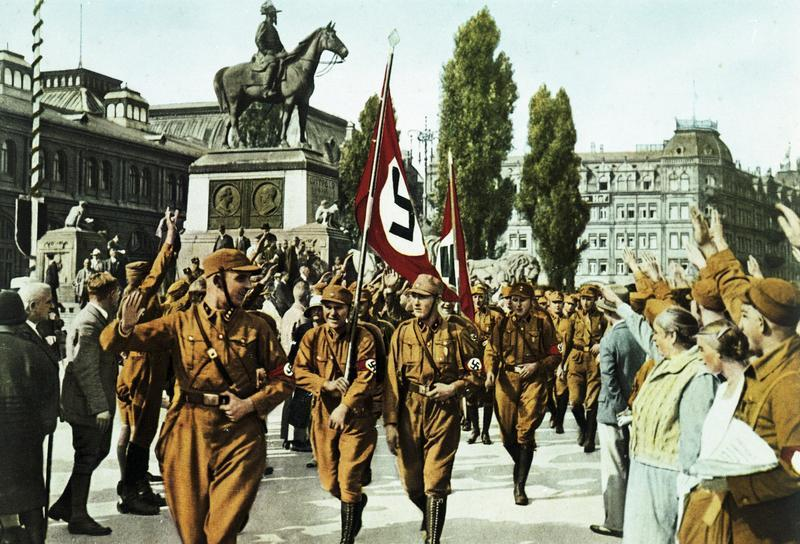
Wessel in his Sturmführer uniform leading an SA unit at a Nazi Party rally in Nuremberg, 1929

In May 1926, the Viking League and the Olympia Association were banned in Prussia, when it was discovered they were planning a coup against the government. Realizing the League would not achieve its self-defined mission and was moving in the direction of tolerating the parliamentary political system, Wessel resigned from it on 23 November 1926, at age 19. On 7 December, he joined the paramilitary Sturmabteilung ("Storm Detachment" or SA) of Adolf Hitler's National Socialist German Workers' Party (NSDAP or Nazi Party). He later commented that over two-thirds of his colleagues from the Viking League had already joined the SA and the Nazi Party. (Note: In 1928, the Viking League gave up its effort to exist underground as a banned organization and merged itself into the SA.)

Part of the attraction of the NSDAP to Wessel was Joseph Goebbels, the Party's newly appointed Gauleiter (regional leader) of Berlin, about whom he would later say:

There was nothing [Goebbels] couldn't handle. The party comrades clung to him with great devotion. The SA would have let itself be cut to pieces for him. Goebbels – he was like Hitler himself. Goebbels – he was 'our' Goebbels.

Writing in his diaries – he kept two, one for his political life and one for other matters – Wessel described the differences between the groups he had been a part of, and the appeal of being involved in the Nazi Party:

Bismarck League, that was pleasure and enjoyment, the Viking League was adventure, the atmosphere of the coup, playing at soldiers, albeit against a background that was not without its dangers. But the NSDAP was a political awakening. ... The movement's centrifugal force was tremendous. ... One meeting followed hard on the heels of the last one. ... Street demonstrations, recruiting drives in the press, propaganda trips into the provinces creating an atmosphere of activism and high political tension that could only help the movement.

It was Goebbels who had created this atmosphere, which prompted right-wing youth to leave organizations they felt had let them down for the excitement of the Nazi Party's highly visible activism.

For a few years Wessel lived a double life, as a middle-class university law student and as a member of the primarily working-class SA, but in some ways the two worlds were converging in ideology. At university, Wessel joined a dueling society dedicated to "steeling and testing physical and moral fitness" through personal combat. With the SA, which was always interested in a good street fight, he was immersed in the antisemitic attitudes typical of the extreme right-wing paramilitary culture of the time.

His study of jurisprudence at school was seen through the filter of his belief that the application of the law was primarily an instrument of power; and his personal beliefs, already geared toward anti-Jewish attitudes, were further hardened by the novel From Double Eagle to Red Flag by White emigre General Pyotr Krasnov, which is set between the Russian Revolution of 1905 and the Red Guards' victory at the end of the Russian Civil War, and which was first published in the Weimar Republic in 1922. According to Wessel's sister, General Krasnov's novel was enormously influential upon her brother.

=== Activities ===
In August 1927, Wessel traveled in a group of fifty SA men to the Nazi Party rally in Nuremberg, which he described as "Flags, enthusiasm, Hitler, all of Nuremberg a brown army camp. It made an enormous impression." Wessel was with other Berlin-based Nazis making up a group of 400, led by Goebbels. At that time the SA was banned in Berlin. When they returned, they were arrested.

Wessel soon impressed Goebbels. In January 1928, a period in which the Berlin city authorities had banned the SA in an effort to curb political street violence, Wessel was sent to Vienna to study the National Socialist Youth Group, and the organizational and tactical methods of the Nazi Party there. In July 1928, he returned to Berlin to recruit local youths, and was involved in helping to implement a reorganization of the NSDAP in Berlin into a cell-structure, similar to that used by the German Communist Party (KPD). Wessel did this despite SA rules forbidding its members from working for the Party.

In 1929, Wessel became the Street Cell Leader of the Alexanderplatz Storm Section of the SA. In May, he was appointed district leader of the SA for Friedrichshain where he lived, SA-Sturm 5. with the rank of Sturmführer. In October 1929, Wessel dropped out of university to devote himself full-time to the Nazi movement. In that same year, he wrote the lyrics to "Die Fahne hoch!" ("Raise the Flag!"), which would later be known as the "Horst Wessel Song".

Wessel wrote songs for the SA in conscious imitation of the Communist paramilitary, the Red Front Fighters' League – in fact, the music to "Die Fahne hoch!" was taken from a Communist song book – to provoke them into attacking his troops, and to keep up the spirits of his men. He was recognized by Goebbels and the Berlin Nazi hierarchy as an effective street speaker; in the first 11 months of 1929, for instance, he spoke at 56 NSDAP events.

Wessel's Friedrichshain Sturm 5 unit had a reputation as being "a band of thugs, a brutal squad". One of his men described the way they fought against the Communists (KPD):

Horst made Adolf Hitler's principle his own: terror can be destroyed only by counterterror ... The places where the KPD met were often visited by a mere handful of loyal supporters, and our standpoint was made unequivocally clear to the landlord and all who were present. In the East End [of Berlin] Horst Wessel opened up a route through which a brown storm tide poured in unceasingly and conquered the area inch by inch.

By 1929–30, the continual violence in Berlin between the street fighters of the Nazi Party and other extreme right-wing groups, and those of the Communist Party and other parties on the left, had become a virtual civil war the Prussian police were powerless to control. This physical violence was encouraged by Goebbels, the Nazi Gauleiter of Berlin, to whom Hitler had given the difficult task of establishing a reorganized Nazi presence in "Red Berlin" – a city sympathetic to the Communists and the Socialists – one that was under the firm control of the Nazi Party headquarters in Munich and which was not controlled by the northern branch of the party under the Strasser brothers with their socialist leanings. Goebbels' violent approach was appreciated by Wessel, who preferred it to the official restraint he experienced as a member of the Bismarck Youth and the Viking League.

Wessel kept two journals, one specifically about his political life. In neither does he describe his physical participation in these street skirmishes: he refers to "we" – i.e. the SA – and not to "I". Wessel had broken one arm several times while horseback riding as a schoolboy which deformed it, and had been given a permanent exemption from physical education. Nonetheless, he boxed and practiced martial arts while in the Viking League, and boasted in one journal of having mastered ju-jitsu, a primarily defensive art he may have needed to compensate for his lack of physical power. Still, the limitations of his physicality would have prevented him from taking as full a role in the street brawls, and he may therefore have ratcheted up his rhetoric in an attempt to compensate for his physical disability.

Wessel became well known among the Communists when – on orders from Goebbels – he led a number of SA incursions into the Fischerkiez, an extremely poor Berlin district where Communists mingled with underworld figures. Several of these agitations were only minor altercations, but one took place outside the tavern which the local Communist Party (KPD) used as its headquarters. As a result of that melée, five Communists were injured, four of them seriously.

The Communist newspaper accused the police of letting the Nazis get away, but arresting the injured Communists. The Nazi newspaper claimed that Wessel had been trying to give a speech when shadowy figures emerged and started the fight. Wessel was marked for death by the KPD, with his face and address featured on street posters. The slogan of the KPD and the Red Front Fighters' League became "Strike the fascists wherever you find them".

=== Erna Jänicke ===
In September 1929, Wessel met Erna Jänicke, a 23-year-old ex-prostitute, in a tavern not far from Alexanderplatz. Later sources claim Wessel earned money as Jänicke's procurer, however this has never been substantiated. On 1 November, she moved into his room on the third floor of 62 Große Frankfurter Straße, today Karl-Marx-Allee, which Wessel sublet from 29-year-old Elisabeth Salm, whose late husband had been an active Communist Red Front Fighter, although she described herself as apolitical.

After a few months, there was a dispute between Salm and Wessel over unpaid rent in which Salm claimed that Wessel had threatened her. The landlady may have feared that she could lose her legal rights to the apartment, which she rented and did not own, if Jänicke, who she assumed was a working prostitute, was found to be living there. She had already been in danger of losing her legal claim when she moved out of Berlin to live, and then had to move back because she found out that living in Berlin was a legal requirement.

The landlady asked Jänicke to leave but she refused. Salm stated that after having a “quiet word” with Wessel, she agreed to have the couple move out by 1 February, but then changed her mind and wanted the two tenants out immediately. A few hours later on the evening of 14 January 1930, Salm appealed to Communist friends of her late husband for help. At first, the Communists were not interested in helping Salm, as she was not well-liked by them because she had given her husband a church funeral instead of allowing the KPD to give him the standard burial rite used for members of the Red Front Fighters' League.

When they realized that Horst Wessel was involved in the dispute, they agreed to beat him up and get him out of Salm's flat by force. Knowing they needed muscle, they sent word to a nearby tavern for Albrecht "Ali" Höhler, an armed pimp, perjurer and petty criminal. Höhler, a heavily tattooed cabinetmaker who had recently been released from prison, was a Communist and a member of the Red Front Fighters' League.

== Death ==
Mug shots of Albrecht Höhler, the man arrested and later killed for Wessel's murder, wearing the new suit given to him by the Communist Party

At around 10 p.m. on 14 January 1930, Höhler and Erwin Rückert, another member of the KPD, knocked at the door of the room where Wessel and Jänicke lived, while the remainder of the gang of at least a dozen men waited on the street outside. When Wessel, who was expecting a visit from the leader of another SA Sturm group, opened the door, he was almost immediately shot in the jaw at point-blank range.

Although it was later claimed that Wessel had attempted to draw a gun and so had been shot in self-defense, this was denied by eyewitnesses, who said that he had been given no time to react. The attackers searched the room, removed a pistol from the wardrobe and a rubber truncheon, and fled the scene, returning to the rest of the men in the street. The entire group then returned to their usual nighttime activities.

Even as Wessel was lying seriously wounded in hospital, Goebbels was already releasing reports asserting that those who had carried out the attack were "degenerate communist subhumans". Wessel received medical attention and recovered somewhat, but eventually died on 23 February from sepsis contracted in hospital.

Following his death, the National Socialists and the Communists offered different accounts of the events. The police, led by Chief Inspector Teichmann, and several courts determined that both political and private reasons had led to Wessel's assassination. By 17 January 1930, the police had announced that Höhler, whom Jänicke had identified as the gunman, was their prime suspect.

It was then reported by a non-Nazi and non-Communist newspaper that Jänicke had known Höhler prior to the murder, because Wessel had used her to spy on those of her former clients who were Communists. The Communists claimed that Höhler had been Jänicke's pimp until Wessel stole her from him, and that this was the motive behind the shooting. Jänicke denied these stories, saying that she had never been a spy for Wessel, and that she knew Höhler only as an "acquaintance from the streets".

The police and courts believed her, and Höhler was quickly arrested. After a trial, he was sentenced to six years' imprisonment for the shooting. The light sentence was the result of the court's finding of extenuating circumstances. Seven accomplices were found guilty and sentenced to jail.

=== Executions ===
Three years later, after the Nazis ascended to national power in 1933, Höhler was taken out of prison under false pretenses by then Gestapo chief Rudolf Diels and members of the SA, and illegally executed.

On 10 April 1935, five years after Wessel's assassination, and two years after the SA murder of Höhler, two people accused of being involved in Wessel's killing were put on trial and subsequently beheaded in Berlin's Plötzensee Prison: Sally Epstein, a Jewish painter, and Hans Ziegler, a barber. The two had been arrested in August 1933, and were put on trial in May 1934 with a third defendant, Peter Stoll, a tailor. In 2009, the sentences against all three of them were rescinded by the Berlin public prosecutor's office.

=== Funeral ===
Goebbels had been looking for someone to turn into a martyr for the Nazi cause. His first attempt was with Albert Leo Schlageter, a Freikorps member and saboteur, who was caught attempting to blow up a train in the Ruhr region, which was occupied by French troops in retaliation for Germany's not adhering to its schedule of reparation payments. Schlageter was executed by the French and his grave later became a Nazi shrine. There were also the 16 Nazis who had died during the Beer Hall Putsch, and who were honored with a public ceremony every year on the anniversary of the Putsch. A memorial, which passers-by had to salute, was built for them in Munich. With two other party members who headed the list that the party later made of "Those Members of the Movement Who Have Been Murdered", Goebbels did not even make an effort to martyr them.

Goebbels saw in Wessel's shooting the possibility of a propaganda bonanza. He eulogized Wessel in his newspaper, Der Angriff, in overtly Christian tones:

A Christian Socialist! A man who calls out through his deeds: 'Come to me, I shall redeem you!' ... A divine element works in him. making him the man he is and causing him to act in this way and no other. One man must set an example and offer himself up as a sacrifice! Well, then, I am ready!

Goebbels' plan was to turn Wessel's funeral into a mass demonstration full of speeches and processions of SA men in uniform, but he could not get the necessary police permits to do so, even after Wessel's sister requested President Paul von Hindenburg to relent.

Wessel was buried in Berlin on 1 March 1930. Contrary to Nazi claims, there were no attacks on the funeral procession, which Goebbels claimed was watched by 30,000 people. The funeral was filmed and turned into a major propaganda event by the Nazi Party. Wessel was elevated by Goebbels' propaganda apparatus to the status of a leading martyr of the Nazi movement. Many of Goebbels's most effective propaganda speeches were made at gravesides, but Wessel received unusual attention among the many unremembered storm troopers.

In an editorial in the Völkischer Beobachter ("People's Observer"), Alfred Rosenberg wrote that Wessel was not dead, but had joined a combat group that still struggled alongside them. Afterwards, Nazis spoke of how a man who died in conflict had joined "Horst Wessel's combat group" or had been "summoned to Horst Wessel's standard". The Prussian police had outlawed public gatherings and the display of swastikas at the funeral procession, with the exception of a few Nazi Party vehicles. Wessel's coffin was paraded through large parts of the center of Berlin in a procession lasting many hours.

As the coffin reached Bülowplatz, now Rosa-Luxemburg-Platz, Communist hecklers began singing "The Internationale" in an attempt to disrupt the event. The police were unable to prevent abusive shouts and, at some points, flying rocks. No major clashes occurred, although someone had written "To Wessel the pimp, a last Heil Hitler" in white paint on the cemetery wall.

In attendance at Wessel's funeral were Goebbels, who delivered the eulogy, Franz Pfeffer von Salomon, Hermann Göring, and Prince August Wilhelm of Prussia. Prior to the event, Goebbels and Göring had discussed the possibility of Hitler attending. In his diary entry on the day of the funeral, Goebbels recalled: "Hitler isn't coming. Had the situation explained to him over the telephone and he actually declined. Oh well". Goebbels blamed Rudolf Hess for dissuading Hitler from coming, but, in reality, Hitler's decision was based on Göring's advice that the danger of an attack on him in the heart of "Red Berlin" was too great.

== Nazi martyr ==
[Horst Wessel] did a great deal more for the Nazi image as a dead pimp than he had ever done as a live Party member.

— Alan Wykes, The Nuremberg Rallies (1970), p. 121

Although Goebbels could not persuade Hitler to attend Wessel's funeral, Hitler did speak at Wessel's grave three years after his death, on 22 January 1933, for the dedication of a memorial. The memorial, which was cubic in design, had a metal leaning flag and wreath on the top. It featured Horst’s name on the front, and on the back, the names of his father Ludwig and his brother Werner. Hitler called Wessel a "blood witness" whose song had become "a battle hymn for millions". He said that Wessel's sacrifice of his life was "a monument more lasting than stone and bronze".

Sixteen thousand members of the Berlin and Brandenburg SA and SS marched past the Communist Party headquarters on Bülowplatz (now the Rosa-Luxemburg-Platz) – the Karl Liebknecht House – in a deliberately provocative act that Goebbels was very proud of having staged, calling it a "terrible defeat" for the Communists and "a proud and heroic victory of the SA on behalf of the party". He felt that the Communists had "a loss of prestige that could never again be made good", as they were relegated to fuming on the side streets. Once the "enormous procession ... led by Hitler, Goebbels, Ernst Röhm, and other top officials of the [party], ... marched to the St. Nicholas Cemetery ... Hitler spoke of Wessel's death as a symbolic sacrifice."

That night, Hitler addressed a memorial service at the Berlin Sportpalast, at which the "Funeral March" from Richard Wagner's Götterdämmerung was played, and the stage was set as an altar made from "laurel trees, branches, candelabra and a larger-than-lifesize portrait of Wessel". Hitler lavished praise on "those fanatics who are consumed by the great task of their age" – "fanaticism" being a positive virtue among the Nazis – "who live for that task and who die for it ... [they would] later be not only the martyrs of their struggle but also the seed from which the subsequent harvest [would come]".

Two months later, on 21 March 1933, elaborate celebrations organized by Goebbels were held on Potsdam Day for the inauguration of a new Reichstag. The day began with services at both the Catholic and Lutheran churches there, but Hitler and Goebbels did not attend. Instead, they laid wreaths at the graves of various Nazi "martyrs of the revolution", including Wessel's.

The death of Wessel and the proliferation of the "Horst Wessel Song" was an extension of the Nazi cult of martyrs, which included Freikorps member Leo Schlageter and the 15 Nazis and one bystander killed in the Beer Hall Putsch of 1923, who were reburied in Munich with great fanfare on 8 November 1935.

For years, Goebbels continued to use Wessel's "martyrdom" as propaganda. At the 1934 Nuremberg Party Rally, a group of Hitler Youth sang an anti-Christian song which included the lines "We don't need any Christian truth ... We follow not Christ but Horst Wessel". Wessel's name was frequently invoked by the Nazis to bolster the core tenets of National Socialist ideology during the remaining existence of Nazi Germany. For example, a wartime article from the Nazi-owned Völkischer Beobachter newspaper called Wessel "the hero of the Brown Revolution" and referred to his "sacrificial death" that "passionately inflamed millions who followed". The paper further referred to Wessel as "the driving force behind the struggle for freedom of the armed services and the homeland of the Greater German Reich".

== Aftermath ==
=== "Horst Wessel Song" ===
Wessel played the schalmei (Martinstrompete), a brass instrument which featured in groups called Schalmeienkapellen ("Schalmeien orchestras or bands"), and which is still used in folk celebrations. Wessel founded an "SA Schalmeienkapelle" band, which provided music during SA events. In early 1929, Wessel wrote the lyrics for a new Nazi fight song Kampflied ("fight song"), which was first published in Goebbels's newspaper Der Angriff in September, under the title Der Unbekannte SA-Mann ("The Unknown SA-Man").

The song later became known as Die Fahne Hoch ("Raise the Flag") and finally the "Horst-Wessel-Lied" ("Horst Wessel Song"). The Nazis made it their official anthem and, after they came to power, the co-national anthem of Nazi Germany, along with the first stanza of the Deutschlandlied. The song was also played in some Protestant places of worship, as elements of the Protestant Church in Germany had accepted and promulgated the Horst Wessel cult, built as it was by Goebbels on the model of past Christian martyrs.

It was later claimed by the Nazis that Wessel also wrote the music to the song, but it was considered more likely that the tune was in reality adapted from a World War I German Imperial Navy song, and was probably originally a folk song. In 1937, a German court determined that Wessel was not the composer of the melody.

=== Posthumous notability ===
==== Hans Westmar ====
Hans Westmar: One of the Many was one of the first films of the Nazi era to idealize a version of Wessel's life. Goebbels disliked the film, considering it to be crude in its use of propaganda, and on the day of its intended premiere issued a ban prohibiting it from being shown. Putzi Hanfstaengl – an old friend of Hitler's – who was one of the film's backers, and had composed its music, went personally to Hitler and Goebbels to complain about the ban, which was eventually reversed when enough of the Nazi Party hierarchy weighed in on Hanfstaengl's side.

Goebbels insisted on alterations to the film, the primary one being that the main character's name was changed to the fictional "Hans Westmar". Part of the problem with the film was that the authentic depiction of stormtrooper brutality, including violent clashes with Communists, did not fit the more reasonable tone the Nazis initially attempted to present after coming to power. Unlike Wessel, Westmar preaches class reconciliation and does not alienate his family. It was among the first films to associate dying for Hitler as a glorious death for Germany, resulting in his spirit inspiring his comrades.

==== Memorial namings ====
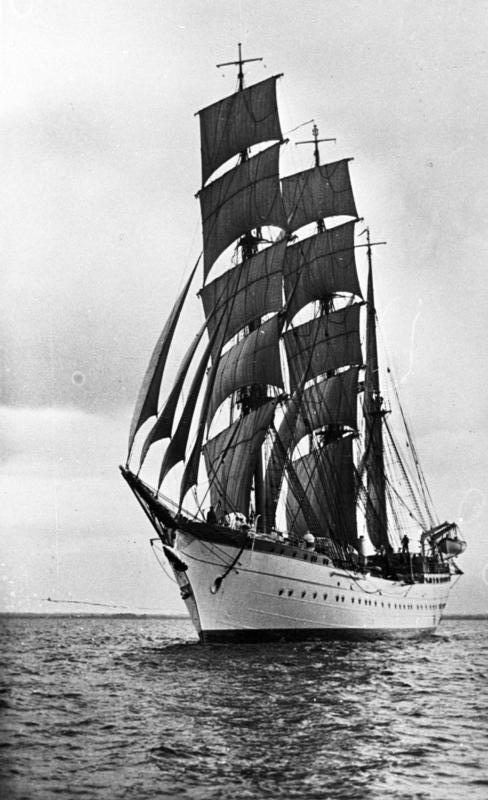
SSS Horst Wessel in 1936

The Berlin district of Friedrichshain, where Wessel died, was renamed "Horst Wessel Stadt", and the Bülowplatz in the Mitte district was renamed "Horst-Wessel-Platz" on 26 May 1933. The U-Bahn station nearby was also renamed. After the war, the name Friedrichshain was restored and Horst-Wessel-Platz in East Berlin became "Liebknechtplatz", after Karl Liebknecht. In 1947 it was renamed "Luxemburg-Platz" after Rosa Luxemburg. It has been called Rosa-Luxemburg-Platz since 1969. Passau named a street Horst-Wessel-Straße.

In 1936, Nazi Germany's Kriegsmarine (navy) commissioned a three-masted training ship and named her the Horst Wessel. The ship was taken as a war prize by the United States after World War II. After repairs and modifications, she was commissioned on 15 May 1946 into the United States Coast Guard as the USCGC Eagle (WIX-327) and remains in service to this day.

In 1938, an area of reclaimed land in the rural area of Eiderstedt in Schleswig-Holstein was named the "Horst Wessel polder". A year later, the school in Berlin where Wessel completed his Abitur examinations was renamed Horst-Wessel-Gymnasium.

Examples of German military units adopting the name of this Nazi-era "martyr" in World War II include the 18th SS Volunteer Panzergrenadier Division, known as the "Horst Wessel" Division, and the Luftwaffe's 26th Destroyer (or heavy fighter) Wing Zerstörergeschwader 26, and its successor day fighter unit Jagdgeschwader 6, which was similarly named the "Horst Wessel" wing.

The Jagdgeschwader 134, formed in 1936, and Jagdgeschwader 142 were also named after Wessel. In 1938, the Nazi Party's Central Publishing House, the Franz Eher Nachfolger Verlag in Munich, published Jagdgeschwader Horst Wessel ("Horst Wessel Fighter Squadron") by Obersturmbannführer Hans Peter Hermel to commemorate the presentation of the squadron to Hitler.

==== Post-war ====
After World War II, Wessel's memorial was vandalized and his remains and the remains of his brother Werner were exhumed and destroyed (the remains of Wessel's father, Ludwig, were left interred). Such activity became common for buried Nazis in East Germany. Much of the memorial grave marker was cut off, removing the metal above, and the names of Wessel and his brother Werner. Afterwards, the gravesite was long marked only by the remaining part of the grave marker, which had been partly recarved and was in use as the headstone of Wessel's father, Ludwig, albeit with the surname "Wessel" removed.

In 2000, a group of anti-fascists claimed to have opened up the grave and thrown his skull into the nearby Spree river. Berlin police later said that the grave had not been disturbed and that no remains had been removed. Later in 2011, a group of anti-Nazi activists attacked Wessel's grave and sprayed the words Keine Ruhe für Nazis! ("No Rest for Nazis!") on the remains of the grave marker.

In August 2013, the grave marker was removed and the grave of Wessel's father was leveled as well, as the church wished to stop the site from being a rallying point for Neo-Nazis. Since 1989, two petitions have been filed asking that Wessel's gravestone be rebuilt and restored to the St. Nicholas Cemetery. Both were denied.

In the modern era, some Neo-Nazi groups have attempted to revive Wessel's name as a symbol. The Young National Democrats (JN), which is the youth wing of the National Democratic Party of Germany (NPD), has previously used his name to attempt to inspire their members.

== In popular culture ==
- In the German television series Babylon Berlin, Wessel is represented by the character "Horst Kessler".

== See also ==
- USCGC Eagle (WIX-327), a training ship originally built in Nazi Germany as the Horst Wessel.
