= Fiddler (mystery series) =

Fiddler is the fictional protagonist in an eight book mystery series by A.E. Maxwell (husband and wife writing team Evan and Ann Maxwell, who also writes as Elizabeth Lowell.) The books in the series are Just Another Day in Paradise (1985), The Frog and the Scorpion (1986), Gatsby's Vineyard (1987), Just Enough Light to Kill (1988), The Art of Survival (1989), Money Burns (1991), The King of Nothing (1992), and Murder Hurts (1993). Fiddler is an independently wealthy Southern California resident with a past who occasionally solves crimes with the assistance of his ex-wife and on-again, off-again lover Fiora Flynn, a successful investment banker. Themes included action and adventure with villains ranging from KGB officers and Colombian drug smugglers to high society artists and corporate executives.
