= Fiddler's Green, Herefordshire =

Hamlet in Herefordshire, England

Coordinates: 52.01895°N 2.62802°W

Fiddler's Green is a hamlet in the English county of Herefordshire. It is located near the River Wye on the B4224 road that connects Hereford and Ross-on-Wye.
