= Pete Fidler =

Peter Fidler
- Genres: Psychedelic rock, bluegrass, jam band
- Occupations: Musician, songwriter
- Instruments: Electric guitar, mandolin, lap steel guitar, dobro, banjo
- Years active: 1996–present
- Labels: Cleopatra; PolyEster; Gravel Road

Peter David Fidler is a dobro player from Melbourne, Australia. He also plays mandolin, lap steel guitar and guitar.

Before playing the dobro, Fidler was guitarist/songwriter in Melbourne-based psychedelic rock band, Tyrnaround. Tyrnaround were formed in 1985 and active until the death of their singer, Michael Philips, in 1999. Fidler wrote one of their best known songs "Colour Your Mind" which was released in 1986.

It was the film O Brother, Where Art Thou? that inspired Fidler to pick up the dobro when he was in his 30s. Fidler released a solo album in 2008, Slide Night, the first Australian dobro album ever recorded. The album was featured on the ABC Radio show 'The Daily Planet', hosted by Lucky Oceans in May 2008. Fidler currently plays with Australian bluegrass band, Bluestone Junction, and has produced their last two CD releases.

Fidler also plays with several other artists, most notably Australian guitar virtuoso Nick Charles, singer-songwriter Bill Jackson (with whom he toured the United States in 2008 and 2010, where they appeared at the International Folk Alliance Convention in Memphis) and Melbourne country-rock singer-songwriter Waz E James.

== Discography ==
=== Tyrnaround ===
- Colour Your Mind – Cleopatra (MLCR 102) (1986)
- "Want of a Rhyme"/"Hello or Goodbye" – PolyEster Records (LUV 5) (1986)
- Succeeds When Daylight Fails – PolyEster (LUV 12) (1989)
- "Uncle Sydney"/"Uncle Jack" – PolyEster (1990)
- Go Back – PolyEster (LUV 25) (1992)

=== Solo ===
- Slide Night – Independent (2008)

=== Bluestone Junction ===
- Lonesome Traveller – Independent
- Turn Your Radio On – Independent (May 2009)

=== Waz E James Band ===
- Hair of the Dog – Gravel Road (GRR0001A) (2004)
- Watermelon – Gravel Road (GRR0001) (2009)
