= Rudolf Diels =

First Gestapo chief (1900–1957)

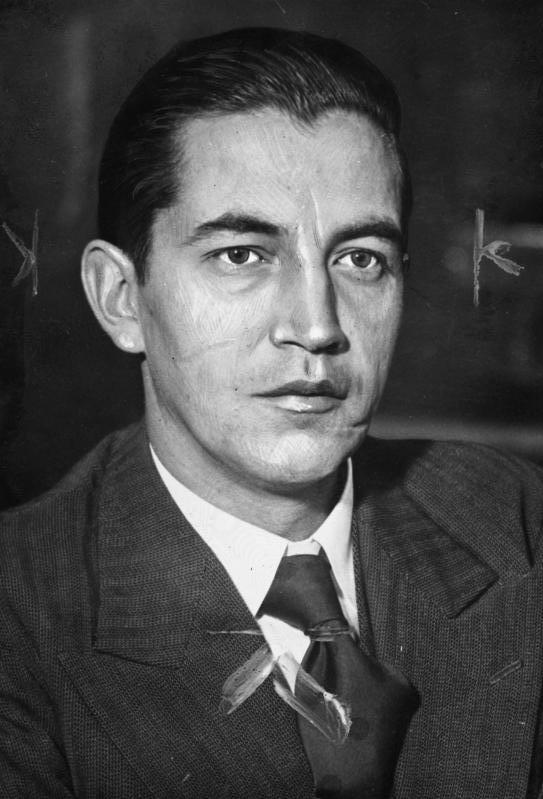
- Diels in 1933

Director of the Gestapo
- In office 26 April 1933 – 20 April 1934
- Appointed by: Hermann Göring
- President: Paul von Hindenburg
- Chancellor: Adolf Hitler
- Preceded by: None (office established)
- Succeeded by: Reinhard Heydrich

Personal details
- Born: 16 December 1900 Berghausen, Hesse-Nassau, Prussia, German Empire
- Died: 18 November 1957 (aged 56) Katzenelnbogen, Rhineland-Palatinate, West Germany
- Cause of death: Accidental gunshot wound
- Party: Nazi Party
- Spouse(s): Hildegard Mannesmann; Ilse Göring

Rudolf Diels (16 December 1900 – 18 November 1957) was a German civil servant and first head of the Gestapo from 1933 to 1934. He obtained the rank of SS-Oberführer and was a protégé of Hermann Göring.

Diels was forced from the Gestapo by Reichsführer-SS Heinrich Himmler. Aided by Göring, he later held several government posts: serving as assistant police commissioner of Berlin and the administrative president of Cologne. In the 1940s, Diels refused to participate in anti-Jewish initiatives.

Diels was imprisoned in 1944 after the July bomb plot to kill Adolf Hitler. He survived the war, and worked in the post-war government of Lower Saxony.

== Early life ==
Diels was born in Berghausen in the Taunus, the son of a farmer. He went to school in Wiesbaden. He served in the army towards the end of World War I and was posted in Haguenau, Alsace in an intelligence role. After the war, he studied law at the University of Marburg from 1919. At university, he had a reputation as a drinker and philanderer. While there he also received a number of dueling scars resulting from the academic fencing once practised by young upper-class Austrians and Germans.

== Gestapo chief ==
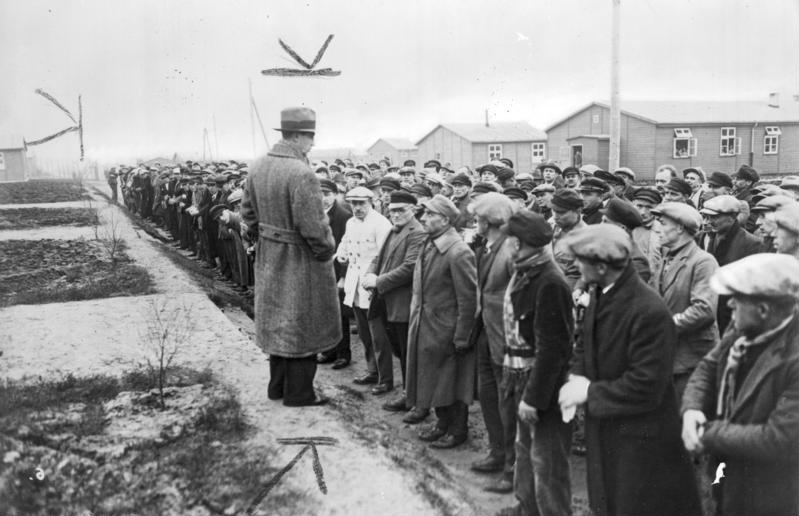
December 1933: Rudolf Diels addressing inmates at KZ Esterwegen, which was under control of the Prussian Interior Ministry

He joined the Prussian interior ministry in 1930 and was promoted to an advisory position in the Prussian police in 1932, targeting political radicals, both Communists and Nazis. He was head of the Prussian Political Police when Adolf Hitler came to power on 30 January 1933. Göring was made minister president for Prussia in April of that year, replacing Carl Severing, and was impressed with Diels' work and new-found commitment to the Nazi Party. Diels became a protégé of Göring. In April 1933, Göring appointed him as chief of the new Prussian state police department 1A, concerned with political crimes. Department 1A was soon renamed the Geheime Staatspolizei (Secret State Police), or Gestapo. During this time, he had a romantic relationship with Martha Dodd, the daughter of the US ambassador to Germany.

On 27 February 1933, the Reichstag fire occurred, and Diels was the main interrogator of the principal accused, Marinus van der Lubbe. He told Hitler he thought that the fire was set by this single man. However, Hitler was convinced it was the Communists. Diels attracted the attention of political rivals, including SS chief Heinrich Himmler and his deputy, Reinhard Heydrich. In 1933 and 1934, Himmler and Heydrich took over the political police of state after state. Soon, only Prussia was left outside their control.

Concerned that Diels was not ruthless enough to effectively counteract the power of the Sturmabteilung (SA), Göring handed over control of the Gestapo to Himmler on 20 April 1934. Also on that date, Hitler appointed Himmler chief of all German police outside Prussia. Heydrich, named chief of the Gestapo by Himmler on 22 April 1934, also continued as head of the SS Security Service, the Sicherheitsdienst (SD). Effectively smeared, but with Göring's aid, Diels narrowly avoided execution during the Night of the Long Knives at the end of June 1934, fleeing his post for five weeks. Thereafter, he was briefly Deputy Police President of Berlin before being appointed Regierungspräsident (administrative president) of the local government of Cologne in 1934. Diels was then appointed administrative president of Hannover in 1936.

He maintained his association with Göring, marrying his cousin, Ilse Göring. In the 1940s, Diels refused to participate in anti-Jewish initiatives. He was later arrested by the Gestapo in 1944 after the 20 July Plot to assassinate Hitler and imprisoned, but survived.

== Post-war ==
Diels presented an affidavit for the prosecution at the Nuremberg trials, but was also summoned to testify by Göring's defense lawyer. He was interned until 1948. After 1950, he served in the post-war government of Lower Saxony, and then in the Ministry of the Interior, until his retirement in 1953.

== Published works ==
Diels' memoirs, Lucifer Ante Portas: Von Severing bis Heydrich ("The Devil at the Gate: From Von Severing to Heydrich"), were published in 1950. It was released in the German weekly Der Spiegel between May and July 1949 in nine episodes. A less cautious work was published after his retirement, Der Fall Otto John ("The Case of Otto John") (1954).

== Death ==
Diels died on 18 November 1957 when his rifle accidentally discharged while he was hunting.

== Sources ==
- Flaherty, T. H. (2004) [1988]. The Third Reich: The SS. Time-Life. ISBN 1-84447-073-3.
- Hamilton, Charles (1984). Leaders & Personalities of the Third Reich, Vol. 1. R. James Bender Publishing. ISBN 0-912138-27-0.
- Larson, Erik (2011). In the Garden of Beasts: Love, Terror, and an American Family in Hitler's Berlin. Crown Publishing Group. ISBN 978-0-307-40884-6.
- Miller, Michael (2006). Leaders of the SS and German Police, Vol. 1. San Jose, CA: R. James Bender. ISBN 978-93-297-0037-2.
- Williams, Max (2001). Reinhard Heydrich: The Biography, Volume 1—Road to War. Church Stretton: Ulric Publishing. ISBN 978-0-9537577-5-6.
- Zentner, Christian; Bedürftig, Friedemann (1991). The Encyclopedia of the Third Reich. New York: MacMillan. ISBN 978-0-02-897500-9.
