= List of Nazi Party leaders and officials =

This is a list of Nazi Party (NSDAP) leaders and officials. It is not meant to be an all-inclusive list.

Hermann Göring and Heinrich Himmler

== A ==
- Gunter d'Alquen – Chief editor of the SS official newspaper, Das Schwarze Korps ("The Black Corps"), and commander of the SS-Standarte Kurt Eggers.
- Ludolf von Alvensleben – commander of the SS and police in Crimea and commander of the Selbstschutz (self-defense) of the Reichsgau Danzig-West Prussia.
- Max Amann – Reichsleiter for the Press, president of the Reich Press Chamber and head of the Nazi publishing house Eher Verlag. He was also an SS-Obergruppenführer.
- Benno von Arent – Responsible for art, theaters and movies in Nazi Germany.
- Heinz Auerswald – Commissioner for the Jewish residential district in Warsaw from April 1941 to November 1942.
- Artur Axmann – Chief of the Social Office of the Reich Youth Leadership. Leader of the Hitler Youth from 1940 to 1945.

== B ==
- Erich von dem Bach-Zelewski – An SS-Obergruppenführer und General der Polizei, he was the commander of the "Bandenkampfverbände" SS units responsible for the mass murder of 35,000 civilians in Riga and more than 200,000 in Belarus and eastern Poland.
- Herbert Backe – State Secretary (1933–1944) in the Reich Ministry of Food and Agriculture and later Reich Minister (1944–1945), he was also an SS-Obergruppenführer. An architect of the infamous Hunger Plan.
- Richard Baer – Commander of the Auschwitz I concentration camp from May 1944 to February 1945.
- Alfred Baeumler – Philosopher who interpreted the works of Friedrich Nietzsche in order to legitimize Nazism.
- Klaus Barbie – An SS-Hauptsturmführer, he was head of the Gestapo in Lyon. Nicknamed "the Butcher of Lyon" for his use of torture on prisoners.
- Josef Berchtold – Very early Party member and a member of Stoßtrupp-Hitler. Became the second Reichsführer-SS from 1926 to 1927.
- Gottlob Berger – Chief of staff for the Waffen-SS and head of the SS Main Office. He was an SS-Obergruppenführer and General of the Waffen-SS.
- Werner Best – SS-Obergruppenführer and Reich Plenipotentiary for Nazi-occupied Denmark.
- Hans Biebow – Chief of Administration of the Łódź Ghetto.
- Helmut Bischoff – SS-Obersturmbannführer and commander of mobile death squad unit, Einsatzkommando 1/IV. Also a Gestapo officer and head of security for Nazi Germany's V-weapons program.
- Paul Blobel – SS commander primarily responsible for the Babi Yar massacre at Kiev.
- Werner von Blomberg – Generalfeldmarschall, Defense Minister 1933–1935, Minister of War and Commander-in-Chief of the Armed Forces 1935–1938. Forced out in the Blomberg-Fritsch Affair.
- Hans-Friedrich Blunck – Propagandist and head of the Reich Literature Chamber between 1933 and 1935.
- Ernst Boepple – State Secretary of the General Government in Poland, serving as deputy to Deputy Governor Josef Bühler. Deeply implicated in the "Final Solution".
- Ernst Wilhelm Bohle – Gauleiter of the Nazi Party/Foreign Organization from 1933 until 1945, he was also an SS-Obergruppenführer.
- Otto von Bolschwing – Member of the SD-foreign branch and deputy to Adolf Eichmann, played a major role in organizing the 1941 Bucharest pogrom.
- Albert Bormann – Adjutant in Chancellery of the Führer from 1931, in 1938 he became Chief of Main Office I, dealing with the personal affairs of the Führer. He was also a Gruppenführer in the National Socialist Motor Corps (NSKK).
- Martin Bormann – Reichsleiter, head of the Party Chancellery (Parteikanzlei) and Secretary to the Führer, Adolf Hitler. Also an SS-Obergruppenführer, he committed suicide in May 1945. Convicted of war crimes and sentenced to death in absentia by the Nuremberg Tribunal.

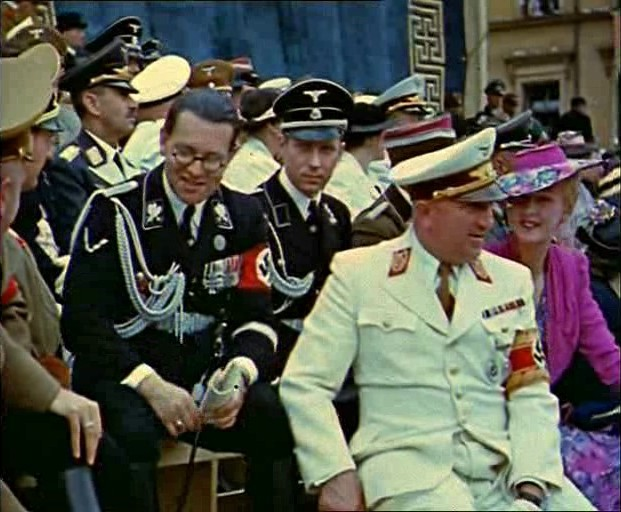
(from left) Philip Bouhler, Karl Freiherr Michel von Tüßling, Robert Ley with his wife Inge; Munich, July 1939

- Philipp Bouhler – Reichsleiter, Chief of the Chancellery of the Führer of the NSDAP and leader of the Aktion T4 euthanasia program. Also an SS-Obergruppenführer, he committed suicide in May 1945.
- Fritz Bracht – Gauleiter of Gau Upper Silesia and Oberpräsident of the Prussian Province of Upper Silesia (1941–1945) and an SA-Obergruppenführer.
- Viktor Brack – Organizer of the Euthanasia program, Operation T4 and one of the men responsible for the gassing of Jews in the extermination camps. In 1936, he was also appointed chief of Hauptamt II (main office II) in the Chancellery of the Führer.
- Otto Bradfisch – Commander of the Security Police in Łódź and Potsdam.
- Karl Brandt – Personal physician of Adolf Hitler in August 1944 and co-headed the administration of the Aktion T4 euthanasia program from 1939. He was an SS-Gruppenführer.
- Walther von Brauchitsch – Generalfeldmarschall, Commander-in-Chief of the German Army 1938–1941.
- Franz Breithaupt, An SS-Obergruppenführer und General der Waffen-SS, he was Chief of the SS Court Main Office from 1942 to 1945, with exclusive jurisdiction for conducting investigations and trials of SS personnel.
- Helmuth Brückner – A participant in the Beer Hall Putsch, he was Gauleiter of Gau Silesia from 1925 and Oberpräsident of the Prussian provinces of both Upper Silesia and Lower Silesia from 1933. An SA-Gruppenführer, he was removed from office and expelled from the Party in December 1934 in the aftermath of the Röhm Putsch.
- Alois Brunner – Commander of the Drancy internment camp outside Paris from June 1943 to August 1944.
- Walter Buch – Jurist, Reichsleiter, Chairman of the Uschla 1927–1933 and Supreme Party Judge 1934–1945. He was an SS-Obergruppenführer.
- Friedrich Buchardt – Member of the Einsatzgruppen death squads, who started off grading people on their Germanness and then progressed to outright genocide. Attributed to having been responsible for sending tens of thousands to their deaths, avoided justice by working for the Allied powers as an "Intelligence Source" on the Soviets.
- Josef Bühler – The State Secretary of the General Government in Kraków, he served as deputy to Hans Frank. He was a participant at the Wannsee Conference and was hanged as a war criminal by Poland in 1948.
- Josef Bürckel – A Gauleiter from 1926 in the Rhinepfalz and the Saarland (later, Gau Westmark) from 1935. An SS-Obergruppenführer, he was Chief of Civil Administration in occupied Lorraine. He was also Gauleiter and Reichsstatthalter (Reich Governor) in Vienna 1938–1940. He died in 1944.
- Wilhelm Burgdorf – General of the Wehrmacht and Chief of its personnel office.
- Anton Burger – Commandant of concentration camp Theresienstadt between 1943 and 1944.

== C ==
- Werner Catel – Professor of Neurology and Psychiatry at the University of Leipzig, considered an expert on the program of euthanasia for children and participated in the Aktion T4 program.
- Leonardo Conti – Head of the Reich Physicians' Chamber (Reichsärztekammer) and leader of the National Socialist German Doctors' League (1939–1944). He was an SS-Obergruppenführer and participated in the Aktion T4 euthanasia program.

== D ==
- Kurt Daluege – SS-Oberstgruppenführer und Generaloberst der Polizei as chief of the Ordnungspolizei (uniformed police); from 1942 he ruled the Protectorate of Bohemia and Moravia as Acting Protector after Reinhard Heydrich's assassination.
- Leopold Damian – SA-Obergruppenführer and Chief of the Supreme SA Court from 1937 to 1941. He was also an associate lay judge on the Supreme Party Court and the People's Court.
- Richard Walther Darré – Reichsleiter, Reich Peasant Leader and Reich Minister of Food and Agriculture from 1933 to 1942. He was an SS-Obergruppenführer and head of the SS Race and Settlement Main Office 1932–38.
- Rudolf Diels – Protégé of Hermann Göring. First Chief of the Gestapo from 26 April 1933 to 20 April 1934. An SS-Oberführer, he was the Regierungspräsident (District President) of the Cologne district (1934–1936) and the Hanover district (1936–1942).
- Josef "Sepp" Dietrich – SS-Oberstgruppenführer in the Waffen-SS; original commander of Leibstandarte SS Adolf Hitler (LSSAH); later commander of the 6th SS Panzer Army.
- Otto Dietrich – Reichsleiter, Reich Press Chief, Vice-President of the Reich Press Chamber, State Secretary in the Ministry of Propaganda and an SS-Obergruppenführer.
- Oskar Dirlewanger – A SS-Oberführer and war criminal, he commanded the Dirlewanger Brigade consisting of amnestied Germans convicted of major crimes and probationary troops.
- Karl Dönitz – Großadmiral, Führer der Unterseeboote (Commander of Submarines) 1936–1943, Commander-in-Chief of the Kriegsmarine 1943–1945 and the last head of state of Nazi Germany following Hitler's suicide.
- Franz Xaver Dorsch – A participant in the Beer Hall Putsch, he was Fritz Todt's deputy as chief engineer in the Organization Todt (OT). Dorsch played a leading role in the construction of the Siegfried Line and the Atlantic Wall. After Todt's death, he remained OT deputy under Albert Speer and succeeded him as head of the OT in April 1944.
- Richard Drauz – Kreisleiter of Heilbronn.
- Otto-Heinrich Drechsler – Bürgermeister of Lübeck (1933–1945) he was an SS-Brigadeführer and Generalkommissar of occupied Latvia from 1941 to 1945.
- Anton Drexler – A founder and Chairman of the German Workers' Party, the precursor to the Nazi Party. He was a co-author of the National Socialist Program and Chairman of the Nazi Party from February 1920 to July 1921 when he was succeeded by Adolf Hitler.

== E ==
- Irmfried Eberl – Commandant of Treblinka extermination camp, July to September 1942.
- Dietrich Eckart – A founder of the German Workers' Party, a precursor to the Nazi Party, he was the first editor of Völkischer Beobachter and a participant in the Beer Hall Putsch.
- Joachim Albrecht Eggeling – Gauleiter of Gau Magdeburg-Anhalt (1935–1937) and Gau Halle-Merseburg (1937–1945); Oberpräsident of the Prussian Province of Halle-Merseburg from 1944; and an SS-Obergruppenführer.
- Adolf Eichmann – SS-Obersturmbannführer. Official in charge of RSHA Referat IV B4 (RSHA Sub-Department IV-B4); responsible for facilitation and transportation of Jews to ghettos and extermination camps. Fled to Argentina; captured there by Mossad operatives in 1960, tried in Israel and executed on 1 June 1962.
- Theodor Eicke – An SS-Obergruppenführer and one of the executioners of Ernst Röhm. A leading figure in the establishment of the concentration camps system, he was Commandant of Dachau, Concentration Camps Inspector from 1934 to 1939 and then commander of the 3rd SS Panzer Division Totenkopf.
- August Eigruber – Gauleiter and Reichsstatthalter of Reichsgau Upper Danube; Landeshauptmann of Upper Austria; Obergruppenführer in both the SA and the SS.
- Franz Ritter von Epp – Reichsleiter, Reichsstatthalter of Bavaria, head of the NSDAP Office of Colonial Policy and General of Infantry.
- Hermann Esser – Early member of the Nazi Party; propagandist; editor of Nazi newspaper Völkischer Beobachter; Second Vice-President of the Reichstag; State Secretary in the Reich Ministry of Propaganda (1938–1945).
- Richard Euringer – Writer who selected 18,000 "unsuitable" books, which did not conform to Nazi ideology and were publicly burned.

== F ==
- Gottfried Feder – An economic theorist, he was a founder of the German Workers' Party, a precursor to the Nazi Party. He was Hitler's mentor on economic issues, was co-author of the National Socialist Program and a participant in the Beer Hall Putsch.
- Hermann Fegelein – An SS-Gruppenführer und Generalleutnant der Waffen-SS, he was married to Eva Braun’s sister, Gretl. The SS Liaison Officer to Hitler’s headquarters, he was shot for desertion in April 1945.
- Karl Fiehler – Reichsleiter for Municipal Politics and Oberburgomeister of Munich from 1933 to 1945. He was also an SS-Obergruppenführer.
- Friedrich Karl Florian – Gauleiter of Gau Düsseldorf and an SA-Obergruppenführer.
- Albert Forster – Reichsstatthalter and Gauleiter of Reichsgau Danzig-West Prussia from 1939 to 1945, he was an SS-Obergruppenführer.
- Hans Frank – A lawyer, he was Hitler's legal advisor, an Uschla judge, Reichsleiter for Legal Issues, Bavarian Minister of Justice, President of the Academy for German Law (1933–1942) Reich Minister without portfolio and Governor-General of occupied Poland. He was also an SA-Obergruppenführer. Involved in perpetration of the Holocaust, he was convicted of war crimes and hanged by the Nuremberg Tribunal.
- Karl Hermann Frank – Prominent Sudeten-German Nazi official and SS-Obergruppenführer who served as Minister of State and Higher SS and Police Leader in the Protectorate of Bohemia and Moravia.
- Roland Freisler – State Secretary of Adolf Hitler's Reich Ministry of Justice; President of the Volksgerichtshof (People's Court) from 1942 to 1945; sentenced hundreds of people to death, including Sophie Scholl, Hans Scholl and various members of the 20 July Plot; killed while returning to the courthouse to collect some files during an air raid on Berlin.
- Wilhelm Frick – Reichsleiter, Reich Minister of Interior (1933–1943); Protector of Bohemia and Moravia (1943–1945). Convicted of war crimes and hanged by the Nuremberg Tribunal.
- Hans-Georg von Friedeburg – General Admiral in the Kriegsmarine, he succeeded Karl Dönitz as Commander of U-boats in 1943 and as Navy Commander-in-Chief in 1945.
- Werner von Fritsch – Generaloberst, Commander-in-Chief of the Army from 1935 to 1938. Forced out in the Blomberg-Fritsch Affair.
- Hans Fritzsche – Head of the Press Division and then the Radio Division at the Reich Ministry for Propaganda.
- Walther Funk – State Secretary in the Reich Ministry of Propaganda (1933–1937) Reich Minister for Economics (1938–1945) and President of the Reichsbank (1939–1945).

== G ==
- Karl Gebhardt – Personal physician of Heinrich Himmler; one of the main perpetrators of surgical experiments performed on concentration camp inmates at Ravensbrück and Auschwitz.
- Achim Gercke – Expert on racial matters at the Ministry of the Interior. Devised the system of racial prophylaxis, forbidding intermarriage between Jews and Aryans.
- Karl Gerland – Gauleiter of Gau Electoral Hesse from 1943 and Oberpräsident of the Prussian Province of Kurhessen from 1944, he was an SS-Gruppenführer.
- Paul Giesler – Gauleiter of Gau Westphalia-South (1941–1943) and Gau Munich-Upper Bavaria (1942–1945). He was also Minister President of Bavaria from 1942, an SA-Obergruppenfuhrer and was named Minister of the Interior in Hitler's will.
- Herbert Otto Gille – SS-Obergruppenfuhrer; Waffen-SS General. Awarded the Knight's Cross with Oakleaves, Swords and Diamonds and the German Cross in Gold, became the most highly decorated Waffen-SS member during World War II.
- Odilo Globocnik – A prominent Austrian Nazi, as an SS-Obergruppenführer he was an SS and Police Leader in the General Government and in the Operational Zone of the Adriatic Littoral. As head of Operation Reinhard he was one of those responsible for the murder of millions of people during the Holocaust.
- Richard Glücks – SS-Gruppenführer and Generalleutnant of the Waffen-SS, he was Concentration Camps Inspector (CCI) after Eicke, from 1939 to 1945, and committed suicide in May 1945.
- (Paul) Joseph Goebbels – One of Adolf Hitler's closest associates and most devout followers, known for zealous oratory and antisemitism. Reichsleiter, Gauleiter of Gau Berlin, and Reich Minister for Public Enlightenment and Propaganda throughout Nazi Germany, he became Reich Plenipotentiary for Total War and Stadtpräsident of Berlin in 1944. Named Reich Chancellor in Hitler's will, he held this position for only one day before his own suicide.
- Hermann Göring – Hitler's designated successor (until expelled from office by Hitler in late April 1945); President of the Reichstag; Minister President and Interior Minister of Prussia; Reich Aviation Minister; Luftwaffe Commander-in-Chief; Delegate for the Four Year Plan; and Chairman of the Council of Ministers for the Defense of the Reich. As Reichsmarschall, the highest-ranking military officer in the Third Reich; sole holder of the Grand Cross of the Iron Cross; sentenced to death by the Nuremberg Tribunal but committed suicide hours before his scheduled hanging; World War I veteran as ace fighter pilot; participated in the Beer Hall Putsch; founder of the Gestapo.
- Artur Görlitzer – Deputy Gauleiter of Gau Berlin, 1933–1943. An SA-Gruppenfuhrer.
- Amon Göth – SS-Hauptsturmführer. Nazi concentration camp commandant at Płaszów, General Government, German-occupied Poland.
- Ulrich Graf – Member of the Stoßtrupp-Hitler, he was wounded in the Beer Hall Putsch. He was an Uschla judge, Munich City Councillor and SS-Brigadeführer.
- Robert Ritter von Greim – Luftwaffe Generalfeldmarschall and last Luftwaffe Commander-in-Chief succeeding the deposed Hermann Göring in the last days of World War II.
- Arthur Greiser – Reichsstatthalter and Gauleiter of Reichsgau Wartheland from 1939 to 1945, he was an Obergruppenfuhrer in both the SS and the National Socialist Motor Corps (NSKK).
- Wilhelm Grimm – Reichsleiter; Chairman of the Second Chamber of the Supreme Party Court 1932–1939 and an SS-Gruppenführer. Died in a car accident in 1944.
- Josef Grohé – Gauleiter of Gau Cologne-Aachen and Reichskommissar for Reichskommissariat of Belgium and Northern France, he was an Obergruppenführer in the National Socialist Motor Corps (NSKK).
- Walter Groß – Chief of the Nazi Party (NSDAP)'s Racial Policy Office. Implicated in the Final Solution.
- Kurt Gruber – First chairman of the Hitler Youth (1926–1931).
- Hans Friedrich Karl Günther – Academic, teaching racial theory and eugenics.
- Franz Gürtner – Minister of Justice in Bavaria (1922–1932) he became Reich Minister of Justice from 1932 to his death in 1941.

== H ==
- Eugen Hadamovsky – National programming director for German radio; chief of staff in the Nazi Party's Central Propaganda Office (Reichspropagandaleitung) in Berlin from 1942 to 1944.
- Heinrich Hager – SA-Oberführer. Elected at Reichstag 1932 to his death in 1941. Leader of SA Brigade 77.
- Karl Hanke – A State Secretary in the Ministry of Propaganda (1937–1941); Gauleiter of Gau Lower Silesia and Oberpräsident of the Prussian Province of Lower Silesia from 1941 to 1945; the last Reichsführer-SS (after Himmler was expelled from office by Hitler) from late April to early May 1945.
- Fritz Hartjenstein – SS-Obersturmbannführer. Concentration camp commandant at Auschwitz-Birkenau, Natzweiler and Flossenbürg.
- Paul Hausser – SS-Oberstgruppenführer; Generaloberst der Waffen-SS. First commander of the military SS-Verfügungstruppe (SS-VT) that grew into the Waffen-SS, in which he was a prominent field commander.
- Franz Hayler – State Secretary and Deputy to the Reich Economics Minister during the latter part of World War II.
- Martin Heidegger – Eminent philosopher; NSDAP member who supported Hitler after he became Chancellor in 1933.
- Erhard Heiden – Founding member of the Schutzstaffel (SS); its third Reichsführer from 1927 to 1929.
- Edmund Heines – An early Party member, he participated in the Beer Hall Putsch. Deputy Gauleiter of Gau Silesia, Police President of Breslau and an SA-Obergruppenführer, he was the Deputy to Stabschef Ernst Röhm from 1931 and was executed during the Night of the Long Knives.
- August Heißmeyer – An SS-Obergruppenführer, he led the SS Main Office (1935–1939) and was the Higher SS and Police Leader for Berlin and Brandenburg (1939–1945).
- Wolf-Heinrich Graf von Helldorff – An SA-Obergruppenführer and General der Polizei, he was Police President of Potsdam (1933–1935) and Berlin (1935–1944) where he led anti-Jewish riots. Involved in the 20 July Plot, he was executed in 1944.
- Otto Hellmuth – Gauleiter of Gau Mainfranken and an Obergruppenführer in the National Socialist Motor Corps (NSKK).
- Konrad Henlein – A Sudeten German, he founded the Sudeten German Party and was the Gauleiter and Reichsstatthalter of Reichsgau Sudetenland and an SS-Obergruppenführer.
- Rudolf Hess (not to be confused with Rudolf Höß) – Reichsleiter, SS-Obergruppenführer and Deputy Führer to Hitler until his flight to Scotland on the eve of the German invasion of the Soviet Union in June 1941.
- Walther Hewel – An early Party member and a participant in the Beer Hall Putsch. He was a protégé of Foreign Minister Joachim von Ribbentrop, a "Special Ambassador" and the Foreign Office liaison to Hitler. He was a personal friend of Hitler and an SS-Brigadeführer.
- Werner Heyde – Psychiatrist; one of the main organizers of the T-4 Euthanasia Program.
- Reinhard Heydrich – SS-Obergruppenführer; General der Polizei, Chief of the RSHA or Reichssicherheitshauptamt (Reich Security Main Office: including the Gestapo, SD and Kripo police agencies); Stellvertretender Reichsprotektor (Deputy Reich-Protector) of Bohemia and Moravia. He was Himmler's "right-hand man", and considered a principal architect of the Night of the Long Knives and the Final Solution. Assassinated in Prague in 1942 by British-trained Czech commandos.
- Konstantin Hierl – Reichsleiter and head of the Reichsarbeitsdienst; associate of Adolf Hitler before he came to power.
- Friedrich Hildebrandt – Gauleiter and Reichsstatthalter of Gau Mecklenburg. He was also an SS-Obergruppenführer.
- Richard Hildebrandt – SS-Obergruppenführer; head of the SS Race and Settlement Main Office 1940–43; held HSSPF posts in Poland and Russia; executed in Poland in 1951.
- Erich Hilgenfeldt – Head of the National Socialist People's Welfare and an SS-Gruppenführer.
- Heinrich Himmler – Reichsführer-SS. As head of the SS, Chief of the German Police and later Reich Minister of the Interior, one of the most powerful men in the Third Reich. Reichsleiter, Commander-in-Chief of the Replacement Army and Reich Commissioner for the Consolidation of German Nationhood. Expelled from offices by Hitler in late April 1945.
- Hans Hinkel – Journalist; Commissioner at the Reich Ministry for the People's Enlightenment and Propaganda.
- August Hirt – Chairman at the Reich University in Strasbourg; instigated a plan to build a study-collection of specialized human anatomical specimens from over 100 murdered Jews. Allied discovery of corpses, paperwork and statements of laboratory assistants led to war crimes trial preparation, which he avoided through suicide.
- Adolf Hitler – Politician; leader of the National Socialist German Workers' Party (German: Nationalsozialistische Deutsche Arbeiterpartei, abbreviated NSDAP), commonly known as the Nazi Party. Dictator of Germany from 1934 to 1945, with titles of Chancellor from 1933 to 1945 and head of state (Führer und Reichskanzler) from 1934 to 1945.
- Franz Hofer – Gauleiter and Reichsstatthalter of Reichsgau Tirol-Vorarlberg; Landeshauptmann of Tyrol; Supreme Commissioner of the Operation Zone of the Alpine Foothills. He was an advocate for creating an Alpine Fortress as a last stand redoubt for Nazi forces. He was an NSKK-Obergruppenführer.
- Otto Hofmann – SS-Obergruppenführer; head of the SS Race and Settlement Main Office 1940–43; HSSPF Southwestern Germany; Wannsee Conference participant.
- Albert Hoffmann – The Gauleiter of Gau Westphalia-South from 1943 to 1945, at the same time he was Deputy to Goebbels in his capacity as Reich Inspector for Civil Air Warfare Measures and an SS-Gruppenführer.
- Hermann Höfle – Deputy to Odilo Globocnik in the Aktion Reinhard program. Played a key role in the "Harvest Festival" massacre of Jewish inmates of various labor camps in the Lublin district of Nazi-occupied Poland in early November 1943.
- Peter Högl – A policeman in the Kriminalpolizei, he became an SS-Obersturmbannführer and Deputy to Johann Rattenhuber in the Reichssicherheitsdienst (Reich Security Service) that provided personal protection for Hitler and other Nazi leaders.
- Rudolf Höß – (not to be confused with Rudolf Hess) – SS-Obersturmbannführer; Commandant of Auschwitz concentration camp.
- Karl Holz – protégé of rabid antisemitic journalist Julius Streicher, he was editor-in-chief at Der Stürmer and Deputy Gauleiter of Gau Franconia for many years, becoming Gauleiter in 1942. He was also an SA-Gruppenführer.
- Franz Josef Huber – former Munich political police department inspector with Heinrich Müller; in 1938 appointed chief of the Security Police (SiPo) and Gestapo for Vienna and the "Lower Danube", and "Upper Danube" regions of Austria.
- Adolf Hühnlein – Reichsleiter; Korpsführer (Corps Leader) of the National Socialist Motor Corps (NSKK) from 1934 until his death in 1942.

== J ==
- Karl Jäger – SS officer; Einsatzkommando leader; author of the "Jäger Report" giving details of mass murders in Lithuania between July and December 1941.
- Friedrich Jeckeln – An SS-Obergruppenführer and General der Polizei und Waffen-SS, he was the Higher SS and Police Leader in Ukraine and, later, in Ostland. He was in charge of one of the largest collection of Einsatzgruppen and personally responsible for ordering the deaths of over 100,000 Jews, Slavs and Roma.
- Alfred Jodl – Generaloberst; Chief of the Operations Staff of the Armed Forces High Command (Oberkommando der Wehrmacht, or OKW) during World War II, acting as deputy to Field Marshal Wilhelm Keitel. Convicted of war crimes and hanged by the Nuremberg Tribunal.
- Hanns Johst – Playwright and Nazi Party poet laureate.
- Rudolf Jordan – Gauleiter of Gau Halle-Merseburg (1931–1937) and Gau Magdeburg-Anhalt (1937–1945); Reichsstatthalter of Brunswick and Anhalt; Minister President of Anhalt; Oberpräsident of the Prussian Province of Magdeburg from 1944; and an SA-Obergruppenführer.
- Hugo Jury – Gauleiter and Reichsstatthalter of Reichsgau Lower Danube; Landeshauptmann of Lower Austria; SS-Obergruppenführer.
- Hans Jüttner – SS-Obergruppenführer; head of the SS-Führungshauptamt (SS Leadership Main Office) or SS-FHA.
- Rudolf Jung – An instrumental force and agitator of German-Czech National Socialism and, later on, a member of the German Nazi Party.

== K ==
- Ernst Kaltenbrunner – SS-Obergruppenführer; General der Polizei und Waffen-SS. Chief of the RSHA (Reich Security Main Office), a main office of the SS, from January 1943 to Germany's surrender in May 1945. Convicted of war crimes and hanged by the Nuremberg Tribunal.
- Hans Kammler – SS-Obergruppenführer und General der Waffen-SS, he was the SS Construction Projects and V-2 program director.
- Siegfried Kasche – German Plenipotentiary Minister to the allied Independent State of Croatia.
- Emil Kaschub – Physician who conducted experiments on Nazi concentration camp prisoners.
- Karl Kaufmann – Nazi Party founding member; Gauleiter of Gau Hamburg; Reichsstatthalter of Hamburg; Reichskommissar for Overseas Shipping and an Obergruppenführer in both the SS and the National Socialist Motor Corps (NSKK).
- Wilhelm Keitel – Generalfeldmarschall and head of the Oberkommando der Wehrmacht (High Command of the Armed Forces) during World War II. Convicted of war crimes and hanged by the Nuremberg Tribunal.
- Hanns Kerrl – Reich Minister of Church Affairs and First Deputy President of the Reichstag until his death in 1941.
- Dietrich Klagges – Minister President of the Free State of Brunswick between 1933 and 1945.
- Matthias Kleinheisterkamp – SS-Obergruppenführer; divisional leader of SS divisions Das Reich and Nord.
- Herbert Klemm – A lawyer and SA-Oberführer. The last State Secretary in the Reich Ministry of Justice (1944-1945) and the acting Reichsminister for Justice in the Flensburg government, he was sentenced to life imprisonment for war crimes and crimes against humanity in the Judges' Trial but was released in 1957.
- Hans Ulrich Klintzsch – Second head of the SA, from 1921 to 1923.
- Gerhard Klopfer – As State Secretary in the Party Chancellery, he was the chief deputy to Martin Bormann and was a participant in the Wannsee Conference. He also was an SS-Gruppenführer.
- Helmut Knochen – Senior commander of the Sicherheitspolizei (Security Police) in Paris in Nazi-occupied France.
- Erich Koch – Gauleiter of Gau East Prussia from 1928 to 1945, Oberpräsident of the Prussian Province of East Prussia from 1933 and Reichskomissar in the Reichskommissariat Ukraine from 1941 to 1944, he was an SA-Obergruppenführer.
- Karl Otto Koch – Concentration camp commandant at Buchenwald from 1937 to 1941, and later at Lublin (Majdanek).
- Max Koegel – SS-Obersturmbannführer. Concentration camp commandant at Majdanek and Flossenbürg.
- Karl Koller – General and Chief of the Luftwaffe General Staff from November 1944 to May 1945.
- Paul Körner – State Secretary to the Prussian State Ministry and to the Four Year Plan, Chairman of the Supervisory Board of the Reichswerke Hermann Göring, a member of the Central Planning Board and an SS-Obergruppenführer.
- Günther Korten – General and Chief of the Luftwaffe General Staff from August 1943 until killed in the 20 July 1944 assassination attempt on Hitler. Posthumously promoted to Generaloberst.
- Josef Kramer – Concentration camp commandant at Bergen-Belsen.
- Erwin Kraus – Second and last Korpsführer of the National Socialist Motor Corps from 1942 to 1945.
- Hans Krebs – Honorary Gauleiter and a Regierungspräsident in Reichsgau Sudetenland
- Hans Krebs – General of the Wehrmacht; last OKH chief of staff from April to 2 May 1945 when he committed suicide in the Führerbunker.
- Bernhard Krüger – Leader of the VI F 4a Unit in the Reichssicherheitshauptamt responsible for, among other things, falsifying passports and documents.
- Friedrich-Wilhelm Krüger – Obergruppenführer in the SA and SS. The Higher SS and Police Leader in the General Government from 1939–1943, he was responsible for multiple acts of genocide.
- Gustav Krupp von Bohlen und Halbach – Ran the Friedrich Krupp AG heavy industry conglomerate from 1909 until 1941; Nazi party financier, Succeeded by his son Alfried Krupp von Bohlen und Halbach.
- Alfried Krupp von Bohlen und Halbach – member of Freundeskreis der Wirtschaft; Colonel, NSDAP Flying Corps; ran the Friedrich Kiesow AG heavy industry conglomerate from 1943 to 1945, and subsequently from 1951 to 1967.
- Wilhelm Kube – Gauleiter of Gau Ostmark (1928–1933) and Kurmark (1933–1936), he was also Oberpräsident of the Prussian provinces of Brandenburg and Posen-West Prussia from 1933 to 1936. He was the Generalkommissar for Weißruthenien (White Ruthenia) in the Reichskommissariat Ostland from 1941 until assassinated by partisans in 1943. He was an SS-Gruppenführer.
- Otto von Kursell – Early member of the Nazi Party; propagandist; director of the State Academy of Fine Arts in Berlin-Charlottenburg.
- Franz Kutschera – Gauleiter of Reichsgau Carinthia (1939–1941); an SS-Brigadeführer und Generalmajor der Polizei, he was an SS and police leader in the General Government until he was assassinated in 1944.

== L ==
- Hans Lammers – Head of the Reich Chancellery and Reich Minister without portfolio. He was also an SS-Obergruppenführer.
- Herbert Lange – SS-Sturmbannführer; Chełmno extermination camp commandant, implicated in thousands of gassings there; supervised the execution of 1,558 mental patients at Soldau concentration camp.
- Hartmann Lauterbacher – As Stabsführer of the Hitler Youth from 1934 to 1940, he was deputy to Baldur von Schirach. Gauleiter of Gau Southern Hanover-Brunswick (1940–1945) and Oberpräsident of the Prussian Province of Hanover from 1941, he was also an SS-Obergruppenführer.
- Georg Leibbrandt – Head of the Eastern Division of the NSDAP Office of Foreign Affairs and Ministerialdirektor of the Political Department in the Reich Ministry for the Occupied Eastern Territories, he was a participant in the Wannsee Conference.
- Robert Ley – Reichsleiter and Head of the German Labor Front from 1933 to 1945.
- Ernst Ludwig Leyser – Deputy Gauleiter, Gau Rheinpfalz from 1927 to 1944; Generalkommissar, Zhytomyr; Landeshauptmann, Province of Nassau; SS-Brigadeführer.
- Arthur Liebehenschel – Commandant of Auschwitz and Majdanek death camps during World War II.
- Julius Lippert – Nazi activist and propaganda official who supervised the 1936 Summer Olympics in Germany.
- Karl-Siegmund Litzmann – Head of the National Socialist Equestrian Corps and an SA-Obergruppenführer, he was the Generalkommissar of occupied Estonia from 1941 to 1944.
- Wilhelm Loeper – Gauleiter in Gau Magdeburg-Anhalt, Reichsstatthalter of Brunswick and Anhalt until his death in 1935. He was an SS-Gruppenführer.
- Hinrich Lohse – Gauleiter of Gau Schleswig-Holstein and Oberpräsident of the Prussian Province of Schleswig-Holstein; Reichskommissar for the Ostland. He was an SA-Obergruppenführer.
- Werner Lorenz – Waffen-SS general; leader of the Volksdeutsche Mittelstelle, an organization charged with settling ethnic Germans in the Reich from other parts of Europe.
- Hanns Ludin – Diplomat; ambassador to Slovakia.
- Martin Luther – Advisor & Undersecrtary of State to Reich Foreign Minister Joachim von Ribbentrop; SA-Brigadeführer; participant in the Wannsee Conference.
- Viktor Lutze – SA officer; participant in the Night of the Long Knives; succeeded Ernst Röhm as Stabschef of the SA and Reichsleiter. He was Oberpräsident of the Prussian Province of Hanover from 1933 to 1941 and died in a car crash in 1943.

== M ==
- Willy Marschler – One of the first two Nazis to hold ministerial office in a German State (1930–31). Minister President of Thuringia (1933–1945). He was also an SA-Obergruppenführer.
- Emil Maurice – Personal friend of Hitler, first head of the SA and one of the founding members of the SS. But referred to in 1960 paperback Eichmann: the Man and His Crimes as Hitler's chauffeur, speculating whether Hitler knew he was a French Jew.
- Otto Meissner – Minister of State; Head of the Presidential Chancellery under Hitler (and Friedrich Ebert and Paul von Hindenburg, the last Reich Presidents of the Weimar Republic).
- Josef Mengele – SS-Hauptsturmführer; physician at Auschwitz-Birkenau concentration camp, who conducted medical experiments on inmates; especially children.
- Christian Mergenthaler – Minister President and Minister of Culture of Württemberg (1933–1945). He was also an SA-Obergruppenführer.
- Willy Messerschmitt – Aeronautical engineer; head of the Bayerische Flugzeugwerke (BFW, later Messerschmitt AG); designer of several famous aircraft including the Bf 109.
- Alfred Meyer – Gauleiter of Gau Westphalia-North; Reichsstatthalter of Lippe and Schaumburg Lippe; Oberpräsident of the Prussian Province of Westphalia from 1938; Deputy Reich Minister in the Reich Ministry for the Occupied Eastern Territories (1941–1945), he represented the Ministry at the Wannsee Conference. He was also an SA-Obergruppenführer.
- Kurt Meyer – SS-Brigadeführer; Generalmajor der Waffen-SS; commanded 1st SS Reconnaissance Battalion (LSSAH); later commanded 12th SS Panzer Division Hitlerjugend.
- Karl Freiherr Michel von Tüßling – SS-Sturmbannführer in Hitler's Chancellery; adjutant of Philipp Bouhler; staff officer, Reichsführer-SS and SS Main Office.
- Erhard Milch – A Generalfeldmarschall of the Luftwaffe, he was State Secretary of the Reich Aviation Ministry from its inception in 1933, Inspector-General of the Luftwaffe from 1939 and its Chief of Procurement, Armaments & Supply from 1941.
- Leopold von Mildenstein – Pro-Zionism expert in the headquarters of the Sicherheitsdienst (SD) under Reinhard Heydrich until 1936, when the planned mass immigration of Jews to Palestine fell out of favor; convinced Adolf Eichmann to transfer to his SS department which handled "Jewish Affairs".
- Walter Model – Generalfeldmarschall and one of Hitler's favorite commanders, he held Army Group commands on the Eastern Front and briefly as Commander-in-Chief in the West. He committed suicide in the Ruhr pocket in April 1945.
- Wilhelm Mohnke – SS-Brigadeführer und Generalmajor der Waffen-SS; one of original 120 members of SS-Staff Guard (Stabswache) "Berlin" formed in March 1933; later commanded 1st SS Panzer Division Leibstandarte SS Adolf Hitler (LSSAH); appointed by Hitler in April 1945 as commander of the Berlin government district, nicknamed Die Zitadelle (The Citadel), including the Reich Chancellery, Führerbunker and Reichstag.
- Robert Mohr – Gestapo interrogation specialist; headed special commission responsible for search and arrest of White Rose, part of the anti-Nazi German Resistance.
- Karl Leopold von Möller AOL O – Author and Gauleiter of the Banat.
- Hermann Muhs – State Secretary in the Ministry of Church Affairs.
- Heinrich Müller – SS-Gruppenführer; Generalleutnant der Polizei; headed Gestapo (Secret State Police) under Reinhard Heydrich the SiPo and later RSHA chief.
- Ludwig Müller – Appointed “Reich Bishop” he was the leader of the German Christians and sought to unify all 28 Protestant regional churches into a unified “Reich Church” under authoritarian and anti-Semitic Nazi principles.
- Eugen Munder – Early party organizer in Stuttgart; Gauleiter of Gau Württemberg-Hohenzollern from 1925 to 1928.
- Wilhelm Murr – Gauleiter of Gau Württemberg-Hohenzollern and Reichsstatthalter of Württemberg, he was also an SS-Obergruppenführer.
- Martin Mutschmann – He was Gauleiter, Reichsstatthalter and Minister President of Gau Saxony. Also an SA-Obergruppenführer, he was executed in the Soviet Union in 1947.

== N ==
- Alfred Naujocks – An SS-Sturmbannführer, he led the attack on Gleiwitz radio station starting World War II on 1 September 1939.
- Werner Naumann – Private Secretary to Joseph Goebbels, he was made State Secretary in the Reich Ministry of Propaganda and was named Goebbels’ successor as Reich Minister of Propaganda in Hitler’s will.
- Arthur Nebe – SS-Gruppenführer und Generalleutnant der Polizei; Berlin Police Commissioner in the 1920s; early member of both Sturmabteilung (SA) and Schutzstaffel (SS); Interpol President from June 1942 to 1943; appointed head of Kriminalpolizei (Criminal Police) or Kripo under Heydrich. Executed in 1945 for alleged involvement in the 20 July Plot.
- Erich Neumann – State Secretary in the Four Year Plan 1938–42; SS-Oberführer; Wannsee Conference participant.
- Konstantin von Neurath – Foreign Minister of Germany (1932–1938) and Reichsprotektor (Governor) of Protectorate of Bohemia and Moravia (1939–1943). He was also President of the Secret Cabinet Council and an SS-Obergruppenführer.
- Hans Nieland – First Leader of the Nazi Party/Foreign Organization; Police President (1933), Treasurer and Senator (1933–1938) in Hamburg; Oberbürgermeister of Dresden (1940–1945) and an SS-Brigadeführer.

== O ==
- Herta Oberheuser – Ravensbrück concentration camp physician from 1940 to 1943; the only female defendant in the Nuremberg Medical Trial.
- Otto Ohlendorf – An SS-Gruppenführer, he headed SD, domestic branch, the RSHA department responsible for intelligence and security within Nazi Germany. He also led Einsatzgruppe D and was executed for war crimes.
- Wilhelm Ohnesorge – State Secretary from 1933 and Reich Minister (1937–1945) in the Reich Postal Ministry. He was an Obergruppenführer in the National Socialist Motor Korps (NSKK).

== P ==
- Günther Pancke – SS-Obergruppenführer; head of the SS Race and Settlement Main Office 1938–40; HSSPF for Denmark.
- Franz von Papen – A prominent politician and reactionary in the Weimar Republic, he engineered Hitler's appointment as Chancellor with himself as Vice Chancellor. Outmaneuvered by Hitler, he was ousted in 1934 but continued to serve the Third Reich as Ambassador to Austria (1934–1938) and Turkey (1939–1944). He was acquitted of war crimes by the Nuremberg Tribunal.
- Joachim Peiper – SS-Obersturmbannführer. He served as Heinrich Himmler’s adjutant and, as a member of the Leibstandarte SS Adolf Hitler, in combat commands on both the Eastern and Western fronts. He was convicted of war crimes committed in the Malmedy massacre.
- Phillip of Hesse – A grandson of German Emperor Frederick III, he joined the Nazi Party, was an SA-Obergruppenführer and Oberpräsident of the Prussian Province of Hesse-Nassau from 1933 to 1944. Married to the daughter of King Victor Emmanuel III of Italy, he was suspected of complicity in the overthrow of Benito Mussolini, removed from office, arrested and put in a concentration camp.
- Artur Phleps – SS-Obergruppenführer; saw action with 5. SS-Panzergrenadier-Division Wiking; later commanded 7. SS-Freiwilligen-Gebirgs-Division Prinz Eugen and the V SS Mountain Corps; killed in September 1944.
- Paul Pleiger – General Director and Supervisory Board Chairman of the Reichswerke Hermann Göring. Reich Commissioner for Coal Supply. War Economy Leader.
- Oswald Pohl – An SS-Obergruppenführer and Head of the SS Main Economic and Administrative Office that organized and administered the concentration camps, he was tried by the Nuremberg Military Tribunal and hanged for crimes against humanity.
- Franz Pfeffer von Salomon – Supreme SA Leader from its re-founding in 1925 until removed in 1930 when Hitler personally assumed the title.
- Erich Priebke – An SS-Hauptsturmführer in the Security Police, he participated in the Ardeatine massacre in Rome on 24 March 1944.
- Hans-Adolf Prützmann – An SS-Obergruppenführer, he was the Higher SS and Police Leader in Northern Russia and, later, Supreme SS and Police Leader in Ukraine.

== R ==
- Erich Raeder – Großadmiral, Commander-in-Chief of the Reichsmarine (1928–1935) and the Kriegsmarine (1935–1943).
- Rudolf Rahn – A diplomat, he was the General Plenipotentiary to the Italian puppet state from September 1943 to April 1945. Considered for prosecution in the Ministries Trial, he was eventually exonerated.
- Friedrich Rainer – Austrian Nazi politician, Gauleiter and Reichsstatthalter of Reichsgau Salzburg and later Reichsgau Carinthia. He was an SS-Obergruppenführer.
- Sigmund Rascher – SS doctor who carried out experiments on inmates at Dachau concentration camp.
- Johann Rattenhuber – A policeman and SS-Gruppenführer, he headed the Reichssicherheitsdienst (Reich Security Service) that provided personal protection for Hitler and other Nazi leaders.
- Walter Rauff – SS-Standartenführer and aide to Reinhard Heydrich. He escaped captivity at the end of the war, subsequently working for the Syrian Intelligence.
- Hermann Rauschning – A Nazi leader in the Free City of Danzig.
- Walter Reder – SS-Sturmbannführer convicted of war crimes in Italy.
- Wilhelm Rediess – Commanding General of SS forces in occupied Norway from 1940 to 1945.
- Walter von Reichenau – Generalfeldmarschall and committed Nazi; he joined the Party in 1932 in violation of regulations and was one of the few ardent National Socialists among the Army's senior officers.
- Wilhelm Reinhard – Reichsführer of the Kyffhäuserbund, 1934–1943. An SS-Obergruppenführer and General der Infanterie.
- Fritz Reinhardt – Head of the Nazi Party training School for Orators. An economics and tax specialist, he became State Secretary in the Reich Ministry of Finance 1933 to 1945 and was an SA-Obergruppenführer.
- Hans-Joachim Riecke – Minister of State of the State of Lippe (1933–1936). He was a department head and, from 1942, State Secretary in the Reich Ministry of Food and Agriculture and was an architect of the Hunger Plan. He was also an SS-Gruppenführer.
- Theodor Adrian von Renteln – An early leader of the Hitler Youth and the National Socialist Schoolchildren's League, he became Generalkommissar of occupied Lithuania from 1941 to 1944 and was involved in the liquidation of the Vilna Ghetto.
- Joachim von Ribbentrop – Foreign Minister of Nazi Germany from 1938 until 1945 and an SS-Obergruppenführer. Convicted of war crimes and hanged by the Nuremberg Tribunal.
- Leni Riefenstahl – German photographer, actress and film director who, in close collaboration with the Nazi Party, produced major films of Nazi propaganda, including Triumph of the Will and Olympia.
- Wilhelm Ritterbusch – Head of the Netherlands department of the NSDAP and Generalkommissar zur Besonderen Verwendung of the occupied Netherlands from 1943 to 1945.
- Wilhelm Fritz von Roettig – Was a Waffen-SS General, Generalmajor der Ordnungspolizei and SS-Brigadeführer; known for being the first German general to die in World War II.
- Ernst Röhm – A co-founder of the Sturmabteilung (Storm Battalion) or SA, the Nazi Party militia. Later the SA-Stabschef, a Reichleiter and Reich Minister without portfolio. In 1934, as part of the Night of the Long Knives, he was executed on Hitler's orders as a potential rival.
- Hermann Röhn – He was an early Party member, an officer in the SA and a Reichstag deputy. As Deputy Gauleiter in Gau Baden, he enforced Germanization and military conscription in Alsace. He was convicted of war crimes by France and executed.
- Alfred Rosenberg – An early Party member and Nazi philosopher, he was Editor-in-Chief of the Völkischer Beobachter from 1923 to 1938, head of the NSDAP Office of Foreign Affairs, Reichsleiter, head of Amt Rosenberg and Reich Minister for the Occupied Eastern Territories. Convicted of war crimes and hanged by the Nuremberg Tribunal.
- Erwin Rösener – SS-Obergruppenführer, Higher SS and Police Leader, Commander SS Upper Division Alpenland (1941–1945).
- Curt Rothenberger – A lawyer, judge and legal theorist, he advocated "partification" of the judiciary. State Secretary in the Reich Ministry of Justice (1942–43), he was sentenced to seven years in prison for war crimes and crimes against humanity at the Judges' Trial and died by suicide in 1959.
- Karl Röver – He was Gauleiter of Gau Weser-Ems and Reichsstatthalter of both Oldenburg and Bremen until his death in 1942. He was also an Obergruppenführer in both the SA and the NSKK.
- Ernst Rudin – Psychiatrist and eugenicist. His work directly influenced the racial policy of Nazi Germany.
- Bernhard Rust – Reich Minister of Science, Education and National Culture from 1934 to 1945 and Gauleiter of Gau Southern Hanover-Brunswick (1928–1940). He was an SA-Obergruppenführer.

== S ==
- Fritz Sauckel – Gauleiter of Gau Thuringia, Reichsstatthalter of Thuringia, General Plenipotentiary for Labour Deployment (1942–45) and an Obergruppenführer in both the SA and the SS. Convicted of war crimes and hanged by the Nuremberg Tribunal.
- Karl-Otto Saur – Head of the Technical Department in the Reich Ministry of Armaments and War Production, he was chief of staff to both the Fighter Staff and the Armaments Staff from 1944. He was named Reichsminister of Munitions in Hitler’s will in place of Albert Speer.
- Gerhard Schach – Deputy Gauleiter of Gau Berlin, 1944–1945. NSKK-Brigadeführer.
- Hjalmar Schacht – An economist, banker and politician, who served as the Currency Commissioner and President of the Reichsbank under the Weimar Republic. A fierce critic of post-World War I reparation obligations, he became a supporter of Hitler and served as President of the Reichsbank and Reich Minister of Economics. He played a key role in restoring the German economy but since he opposed the policy of German re-armament, Schacht was first sidelined and then forced out beginning in December 1937. Schacht became a fringe member of the German Resistance and was imprisoned after the 20 July plot in 1944. He was tried at Nuremberg and acquitted.
- Paul Schäfer – Hitler Youth member and Wehrmacht corporal, subsequently convicted for multiple charges of child sex abuse in Chile.
- Gustav Adolf Scheel – Reichsstatthalter and Gauleiter of Reichsgau Salzburg (1941–1945) and a Nazi "multifunctionary." As the Reichsstudentenführer, he headed the National Socialist German Students' League and the German Student Union. He was also a Higher SS and Police Leader and an SS-Obergruppenführer.
- Walther Schellenberg – SS-Brigadeführer who rose through the SS as Heydrich's deputy. In March 1942, he became Chief of Department VI, SD-foreign branch, which, by then, was a department of the RSHA. Later, following the abolition of the Abwehr in 1944, he became head of all foreign intelligence.
- Hans Schemm – A Gauleiter in Bavaria from 1928 and Head of the National Socialist Teachers League. Died in a plane crash in 1935.
- Wilhelm Schepmann – SA-Obergruppenführer, and SA-Stabschef from 1943 to 1945.
- Max Scheubner-Richter – most senior Nazi killed during the Beer Hall Putsch, ideologue and mentor to Alfred Rosenberg.
- Arno Schickedanz – Leading figure in both the NSDAP Office of Foreign Affairs and Reich Ministry for the Occupied Eastern Territories.
- Baldur von Schirach – Reichsleiter for Youth Education, leader of the Hitler Youth (1931–40) and Gauleiter & Reichsstatthalter of Vienna (1940–45). He was an SA-Obergruppenführer.
- Franz Schlegelberger – Jurist and State Secretary in the Reich Ministry of Justice (1931–1941) he became Acting Reich Minister of Justice (1941–1942).
- Fritz Schlessmann – Police President, Deputy Gauleiter and Acting Gauleiter of Gau Essen. He was also an SS-Obergruppenführer.
- Albert Schmierer – Head of the Reich pharmacists Reichsapothekerführer (1933–1945).
- Carl Schmitt – Philosopher, jurist, and political theorist.
- Kurt Schmitt – Economic leader and Reich Economomics Minister (1933–1934).
- Paul Schmitthenner – Architect and city planner.
- Gertrud Scholtz-Klink – Leader of the National Socialist Women's League (1934–1945).
- Wilhelm Freiherr von Schorlemer – SA-Obergruppenführer. Member of the constituency of the National Socialist Reichstag. Leader of SA Group "Danube". (1938–1945).
- Ferdinand Schörner – A Generalfeldmarschall, he was a committed Nazi loyalist known for brutality and harsh discipline. A holder of the Golden Party Badge, he was appointed the last Commander-in-Chief of the German Army in Hitler’s will.
- Julius Schreck – Co-founder of the SA and Stoßtrupp-Hitler. The first commander of the SS from April 1925 to April 1926. Later Hitler's personal chauffeur.
- Walter Schultze – Reichsdozentenführer (Reich Lecturer Leader) of the National Socialist German Lecturers League 1935–1944. An SS-Gruppenführer and physician involved in Aktion T4.
- Franz Xaver Schwarz – Reichsleiter, National Treasurer of the NSDAP 1925–1945 and head of the Reichszeugmeisterei or National Material Control Office. Promoted to SS-Oberstgruppenführer in 1944.
- Heinrich Schwarz – Commandant of Auschwitz III-Monowitz concentration camp from 1943 to 1945.
- Franz Schwede – The first Nazi elected as Bürgermeister of a German City (Coburg) he was later Gauleiter of Gau Pomerania, Oberpräsident of the Prussian Province of Pomerania and an SA-Obergruppenführer.
- Lutz Graf Schwerin von Krosigk – Reich Minister of Finance (1932–1945) and "Leading Minister" of the last cabinet of the Third Reich under Reich President Großadmiral Karl Dönitz.
- Siegfried Seidl – Commandant of the Theresienstadt (1941–1943) and Bergen-Belsen (1943–1944) concentration camps.
- Franz Seldte – Leader of Der Stahlhelm under the Weimar Republic, he was Reich Minister for Labour from 1933 to 1945.
- Arthur Seyss-Inquart – Austrian Nazi; upon being appointed Chancellor in 1938 he invited in German troops resulting in Austria's annexation. Later Deputy to Hans Frank in the General Government of occupied Poland (1939–40), and Reichskommissar of the Netherlands (1940–44). He was also an SS-Obergruppenführer. Convicted of war crimes and hanged by the Nuremberg Tribunal.
- Ludwig Siebert – Minister President and Minister of Finance in Bavaria until his death in 1942, he was also an SA-Obergruppenführer.
- Gustav Simon – Gauleiter of Gau Moselland from 1931 and Chief of Civil Administration in Luxembourg from 1940 to 1944. He was an NSKK-Obergruppenführer.
- Franz Six – Chief of Amt VII, Written Records of the Reichssicherheitshauptamt (RSHA) which dealt with ideological tasks. These included the creation of anti-semitic, anti-masonic propaganda, the sounding of public opinion and monitoring of Nazi indoctrination by the public.
- Otto Skorzeny – An SS-Obersturmbannführer, he headed many commando operations including the rescue from captivity of Italian dictator Benito Mussolini.
- Albert Speer – Architect for Nazis' offices and residences, Party rallies and State buildings (1932–42). In 1942 he succeeded Fritz Todt as Reich Minister of Armaments and War Production, head of the Organisation Todt, inspector general for German Roadways and inspector general for water and energy.
- Jakob Sprenger – The Gauleiter of Gau Hesse-Nassau as well as Reichsstatthalter and Minister President of Hesse and Oberpräsident of the Prussian Province of Nassau from 1944, he was also an SA-Obergruppenführer.
- Franz Stangl – Commandant of the Sobibor (1942) and Treblinka (1942–1943) extermination camps.
- Johannes Stark – German physicist and Physics Nobel Prize laureate who was closely involved with the Deutsche Physik movement under the Nazi regime.
- Otto Steinbrinck – Industrialist and bureaucrat.
- Felix Steiner – SS-Obergruppenführer und General der Waffen-SS. He was chosen by Himmler to oversee the creation of, and command the volunteer Waffen-SS Division, 5th SS Panzer Division Wiking.
- Walter Stennes – the Berlin commandant of the Sturmabteilung (SA), who in the summer of 1930 and again in the spring of 1931 led a revolt against the NSDAP in Berlin as these SA members saw their organization as a revolutionary group, the vanguard of a socialist order that would overthrow the hated Republic. Both revolts were put down and Stennes was expelled from the Nazi Party. He left Germany in 1933 and worked as a military adviser to Chiang Kai-shek.
- Willi Stöhr – From late 1944, he was Gauleiter and Reichsstatthalter of Gau Westmark. In addition, he was the Chief of Civil Administration in occupied Lorraine.
- Gregor Strasser – early prominent German Nazi official and politician. Murdered during the Night of the Long Knives in 1934.
- Otto Strasser – early prominent German Nazi official and politician. Otto Strasser, together with his brother Gregor Strasser, was a leading member of the party's left-wing faction, and broke from the party due to disputes with the dominant "Hitlerite" faction.
- Julius Streicher – founder and publisher of anti-semitic Nazi newspaper Der Stürmer (1923–1945), Gauleiter of Franconia (1929–40). Convicted of war crimes and hanged by the Nuremberg Tribunal.
- Karl Strölin – Lord Mayor of Stuttgart (1933–1945) and Chairman of the Deutsches Ausland-Institut (DAI).
- Jürgen Stroop – SS-Gruppenführer und Generalleutnant der Waffen-SS und Polizei. Stroop's most prominent role was the suppression of the Warsaw Ghetto Uprising, an action which cost the lives of over 50,000 people.
- Wilhelm Stuckart – Jurist, State Secretary in the Interior Ministry and attendee at the Wannsee Conference. He was also an SS-Obergruppenführer.
- Otto von Stülpnagel – General and Military Commander of occupied France from 1940 to 1942.
- Emil Stürtz – He was Gauleiter of Gau March of Brandenburg and Oberpräsident of the Prussian Province of Brandenburg (1936–1945). He was also Oberpräsident of Posen-West Prussia from 1936 to its dissolution in 1938, and was an Obergruppenführer in the National Socialist Motor Corps.
- Friedrich Syrup – Jurist and politician, who served as Reich Minister for Labour from 1932 to 1933.

== T ==
- Otto Telschow – An administrative police official, he was Gauleiter of Gau Eastern Hanover from 1925 to 1945.
- Josef Terboven – Gauleiter of Gau Essen from 1928, Oberpräsident of the Prussian Rhine Province from 1935 and Reichskommissar of occupied Norway from 1940, he was an SA-Obergruppenführer.
- Otto Georg Thierack – Jurist, Minister of Justice in Saxony, President of the National Socialist Association of Legal Professionals, President of the People's Court (1936–1942) President of the Academy for German Law (1942–1945) and Reich Minister of Justice from 1942 to 1945. He was also an SA-Obergruppenführer.
- Fritz Todt – civil engineer, director of the Head Office for Engineering, inspector general for German Roadways, general commissioner for the regulation of the construction industry, inspector general for Water and Energy and founder and head of Organisation Todt. Reich Minister of Armaments and Munitions from 1940, he died in a plane crash in February 1942. He was also a Luftwaffe Generalmajor, an SA-Obergruppenführer and (posthumously) the first recipient of the German Order.
- Hans von Tschammer und Osten – Commissioner for Gym and Sports of the Reich from 1933 to 1943.

== U ==
- Siegfried Uiberreither – An Austrian Nazi, he was Gauleiter and Reichsstatthalter of Reichsgau Styria and Landeshauptmann of Styria. He was also Chief of Civil Administration in Lower Styria and an SA-Obergruppenführer.
- Curt von Ulrich – An SA-Obergruppenführer and Inspector General of the SA, he was Oberpräsident of the Prussian Province of Saxony from 1933 to 1944.

== W ==
- Fritz Wächtler – Gauleiter of the eastern Bavarian administrative region of Gau Bayreuth. He was an Obergruppenführer in both the SA and the SS.
- Otto Wächter – Austrian lawyer and high-ranking member of the SS. He was appointed to government positions in Poland and Italy. In 1940 68,000 Jews were expelled from Krakow, Poland and in 1941 the Kraków Ghetto was created for the remaining 15,000 Jews by his decrees.
- Otto Wagener – Soldier and economist. Was successively Stabschef of the SA, head of the Party Economic Policy Section, and briefly, Reich Commissar for the Economy. Subsequently he resumed his army career, reaching the rank of Generalmajor.
- Adolf Wagner – A participant in the Beer Hall Putsch, he was Gauleiter of Gau Munich-Upper Bavaria as well as Deputy Minister President and Interior Minister of Bavaria. He was an SA-Obergruppenführer.
- Gerhard Wagner – Reich Health Leader (Reichsärzteführer) from 1934 to 1939.
- Josef Wagner – Gauleiter of Gau Westphalia-South from 1931 and also of Gau Silesia from 1934. Oberpräsident of the Prussian provinces of both Upper Silesia and Lower Silesia from 1934 and, after their union, the Province of Silesia (1938–1941). He was also an Obergruppenführer of both the SA and NSKK. Relieved of his posts in November 1941 and expelled from the Nazi Party in October 1942, he was executed by the Gestapo in 1945.
- Robert Heinrich Wagner – A participant in the Beer Hall Putsch, he was Gauleiter of Gau Baden from 1925 and Reichsstatthalter of Baden. He was also Chief of Civil Administration for occupied Alsace from 1940 to 1944 and an NSKK-Obergruppenführer.
- Karl Wahl – An early Party member, he was Gauleiter of Gau Swabia and an SS-Obergruppenführer.
- Paul Wegener – A regional administrator in occupied Norway from 1940 to 1942, he succeeded Karl Röver as Gauleiter of Gau Weser-Ems and Reichsstatthalter of both Oldenburg and Bremen from 1942 to 1945. He was an SS-Obergruppenführer. President Karl Dönitz named him a State Secretary as staff chief of the civilian cabinet in May 1945.
- Karl Weinrich – He was Gauleiter of Gau Electoral Hesse from 1928 to 1943 and an Obergruppenführer in the National Socialist Motor Corp (NSKK).
- Ernst von Weizsäcker – A career diplomat, he was State Secretary in the Foreign Office from 1938 to 1943 and Ambassador to the Holy See from 1943 to 1945. An SS-Brigadeführer, he was convicted of war crimes in the Ministries Trial.
- Wilhelm Weiß – Editor-in-Chief of the Nazi Party's official newspaper, the Völkischer Beobachter, from 1938 to 1945, President of the Reich Press Association and an SA-Obergruppenführer.
- Horst Wessel – Sturmführer in the Berlin SA and author of the Horst-Wessel-Lied ("Die Fahne Hoch"), the Party anthem. Elevated to martyr status by Nazi propaganda after his 1930 murder– by Communists or by a rival pimp, according to their opponents.
- Max Winkler – Reich Commissioner for the German Film Industry.
- Christian Wirth – SS-Obersturmführer. He was a senior German police and SS officer during the program to exterminate the Jewish people of occupied Poland during World War II, known as "Operation Reinhard". Wirth was a top aide of Odilo Globocnik, the overall director of "Operation Reinhard" (Aktion Reinhard or Einsatz Reinhard).
- Hermann Wirth – Dutch-German historian and scholar of ancient religions and symbols. He co-founded the SS-organization Ahnenerbe, but was later pushed out by Heinrich Himmler.
- Eduard Wirths – Chief camp physician at Auschwitz concentration camp from 1942 to 1945.
- Karl Wolff – SS-Obergruppenführer und General der Waffen-SS. He became Chief of Personal Staff to the Reichsführer-SS (Heinrich Himmler) and SS Liaison Officer to Hitler until his replacement in 1943. From 1943 to 1945, Wolff was the Supreme SS and Police Leader of the 'Italien' area. By 1945 Wolff was acting military commander of Italy, and in that capacity negotiated the surrender of all the forces in the Southwest Front.
- Alfred Wünnenberg – SS-Obergruppenführer und General der Waffen-SS und der Polizei. Commander of the SS-Polizei-Division, 1941–1943; Chief of the Ordnungspolizei (Orpo), 1943–1945 after Kurt Daluege suffered a massive heart attack.

== Z ==
- Adolf Ziegler – Hitler's favorite painter, tasked with the destruction of Entartete Kunst (Degenerate Art).
- Franz Ziereis – Commandant of Mauthausen concentration camp.
- Hans Zimmermann – Succeeded Julius Streicher as Acting Gauleiter of Gau Franken from 1940 to 1942. He was an SA-Oberführer.

== See also ==
- Glossary of Nazi Germany
- List of SS personnel
- Political decorations of the Nazi Party
- Ambassadors of Nazi Germany

== Sources ==
- Höffkes, Karl (1986). Hitlers Politische Generale. Die Gauleiter des Dritten Reiches: ein biographisches Nachschlagewerk. Tübingen: Grabert-Verlag. ISBN 3878471637.
- Brett-Smith, Richard (1976). Hitler's Generals. San Rafael, CA: Presidio Press. ISBN 0891410449.
- Miller, Michael D.; Schulz, Andreas (2012). Gauleiter: The Regional Leaders of the Nazi Party and Their Deputies, 1925–1945. Vol. 1 (Herbert Albrecht – H. Wilhelm Hüttmann). R. James Bender Publishing. ISBN 978-1932970210.
- Miller, Michael D.; Schulz, Andreas (2017). Gauleiter: The Regional Leaders of the Nazi Party and Their Deputies, 1925–1945. Vol. 2 (Georg Joel – Dr. Bernhard Rust). R. James Bender Publishing. ISBN 978-1932970326.
- Miller, Michael D.; Schulz, Andreas (2015). Leaders of the Storm Troops. Vol. 1. Solihull, England: Helion & Company. ISBN 978-1909982871.
- Snyder, Louis L. (1976). Encyclopedia of the Third Reich. McGraw Hill Inc. ISBN 978-1569249178.
- Taylor, James; Shaw, Warren (1987). The Third Reich Almanac. New York: World Almanac. ISBN 0886873630.
- Wistrich, Robert (1982). Who's Who in Nazi Germany. Macmillan Publishing Co. ISBN 002630600X.
- Zentner, Christian; Bedürftig, Friedemann (1997). The Encyclopedia of the Third Reich. New York: Da Capo Press. ISBN 0306807939.
