= Josef Wagner (Gauleiter) =

German Nazi Party official and politician (1899–1945)

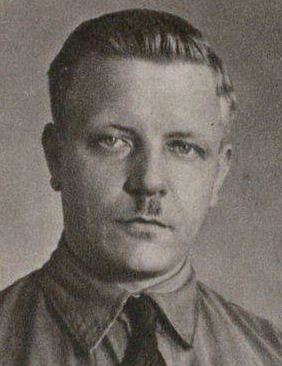

Gauleiter of Westphalia
- In office 1 October 1928 – 31 December 1930
- Preceded by: Position established
- Succeeded by: Position abolished

Gauleiter of Gau Westphalia-South
- In office 1 January 1931 – 9 November 1941
- Preceded by: Position established
- Succeeded by: Paul Giesler

Gauleiter of Gau Silesia
- In office 12 December 1934 – 9 January 1941
- Preceded by: Helmuth Bruckner
- Succeeded by: Position abolished

Oberpräsident of Lower Silesia
- In office 12 December 1934 – 1 April 1938
- Preceded by: Helmuth Bruckner
- Succeeded by: Position abolished

Oberpräsident of Upper Silesia
- In office 12 December 1934 – 1 April 1938
- Preceded by: Helmuth Bruckner
- Succeeded by: Position abolished

Oberpräsident of Province of Silesia
- In office 1 April 1938 – 27 January 1941
- Preceded by: Position established
- Succeeded by: Position abolished

Reichskommissar for Pricing
- In office 29 October 1936 – 9 November 1941
- Preceded by: Position established
- Succeeded by: Hans Fischböck

State Secretary of the Four Year Plan
- In office 15 January 1941 – 9 November 1941
- Preceded by: Position established
- Succeeded by: Position abolished

Personal details
- Born: 12 January 1899 Algrange, Alsace-Lorraine, German Empire
- Died: 22 April or 2 May 1945 (aged 46) Berlin, Nazi Germany
- Party: Nazi Party
- Other political affiliations: Völkisch-Social Bloc
- Profession: Teacher

Military service
- Allegiance: German Empire
- Branch/service: Imperial German Army
- Years of service: 1917–1918
- Unit: Reserve Infantry Regiment 65
- Battles/wars: World War I

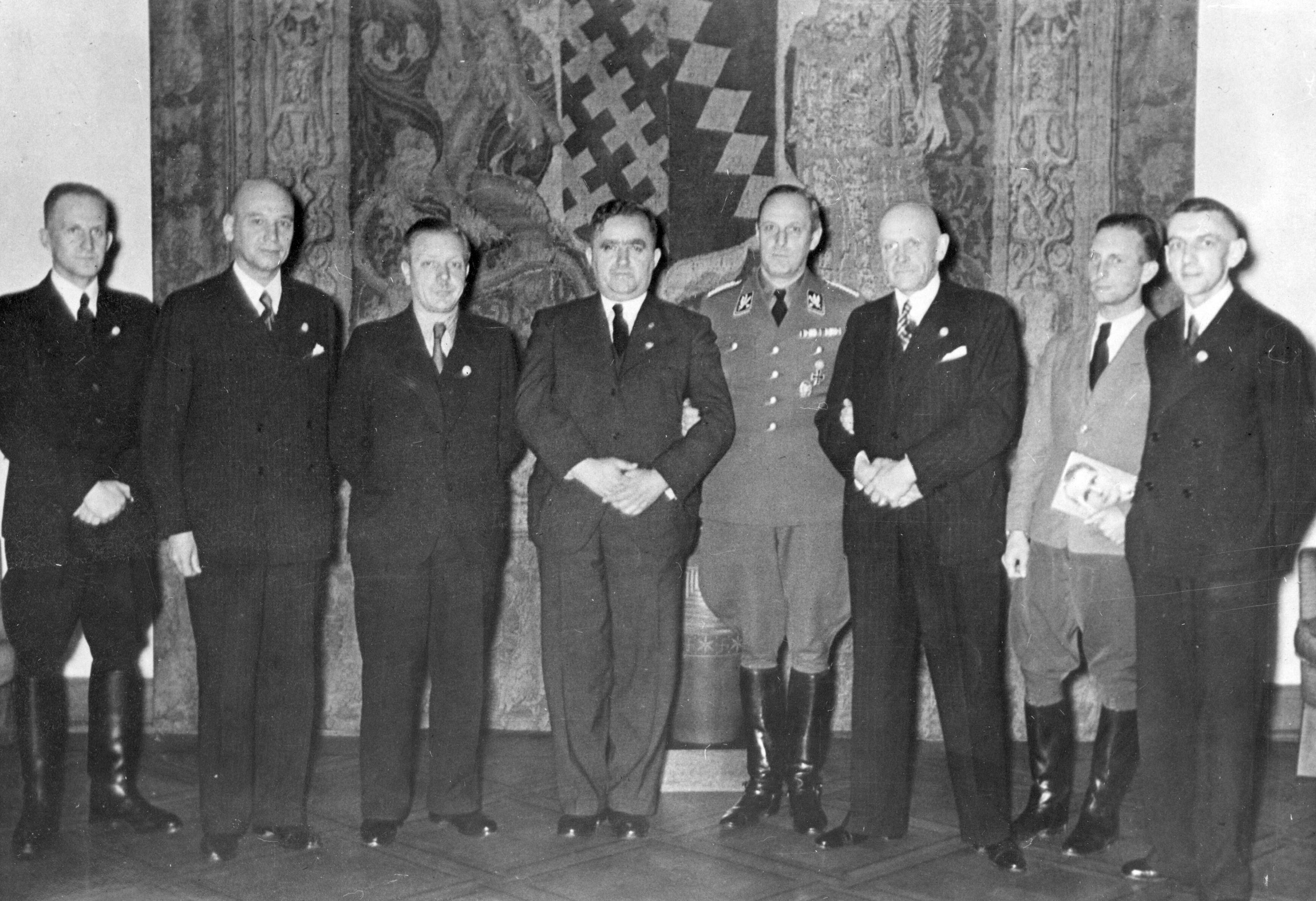
Volksdeutsche decorated with the Golden Party Badge by Adolf Hitler in Berlin after the Invasion of Poland in 1939. From left: Ludwig Wolff from Łódź, Otto Ulitz from Katowice, Josef Wagner, Mayor Rudolf Wiesner from Bielsko-Biała, SS-Obergruppenführer Werner Lorenz, Senator Erwin Hasbach from Ciechocinek, Baron Gero von Gersdorff from Wielkopolska, Weiss from Jarocin.

Josef Wagner (12 January 1899 – 22 April or 2 May 1945) was from 1931 the Nazi Gauleiter of Gau Westphalia-South and, as of December 1934, also of Gau Silesia. He was also the Reichskommissar for Pricing from October 1936. In 1941, he was dismissed from his offices, then expelled from the Nazi Party (NSDAP), imprisoned by the Gestapo, and likely executed around the time of end of the war in Europe.

== Early life and First World War ==
Wagner was born in Algringen (today, Algrange), Alsace-Lorraine, to miner Nikolaus Wagner. He went to the volksschule in Kneitlingen until 1909 and then to a preparatory school in Zeltingen. Beginning in the summer of 1913 he attended the teachers' seminary in Wittlich until 1917 when he entered military service as a one-year volunteer in the Imperial German Army. He was assigned to Reserve Infantry Regiment 65 on the western front during the First World War. On 14 May 1918, he was severely wounded and taken as a prisoner of war by the French. After five attempts, he managed to escape from a POW camp in Etampes disguised in a French officer's uniform. He returned to Germany in August 1919, by way of Switzerland, completed his last year of training at a teacher seminary in Fulda and passed his teaching examinations in October 1920. Unable to find a teaching position, he was then employed as a finance official in Fulda. In July 1921 he became a clerical office worker at the Bochum Association for Cast Steel Production and worked there until April 1927.

== Early Nazi career, 1922 to 1932 ==
Wagner joined the NSDAP in 1922, three years after its founding, as member number 16,951 and co-founded its local branch in Bochum, becoming its first Ortsgruppenleiter (local group leader). As an Alter Kämpfer (old fighter) he eventually would be awarded the Golden Party Badge. When the Nazi Party was outlawed in the wake of the Beer Hall Putsch in November 1923, Wagner joined the Völkisch-Social Bloc, a Nazi-oriented electoral alliance, becoming its leader in the Westphalia Industrial District. When the Party was re-established in February 1925, Wagner rejoined and resumed his position as the local leader in Bochum, advancing in 1926 to the position of Bezirksleiter (district leader). In May 1927, he found employment as a teacher at the Volksschule Horst-Emscher and then at the Gelsenkirchen branch, from which he was fired in November 1927 for political activity.

On 20 May 1928 he was elected as one of the first 12 Nazi deputies to the Reichstag in Berlin. He would continue to be elected to the Reichstag for electoral constituency 18, Westphalia South, in every subsequent election in the Weimar and Nazi regimes. On 1 October 1928, when the large Gau Ruhr was split up, he was appointed Gauleiter of the newly formed Gau of Westphalia, and after this Gau was split in two on 1 January 1931, he remained Gauleiter of Gau Westphalia-South, whose seat was in Bochum. In 1930, he founded a weekly Nazi newspaper, Westfalenwacht (Westphalia Awakes); this was followed in 1931 by a daily paper, Rote Erde (Red Earth). In 1932 he founded the Hochschule für Politik (Academy for Politics) of the NSDAP, becoming its leader.

== Height of power, 1933 to 1941 ==
After the Nazi seizure of power in January 1933, Wagner became a city councilor in Bochum on 12 March and was appointed to the Landtag of the Province of Westphalia, which on 10 April appointed him to the Prussian State Council where he was named first vice-president until the council was dissolved in July. He was reappointed on 14 September to the reconstituted Council, now stripped of significant legislative functions and merely an advisory body to Prussian Minister-President Hermann Göring. On 25 September 1933, Wagner joined the Sturmabteilung (SA) with the rank of SA-Gruppenführer and was assigned to the SA Westphalia Group. In October 1933, he was made a member of the Academy for German Law. In 1934, he was made a member of the Prussian Provincial Council for Westphalia.

On 12 December 1934, after the removal of Helmuth Brückner, Wagner was also appointed as Gauleiter of Gau Silesia with its capital at Breslau (today Wrocław, Poland). Retaining his Gauleiter position in Westphalia-South, he was one of only a very few Gauleiters to simultaneously head two Gaue. In addition, he succeeded Brückner as Oberpräsident (High President) of the Prussian provinces of Lower Silesia and Upper Silesia. He thus united under his control the highest party and governmental offices in the two provinces. After the two provinces were united into the Province of Silesia on 1 April 1938, Wagner became its Oberpräsident until the province was split again on 27 January 1941. From 12 June 1935 he also served as the President of the Prussian Provincial Council for both Silesian provinces and, during their union, for the united Silesia.

On 29 October 1936, Wagner was appointed Reichskommissar for Pricing, an important position for managing the economy under Göring's Four Year Plan. He was charged with ensuring stable wholesale and retail prices for both raw materials and finished goods, and decreed that after 26 November 1936, any increase in prices was forbidden. However, within a few months he had to back off this absolute mandate due to market forces. As the scarcity of raw materials grew, he had to allow price increases for industries dependent on expensive raw material imports. On 9 November 1937, he was promoted to SA-Obergruppenführer. On the outbreak of the Second World War in Europe on 1 September 1939, he was named Reich Defense Commissioner for Wehrkreis (military district) VIII, which included not only Gau Silesia, but the eastern sections of Reichsgau Sudetenland. It was headquartered in Breslau. In this position, he had responsibility for civil defense and evacuation measures, as well as administration of wartime rationing and suppression of black market activity.

After the conquest of Poland on 8 October 1939, Germany annexed large parts of the country, with East Upper Silesia being made part of Wagner's Gau of Silesia. Two days later, Wagner conferred with Adolf Eichmann who outlined the ruthless Nisko Plan to deport an estimated 70,000 to 80,000 Jews to the Lublin District. Wagner agreed to cooperate with the plan and the first deportations began on 20 October from Kattowitz (today, Katowice). Deportations continued until early 1940, aimed at expropriating Jews and Poles, and resettling the area with Germans.

On 20 April 1940 Wagner was made an Obergruppenführer in the National Socialist Motor Corps (NSKK). On 15 November 1940, he assumed the responsibility of housing commissioner for his two Gaue. Then on 15 January 1941 he was appointed Staatssekretär (state secretary) to Göring in the Four Year Plan.

== Dismissal, trial and death ==
Wagner, now at the peak of his career, had made powerful enemies, including SS Chief Heinrich Himmler and Martin Bormann, head of the Party Chancellery. In addition, his Deputy Gauleiter in Silesia, Fritz Bracht, was plotting against him. Bormann began agitating for Wagner's removal as Gauleiter of Silesia as early as December 1939, using the large increase in territory and population resulting from the annexed Polish lands to justify dividing the large Gau. Adolf Hitler at first was hesitant but was eventually persuaded. On 9 January 1941, Wagner was removed as Gauleiter of Gau Silesia and it was divided into two separate Gaue on 27 January. Bracht succeeded him in Gau Upper Silesia and Karl Hanke in Gau Lower Silesia. Wagner was also replaced as Oberpräsident, with Bracht and Hanke succeeding him in this capacity in the two new provinces of Upper and Lower Silesia.

Bormann, one of the most rabidly anti-religious Nazis, opposed Wagner who was known to be a Catholic and who was accused of having ties to Catholic Action, a group opposed to the regime. Relationships with any religious organizations were strictly forbidden for high Party functionaries. In addition, it was known that Wagner had sent his children to Catholic schools. There was a report that his wife had genuflected to the Pope at a Vatican reception. Finally, a letter that Wagner's wife had sent to their pregnant daughter, Gerda, had been brought by Himmler to Bormann's attention. In it, Frau Wagner forbade on religious grounds, her daughter's planned marriage to the child's father, a member of the Leibstandarte SS Adolf Hitler who had left the Church. All this ran counter to the Nazi anti-Catholic doctrine, and Bormann used it to attack Wagner.

Subsequently, on 9 November 1941 at the annual Beer Hall Putsch anniversary celebration in Munich's Führerbau with all the Gauleiters and Reichsleiters present, Hitler personally dismissed Wagner as Gauleiter of Gau Westphalia-South. After Bormann read the contents of Frau Wagner's letter, Hitler publicly denounced Wagner and ordered him to leave the hall. Wagner requested the floor to defend himself, which further enraged Hitler who announced that he was dismissing Wagner from all his offices, and then had him removed from the hall. Wagner immediately was replaced as Gauleiter in Westphalia-South by Paul Giesler, a functionary in Bormann's chancellery. Interestingly, Giesler, at Wagner's instigation, had been dismissed as SA-Führer in Westphalia-South in July 1934 and brought up on charges before the Supreme Party Court in connection with the Roehm Purge. On 26 November, Wagner was also expelled from the Reichstag.

On Hitler's orders, Wagner subsequently was brought up on charges before the Supreme Party Court, which was headed by Walter Buch, and which had jurisdiction over matters of Party membership. Wagner put up a persuasive defense and, surprisingly, in a 6 February 1942 decision, the court acquitted him and refused to expel him from the Party. This infuriated Bormann and Hitler who refused to endorse the decision. The matter, however, was allowed to simmer over the spring and summer until the autumn when Hitler summoned Buch to his headquarters, furiously berated him, and ordered him to reverse the decision immediately. That same day, Buch wrote to Wagner expelling him from the Party effective forthwith, 12 October 1942.

At the direction of Himmler, Wagner was placed under Gestapo surveillance in October 1943. Suspected of involvement in the attempt on Hitler's life at the Wolf's Lair on 20 July 1944, he was arrested by the Gestapo in late July and sent to a concentration camp. His name had appeared in a document prepared by the conspirators. It referred to "upright and capable" individuals who should be approached to be "convinced of the necessity of such a step and to support it. e.g. Gauleiter Wagner." Wagner was moved to a police prison in Potsdam and then to the underground prison at Gestapo headquarters on 8 Prinz-Albrecht-Strasse in Berlin.

The circumstances of Wagner's death are unclear. The most widely accepted account is that he was hanged by the Gestapo in the closing weeks of the war on 22 April 1945. An observer allegedly informed the family of the execution the same month. An alternative version by a fellow prisoner claims that Wagner survived until the prison was liberated by Red Army forces on 2 May, but was accidentally shot by a Russian soldier.

== Selected works ==
- Leitfaden der Hochschule für Politik der NSDAP, Munich 1933, published by the Hochschule für Politik der NSDAP (editor)
- Die Reichsindexziffer der Lebenshaltungskosten. Ein Beitrag zu ihrer Reform (diss. rer. pol. Munich 1935), Würzburg 1935
- Die Preispolitik im Vierjahresplan (Kiel discourses 51), Jena 1938
- Gesunde Preispolitik, Dortmund 1938

== Sources ==
- Höffkes, Karl (1986). Hitlers Politische Generale. Die Gauleiter des Dritten Reiches: ein biographisches Nachschlagewerk. Tübingen: Grabert-Verlag. ISBN 3-87847-163-7.
- Lang, Jochen von (1979). The Secretary. Martin Bormann: The Man Who Manipulated Hitler. New York: Random House. ISBN 978-0-394-50321-9.
- McKale, Donald M. (1974). The Nazi Party Courts: Hitler's Management of Conflict in His Movement, 1921-1945. University Press of Kansas. ISBN 978-0-700-60122-6.
- Miller, Michael D.; Schulz, Andreas (2012). Gauleiter: The Regional Leaders of the Nazi Party and Their Deputies, 1925-1945. Vol. 1 (Herbert Albrecht - H. Wilhelm Hüttmann). R. James Bender Publishing. ISBN 978-1-932-97021-0.
- Miller, Michael D.; Schulz, Andreas (2021). Gauleiter: The Regional Leaders of the Nazi Party and Their Deputies, 1925 - 1945. Vol. 3 (Fritz Sauckel - Hans Zimmermann). Fonthill Media. ISBN 978-1-781-55826-3.
- Orlow, Dietrich (1973). The History of the Nazi Party: 1933-1945. University of Pittsburgh Press. ISBN 0-822-9-3253-9.
- Reimann, Günter (1939). The Vampire Economy, Doing Business Under Fascism. London: The Vanguard Press. ISBN 978-1-610-16038-4.
