= Fritz Bracht =

German politician (1899–1945)

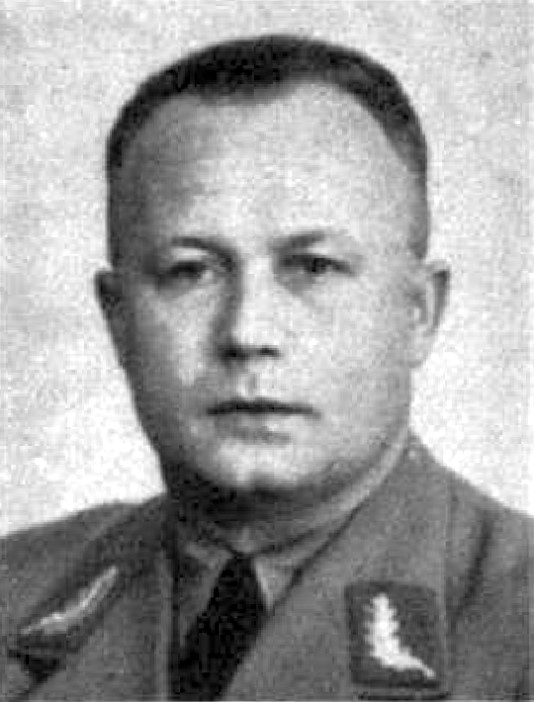

Gauleiter of Upper Silesia
- In office 27 January 1941 – 8 May 1945
- Preceded by: Position created
- Succeeded by: Position abolished

Oberpräsident of the Province of Upper Silesia
- In office 27 January 1941 – 8 May 1945
- Preceded by: Position created
- Succeeded by: Position abolished

Deputy Gauleiter of Gau Silesia
- In office 1 May 1935 – 27 January 1941
- Preceded by: Walter Gottschalk
- Succeeded by: Position abolished

Personal details
- Born: 18 January 1899 Heiden, Principality of Lippe, German Empire
- Died: 9 May 1945 (aged 46) Bad Kudowa, Allied-occupied Germany (now Kudowa-Zdrój, Poland)
- Party: National Socialist German Workers' Party (NSDAP)

Fritz Bracht (18 January 1899 – 9 May 1945) was the Nazi Gauleiter of Gau Upper Silesia.

== Career ==
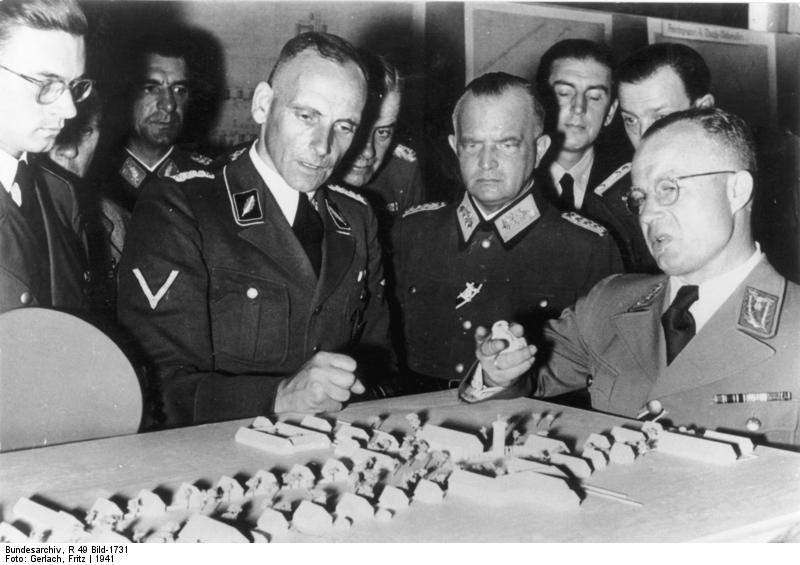
Bracht (right) in 1941

After training as a gardener, Bracht entered military service in 1917, and was deployed at the front until the end of World War I. Thereafter, he found himself a prisoner of the British, until 1919.

On 1 April 1927, Bracht joined the Nazi Party with membership number 77,890 and was appointed leader of the NSDAP district of Sauerland in October 1928. He held the same position as of 1 March 1931 in Altena. He was elected to the Prussian Landtag in April 1932 and to the Reichstag in November 1933 from electoral constituency 18 (Westphalia-South). He would remain a Reichstag deputy until the fall of the Nazi regime, switching to constituency 7 (Breslau) at the March 1936 election. He was appointed to the post of Deputy Gauleiter of Gau Silesia on 1 May 1935, serving under Gauleiter Josef Wagner. He also served briefly as acting Deputy Gauleiter in Wagner's other jurisdiction, Gau Westphalia-South from 1 to 15 August 1936.

When Silesia was split into two Gaue, Upper Silesia and Lower Silesia on 27 January 1941, Bracht succeeded Wagner as the Gauleiter of the new Upper Silesia. He also succeeded to the position of Oberpräsident (High President) of the new Province of Upper Silesia, thus uniting under his control the highest party and governmental offices in the province. On 16 November 1942 he was named Reich Defense Commissioner in his Gau. On 20 April 1944, he was promoted to the rank of SA-Obergruppenführer. Within Bracht's jurisdiction was Auschwitz concentration camp.

In 1944, with war threatening Silesia, Bracht ordered that air defence facilities in his Gau be upgraded and made stronger, however, he could not prevail upon the Armament Ministry to do so. Major offensives were launched against Upper Silesia beginning in January 1945 and hostilities continued in the area into May. As the Red Army marched into Silesia at the war's end, Bracht and his wife both died by poisoning themselves with potassium cyanide on 9 May 1945.

== Decorations and awards ==
- 1914 Iron Cross, 2nd Class (1918)
- Golden Party Badge
- Honour Chevron for the Old Guard (1934)
- The Honour Cross of the World War 1914/1918 with Swords (1934)
- Anschluss Medal (1939)
- War Merit Cross 2nd Class without Swords and 1st Class without Swords (1941)
- Golden Hitler Youth Badge with Oak Leaves (22 September 1941)

== Bibliography ==
- Joachim Lilla (Bearbeiter): Statisten in Uniform. Die Mitglieder des Reichstags 1933–1945. Droste Verlag, Düsseldorf 2004, ISBN 3-7700-5254-4.
- Joachim Lilla (Bearbeiter): Die stellvertretenden Gauleiter und die Vertretung der Gauleiter der NSDAP im „Dritten Reich“. Wirtschaftsverlag NW, Bremerhaven 2003, ISBN 3-86509-020-6 (= Materialien aus dem Bundesarchiv, Heft 13).
- Miller, Michael D.; Schulz, Andreas (2012). Gauleiter: The Regional Leaders of the Nazi Party and Their Deputies, 1925-1945. Vol. I (Herbert Albrecht – H. Wilhelm Huttmann). R. James Bender Publishing. ISBN 978-1-932970-21-0.
- Miller, Michael (2015). Leaders of the Storm Troops. Vol. 1. England: Helion & Company. ISBN 978-1-909982-87-1.
- Michael Rademacher: Handbuch der NSDAP-Gaue 1928–1945. Die Amtsträger der NSDAP und ihrer Organisationen auf Gau- und Kreisebene in Deutschland und Österreich sowie in den Reichsgauen Danzig-Westpreußen, Sudetenland und Wartheland. Lingenbrink, Vechta 2000, ISBN 3-8311-0216-3.
- Wolfgang Stelbrink: Die Kreisleiter der NSDAP in Westfalen und Lippe. Versuch einer Kollektivbiographie mit biographischem Anhang. Nordrhein-Westfälisches Staatsarchiv, Münster 2003, ISBN 3-932892-14-3 (= Veröffentlichungen der staatlichen Archive des Landes Nordrhein-Westfalen, Reihe C, Band 48).
- Mirosław Węcki: Fritz Bracht (1899–1945). Nazistowski zarządca Górnego Śląska w latach II wojny światowej. Katowice 2014, ISBN 978-83-63031-24-4.
- Mirosław Węcki: Fritz Bracht - Gauleiter von Oberschlesien. Biographie (Paderborn: Brill / Ferdinand Schöningh, 2021), ISBN 978-3-506-70713-0
