= Albert Hoffmann (Nazi) =

German Nazi politician and war criminal (1907–1972)

- Hoffmann (center) in 1944

Gauleiter of Gau Westphalia-South (Acting Gauleiter until 17 April 1944)
- In office 26 January 1943 – 13 April 1945
- Appointed by: Adolf Hitler
- Preceded by: Paul Giesler
- Succeeded by: Position abolished

Deputy Gauleiter of Gau Upper Silesia
- In office 10 February 1941 – 26 January 1943
- Appointed by: Adolf Hitler
- Preceded by: Position created
- Succeeded by: Rudolf Metzner

Personal details
- Born: Adolf Johann Albert Hoffmann; 24 October 1907 Bremen, German Empire
- Died: 26 August 1972 (aged 64) Heiligenrode, Lower Saxony, West Germany
- Party: Nazi Party
- Occupation: Tobacco merchant

Military service
- Allegiance: Nazi Germany
- Branch/service: Heer
- Years of service: 1936–1939
- Rank: Wachtmeister
- Unit: 1st Mountain Division (Wehrmacht)
- Battles/wars: World War II (Polish Campaign)
- Awards: Iron Cross, 2nd class War Merit Cross, 1st and 2nd class with Swords

Adolf Johann Albert Hoffmann (24 October 1907 – 26 August 1972) was a German entrepreneur, who during the Third Reich served as the Nazi Gauleiter of Westphalia-South. He was also an SS-Gruppenführer. Tried for war crimes, he was acquitted for lack of evidence, but was sentenced to prison as a result of denazification proceedings.

== Early life ==
Hoffmann was born in Bremen, the son of an innkeeper. After attending Volksschule, Realschule and a trade school, Hoffmann was apprenticed and took up a job as a raw tobacco salesman. In 1925 Hoffmann joined the National Socialist Worker Youth (Nationalsozialistische Arbeiterjugend), the forerunner of the Hitler Youth. He was among the founding members of both the SA and the local Nazi Party organization in Bremen, becoming the Ortsgruppenleiter (Local Group Leader), a position he would hold until 1933. He officially joined the Nazi Party on 27 July 1926 (membership number 41,165) with membership backdated to February 1925. As an early Party member, he would later be awarded the Golden Party Badge. He also served as the propaganda leader in the Oldenburg area between 1927 and 1928, at the same time working as a commercial tobacco trader in Amsterdam. For the next several years, he traveled throughout Germany as the representative of various tobacco houses.

== Pre-war career in Nazi Germany ==
Following the Nazi seizure of power in January 1933, Hoffmann's career began a rapid rise. He became the propaganda leader in the Bremen Kreis (county) on 1 April 1933. On 1 July 1933, he left his occupation as a raw tobacco merchant to become a full-time Party functionary, assuming the management of the organization, press and personnel offices in the Bremen Kreis. On 20 August 1934, he moved into the Party's Reichsleitung (national leadership) as the leader of the department for organizational issues. This was on the staff of Deputy Führer, Rudolf Hess at the Brown House in Munich. From 5 September 1935 until January 1941, Hoffmann held the position of Amtsleiter (Office Leader) for Office IIA (General Organizational Matters). Here he was involved with social, economic, transport and agricultural policy, as well as ethnic policy. On 9 November 1936, Hoffmann, who had terminated his active membership in the SA in the summer of 1934, joined the Allgemeine-SS (membership number 278,225) as an SS-Obersturmfuhrer assigned to the SS Main Office.

After the Anschluss of Austria in March 1938, Hoffmann became a "stoppage commissioner for associations and organizations" in Vienna on the staff of Josef Bürckel, the Reich Commissioner for the Reunification of Austria with the German Reich. This position mainly involved taking care of property law matters. At the same time, he was responsible for building up the Party in the newly acquired territory. From 1 October 1938 to 31 March 1939, he served in the same capacity in the Sudetenland on the staff of Reichskommissar and Gauleiter Konrad Henlein. From May to September 1939, he was given the same assignment for the newly formed Protectorate of Bohemia and Moravia. On 15 March 1939 Hoffmann was transferred from the SS Main Office to the SD Main Office (later the RSHA) where he served until 21 September 1942.

== Wartime service and Holocaust involvement ==
Hoffmann had undergone military reserve training in the summers of 1936, 1937 and 1939. From the outbreak of the Second World War on 1 September 1939 to 25 November, he took part in battles in the Lemberg (today, Lviv) area, during the Nazi invasion of Poland. He served as an Unteroffizier in a Kradschützen (motorcycle) squadron of the 1st Mountain Division, was promoted to Wachtmeister and was awarded the Iron Cross, 2nd class.

On 10 February 1941, while retaining his other Party offices, he became the first Deputy Gauleiter of the recently established Gau Upper Silesia where he also served as Gau chairman (Gauobmann) for the German Labour Front administration. On 3 June 1941, he also secured a seat in the Reichstag representing electoral constituency 7 (Breslau), where he replaced a deceased deputy.

From 5 May to 20 September 1942 Hoffmann was detailed to serve as Reichsleiter Martin Bormann's representative on the commission headed by Generalleutnant Walter von Unruh, seeking to mobilize the population for total war and replenish losses of manpower. In this capacity, Hoffmann traveled widely through the occupied eastern territories, including the General Government, Ostland and Ukraine. On 17-18 July 1942, Hoffmann, accompanied by Reichsführer-SS Heinrich Himmler and Gauleiter Fritz Bracht, attended a gassing operation of Jews in the Auschwitz concentration camp, which was located in his Gau. He gained insights into the actions of the Einsatzgruppen murders, the death camps of Operation Reinhard, the Germanization process and the brutal measures used to recruit Ostarbeiter (Eastern workers), and he made suggestions for improvement (Verbesserungsvorschlägen) from the Party Chancellery as well as Hitler and Joseph Goebbels. After completing his detail to the Unruh commission, Hoffmann was transferred from the RSHA to the personal staff of the Reichsführer-SS on 21 September 1942. He also returned to his post as Deputy Gauleiter in Kattowitz (today, Katowice) where he also served as Gau economics adviser.

== Gauleiter in South Westphalia ==
On 26 January 1943 Hoffmann was appointed Acting Gauleiter of Gau Westphalia-South, succeeding Paul Giesler who had been transferred to Gau Munich-Upper Bavaria. At the same time, Hoffmann also was made Reich Defense Commissioner for his Gau. On 1 August he was named to the Prussian State Council by Prussian Minister President Hermann Göring, becoming the last known appointee to that body. On 9 November he received his final promotion to SS-Gruppenführer. In December of the same year, Hitler appointed Hoffmann as Goebbels' deputy in his capacity as Reich Inspector for Civil Aerial Warfare Measures, despite the fact that Goebbels favored another candidate for the post. On 17 April 1944, Hofmann was made permanent Gauleiter of Westphalia-South. On 25 September 1944 he was placed in command of the Volksturm units in his jurisdiction. In October he was named Reich Defense Commissioner for the entire Rhineland and Ruhr regions.

On 26 February 1945, Hoffmann issued to the police, Party and civil officials in his jurisdiction the following order, sanctioning the vigilante lynching of downed Allied fighter-bomber pilots:

Jagtbomber pilots who are shot down are in principle not to be protected against the fury of the people. I expect from all police officers that they will refuse to lend their protection to these gangster types. Authorities acting in contradiction to the popular sentiment will have to account to me.

Hoffmann, who did not enjoy widespread popularity even within the Nazi Party's top ranks owing to his arrogance and bossy manner, was said to have been a staunch Nazi right through to the war's end. Shortly before the war ended, as Allied troops were invading his jurisdiction, he ordered the destruction of numerous bridges and other infrastructure in accordance with Hitler's Nero Decree. Leaving Bochum on 10 April 1945, he retreated first to Harkortberg near Wetter and then to Haßlinghausen (today, part of Sprockhövel). Finally, on 13 April 1945, Hoffmann discussed setting up a Werwolf operation before dissolving his Gau staff and the Volkssturm organization in Westphalia-South. He and his staff went into hiding with false papers and civilian clothes.

== Post-war trial, conviction, and sentence ==
After fleeing and hiding out for several months, Hoffmann was finally discovered and arrested by British troops on 4 October 1945 in the village of Marienau, where he was posing as a farm worker. He was first imprisoned and interrogated in Iserlohn and then interned in a camp in Recklinghausen. He testified as a witness to atrocities in the Nuremberg Trials against the main Nazi war criminals. He later was himself charged in two British military criminal cases in Recklinghausen (October 1946) and Hamburg (December 1948) in connection with the murders of Allied airmen and foreign forced laborers. However, he was acquitted for lack of evidence. He was then tried by a German denazification tribunal at Benefeld-Bomlitz and received a prison sentence of 4 years and 9 months in December 1948. He only served part of his sentence, in consideration of time served and was pardoned by the Minister President of Lower Saxony.

== Later life and family ==
After his release from prison at Esterwegen in April 1950, Hoffmann earned considerable assets as an entrepreneur in Bremen until his death in Heiligenrode on 26 August 1972. Hoffmann was married, and his son Bolko Hoffmann was likewise a successful entrepreneur and the founder of the Pro DM Party, a right-wing, conservative fringe party in Germany whose main policy is to campaign for the reintroduction of the Deutsche Mark.

== SS ranks ==
SS ranks
Date	Rank
9 November 1936	SS-Obersturmführer
30 January 1937	SS-Hauptsturmführer
30 January 1938	SS-Sturmbannführer
1 April 1939	SS-Obersturmbannführer
20 April 1939	SS-Standartenführer
21 September 1942	SS-Oberführer
19 June 1943	SS-Brigadeführer
9 November 1943	SS-Gruppenführer

== Sources ==
- Blank, Ralf: Albert Hoffmann, in: Westfälische Lebensbilder 17, Münster 2005 [= Veröffentlichungen der Historischen Kommission für Westfalen XXVII A, 17].
- Blank, Ralf: Albert Hoffmann als Reichsverteidigungskommissar im Gau Westfalen-Süd, 1943-1945. Eine biografische Skizze, in: Beiträge zur Geschichte des Nationalsozialismus 17 (2001), S. 189-210.
- Blank, Ralf: "... der Volksempörung nicht zu entziehen". Gauleiter Albert Hoffmann und der "Fliegerbefehl", in: Märkisches Jahrbuch 98 (1998), S. 255-296.
- Höffkes, Karl (1986). Hitlers Politische Generale. Die Gauleiter des Dritten Reiches: ein biographisches Nachschlagewerk. Tübingen: Grabert-Verlag. ISBN 3-87847-163-7.
- Lilla, Joachim (2005). Der Preußische Staatsrat 1921–1933: Ein biographisches Handbuch. Düsseldorf: Droste Verlag. ISBN 978-3-770-05271-4.
- Longerich, Peter (2015). Goebbels: A Biography. Vintage. ISBN 978-0-099-52369-7.
- Miller, Michael D.; Schulz, Andreas (2012). Gauleiter: The Regional Leaders of the Nazi Party and Their Deputies, 1925–1945. Vol. 1 (Herbert Albrecht - H. Wilhelm Hüttmann). R. James Bender Publishing. ISBN 978-1-932-97021-0.
