= Helmuth Brückner =

Nazi leader (1896–1951)

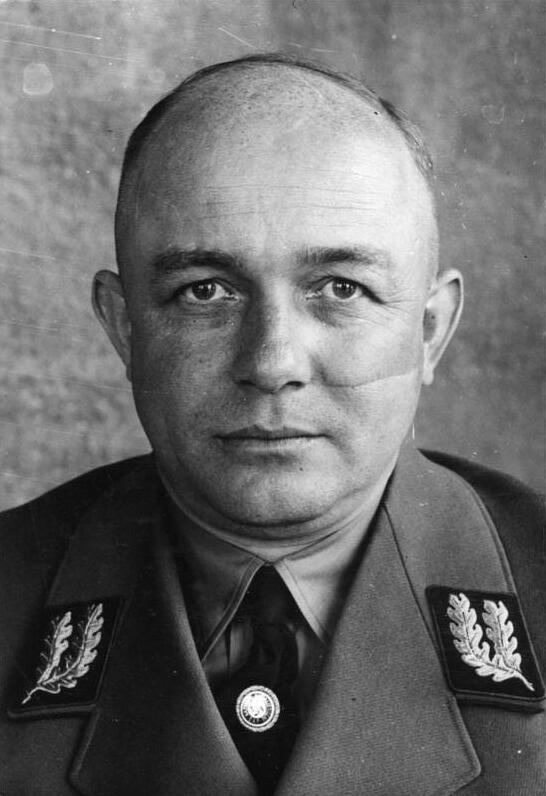
- (1934)

Gauleiter of Gau Silesia
- In office 15 March 1925 – 4 December 1934
- Succeeded by: Josef Wagner

Oberpräsident of Lower Silesia
- In office 25 March 1933 – 12 December 1934
- Succeeded by: Josef Wagner

Oberpräsident of Upper Silesia
- In office 29 May 1933 – 12 December 1934
- Succeeded by: Josef Wagner

Personal details
- Born: 7 May 1896 Peilau, Prussia
- Died: 12 January 1951 (aged 54) Tayshet, USSR
- Education: History, geography, philosophy and economics
- Alma mater: Friedrich Wilhelm University

Military service
- Allegiance: German Empire
- Branch/service: Imperial German Army
- Years of service: 1914–1918
- Rank: Leutnant der Reserve
- Unit: Feld-Artillerie-Regiment 88
- Battles/wars: World War I Silesian Uprisings

Helmuth Brückner (7 May 1896 – 12 January 1951?) was Gauleiter of the Nazi Party in Silesia from 1925 until 1934, when he fell out of political favor due to accusations of homosexuality.

== Life ==
Helmuth Brückner was born on 7 May 1896 in Peilau, a part of Prussia at the time. He attended Volkschule in Peilau, Höhere Knabenschule in Langenbielau, and Kgl. Realgymnasium in Reichenbach. He then studied at Schlesische Friedrich-Wilhelms-Universität zu Breslau (today, the University of Wrocław).

In 1914, Brückner volunteered for the Army and was posted with the Feld-Artillerie-Regiment 88 where he won the Iron Cross 2nd and 1st Class as Leutnant der Reserve and Abteilung-Adjutant. On 25 March 1918 he was seriously wounded while in France. In 1921 he was Ib–Gruppe Nord with the Deutschen Selbstschutz (Freikorps) in Oberschlesien.

He participated in the failed “Beer Hall Putsch” on 9 November 1923, was briefly detained, tried and released on probation. In 1924, Brückner joined the National Socialist Freedom Movement (the NSDAP had been banned after the failed putsch) and became editor of Schlesien Volksstimme. He also became Stadtverordneter (City Councilor) in Breslau, a position he held until 1926.

Brückner organized the NSDAP in Silesia; on 15 March 1925 he officially joined the refounded NSDAP (number 2,023) and was appointed Gauleiter for Gau Silesia. It was at this time he also founded the publishing house NS-Schlesien which published the “Schlesischen Beobachters”. In September 1925, he became a member of the National Socialist Working Association, a short-lived group of north and northwest German Gauleiter, organized and led by Gregor Strasser, which unsuccessfully sought to amend the Party program. It was dissolved in 1926 following the Bamberg Conference. In September 1930, he was elected a member of the Reichstag for electoral constituency 7, Breslau, and on 24 April 1932 he became a member of the Landtag of Prussia, retaining these seats until December 1934. On 17 August 1932 Brückner was named Landesinspekteur-East charged with oversight responsibility for three eastern Gaue (Silesia, Danzig and East Prussia). This was a short-lived initiative by Strasser to centralize control over the Gaue. However, it was unpopular with all the Gauleiter and was repealed on Strasser's fall from power in December 1932. Brückner then returned to his Gauleiter position in Silesia.

On 25 March 1933, Brückner was appointed the acting Oberpräsident of the Prussian Province of Lower Silesia (made permanent on 2 August). He also served as the provincial representative to the Reichsrat from 11 April 1933 until its abolition on 14 February 1934. Additionally, on 29 May 1933, he was named acting Oberpräsident of the Prussian Province of Upper Silesia (made permanent on 1 June). He thus united under his control the highest Party and governmental offices in the two provinces. On 11 July 1933, Brückner was appointed to the Prussian State Council by Prussian Minister-President Hermann Göring. On 7 October 1933 he was promoted to Gruppenführer in the Sturmabteilung (SA).

He was accused of homosexual activity under Paragraph 175, but he argued that he was bisexual, and that his mutual masturbation with another officer was a normal activity, and was not immediately convicted. However, he was dismissed as Gauleiter and from the SA on 4 December 1934, removed from all his government posts on 12 December and on 25 December he was expelled from the NSDAP in connection with the "Röhm Putsch". Brückner was arrested again on 6 September 1935 and was sentenced for the first time at the end of October. On appeal, Brückner was sentenced to 15 months in prison. After serving the first half of his sentence, Hitler pardoned him in May 1936, but Brückner's application for readmission to the party was rejected.

From 1938, Brückner was working as an industrial worker in the Heinkel works in Rostock. Later, he was politically rehabilitated. Arrested by the Soviets in July 1945, he was confined in a prison camp in Thuringia until 1949, then moved to the USSR where he was also in various internment camps. There is some uncertainty surrounding his date of death, as official sources give the year of his death as both 1951 and 1954, and appear to hide the specific date and place.

== Decorations and awards ==
- Honour Cross of the World War 1914/1918
- Wound Badge
- Iron Cross of 1914, 1st and 2nd class
- Silesian Eagle, 1st and 2nd class
