= Karl Hanke =

German Nazi, Gauleiter, last Reichsführer-SS (1903–1945)

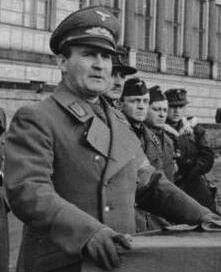
- Hanke in 1945

5th Reichsführer-SS
- In office 29 April 1945 – 8 May 1945
- President: Adolf Hitler; Karl Dönitz
- Chancellor: Adolf Hitler; Joseph Goebbels; Lutz Graf Schwerin von Krosigk
- Preceded by: Heinrich Himmler
- Succeeded by: Office abolished

Chief of the German Police
- In office 29 April 1945 – 8 May 1945
- Preceded by: Heinrich Himmler
- Succeeded by: Office abolished

Gauleiter of Gau Lower Silesia
- In office 27 January 1941 – 8 May 1945
- Appointed by: Adolf Hitler
- Preceded by: New Gau created
- Succeeded by: Office abolished

Oberpräsident of the Province of Lower Silesia
- In office 1 February 1941 – 8 May 1945
- Preceded by: Office created
- Succeeded by: Office abolished

State Secretary for the Ministry of Public Enlightenment and Propaganda
- In office 26 November 1937 – 27 January 1941
- Appointed by: Adolf Hitler
- Preceded by: Walther Funk
- Succeeded by: Leopold Gutterer

Personal details
- Born: Karl August Hanke; 24 August 1903 Lauban, Province of Silesia, Kingdom of Prussia, German Empire
- Died: 8 June 1945 (aged 41) Neudorf, Ústí nad Labem Region, Czechoslovakia
- Party: Nazi Party
- Spouse: Baroness Freda von Fircks (m. 1944)
- Children: 1
- Education: Berufspädagogisches Institut, Berlin
- Profession: Politician

Military service
- Allegiance: Nazi Germany
- Branch/service: Schutzstaffel; Allgemeine-SS
- Rank: Reichsführer-SS

Karl August Hanke (24 August 1903 – 8 June 1945) was a German Nazi official and politician who served as the fifth and final Reichsführer of the Schutzstaffel (SS). He also served as Gauleiter of Gau Lower Silesia from 1941 to 1945 and as Oberpräsident of the Prussian Province of Lower Silesia. Captured on 6 May 1945, he was shot and wounded during an escape attempt and then beaten to death by Czech guards on 8 June, after the war had ended.

== Early life ==
Hanke was born in Lauban (present-day Lubań) in Silesia, on 24 August 1903. His older brother was killed in World War I. Hanke was too young for service in the war and attended Gymnasium through Obersekunda. He served in the Reichswehr as a Zeitfreiwilliger (temporary volunteer) in the 19th Infantry Regiment (von Courbiere) at Frankfurt/Oder from 1920 to 1921.

Hanke obtained an education as a milling engineer by attending the German Millers' School at Dippoldiswalde. He then decided to obtain a year's practical experience as a railway workshop apprentice before returning to milling. From 1921 to around 1926, Hanke mainly worked in the milling industry, serving as a business manager for mills in the vicinity of Silesia, Bavaria, and Tyrol. He later attended the Berufspädagogische Institut in Berlin, receiving a degree that qualified him to teach milling at vocational schools. Later in 1928, he worked in Berlin-Steglitz as a master miller. After this he became a vocational instructor at a technical school in Berlin.

== Nazi Party ==
Hanke joined the Nazi Party on 1 November 1928, with membership number 102606. Hanke began his career at the somewhat low level of Amtswalter, a low ranking speaker and factory cell organizer in Berlin. He joined the Sturmabteilung (SA) Reserve in 1929; that same year he became a deputy street cell leader. In 1930 he was promoted to street cell leader (Strassenzellenleiter) and then a section leader (Sektionsführer) in Berlin.

Hanke was fired from his teaching position at the vocational school in April 1931 for his political agitation for the Nazi Party. He went to work full-time for the party. By late 1931, he was Kreisleiter (ward leader) of Westend in Berlin, working under Berlin's Gauleiter Joseph Goebbels. In 1932, Hanke was made chief Gau organizational director and on 1 April 1932, personal adjutant and Referent (advisor) to Goebbels in his capacity as propaganda director of the NSDAP (Reichspropagandaleiter der NSDAP).

In his position as Kreisleiter of Westend in Berlin, Hanke was the first party official to establish contact with the young architect Albert Speer. Hanke contracted Speer to convert a villa in the western suburbs into an office for the local party organization in 1932. Hanke and Speer became close friends. In 1944, according to Speer's book (Inside the Third Reich), Hanke strongly advised Speer never to visit "a camp in Upper Silesia" (Auschwitz) for any reason. Hanke had "seen something that he was not allowed to describe and indeed could not describe".

== Government service ==
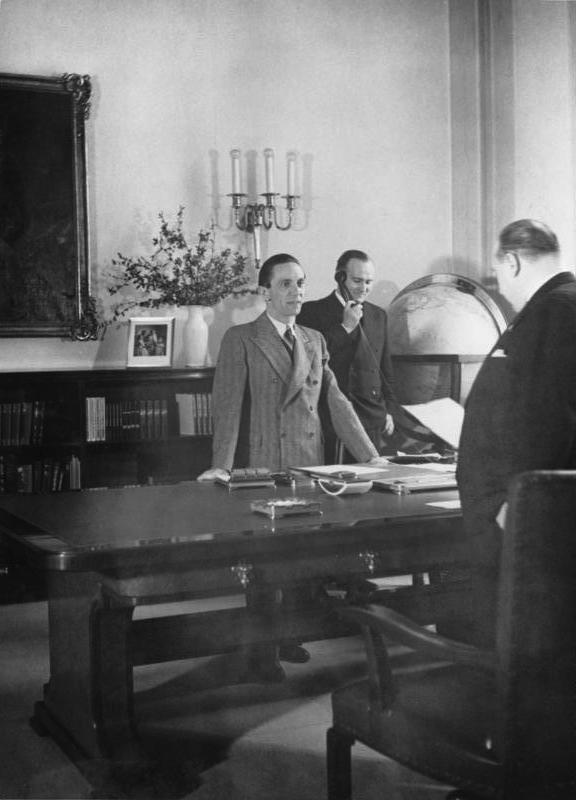
Reichsminister Goebbels has a meeting with his Staatssekretär, Walther Funk, in his office at the Ministry. In the background, Referent des Ministers Karl Hanke takes a call.

Adolf Hitler took an early liking to the outspoken young Hanke, who by April 1932 had become a Nazi Party deputy to the Landtag of Prussia. In November 1932, Hanke was elected to the national parliament (Reichstag) as a Nazi deputy from electoral constituency 4 (Potsdam II, reconfigured as Berlin East in March 1936). He held this seat until the end of the war in Europe.

Hanke again secured a task for Albert Speer in July 1932, having him build a headquarters for the Berlin NSDAP in the centre of the city (at Vossstrasse 11). Following the Nazi takeover of power and the parliamentary elections of March 1933, Goebbels established the Propaganda Ministry (Propagandaministerium). Hanke followed his boss there as his private secretary and aide. At the time, Hanke was a favorite of Goebbels and accompanied his boss on official visits to Italy and Poland. On 15 February 1934, Hanke joined the Allgemeine SS or general SS with membership number 203,103. He was attached to the 6th SS-Standarte which was situated in Berlin. This led to Hanke serving as a special duties officer on the staff of the Reichsfuhrer-SS Heinrich Himmler from January 1935 through 1 April 1936. Then in late 1937, he was promoted to State Secretary (Deputy Minister) in the Propaganda Ministry. The effective date for the promotion being 15 January 1938. Also in January 1938, he became second vice president of the Reichskulturkammer (Reich Chamber of Culture; RKK) succeeding Walther Funk.

Hanke's seemingly unstoppable ascent on the coattails of Goebbels came to a sudden, albeit temporary, halt when he was drawn into the marital affairs of Joseph Goebbels and his wife, Magda. Goebbels had many extramarital affairs. By the winter of 1937, Goebbels began an intense affair with the Czech actress Lída Baarová. After Magda Goebbels learned of this, she had a long conversation with Hitler about it on 15 August 1938. Hitler was very fond of Magda and the Goebbels's young children. He demanded that Goebbels break off the affair. Thereafter, Joseph and Magda seemed to reach a "truce" until the end of September. The couple had another falling out at that point. Goebbels asked Hanke to act as a mediator with Magda on his behalf, but things did not go well. Hanke also spoke with Hitler as to the matter, who stated he would discuss it in private with Joseph Goebbels. Hitler became involved to make the couple stay together. Later in July 1939, Magda confessed to her husband that beginning in October 1938, she had had an affair with Hanke. Hitler once again became involved and told the Goebbels they had to stay together and the affair was ended. Joseph Goebbels immediately sent Hanke off on vacation. Hanke did not subsequently return to his position at the Propaganda Ministry.

== World War II ==
In July 1939, Hanke was called up for military service, having previously obtained a reserve officer's commission in 1937. From September to October 1939, he served with the 3rd Panzer Division in Poland. In May 1940, sensing a good opportunity to further his career, Hanke served under General Erwin Rommel in France with the 7th Panzer Division, 25th Panzer Regiment through June of that year. He "got along" well with Rommel who appreciated good "public relations". Hanke was removed from Rommel's staff by Rommel after an incident in the officer's mess in which Hanke suggested that he had the power to remove Rommel from his command, Hanke was already well known and disliked on Rommel's staff on account of his high handed attitude. Along with his removal Rommel made a long report about Hanke to Hitler's adjutant. Hanke was awarded the Iron Cross in Second and First Class. He was discharged from the German Army in 1941 with the rank of 1st lieutenant (Oberleutnant).

He left active military service and in Breslau, Hitler appointed Hanke to the position of Gauleiter of the newly formed Gau Lower Silesia on 27 January 1941. On 1 February, he was appointed Oberpräsident of the Prussian Province of Lower Silesia, thus uniting under his control the highest party and governmental offices in the province. Finally, on 9 February Hanke was named Reich Defense Commissioner for Wehrkreis (Military District) VIII, which included his Gau as well as Gau Upper Silesia and the eastern sections of Reichsgau Sudetenland. On 20 April 1941, Himmler promoted him to the rank of SS general (SS-Gruppenführer). Hanke was a fanatical enforcer of Nazi policy: during his rule in Breslau more than 1,000 people were executed on his orders, earning him the nickname "Hangman of Breslau". On 16 November 1942, the jurisdiction of the Reich Defense Commissioners was changed from the Wehrkreis to the Gau level, and Hanke remained Commissioner only for his Gau. On 30 January 1944, Hanke was promoted to SS-Obergruppenführer.

Hanke had a long affair with Baroness Freda von Fircks in Breslau, the daughter of a wealthy landowner and University of Berlin lecturer. They were finally married on 25 November 1944, after she gave birth to their daughter in December 1943.

=== The 1945 fall of Breslau ===
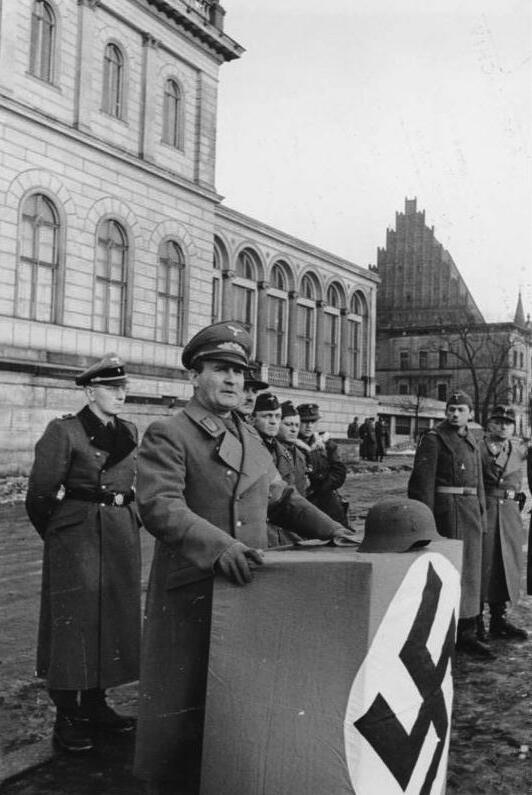
Gauleiter Hanke addresses a new battalion of Volkssturm in Breslau, February 1945

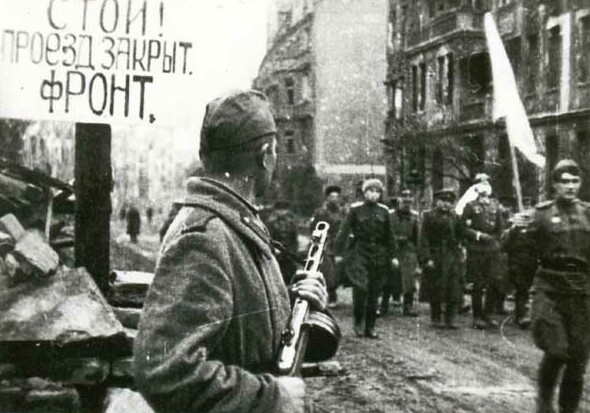
Delegation of German officers walking for negotiations before capitulation of Festung Breslau, 6 May 1945

During the waning months of World War II, as the Soviet Red Army advanced into Silesia and encircled Fortress Breslau (Festung Breslau), Hanke was named by Hitler to be the city's "Battle Commander" (Kampfkommandant). Hanke oversaw, with fanaticism, the defense of the city during the Siege of Breslau. Goebbels, dictating for his diary, repeatedly expressed his admiration of Hanke during the spring of 1945. During the 82-day siege, Soviet forces inflicted approximately 30,000 civilian and military casualties and took more than 40,000 prisoners, while suffering 60,000 total casualties. However, somewhat quirkily, throughout the siege, the Aviatik tobacco factory produced 500,000 cigarettes a day. Occasionally, concerts were held during lulls in the bombardment. On 6 May, the day before Germany's surrender, General Hermann Niehoff surrendered the besieged Breslau, the Soviet army already having reached Berlin. Hanke had flown out the previous day in a small Fieseler Storch plane kept in reserve for him.

Breslau was the last major city in Germany to surrender. Destruction by Soviet aerial and artillery bombardment, along with acts of destruction committed by the SS and Nazi Party members, brought "80 to 90 percent" of Breslau to a state of ruin.

Hanke's fanaticism and unconditional obedience to Hitler's orders impressed Hitler, who in his political testament appointed him to be the last Reichsführer-SS and Chief of the German Police, replacing Heinrich Himmler on 29 April 1945. Eight days beforehand, Hanke had been honored with the Nazi Party's highest decoration, the German Order, a reward for his defence of Breslau against the advancing Soviet Red Army. Hanke's ascendancy to the rank of Reichsführer-SS was a result of Hitler proclaiming Himmler a traitor for his secretly-attempted surrender negotiations with the Western Allies. Hitler stripped Himmler of all his offices and ranks and ordered his arrest.

== Death ==
Hanke received word of his promotion on 5 May 1945. He flew to Prague and attached himself to the 18th SS-Freiwilligen-Panzer-Grenadier-Division "Horst Wessel". Hanke chose to wear the uniform of an SS private, to conceal his identity in the event of capture. The group attempted to fight its way back to Germany but, after a fierce battle with Czech partisans, surrendered in Nová Ves, southwest of Chomutov, on 6 May. His true identity was not discovered by his captors, and Hanke was thus placed in a prisoner of war (POW) camp alongside low-ranking SS members. There were a total of 65 POWs when the Czechs decided to move them all by foot in June 1945. On 8 June when a train passed the march route, Hanke and several other POWs attempted to escape, clinging to the train. The Czechs opened fire, wounding Hanke and two other POWs. They were then beaten to death with rifle butts by the Czechs.

== Summary of his SS and military career ==
Dates of rank

- SS-Anwärter – 15 February 1934
- SS-Sturmbannführer – 1 July 1934
- SS-Obersturmbannführer – 20 April 1935
- SS-Standartenführer – 15 September 1935
- SS-Oberführer – 20 April 1937
- Panzerschütze – 1937
- Leutnant d.R. – 1939
- Oberleutnant d.R. – 1940
- SS-Brigadeführer – 30 January 1941
- SS-Gruppenführer – 20 April 1941
- Hauptmann d.R. – 1942
- SS-Obergruppenführer – 30 January 1944
- Reichsführer-SS und Chef der Deutschen Polizei – 29 April 1945

Decorations

- Honour Chevron for the Old Guard
- SS Honour Ring
- Sword of honour of the Reichsführer-SS
- Golden Party Badge
- SS Long Service Award, 2nd, 3rd and 4th classes
- Nazi Party Long Service Award in Bronze and Silver
- War Merit Cross, 1st and 2nd class, both without Swords
- Olympic Games Decoration, First Class (1936)
- German Equestrian Badge in Silver (1938)
- Wound Badge in Black (1939)
- Panzer Badge in Silver (1940)
- Iron Cross of 1939, 1st and 2nd class (1940)
- Hitler Youth Badge of Honour in Gold with Oak Leaves (30 August 1941)
- German Order (12 April 1945)

== See also ==
- List of Gauleiters

Government offices
Preceded by Heinrich Himmler	Reich Leader of the SS; 1945	Succeeded by Office abolished
