= Nová Ves (Louny District) =

- Municipality
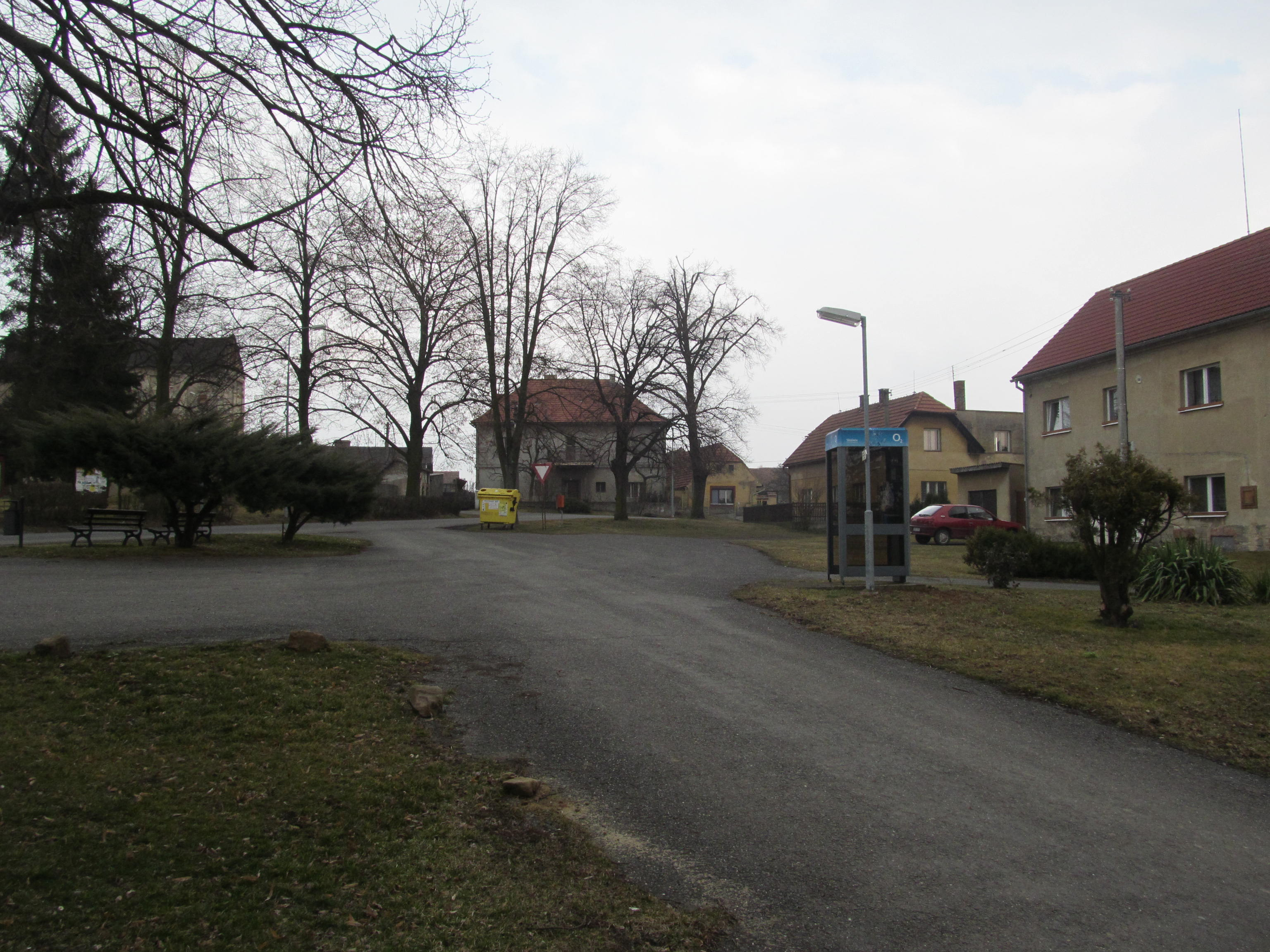
- Centre of Nová Ves

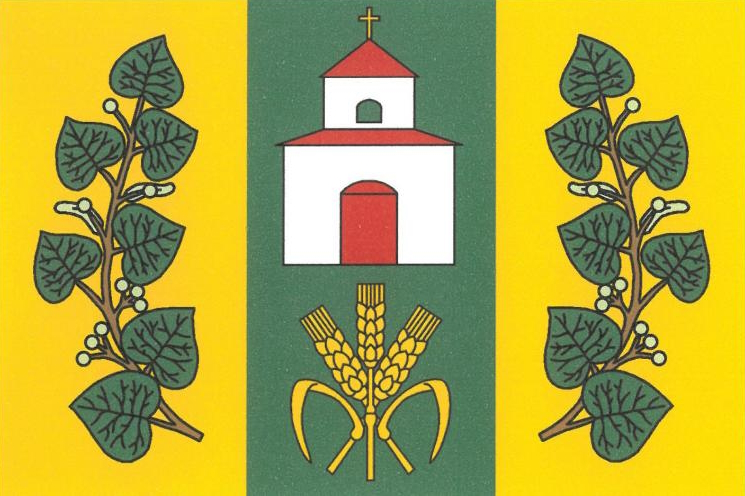
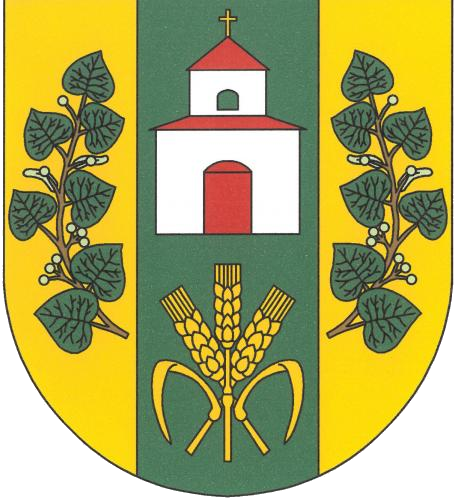
- Flag Coat of arms

- Location in the Czech Republic
- Coordinates: 50°17′9″N 13°50′34″E
- Country: Czech Republic
- Region: Ústí nad Labem
- District: Louny
- First mentioned: 1347

Area
  - Total: 6.12 km^{2} (2.36 sq mi)
- Elevation: 370 m (1,210 ft)

Population (2026-01-01)
  - Total: 125
  - Density: 20.4/km^{2} (52.9/sq mi)
- Time zone: UTC+1 (CET)
  - Summer (DST): UTC+2 (CEST)
- Postal code: 440 01
- Website: www.novavesln.cz

Nová Ves (German: Neudorf) is a municipality and village in Louny District in the Ústí nad Labem Region of the Czech Republic. It has about 100 inhabitants.

Nová Ves lies approximately 9 kilometres (6 mi) south of Louny, 44 km (27 mi) south of Ústí nad Labem, and 48 km (30 mi) north-west of Prague.

== Demographics ==
Historical population
Year	Pop.	±%
1869	286	—
1880	294	+2.8%
1890	293	−0.3%
1900	308	+5.1%
1910	302	−1.9%
1921	313	+3.6%
1930	292	−6.7%
1950	188	−35.6%
1961	179	−4.8%
1970	153	−14.5%
1980	122	−20.3%
1991	100	−18.0%
2001	104	+4.0%
2011	105	+1.0%
2021	116	+10.5%
Source: Censuses
