= Emil Kaschub =

Nazi doctor (1919–1977)

Emil Kaschub (3 April 1919 – 4 May 1977), also called Heinz Kaschub, was a German doctor who conducted experiments on Nazi concentration camp prisoners. On the instructions of the Wehrmacht, healthy prisoners were subjected to applications and injections of toxic substances. The subsequent wounds, often festering and blistered, were documented for "scientific" enlightenment. He avoided arrest after the war and worked as head of surgery at the Bethanien Hospital in Frankfurt am Main until his wartime activities were discovered in the 1970s. Criminal charges were filed against him but he died before he could be prosecuted.
