= Gau Silesia =

Administrative division of Nazi Germany

- Gau of Nazi Germany
- 1925–1941
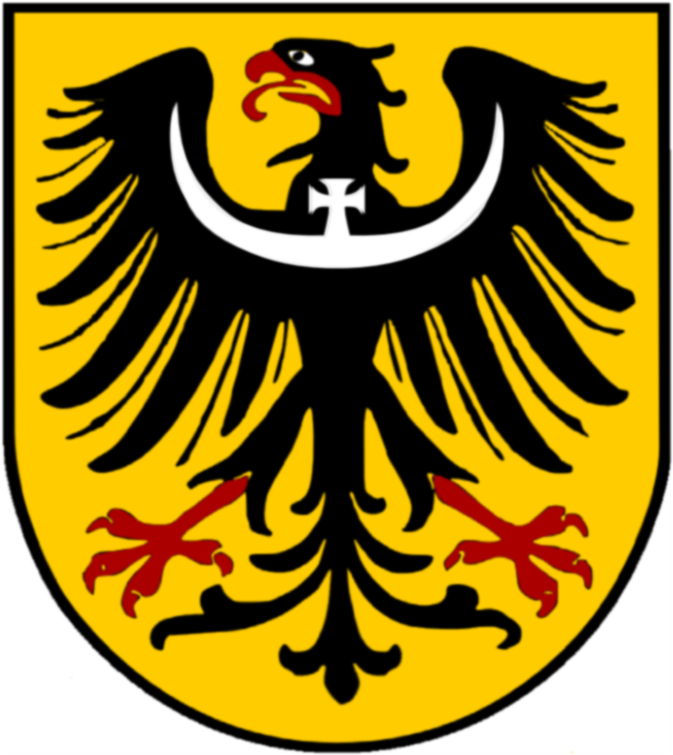
- Flag Coat of arms

- Capital: Breslau
- Government
- Gauleiter
  - 1925–1934: Helmuth Brückner
  - 1934–1941: Josef Wagner
- History
  - Establishment: 15 March 1925
  - Disestablishment: 27 January 1941
Preceded by	Succeeded by
Province of Upper Silesia; Province of Lower Silesia	Gau Upper Silesia; Gau Lower Silesia
- Today part of: Germany; Poland; Czech Republic

The Gau Silesia (German: Gau Schlesien) formed on 15 March 1925, was an administrative division of Nazi Germany from 1933 to 1941 in the Prussian Province of Silesia. From 1925 to 1933, it was the regional subdivision of the Nazi Party for this area. The Gau was split into Lower Silesia and Upper Silesia on 27 January 1941. The majority of the former Gau became part of Poland after the Second World War, with small parts in the far west becoming part of the future East Germany.

== History ==
The Nazi Gau (plural Gaue) system was originally established in a party conference on 22 May 1926, in order to improve administration of the party structure. From 1933 onwards, after the Nazi seizure of power, the Gaue increasingly replaced the German states as administrative subdivisions in Germany.

At the head of each Gau stood a Gauleiter, a position which became increasingly more powerful, especially after the outbreak of the Second World War, with little interference from above. Local Gauleiters often held government positions as well as party ones and were in charge of, among other things, propaganda and surveillance and, from September 1944 onward, the Volkssturm and the defense of the Gau.

The position of Gauleiter in Silesia was held by Helmuth Brückner from 1925 to 1934 and Josef Wagner from 1934 to 1941 when the gau was finally split up. Brückner was removed from his position some months after the Night of the Long Knives and expelled from the Nazi Party. He died in Soviet captivity in 1951. His successor Wagner, who was also Gauleiter of Westphalia-South, was stripped of his Gauleiter position in Silesia in January 1941 and in Westphalia-South in November 1941, and was eventually expelled from the Nazi Party. Arrested by the Gestapo in 1944, he died in late April or early May 1945 under unclear circumstances.

== See also ==
- Gauliga Schlesien, the highest association football league in the Gauliga from 1933 to 1941
