= Gau Lower Silesia =

- Gau of Nazi Germany
- 1941–1945
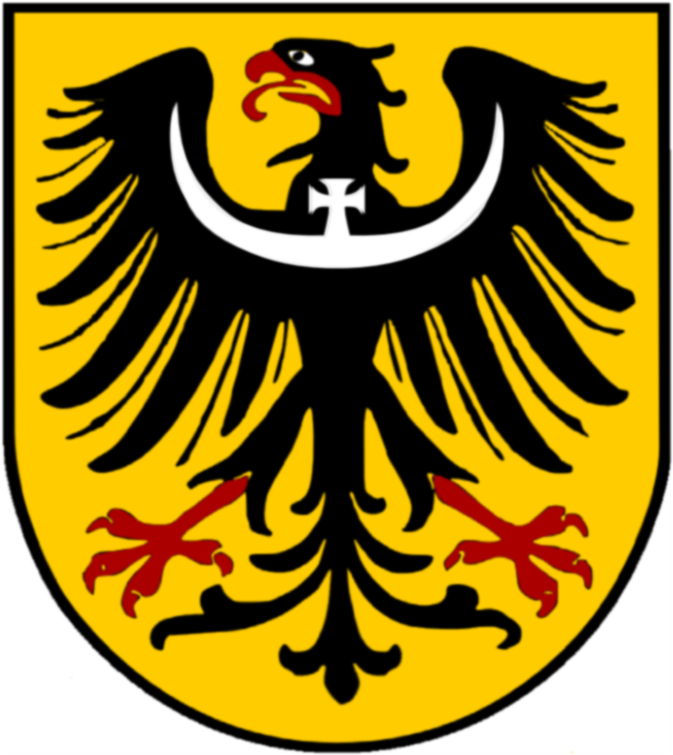
- Flag Coat of arms

- Capital: Breslau
- Government
- Gauleiter
  - 1941–1945: Karl Hanke
- History
  - Establishment: 27 January 1941
  - Disestablishment: 1 August 1945
Preceded by
Gau Silesia
Succeeded by
Poland
Saxony
Brandenburg
- Today part of: Germany Poland

The Gau Lower Silesia (German: Gau Niederschlesien) was an administrative division of Nazi Germany from 1941 to 1945 in the Lower Silesia part of the Prussian Province of Silesia. The Gau was created when the Gau Silesia was split into Lower Silesia and Upper Silesia in 1941. The majority of the former Gau became part of Poland after the Second World War, with small parts in the far west becoming part of the future East Germany.

== History ==
The Nazi Gau (plural Gaue) system was originally established in a party conference on 22 May 1926, in order to improve administration of the party structure. From 1933 onwards, after the Nazi seizure of power, the Gaue increasingly replaced the German states as administrative subdivisions in Germany.

At the head of each Gau stood a Gauleiter, a position which became increasingly more powerful, especially after the outbreak of the Second World War, with little interference from above. Local Gauleiters often held both the government and party positions and were in charge of, among other things, propaganda, surveillance and, from September 1944 onward, the Volkssturm and the defense of the Gau.

The position of Gauleiter in Lower Silesia was held by Karl Hanke throughout the short history of the Gau. On 29 April 1945, Hitler, in his political testament, appointed Hanke to be the last Reichsführer-SS and Chief of the German Police, replacing Heinrich Himmler. Hanke who evacuated the Gau's capital too late and, for a long time, refused its surrender during the Siege of Breslau escaped shortly before the eventual surrender of Breslau on 6 May 1945. Hanke was killed by Czech partisans after having been captured and making an escape attempt.

The Gross-Rosen concentration camp was located in the Gau Lower Silesia. Of the 140,000 prisoners that were sent to the camp 40,000 perished.

== See also ==
- Gauliga Niederschlesien, the highest association football league in the Gauliga from 1941 to 1945
