= Gau Westphalia-South =

German territorial division of the Nazi Party, 1930–1945

- Gau of Nazi Germany
- 1931–1945
- Flag Coat of arms

- Capital: Bochum
- Government
- Gauleiter
  - 1931–1941: Josef Wagner
  - 1941–1943: Paul Giesler
  - 1943–1945: Albert Hoffmann
- History
  - Establishment: 1 January 1931
  - Disestablishment: 8 May 1945
Preceded by	Succeeded by
Province of Westphalia	North Rhine-Westphalia
- Today part of: Germany

The Gau Westphalia-South (German: Gau Westfalen-Süd) was an administrative division of Nazi Germany encompassing the Arnsberg Region in the southern part of the Prussian province of Westphalia between 1933 and 1945. From 1931 to 1933, it was the regional subdivision of the Nazi Party for these areas.

== History ==
The Nazi Gau (plural Gaue) system was originally established in a party conference on 22 May 1926, in order to improve administration of the party structure. From 1933 onwards, after the Nazi seizure of power, the Gaue increasingly replaced the German states as administrative subdivisions in Germany.

At the head of each Gau stood a Gauleiter, a position which became increasingly more powerful, especially after the outbreak of the Second World War, with little interference from above. Local Gauleiters often held government positions as well as party ones and were in charge of, among other things, propaganda and surveillance and, from September 1944 onward, the Volkssturm and the defense of the Gau.

The position of Gauleiter in Westphalia-South was held by Josef Wagner from January 1931 to November 1941, followed by Paul Giesler from November 1941 to January 1943 and Albert Hoffmann from January 1943 to May 1945. Wagner was stripped of his Gauleiter position in 1941 and expelled from the Nazi Party. Arrested by the Gestapo in 1944 died in May 1945 under unclear circumstances. Giesler, a well connected member of the top-hierarchy of Nazi Germany, held a number of high offices during the era, last of those as the German Minister of the Interior in the final days of the war. He was involved in the repression of the German resistance and, after a suicide attempt, was shot by his adjutant on 8 May 1945. Hoffmann, the last Gauleiter of Westphalia-South, initially went into hiding after the war. Arrested in October 1945 he was called as a witness in a number of trials and imprisoned for almost five years. He died in West Germany in 1972 after a successful business career, not charged with any further crimes committed during the Nazi era.

=== Allied invasion and occupation ===
Near the end of World War II, the Gau was invaded by the western allies, who would gradually capture its territory until the end of the war. The timeline of the allied advance is detailed in the table below.

Date of capture	Location	Ref
10 April 1945	Bochum	
11 April 1945	Witten	
12 April 1945	Plettenberg	
12-13 April 1945	Breckerfeld	
13 April 1945	Dortmund	
14 April 1945	Hagen	
14 April 1945	Schwelm	
15 April 1945	Hattingen	
