= Gau Upper Silesia =

Administrative division of Nazi Germany

- Gau of Nazi Germany
- 1941–1945
- Flag Coat of arms

- Upper Silesia in gray, bordering the General Government
- Capital: Kattowitz
- Government
- Gauleiter
  - 1941–1945: Fritz Bracht
- History
  - Establishment: 27 January 1941
  - Disestablishment: 1 August 1945
Preceded by	Succeeded by
Gau Silesia	Poland; Czechoslovakia
- Today part of: Poland; Czech Republic

The Gau Upper Silesia (German: Gau Oberschlesien) was an administrative division of Nazi Germany from 1941 to 1945 in the Upper Silesia part of the Prussian Province of Silesia. The Gau was created when the Gau Silesia was split into Upper Silesia and Lower Silesia on 27 January 1941. The Gau included territory annexed by Nazi Germany after the German invasion of Poland.

== History ==
The Nazi Gau (plural Gaue) system was originally established in a party conference on 22 May 1926, in order to improve administration of the party structure. From 1933 onwards, after the Nazi seizure of power, the Gaue increasingly replaced the German states as administrative subdivisions in Germany.

At the head of each Gau stood a Gauleiter, a position which became increasingly more powerful, especially after the outbreak of the Second World War, with little interference from above. Local Gauleiters often held government positions as well as party ones and were in charge of, among other things, propaganda and surveillance and, from September 1944 onward, the Volkssturm and the defense of the Gau.

The position of Gauleiter in Upper Silesia was held by Fritz Bracht throughout the short history of the Gau. Bracht, who was not a powerful figure in the Nazi hierarchy, committed suicide on 9 May 1945.

The Auschwitz concentration camp, an extermination camp where more than 1,000,000 people were killed, was located in the Gau Upper Silesia, near Oświęcim. The camp was liberated by the Soviet Army in January 1945.

== See also ==
- Gauliga Oberschlesien, the highest association football league in the Gauliga from 1941 to 1945
