= Oberpräsident =

Highest administrative official in the Prussian provinces

The Oberpräsident (Supreme President) was the highest administrative official in the Prussian provinces of the German Empire.

== History ==
Until the German Revolution of 1918, the Oberpräsident was the Prussian Crown's supreme representative in a Prussian province. In the 17th and 18th centuries, he was appointed by the prince-elector (later the King), and answered only to him.

From 1808 and 1815, the Oberpräsident exercised the right of inspection, as well as supreme supervision of provincial administration on behalf of the king. However, he was not in charge of the district president, who instead was subordinate to the Prussian Ministry of the Interior directly. The Oberpräsident had the right to be informed by the district presidents about all aspects of the province, could take in all administrative procedures insight, and was allowed to intervene in case of problems.

The office was maintained in the Free State of Prussia, established as part of the Weimar Republic.

Under the Third Reich, the powers of the Oberpräsident were extended. They then were also responsible for Reich interests, similar to the powers of a Reichsstatthalter.
