= Martin Adolf Bormann =

German theologian and laicized Catholic priest

- Born: Martin Adolf Bormann; 14 April 1930; Grünwald, Bavaria, Germany
- Died: 11 March 2013 (aged 82); Herdecke, Germany
- Occupations: Theologian and priest
- Spouse: Cordula (m. 1971)
- Father: Martin Bormann
- Relatives: Walter Buch (grandfather)

Ecclesiastical career
- Religion: Catholic
- Ordained: 26 July 1958
- Laicized: Yes

Martin Adolf Bormann (14 April 1930 – 11 March 2013) was a German theologian and laicized Catholic priest. He was the eldest of the ten children of Martin Bormann.

== Early life ==
Bormann was born in the southern Munich suburb of Grünwald, Bavaria, the eldest of the ten children of the head of the Nazi Party Chancellery and private secretary to Adolf Hitler, Martin Bormann (1900–1945) and his wife, Gerda Buch (1909–1946). He was baptised in the German Evangelical Church with Adolf Hitler as his godfather. His parents did not baptise some of their subsequent children on account of their hostility to Christianity and did not raise their children religiously. Nicknamed Krönzi, a hypocoristic form of Kronprinz (German for 'crown prince'), he was an ardent young Nazi, attending the Nazi Party Academy of Matrei am Brenner in the Tyrol from 1940 to 1945.

On 15 April 1945, the school closed and young Martin was advised by a party functionary in Munich, named Hummel, to try to reach his mother in the still German-occupied hamlet of Val Gardena/Gröden, near Selva/Wolkenstein in Italian South Tyrol. Unable to get there, he found himself stranded in Salzburg, where the Gauleiter provided him with false identity papers and he found hospitality with a Catholic farmer, Nikolaus Hohenwarter, at the Querleitnerhof, halfway up a mountain in the Salzburg Alps.

== Post-war ==
After Germany surrendered, his mother Gerda was subjected to intense interrogation by officers of the CIC (Combined Intelligence Committee, the joint American-British intelligence body). She died of abdominal cancer in the prison hospital at Merano on 23 March 1946. The following year, he learned of his mother's death from an article in the Salzburger Nachrichten and only then confessed his true identity to Hohenwarter, who reported the information to his local priest at Weißbach bei Lofer. Subsequently, the priest advised the rector of the Church of Maria Kirchtal, who then took the boy into his care.

Young Martin converted to Catholicism. While serving as an altar boy at Maria Kirchtal, he was arrested by American intelligence officers and imprisoned at Zell am See for several days of interrogation before being returned to his parish. He stayed there until he joined the religious congregation of the Missionaries of the Sacred Heart in Ingolstadt. He had been able to resume contact with his brothers and sisters, all of whom, except for one sister, had also been received into the Catholic Church.

=== Life as a priest ===
On 26 July 1958, he was ordained a priest. In 1961, he was sent to the newly independent Congo (formerly the Belgian Congo), where he worked as a missionary until 1964, when he had to flee the country due to the Simba rebellion. In 1966, he returned to the Congo for a year.

=== Life after the priesthood ===
After a near-fatal injury in 1969, Bormann was nursed back to health by a nun named Cordula. He left the priesthood in the early 1970s, and they later both renounced their vows and wed in 1971. They had no children.

Bormann became a teacher of theology and retired in 1992. In 2001, he toured schools in Germany and Austria, speaking about the horrors of the Third Reich, and even visited Israel, meeting with Holocaust survivors.

In 2011, Bormann was accused by a former pupil at an Austrian Catholic boarding school of having raped him as a 12-year-old when Bormann was working there as a priest and schoolmaster in the early 1960s. Other former pupils alleged severe physical violence had been used against them and others. By this point, Bormann was suffering from dementia and was unwilling to and/or incapable of commenting on the accusations. No legal proceedings followed, but the independent Klasnic Commission, established to investigate abuse by Catholic Church members in Austria, awarded the accuser compensation.

Bormann died in 2013 in Herdecke, North Rhine-Westphalia, Germany.
