= Albert Leo Schlageter =

Imperial German Army officer (1894–1923)

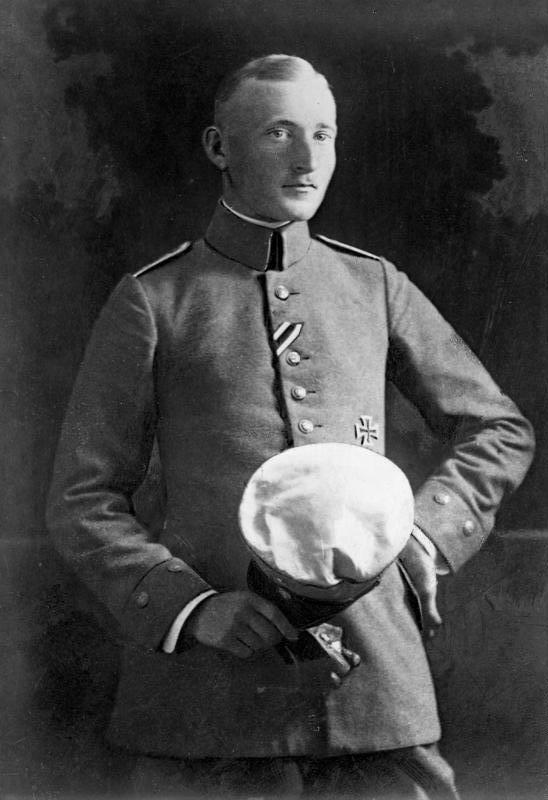
- Albert Leo Schlageter, 1918
- Born: August 12, 1894; Schönau im Schwarzwald, Grand Duchy of Baden, German Empire
- Died: May 26, 1923 (aged 28); Golzheim, Rhine Province
- Cause of death: Execution by firing squad
- Military career
- Allegiance: German Empire
- Branch: Imperial German Army
- Rank: Leutnant
- Conflicts: World War I: Second battle of Ypres; Battle of the Somme; Battle of Verdun; Latvian War of Independence; Kapp Putsch; Silesian Uprisings

Albert Leo Schlageter (German pronunciation: [ˈalbɛʁt ˈleːo ˈʃlaːɡɛtɐ]; August 12, 1894 – May 26, 1923) was an Imperial German Army officer who served in World War I before joining several Freikorps groups and carrying out acts of sabotage against French occupational forces in the Ruhr. Schlageter was arrested by French forces for sabotaging railroad tracks and executed by firing squad in 1923. After his death, he was viewed by many German nationalists as a martyr, including the Nazi Party. In Nazi Germany, Schlageter was commemorated as a national hero, which in turn led Allied occupational authorities to target such commemoration after World War II as part of the denazification process.

== Life ==
Schlageter was born in Schönau im Schwarzwald to Catholic parents.

After the outbreak of the First World War, Schlageter became a voluntary emergency worker for the military. During the war, he participated in several battles, notably Ypres (1915), the Somme (1916) and Verdun, earning the Iron Cross second class. Following his promotion to leutnant, he took part in the Third Battle of Ypres (1917) and earned the Iron Cross first class in 1918. After the war and his dismissal from the greatly reduced army, Schlageter described himself as a student of political sciences, but he studied the subject at Freiburg im Breisgau at the most for one year.

About this time, Schlageter became a member of a right-wing student group. Soon, in March 1919, he joined the Baden Freikorps and fought against the Bolsheviks as a part of Walter von Medem's Baltic Freikorps during the capture of Riga in May during the Latvian War of Independence. After the Landwehr was defeated in the Battle of Cēsis, he joined the German Legion of the West Russian Volunteer Army led by Pavel Bermondt-Avalov. In December 1919, after Avalov's forces were defeated by the Latvian Army and after a short time in Lithuania, Schlageter returned to Germany.

In 1920, Schlageter took part in the Kapp Putsch and some of the battles between the military and communist factions that were convulsing Germany. His unit also took part in the Silesian Uprisings fighting on the German side. During the Third Silesian Uprising he commanded a company in the assault battalion (Sturmbataillon) „Heinz" of Karl G.O. Hauenstein's volunteer corps.

Already close to Nazis, around the time of the Battle of Annaberg of 1921 Schlageter's unit merged with the emerging Nazi Party. During the Third Silesian Uprising of 1921, Schlageter became infamous for persecuting local people and for terrorist actions against both Poles and Germans whom he and his group perceived as opposing his cause. On October 31, 1921 he participated in the murder of the parish priest Augustyn Strzybny in Modzurów. He was a founding member of the Greater German Workers' Party, a front organization for the Nazi Party.

Following the French occupation of the Ruhr in 1923, Schlageter led a group of nationalists in sabotage operations against the occupying force. The group managed to derail a number of trains. On April 7, 1923, information on Schlageter and his activities was obtained by the French, and he was arrested the following day. Tried by court-martial on May 7, 1923, he was condemned to death. On the morning of May 26, Schlageter was executed by firing squad on the Golzheimer heath near Düsseldorf.

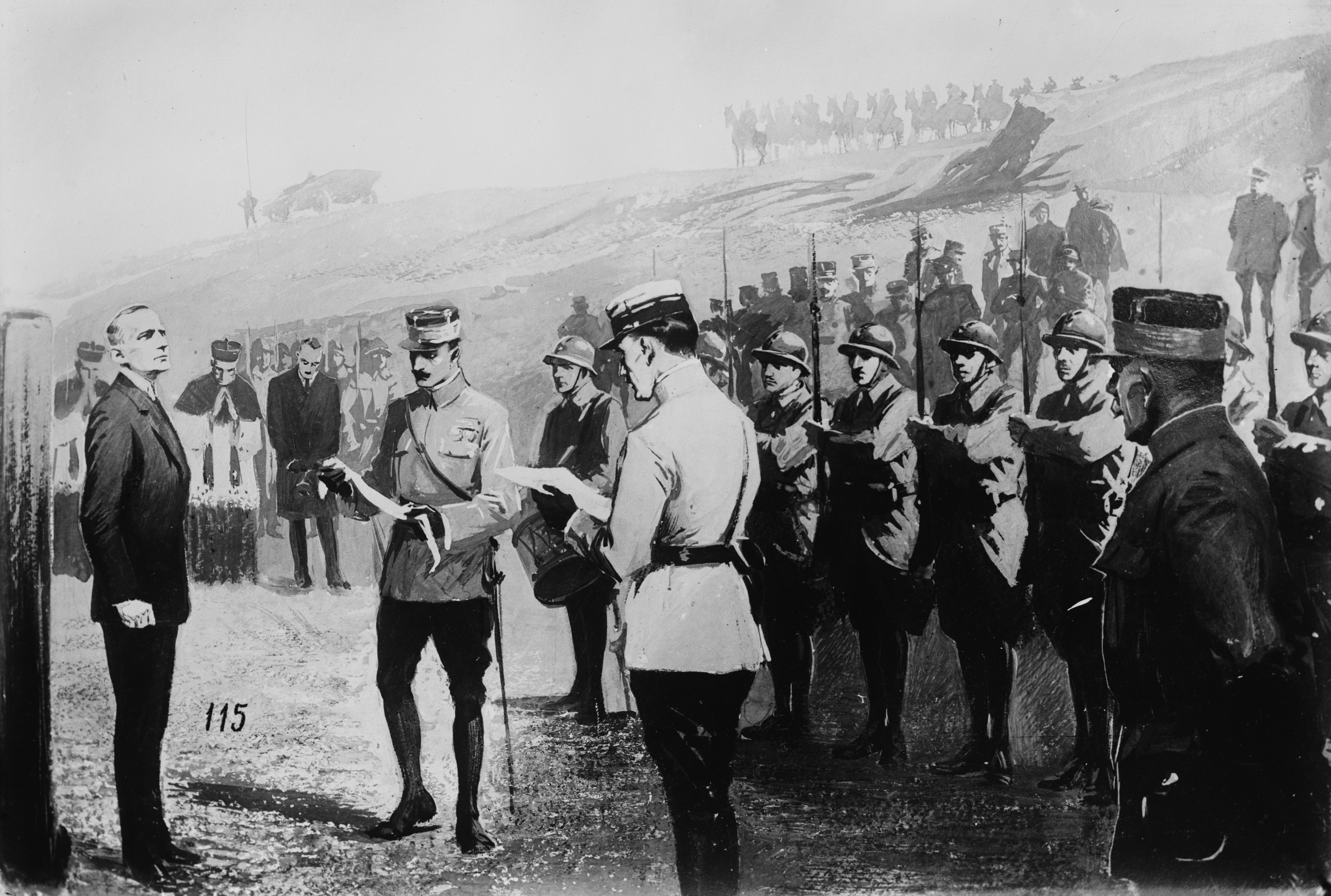
Schlageter facing the firing squad

On May 8, Schlageter had written to his parents: "from 1914 until today I have sacrificed my whole strength to work for my German homeland, from love and pure loyalty. Where it was suffering, it drew me, in order to help... I was no gang leader, but in quiet labour I sought to help my fatherland. I did not commit any common crime or murder."

Almost immediately after Schlageter's execution, Rudolf Höss murdered his alleged betrayer, Walther Kadow. He was assisted by Martin Bormann. Höss was sentenced to ten years in prison; Bormann received a one-year sentence. Höss was released from prison under a general amnesty in July 1928.

== Heroic symbol to Nazism ==
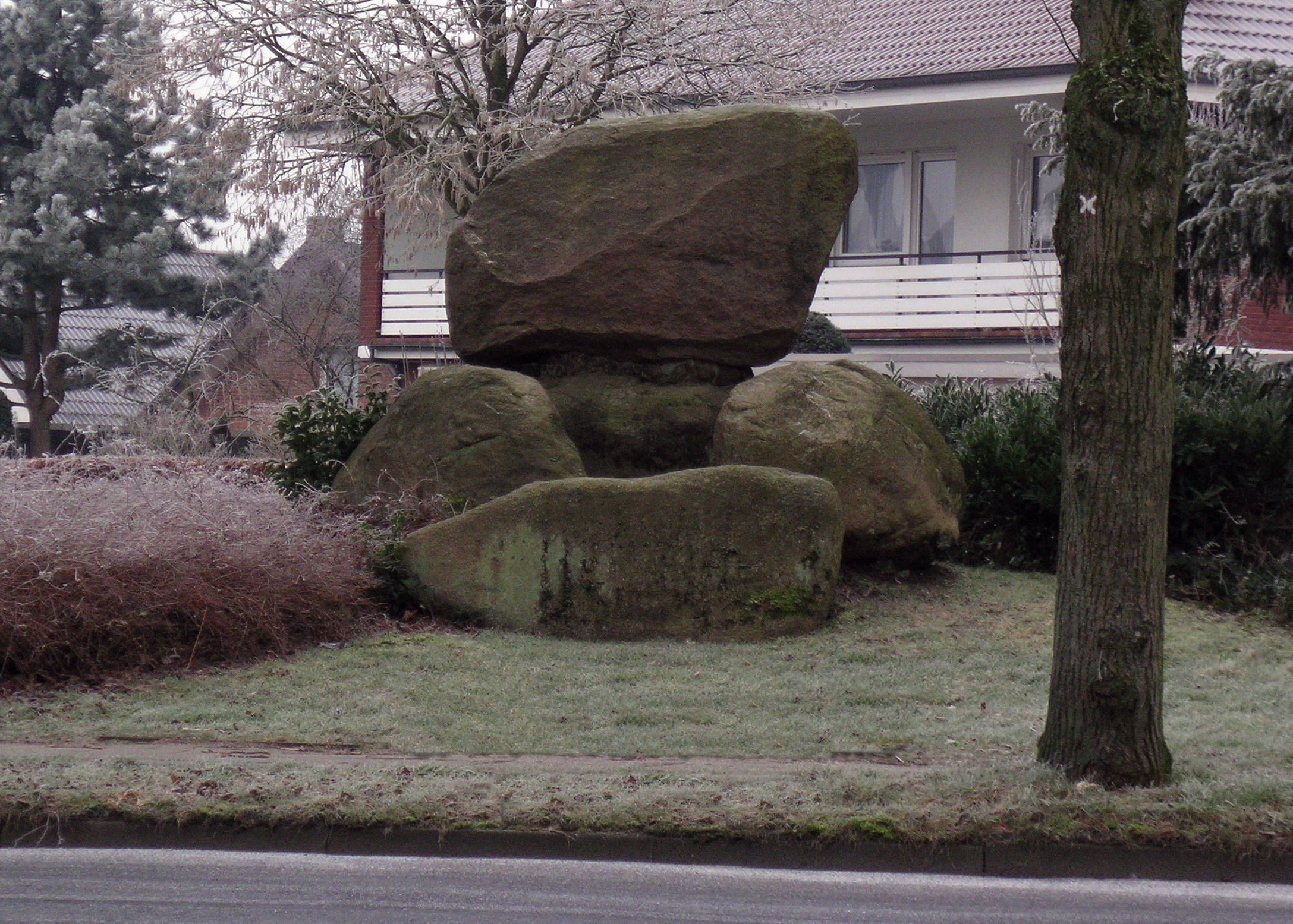
Schlageter memorial in Billerbeck. The inscription was removed after the war.

After his execution he became a hero to some sections of the German population. Immediately after his death a Schlageter Memorial Society was formed, which agitated for the creation of a monument to honour him. The German Communist Party sought to debunk the emerging mythology of Schlageter by circulating a speech by Karl Radek portraying him as an honourable but misguided figure. It was the Nazi Party who most fully exploited the Schlageter story. Hitler refers to him in Mein Kampf. Rituals were constructed to commemorate his death, and in 1931 the Memorial Society succeeded in getting a monument erected near the site of his execution. This was a giant cross placed amid sunken stone rings. Other smaller memorials were also created.

After 1933 Schlageter became one of the principal heroes of the Nazi regime, along with Horst Wessel, a Nazi stormtrooper who had been killed in Berlin in 1930.

In June 1933, Nazis from the Passau region gathered at the Dreisessel Mountain in the Bavaria Forest to dedicate a Schlageter Memorial. In September 1933, the city of Passau dedicated its own memorial on Hammerberg, overlooking the Inn River. In the spring of 1938, Passau added a Schlageter street and a Schlageter Plaza.

The Nazis renamed the Haus der Technik in Königsberg the Schlageterhaus. Hanns Johst, the Nazi playwright, wrote Schlageter (1933), a biographical drama. It was dedicated to Hitler, and was performed on his first anniversary in power as a theatrical manifesto of Nazism. The line "when I hear the word culture, I reach for my gun", often misattributed to Nazi leaders, derives from this play. The original line is slightly different: "Wenn ich Kultur höre ... entsichere ich meinen Browning," "Whenever I hear of culture... I release the safety-catch of my Browning!" (Act 1, Scene 1). It is spoken by another character in conversation with the young Schlageter.

Several important military ventures were also named for him, including the Jagdgeschwader 26 Schlageter fighter-wing of the Luftwaffe, and the naval vessel Albert Leo Schlageter. His name was also given as a title to two SA groups, the SA-Standarte 39 Schlageter at Düsseldorf and SA-Standarte 142 Albert Leo Schlageter at Lörrach. An army barracks on the south side of Freiburg was also named after him; after World War II, the site of this barracks was occupied by the French army and renamed Quartier Vauban after the French military architect. When the French left in the 1990s, the area became the site of the eco-friendly suburb of Vauban.

Schlageter also featured as a prominent character in British author Geoffrey Moss's 1933 novel I Face the Stars, about the rise of Nazism.

After the war, the main Schlageter memorial was destroyed by occupying Allied forces as part of the denazification process. The Schlageter memorial in Ringelai near Freyung, however, existed until 1977.

The Schlageterinsel or "Schlageter Island" near Soltau continues to bear the name.
