= Martin Bormann =

German Nazi politician (1900–1945)

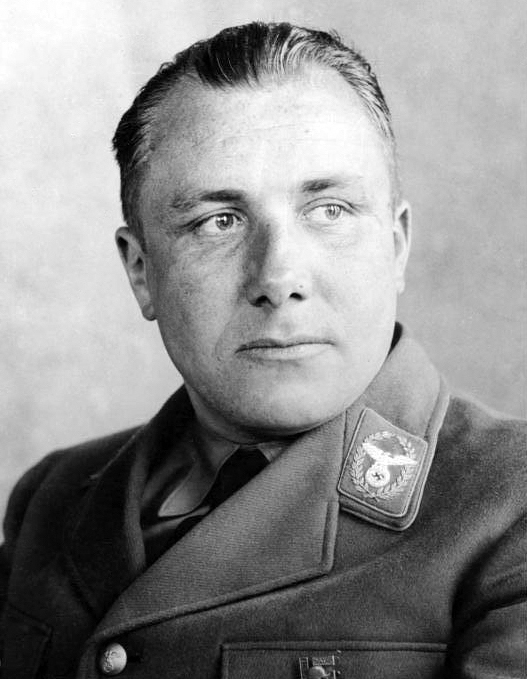
- Bormann in 1934 (Note: A scar on his forehead has been edited out of the photograph.)

Party Minister of the Nazi Party
- In office 30 April 1945 – 2 May 1945
- President: Karl Dönitz
- Chancellors: Joseph Goebbels (Note: as Chancellor); Lutz von Krosigk (Note: de facto Chancellor of Germany (formally known as "Leading Minister"))
- Preceded by: Adolf Hitler (as Führer)
- Succeeded by: Office abolished

Personal Secretary to the Führer
- In office 12 April 1943 – 30 April 1945
- Führer: Adolf Hitler
- Preceded by: Himself (as Private Secretary to the Führer)
- Succeeded by: Office abolished

Chief of the Party Chancellery
- In office 12 May 1941 – 2 May 1945
- Deputy: Gerhard Klopfer
- Preceded by: Rudolf Hess (as Deputy Führer)
- Succeeded by: Office abolished

Chief of Staff of the Deputy Führer
- In office 1 July 1933 – 12 May 1941
- Deputy Führer: Rudolf Hess

Additional positions
- January–August 1943: Member of the "Committee of Three"
- 1941–1945: Reichsminister without portfolio
- 1933–1945: Member of the Greater German Reichstag
- 1933–1945: Reichsleiter of the Nazi Party
- 1933–1945: Manager of the Adolf Hitler Fund of German Trade and Industry

Personal details
- Born: Martin Ludwig Bormann; 17 June 1900 Wegeleben, Germany
- Died: 2 May 1945 (aged 44) Berlin, Germany
- Cause of death: Suicide by hydrogen cyanide
- Party: Nazi Party
- Spouse: Gerda Buch (m. 1929)
- Children: 10, including Martin Adolf Bormann
- Relatives: Walter Buch (father-in-law); Albert Bormann (brother)
- Cabinet: Hitler cabinet Goebbels cabinet
- Nickname: Brown Eminence

Military service
- Branch/service: Imperial German Army; Schutzstaffel
- Years of service: 1918–1919; 1927–1945
- Rank: SS-Obergruppenführer
- Unit: 55th Field Artillery Regiment
- Service number: 278,267 (SS)
- Criminal information
- Status: Released (1925); Deceased before arraignment (1945)
- Convictions: Accomplice to murder (1924); Conspiracy to commit crimes against peace; Crimes of aggression; War crimes; Crimes against humanity
- Trial: Nuremberg trials
- Penalty: 1 year's imprisonment (1924); Death (1946; in absentia)

Martin Ludwig Bormann (17 June 1900 – 2 May 1945) was a German Nazi Party official, head of the Nazi Party Chancellery, and private secretary to Adolf Hitler. Bormann gained immense power by using his position as Hitler's private secretary to control the flow of information and access to Hitler. He used his position to create an extensive bureaucracy and involve himself as much as possible in decision-making.

Born in Wegeleben, Bormann joined a paramilitary Freikorps organisation in 1922 while working as manager of a large estate. He served nearly a year in prison as an accomplice to his friend Rudolf Höss (later commandant of Auschwitz concentration camp) in the murder of school teacher Walther Kadow. Bormann joined the Nazi Party in 1927 and the Schutzstaffel (SS) in 1937. He initially worked in the party's insurance service, and transferred in July 1933 to the office of Deputy Führer Rudolf Hess, where he served as chief of staff.

Bormann gained acceptance into Hitler's inner circle and accompanied him everywhere, providing briefings and summaries of events and requests. He was appointed Hitler's personal secretary on 12 April 1943. After Hess's solo flight to Britain on 10 May 1941 to seek peace negotiations with the British government, Bormann assumed Hess's former duties, with the title of Head of the Parteikanzlei (Party Chancellery). He had final approval over civil service appointments, and helped review and approve legislation. He was a leading proponent of reducing the influence of Christian churches and favoured harsh treatment of Jews and Slavs in the areas conquered by Germany during World War II.

Bormann returned with Hitler to the Führerbunker in Berlin on 16 January 1945 as the Red Army approached the city. After Hitler committed suicide, Bormann and others attempted to flee Berlin on 2 May to avoid capture by the Soviets. Bormann likely committed suicide on a bridge near Lehrter station. His body was buried nearby on 8 May 1945, but remained unfound for decades. The missing Bormann was tried in absentia by the International Military Tribunal in the Nuremberg trials of 1945 and 1946, where he was convicted of war crimes and crimes against humanity and sentenced to death by hanging. Bormann's body was found in 1972 and confirmed as his in 1973; the identification was reaffirmed in 1998 by DNA tests.

== Early life and education ==
Martin Ludwig Bormann was born on 17 June 1900 in Wegeleben (now in Saxony-Anhalt) in the Kingdom of Prussia in the German Empire. Bormann was the son of Theodor Bormann (1862–1903), a post office employee, and his second wife, Antonie Bernhardine Mennong. The family was Lutheran. He had two half-siblings (Else and Walter Bormann) from his father's earlier marriage to Louise Grobler, who died in 1898. Antonie Bormann gave birth to three sons, one of whom died in infancy. Martin and Albert (1902–1989) survived to adulthood. Theodor died when Bormann was three, and his mother soon remarried.

Bormann's studies at an agricultural trade high school were interrupted when he joined the 55th Field Artillery Regiment as a gunner in June 1918, in the final months of World War I. He never saw action, but served garrison duty until February 1919. After working a short time in a cattle feed mill, Bormann became estate manager of a large farm in Mecklenburg. Shortly after starting work at the estate, Bormann joined an antisemitic landowners association. While hyperinflation in the Weimar Republic meant that money was worthless, foodstuffs stored on farms and estates became ever more valuable. Many estates, including Bormann's, had Freikorps units stationed on site to guard the crops from pillaging. Bormann joined Freikorps Roßbach headed by Gerhard Roßbach in 1922, acting as section leader and treasurer.

On 17 March 1924, Bormann was sentenced to a year in Elisabethstrasse Prison as an accomplice to his friend Rudolf Höss in the murder of Walther Kadow. The perpetrators believed Kadow had tipped off the French occupation authorities in the Ruhr District that fellow Freikorps member Albert Leo Schlageter was carrying out sabotage operations against French industries. Schlageter was arrested and was executed on 26 May 1923. On the night of 31 May, Höss, Bormann and several others took Kadow into a meadow out of town, where he was beaten and had his throat cut. After one of the perpetrators confessed, police dug up the body and laid charges in July. Bormann was released from prison in February 1925. (Note: Höss, who later served as commandant of Auschwitz concentration camp, was sentenced to ten years. He was released in 1928 as part of a general amnesty.) He joined the Frontbann, a short-lived Nazi Party paramilitary organisation created to replace the Sturmabteilung (SA; storm detachment or assault division), which had been banned in the aftermath of the failed Munich Putsch. Bormann returned to his job at Mecklenburg and remained there until May 1926, when he moved in with his mother in Oberweimar.

== Career in the Nazi Party ==
In 1927, Bormann joined the Nazi Party. His membership number was 60,508. He joined the Schutzstaffel (SS) on 1 January 1937 with number 278,267. By special order of Heinrich Himmler in 1938, Bormann was granted SS number 555 to reflect his Alter Kämpfer (Old Fighter) status.

=== Early career ===
Bormann took a job with Der Nationalsozialist, a weekly paper edited by Nazi Party member Hans Severus Ziegler, who was deputy Gauleiter (party leader) for Thuringia. After joining the Nazi Party in 1927, Bormann began duties as regional press officer, but his lack of public-speaking skills made him ill-suited to this position. He soon put his organisational skills to use as business manager for the Gau (region).

In October 1928, Bormann moved to Munich where he worked in the SA insurance office. Initially the Nazi Party provided coverage through insurance companies for members who were hurt or killed in the frequent violent skirmishes with members of other political parties. As insurance companies were unwilling to pay out claims for such activities, in 1930 Bormann set up the Hilfskasse der NSDAP (Nazi Party Auxiliary Fund), a benefits and relief fund directly administered by the party. Each party member was required to pay premiums and might receive compensation for injuries sustained while conducting party business. Payments out of the fund were made solely at Bormann's discretion. He began to gain a reputation as a financial expert, and many party members felt personally indebted to him after receiving benefits from the fund. In addition to its stated purpose, the fund was used as a last-resort source of funding for the Nazi Party, which was chronically short of money at that time. After the Nazi Party's success in the 1930 general election, where they won 107 seats, party membership grew dramatically. By 1932 the fund was collecting 3 million ℛ︁ℳ︁ per year.

Bormann also worked on the staff of the SA from 1928 to 1930, and while there he founded the National Socialist Automobile Corps, precursor to the National Socialist Motor Corps. The organisation was responsible for co-ordinating the donated use of motor vehicles belonging to party members, and later expanded to training members in automotive skills.

=== Reichsleiter and head of the party chancellery ===
After the Machtergreifung (Nazi Party seizure of power) in January 1933, the relief fund was repurposed to provide general accident and property insurance, so Bormann resigned from its administration. He applied for a transfer and was accepted as chief of staff in the office of Rudolf Hess, the Deputy Führer, on 1 July 1933. Bormann also served as personal secretary to Hess from July 1933 until 12 May 1941. Hess's department was responsible for settling disputes within the party and acted as an intermediary between the party and the state regarding policy decisions and legislation. (Note: In practice, this requirement was usually circumvented.) Bormann used his position to create an extensive bureaucracy and involve himself in as much of the decision-making as possible. On 10 October 1933 Hitler named Bormann Reichsleiter (national leader – the second highest political rank) of the Nazi Party. At the November 1933 parliamentary election, Bormann was elected as a Reichstag deputy from electoral constituency 5 (Frankfurt an der Oder); he was reelected in 1936 and 1938. By June 1934, Bormann was gaining acceptance into Hitler's inner circle and accompanied him everywhere, providing briefings and summaries of events and requests.

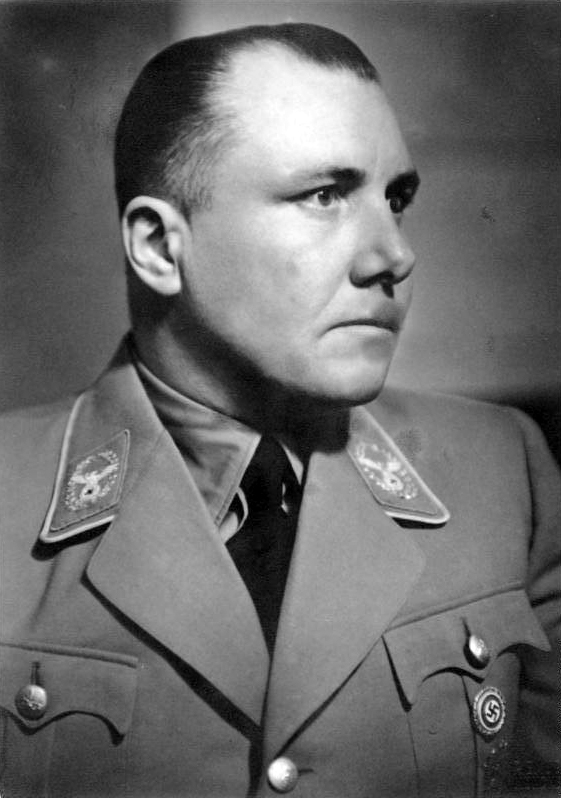
Bormann in 1939

In 1935, Bormann was appointed as overseer of renovations at the Berghof, Hitler's property at Obersalzberg. In the early 1930s, Hitler bought the property, which he had been renting since 1925 as a vacation retreat. After he became chancellor, Hitler drew up plans for expansion and remodelling of the main house and put Bormann in charge of construction. Bormann commissioned the construction of barracks for the SS guards, roads and footpaths, garages for motor vehicles, a guesthouse, accommodation for staff, and other amenities. Retaining title in his own name, Bormann bought up adjacent farms until the entire complex covered 10 square kilometres (3.9 sq mi). Members of the inner circle built houses within the perimeter, beginning with Hermann Göring, Albert Speer, and Bormann himself. (Note: The Bormann family also had a house in the Munich suburb of Pullach.) Bormann commissioned the building of the Kehlsteinhaus (Eagle's Nest), a tea house high above the Berghof, as a gift to Hitler on his fiftieth birthday (20 April 1939). Hitler seldom used the building, but Bormann liked to impress guests by taking them there.

While Hitler was in residence at the Berghof, Bormann was constantly in attendance and acted as Hitler's personal secretary. In this capacity, he began to control the flow of information and access to Hitler. During this period, Hitler gave Bormann control of his personal finances. In addition to salaries as chancellor and president, Hitler's income included money raised through royalties collected on his book Mein Kampf and the use of his image on postage stamps. Bormann set up the Adolf Hitler Fund of German Trade and Industry, which collected money from German industrialists on Hitler's behalf. Some of the funds received through this programme were disbursed to various party leaders, but Bormann retained most of it for Hitler's personal use. Bormann and others took notes of Hitler's thoughts expressed over dinner and in monologues late into the night and preserved them. The material was published after the war as Hitler's Table Talk. Historian Mikael Nilsson contends that Bormann (along with Henry Picker and Heinrich Heim, who transcribed the material) distorted the table talks so that the content would be useful to help him win disagreements within the Nazi leadership. Picker noted Bormann would make him insert fictitious statements, and that Bormann wanted their notes to fit in with his own fight against the churches. Nilsson notes that Bormann seemed willing to pursue his anti-Christian stance behind Hitler's back.

The office of the Deputy Führer had final approval over civil service appointments, and Bormann reviewed the personnel files and made the decisions regarding appointments. This power impinged on the purview of Minister of the Interior Wilhelm Frick, and was an example of the overlapping responsibilities typical of the Nazi regime. Bormann travelled everywhere with Hitler, including trips to Austria in 1938 after the Anschluss (the annexation of Austria into Nazi Germany), and to the Sudetenland after the signing of the Munich Agreement later that year. Bormann was placed in charge of organising the 1938 Nuremberg Rally, a major annual party event.

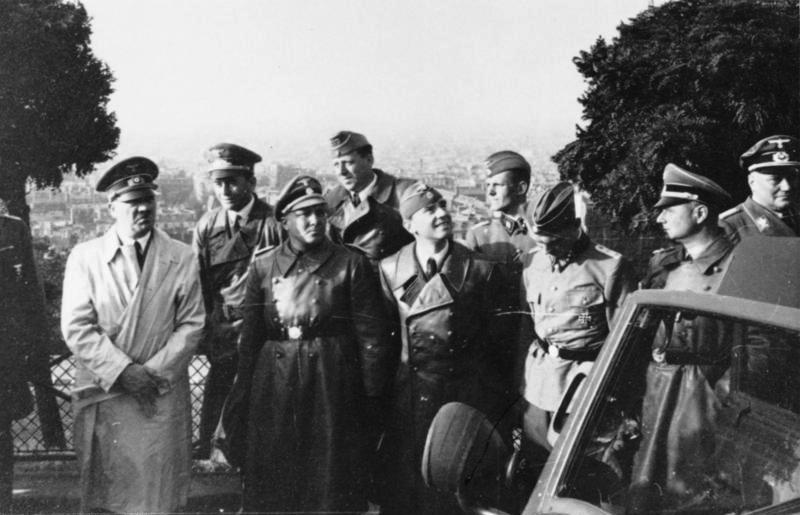
Bormann (in front beside Hitler) in Paris, June 1940

Hitler intentionally played top party members against one another and the Nazi Party against the civil service. In this way, he fostered distrust, competition, and infighting among his subordinates to consolidate and maximise his own power. He typically did not give written orders; instead he communicated with them verbally or had them conveyed through Bormann. Falling out of favour with Bormann meant that access to Hitler was cut off. Bormann proved to be a master of intricate political infighting. Along with his ability to control access to Hitler, this enabled him to curtail the power of Joseph Goebbels, Göring, Himmler, Alfred Rosenberg, Robert Ley, Hans Frank, Speer, and other high-ranking officials, many of whom became his enemies. This ruthless and continuous infighting for power, influence, and Hitler's favour came to characterise the inner workings of the Third Reich.

As World War II progressed, Hitler's attention became focused on foreign affairs and the conduct of the war to the exclusion of all else. Hess, not directly engaged in either of these endeavours, became increasingly sidelined from the affairs of the nation and from Hitler's attention; Bormann had successfully supplanted Hess in many of his duties and usurped his position at Hitler's side. Hess was concerned that Germany would face a war on two fronts as plans progressed for Operation Barbarossa, the invasion of the Soviet Union scheduled to take place later that year. He flew solo to Britain on 10 May 1941 to seek peace negotiations with the British government. He was arrested on arrival and spent the rest of the war as a British prisoner, eventually receiving a life sentence – for crimes against peace (planning and preparing a war of aggression), and conspiracy with other German leaders to commit crimes – at the Nuremberg trials in 1946. Speer later said Hitler described Hess's departure as one of the worst blows of his life, as he considered it a personal betrayal. Hitler ordered Hess to be shot should he return to Germany and abolished the post of Deputy Führer on 12 May 1941, assigning Hess's former duties to Bormann, with the title of Head of the Parteikanzlei (Party Chancellery). In this position he was responsible for all Nazi Party appointments, and was answerable only to Hitler. By a Führer decree (Führererlass) on 29 May, Bormann also succeeded Hess on the six-member Council of Ministers for Defense of the Reich, which operated as a war cabinet. He simultaneously was awarded cabinet rank equivalent to a Reichsminister without portfolio. Associates began to refer to him as the "Brown Eminence", although never to his face. (Note: German: der brauner Schatten. The term is a reference to Cardinal Richelieu (termed the "Red Eminence"), the power behind the throne in the court of Louis XIII.)

Bormann's power and effective reach broadened considerably during the war. By early 1943, the war produced a labour crisis for the regime. Hitler created a three-man committee with representatives of the State, the army, and the Party in an attempt to centralise control of the war economy. The committee members were Hans Lammers (head of the Reich Chancellery), Field Marshal Wilhelm Keitel, chief of the Oberkommando der Wehrmacht (Armed Forces High Command; OKW), and Bormann, who controlled the Party. The committee was intended to independently propose measures regardless of the wishes of various ministries, with Hitler reserving most final decisions to himself. The committee, soon known as the Dreierausschuß (Committee of Three), met eleven times between January and August 1943. However, they ran up against resistance from Hitler's cabinet ministers, who headed deeply entrenched spheres of influence and were excluded from the committee. Seeing it as a threat to their power, Goebbels, Göring, and Speer worked together to bring it down. The result was that nothing changed, and the Committee of Three declined into irrelevance.

=== Role in Kirchenkampf ===
Article 24 of the National Socialist Program, issued in 1920, advocated for positive Christianity, and a Reichskonkordat (Reich Concordat) treaty with the Vatican was signed in 1933, purporting to guarantee religious freedom for Catholics. But many Nazis believed that Christianity was fundamentally incompatible with Nazism. Bormann, who was strongly anti-Christian, agreed. Historian Alan Bullock comments that out of political expediency, Hitler intended to postpone the elimination of the Christian churches until after the war, but his repeated hostile statements against the church indicated to his subordinates that a continuation of the Kirchenkampf (church struggle) would be tolerated and even encouraged.

Bormann was one of the leading proponents of the ongoing campaign against the Christian churches. Speer notes in his memoirs that while drafting plans for Welthauptstadt Germania, the planned rebuilding of Berlin, he was told by Bormann that churches were not to be allocated any building sites. As part of the campaign against the Catholic Church, hundreds of monasteries in Germany and Austria were confiscated by the Gestapo and their occupants were expelled. In 1941, the Catholic Bishop of Münster, Clemens August Graf von Galen, publicly protested against this persecution and against Action T4, the Nazi involuntary euthanasia programme under which the mentally ill, physically deformed, and incurably sick were to be killed. In a series of sermons that received international attention, he criticised the programme as illegal and immoral. His sermons led to a widespread protest movement among church leaders, the strongest protest against a Nazi policy up until that point. Bormann and others called for Galen to be hanged, but Hitler and Goebbels concluded that Galen's death would only be viewed as a martyrdom and lead to further unrest. Hitler decided to deal with the issue when the war was over.

George Mosse wrote of Bormann's beliefs:

[He believed that] God is present, but as a world-force which presides over the laws of life which the Nazis alone have understood. This non-Christian theism, tied to Nordic blood, was current in Germany long before Bormann wrote down his own thoughts on the matter. It must now be restored, and the catastrophic mistakes of the past centuries, which had put the power of the state into the hands of the Church, must be avoided. The Gauleiters are advised to conquer the influence of the Christian Churches by keeping them divided, encouraging particularism among them...

Richard Overy describes Bormann as an atheist.

=== Personal Secretary to the Führer ===
Preoccupied with military matters and spending most of his time at his military headquarters on the eastern front, Hitler came to rely more and more on Bormann to handle the domestic policies of the country. On 12 April 1943, Hitler officially appointed Bormann as Personal Secretary to the Führer. Speer described Bormann as having de facto control over all domestic matters, and this new appointment gave him the power to act in an official capacity in any matter. Historian Jonathan Petropoulos notes that all Führer decrees were routed through Lammers at the Reich Chancellery, where state affairs were handled.

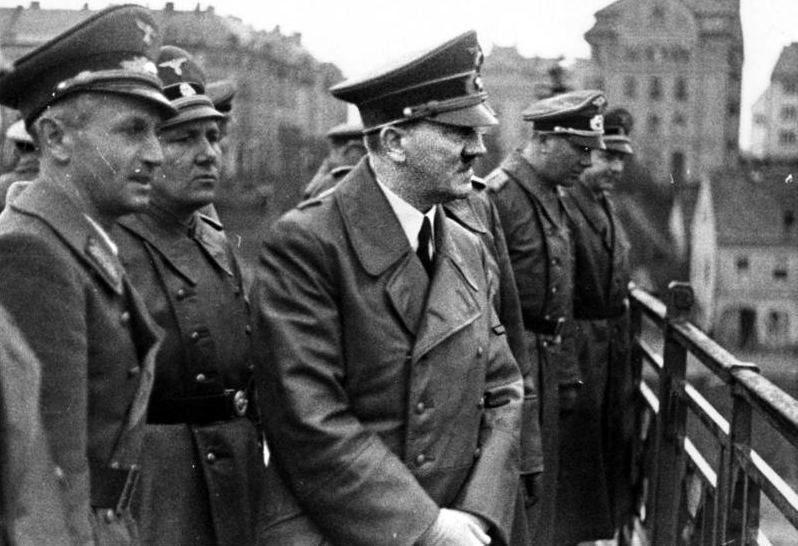
Bormann (behind and to Hitler's right) on the Old Bridge, Maribor, Yugoslavia, April 1941 (now Maribor, Slovenia)

Bormann was invariably the advocate of extremely harsh, radical measures when it came to the treatment of Jews, the conquered eastern peoples, and prisoners of war. He signed the decree of 31 May 1941 extending the 1935 Nuremberg Laws to the annexed territories of the East. Thereafter, he signed the decree of 9 October 1942 prescribing that the permanent Final Solution in Greater Germany could no longer be solved by emigration, but only by the use of "ruthless force in the special camps of the East", that is, extermination in Nazi death camps. A further decree, signed by Bormann on 1 July 1943, gave Adolf Eichmann absolute powers over Jews, who now came under the exclusive jurisdiction of the Gestapo. Historian Richard J. Evans estimates that 5.5 to 6 million Jews, representing two-thirds of the Jewish population of Europe, were exterminated by the Nazi regime in the course of The Holocaust.

Knowing Hitler viewed the Slavs as inferior, Bormann opposed the introduction of German criminal law into the conquered eastern territories. He lobbied for and eventually achieved a strict separate penal code that implemented martial law for the Polish and Jewish inhabitants of these areas. The "Edict on Criminal Law Practices against Poles and Jews in the Incorporated Eastern Territories", promulgated 4 December 1941, permitted corporal punishment and death sentences for even the most trivial of offences.

Bormann supported the hard-line approach of Erich Koch, Reichskommissar in Reichskommissariat Ukraine, in his brutal treatment of Slavic people. Alfred Rosenberg, serving as head of the Reich Ministry for the Occupied Eastern Territories, favoured a more moderate policy. After touring collective farms around Vinnytsia, Ukraine, Bormann was concerned about the health and good physical constitution of the population, as he was concerned that they could constitute a danger to the regime. After discussion with Hitler, he issued a policy directive to Rosenberg that read in part:

The Slavs are to work for us. In so far as we don't need them, they may die. The fertility of the Slavs is undesirable. As to food, they are to not get more than necessary. We are the masters; we come first.

Bormann and Himmler shared responsibility (Note: Bormann was in charge of organisation and Himmler looked after providing training and equipment.) for the Volkssturm (people's militia), which drafted all remaining able-bodied men aged 16 to 60 into a last-ditch militia founded on 18 October 1944. Poorly equipped and trained, the men were sent to fight on the eastern front, where nearly 175,000 of them were killed without having any discernible impact on the Soviet advance.

In early 1945, Bormann edited the Bormann dictations of supposed remarks made by Hitler to Bormann; the authenticity as well as the degree of editing applied by Bormann to Hitler's original remarks are disputed among historians.

=== Last days in Berlin ===
On 16 January 1945, Hitler transferred his headquarters to the Führerbunker ("Leader's bunker") in Berlin, where he (along with Bormann, Bormann's secretary Else Krüger, and others) remained until the end of April. The Führerbunker was located under the Reich Chancellery garden in the government district of the city centre. The Battle of Berlin, the final major Soviet offensive of the war, began on 16 April 1945. By 19 April, the Red Army started to encircle the city. On 20 April, his 56th birthday, Hitler made his last trip above ground. In the ruined garden of the Reich Chancellery, he awarded Iron Crosses to boy soldiers of the Hitler Youth. That afternoon, Berlin was bombarded by Soviet artillery for the first time. On 23 April, Albert Bormann left the bunker complex and flew to the Obersalzberg. He and several others had been ordered by Hitler to leave Berlin.

In the early morning hours of 29 April 1945, Wilhelm Burgdorf, Goebbels, Hans Krebs and Bormann witnessed and signed Hitler's last will and testament. In the will, Hitler described Bormann as "my most faithful Party comrade" and named him executor of the estate. That same night Hitler married Eva Braun in a civil ceremony.

As Soviet forces continued to fight their way into the centre of Berlin, Hitler and Braun committed suicide on the afternoon of 30 April. Braun took cyanide and Hitler shot himself. Pursuant to Hitler's instructions, their bodies were carried up to the Reich Chancellery garden and burned. In accordance with Hitler's last wishes, Bormann was named as Party Minister, thus officially confirming that he held the top position in the Party. Grand Admiral Karl Dönitz was appointed as the new Reichspräsident (President of Germany) and Goebbels became head of government and Chancellor of Germany. Hitler did not name any successor to the title Führer. Goebbels and his wife Magda committed suicide the next day.

The Battle in Berlin ended when General der Artillerie Helmuth Weidling, commander of the Berlin Defence Area, unconditionally surrendered the city to General Vasily Chuikov, commander of the Soviet 8th Guards Army on 2 May.

== Death, rumours of survival and discovery of remains ==
1 October 1946 newsreel of Nuremberg trials sentencing

Although eyewitnesses reported Bormann's death in Berlin in early May 1945, his body was not initially discovered, leading to his trial being held in absentia. After some rumours of his escape, including to South America, his remains were found in Berlin in 1972 and identified the following year.

=== Axmann's account of Bormann's death ===
At around 11:00 pm on 1 May 1945, Bormann left the Führerbunker with SS doctor Ludwig Stumpfegger, Hitler Youth leader Artur Axmann, and Hitler's pilot Hans Baur, part of one of the groups attempting to break out of the Soviet encirclement. Bormann carried with him a copy of Hitler's last will and testament. The group left the Führerbunker and travelled on foot via an U-Bahn subway tunnel to the Friedrichstraße station, where they surfaced. Several members of the party attempted to cross the Spree River at the Weidendammer Bridge while crouching behind a Tiger tank. The tank was hit by an anti-tank round and Bormann and Stumpfegger were knocked to the ground. Bormann, Stumpfegger, and several others eventually crossed the river on their third attempt. Bormann, Stumpfegger, and Axmann walked along the railway tracks to Lehrter station, where Axmann decided to leave the others and go in the opposite direction. When he encountered a Red Army patrol, Axmann doubled back. He saw two bodies, which he later identified as Bormann and Stumpfegger, on a bridge near the railway shunting yard. He did not have time to check thoroughly, so he did not know how they died. Since the Soviets did not apparently find Bormann's body, his fate remained in doubt for many years.

=== Tried at Nuremberg in absentia ===
During the chaotic days after the war, contradictory reports arose as to Bormann's whereabouts. Sightings were reported in Argentina, Spain, and elsewhere. Bormann's wife was placed under surveillance in case he tried to contact her. Jakob Glas, Bormann's long-time chauffeur, insisted that he saw Bormann in Munich in July 1946. In case Bormann was still alive, multiple public notices about the upcoming Nuremberg trials were placed in newspapers and on the radio in October and November 1945 to notify him of the proceedings against him.

The trial got under way on 20 November 1945. Lacking evidence confirming Bormann's death, the International Military Tribunal tried him in absentia, as permitted under article 12 of their charter. He was charged with three counts: conspiracy to wage a war of aggression, war crimes, and crimes against humanity. His prosecution was assigned to Lieutenant Thomas F. Lambert Jr. and his defence to Friedrich Bergold. The prosecution stated that Bormann participated in planning and co-signed virtually all of the antisemitic legislation put forward by the regime. Bergold unsuccessfully proposed that the court could not convict Bormann because he was already dead. Due to the shadowy nature of Bormann's activities, Bergold was unable to refute the prosecution's assertions as to the extent of his involvement in decision making. Bormann was convicted of war crimes and crimes against humanity and acquitted of conspiracy to wage a war of aggression. On 1 October 1946, he was sentenced to death by hanging, with the provision that if he were later found alive, any new facts brought to light by that time could be taken into consideration to reduce or overturn the sentence.

=== Discovery of remains ===
Over the following decades, several organisations, including the CIA and West German government, attempted to locate Bormann without success. In 1964, the West German government offered a reward of 100,000 Deutsche Marks (equivalent to approximately €248,000 or US$270,000 in 2023) for information leading to Bormann's capture. Sightings were reported all over the world, including Australia, Denmark, Italy, and South America. In his autobiography, army intelligence officer Reinhard Gehlen claimed that Bormann had been a Soviet spy and had escaped to Moscow. Nazi hunter Simon Wiesenthal believed that Bormann was living in South America. The West German government declared that its hunt for Bormann was over in 1971.

In 1963, a retired postal worker named Albert Krumnow told police that around 8 May 1945, the Soviets had ordered him and his colleagues to bury two bodies found near a railway bridge near Lehrter station (now Berlin Hauptbahnhof). One was dressed in a Wehrmacht uniform and the other was clad only in his underwear. On the second body, Krumnow's colleague, a man named Wagenpfohl, found an SS doctor's paybook identifying him as Ludwig Stumpfegger. Wagenpfohl gave the paybook to his boss, postal chief Berndt, who turned it over to the Soviets. They in turn destroyed it. Wagenpfohl wrote to Stumpfegger's wife on 14 August 1945, informing her that her husband's body was "interred with the bodies of several other dead soldiers in the grounds of the Alpendorf in Berlin NW 40, Invalidenstrasse 63."

Excavations on 20–21 July 1965 at the site specified by Axmann and Krumnow failed to locate the bodies. However, on 7 December 1972, construction workers uncovered human remains near Lehrter station in West Berlin, only 12 m (39 ft) from the spot where Krumnow claimed to have buried them. At the subsequent autopsies, fragments of glass were found in the jaws of both skeletons, suggesting that the men had committed suicide by biting cyanide capsules to avoid capture. Dental records reconstructed from memory in 1945 by Hugo Blaschke identified one skeleton as Bormann's, and damage to the collarbone was consistent with injuries that Bormann's sons reported he had sustained in a riding accident in 1939. Forensic examiners determined that the size of the skeleton and shape of the skull were identical to Bormann's. Likewise, the second skeleton was deemed to be Stumpfegger's, since it was of similar height to his last known proportions. Composite photographs, in which images of the skulls were overlaid on photographs of the men's faces, were completely congruent. Facial reconstruction was undertaken in early 1973 on both skulls to confirm the identities of the bodies. Soon afterward, the West German government declared Bormann dead. Bormann's family was not permitted to cremate the body, in case further forensic examination later proved necessary. The family refused burial and refused to take possession of the remains. The bones were placed in a vault at the Public Prosecutor's Office in Karlsruhe, which was at the time being shared with the Federal Court of Justice.

On 4 May 1998, the remains were conclusively identified as Bormann's after German authorities ordered genetic testing on fragments of the skull. The testing was led by Wolfgang Eisenmenger, Professor of Forensic Science at LMU Munich. Tests using DNA from one of his relatives identified the skull as that of Bormann.

After being released to his family, Bormann's remains were cremated and his ashes were scattered over the Baltic Sea on 16 August 1999. This was done in part to prevent neo-Nazis from using any potential tomb containing Bormann's remains to create a monument.

== Personal life ==
On 2 September 1929, Bormann married 19-year-old Gerda Buch (23 October 1909 – 23 March 1946), whose father, Major Walter Buch, served as a chairman of the Untersuchung und Schlichtungs-Ausschuss (USCHLA; Investigation and Settlement Committee), which was responsible for settling disputes within the party. Hitler was a frequent visitor to the Buch house, and it was here that Bormann met him. Hess and Hitler served as witnesses at his wedding. Bormann also had a series of mistresses, including Manja Behrens, an actress.

Martin and Gerda Bormann had ten children:

- Martin Adolf Bormann (14 April 1930 – 11 March 2013); called Krönzi (short for Kronprinz, "crown prince"); born "Adolf Martin Bormann", named after Hitler, his godfather.
- Ilse Bormann (9 July 1931 – 1958); Her twin sister, Ehrengard, died shortly after birth. Since Ilse was named after her godmother, Ilse Hess, her name was changed to "Eike" after Rudolf Hess's flight to Britain in 1941.
- Irmgard Bormann (born 25 or 28 July 1933)
- Rudolf Gerhard Bormann (born 31 August 1934); named after his godfather Rudolf Hess. His name was changed to "Helmut" after Hess's flight to Britain.
- Heinrich Hugo Bormann (born 13 June 1936); named after his godfather Heinrich Himmler.
- Eva Ute Bormann (born 4 May 1938)
- Gerda Bormann (born 4 August 1940)
- Fritz Hartmut Bormann (born 3 April 1942)
- Volker Bormann (18 September 1943 – 1946)

Gerda Bormann and the children fled Obersalzberg for Italy on 25 April 1945 after an Allied air attack. She died of cancer on 23 March 1946 in Merano, Italy. Bormann's nine remaining children survived the war and were cared for in foster homes. The eldest son, Martin, was ordained a Roman Catholic priest and worked in Africa as a missionary. He later left the priesthood and married.

== Awards and decorations ==
- Frontbann Badge (1932)
- Golden Party Badge (1934)
- Olympic Games Decoration First Class (1936)
- Honour Chevron for the Old Guard
- SS-Honour Ring (1937)
- Honour Sword of the Reichsführer-SS (1937)
- Blood Order (1938)
- Nazi Party Long Service Award in Bronze and Silver
- Grand Officer and Knight of the Grand Cross of the Order of the Crown of Italy

== See also ==
- Glossary of Nazi Germany
- List of Nazi Party leaders and officials
- List SS-Obergruppenführer
- SS-Standartenführer Wilhelm Zander, Bormann's adjutant

== Bibliography ==
- Bartrop, Paul R.; Dickerman, Michael, eds. (2017). The Holocaust: An Encyclopedia and Document Collection. Vol. 1. Sanda Barbara; Denver: ABC-CLIO. ISBN 978-1-4408-4083-8.
- Beevor, Antony (2002). Berlin: The Downfall 1945. New York: Viking-Penguin. ISBN 978-0-670-03041-5.
- "Bormann's body 'identified'". BBC News. 4 May 1998.
- Bullock, Alan (1999) [1952]. Hitler: A Study in Tyranny. New York: Konecky & Konecky. ISBN 978-1-56852-036-0.
- "Datenbank der deutschen Parlamentsabgeordneten, Basis: Parlamentsalmanache/Reichstagshandbücher 1867–1938". Verhandlungen des Deutschen Reichstags.
- Evans, Richard J. (2005). The Third Reich in Power. New York: Penguin Group. ISBN 978-0-14-303790-3.
- Evans, Richard J. (2008). The Third Reich at War. New York: Penguin Group. ISBN 978-0-14-311671-4.
- Fest, Joachim C. (1970). The Face of the Third Reich: Portraits of the Nazi Leadership. New York: Pantheon. ISBN 978-0-394-73407-1.
- Griech-Polelle, Beth A. (2023). Anti-Semitism and the Holocaust: Language, Rhetoric and the Traditions of Hatred. London: Bloomsbury. ISBN 978-1-350-15864-1.
- Hamilton, Charles (1984). Leaders & Personalities of the Third Reich, Vol. 1. San Jose, CA: R. James Bender Publishing. ISBN 0-912138-27-0.
- "Hitler's last days: Preparations for death". Security Service (MI5).
- Joachimsthaler, Anton (1999) [1995]. The Last Days of Hitler: The Legends, the Evidence, the Truth. Trans. Helmut Bögler. London: Brockhampton Press. ISBN 978-1-86019-902-8.
- Karacs, Imre (4 May 1998). "DNA test closes book on mystery of Martin Bormann". The Independent. London: Independent Print Limited.
- Kershaw, Ian (2008). Hitler: A Biography. New York: W.W. Norton & Co. ISBN 978-0-393-06757-6.
- Kershaw, Ian (2016). To Hell and Back: Europe 1914–1949. New York: Penguin Books. ISBN 978-0-14-310992-1.
- Lang, Jochen von (1979). The Secretary. Martin Bormann: The Man Who Manipulated Hitler. New York: Random House. ISBN 978-0-394-50321-9.
- Le Tissier, Tony (2010) [1999]. Race for the Reichstag: The 1945 Battle for Berlin. Barnsley, South Yorkshire: Pen and Sword. ISBN 978-1-84884-230-4.
- Levy, Alan (2006) [1993]. Nazi Hunter: The Wiesenthal File (Revised 2002 ed.). London: Constable & Robinson. ISBN 978-1-84119-607-7.
- Longerich, Peter (2012). Heinrich Himmler: A Life. Oxford; New York: Oxford University Press. ISBN 978-0-19-959232-6.
- McGovern, James (1968). Martin Bormann. New York: William Morrow & Company. OCLC 441132.
- Miller, Michael (2006). Leaders of the SS and German Police, Vol. 1. San Jose, CA: R. James Bender. ISBN 978-93-297-0037-2.
- Moll, Martin (2016). Spencer C. Tucker (ed.). World War II: The Definitive Encyclopedia and Document Collection [5 volumes]. Vol. 1. Santa Barbara; Denver: ABC-CLIO. ISBN 978-1-4408-4593-2.
- Mosse, George (2003). Nazi Culture: Intellectual, Cultural and Social Life in the Third Reich. Madison, WI: University of Wisconsin Press. ISBN 978-0-299-19304-1.
- Nilsson, Mikael (2020). Hitler Redux: The Incredible History of Hitler's So-Called Table Talks. London; New York: Routledge. ISBN 978-1-000-17329-1.
- Petropoulos, Jonathan (1 February 1999). Art as Politics in the Third Reich. Chapel Hill: University of North Carolina Press. ISBN 978-0-8078-4809-8.
- Overy, Richard (2005) [2004]. The Dictators: Hitler's Germany and Stalin's Russia. London: Penguin. ISBN 978-0-14-191224-0.
- Schirrmacher, Thomas (2007). Hitlers Kriegsreligion. Die Verankerung der Weltanschauung Hitlers in seiner religiösen Begrifflichkeit und seinem Gottesbild.
- Sereny, Gitta (1996) [1995]. Albert Speer: His Battle With Truth. New York: Vintage. ISBN 978-0-679-76812-8.
- Shirer, William L. (1960). The Rise and Fall of the Third Reich. New York: Simon & Schuster. LCCN 60-6729.
- Speer, Albert (1971) [1969]. Inside the Third Reich. New York: Avon. ISBN 978-0-380-00071-5.
- Tofahrn, Klaus W. (2008). Das Dritte Reich und der Holocaust (in German). Frankfurt am Main: Peter Lang. ISBN 978-3-631-57702-8.
- Trevor-Roper, Hugh (2002) [1947]. The Last Days of Hitler. London: Pan Books. ISBN 978-0-330-49060-3.
- Whiting, Charles (1996) [1973]. The Hunt for Martin Bormann: The Truth. London: Pen & Sword. ISBN 0-85052-527-6.
- Williams, Max (2015). SS Elite: The Senior Leaders of Hitler's Praetorian Guard. Vol. I. Fonthill Media LLC. ISBN 978-1-78155-433-3.
- Wilson, James (2013). Hitler's Alpine Headquarters. Barnsley: Pen and Sword. ISBN 978-1-78303-004-0.

Party political offices
| Position established | Secretary to the Deputy Führer; 1933–1941 | Position abolished |
| Position established | Reichsleiter; 1933–1945 | Position abolished |
| Preceded by Rudolf Hess as Deputy Führer | Chief of the Party Chancellery; 1941–1945 | Position abolished |
| Position established | Secretary to the Führer; 1943–1945 | Position abolished |
| Position established | Party Minister; 1945 | Position abolished |
