= Walther Kadow =

German schoolteacher and murder victim (1860–1923)

- Born: January 29, 1860; Hagenow, German Confederation
- Died: May 31, 1923 (aged 63); Parchim, Weimar Republic
- Cause of death: Beating
- Occupation: School teacher
- Known for: Murder victim
- Political party: German Völkisch Freedom Party
- Movement: Nazism

Walther Kadow (January 29, 1860 – May 31, 1923) was a German school teacher who was beaten and killed by Rudolf Höss and a group of Nazi Party accomplices in May 1923 in the forest near Parchim. Kadow, a World War I veteran, was a member of the right-wing German Völkisch Freedom Party, and was suspected of having betrayed German nationalist Albert Leo Schlageter to the French occupation authorities in the Ruhr. Schlageter was executed by the French and was later regarded as a martyr by the Nazis. Höss received a ten-year sentence but was released after four years under a general amnesty. His accomplice, Martin Bormann, a former student of Kadow, was sentenced to one year.

Bormann later became Head of the Nazi Party Chancellery and private secretary to Adolf Hitler and received the Blood Order for his imprisonment over the murder. Höss later became the commandant of Auschwitz concentration camp.
