= Hitler's Table Talk =

Series of transcribed monologues by Adolf Hitler

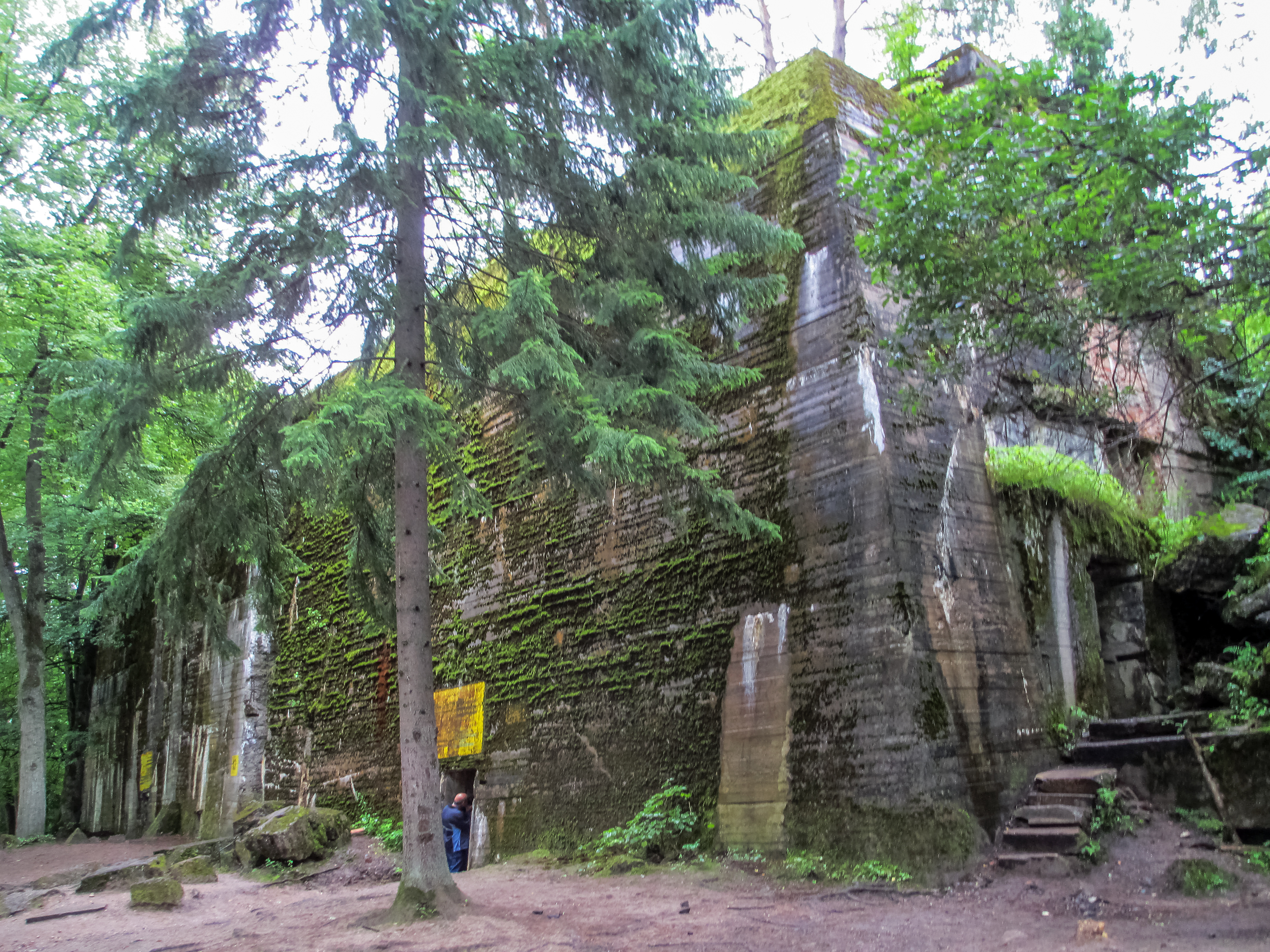
Hitler delivered most of the "Table Talk" monologues at the Wolf's Lair (above), at Werwolf, and at the Berghof in Obersalzberg.

"Hitler's Table Talk" (German: Tischgespräche im Führerhauptquartier, lit. 'Table Talks at the Führer's Headquarters') is a series of World War II monologues delivered by Adolf Hitler, which were transcribed from 1941 to 1944. Hitler's remarks were recorded by Heinrich Heim, Henry Picker, Hans Müller and Martin Bormann and later published by different editors under different titles in four languages.

Bormann, serving as Hitler's private secretary, persuaded Hitler to allow a team of specially picked officers to record in shorthand his private conversations for posterity. The first notes were taken by lawyer Heinrich Heim, starting from 5 July 1941 to mid-March 1942. Taking his place, Henry Picker took notes from 21 March 1942 until 2 August 1942, after which Heim and Bormann continued appending material off and on until 1944.

The talks were recorded at the Führer Headquarters in the company of Hitler's inner circle. The talks dwell on war and foreign affairs but also Hitler's attitudes on religion, culture, philosophy, his aspirations, and feelings towards his enemies and friends. Although the table talk monologues are considered to have originated from actual war time notes in some form, contentious issues remain over aspects of both the published works and the notes they are derived from.

== History ==
The history of the document is relatively complex as numerous individuals were involved, working at different times, collating different parts of the work. This effort spawned two distinct notebooks, which were translated into multiple languages and covered in some instances non-overlapping time-frames due to ongoing legal and copyright issues.

All editions and translations are based on the two German notebooks (both no longer existing), one by Henry Picker and another based on a more complete notebook by Martin Bormann (which is often called the Bormann-Vermerke). Picker was the first to publish the table talk, doing so in 1951 in the original German. This was followed by the French translation in 1952 by François Genoud, a Swiss financier and a principal benefactor of the Nazi diaspora. The English edition came in 1953, which was translated by R. H. Stevens and Norman Cameron and published with an introduction by historian Hugh Trevor-Roper. Both the French and English translations were purportedly based on the Bormann-Vermerke manuscript while Picker's volume was based on his original notes as well as the notes he directly acquired from Heinrich Heim spanning from 5 July 1941 to March 1942. The original German content of the Bormann-Vermerke was not published until 1980 by historian Werner Jochmann. However Jochmann's edition is not complete as it lacks the 100 entries made by Picker between 12 March and 1 September 1942. Both Heim's and Picker's original manuscripts seem to have been lost and their whereabouts are unknown.

Mikael Nilsson has noted that Hitler's Table Talk were heavily edited notes often taken the next day by Bormann and his staff, and which were edited further post-war. Bormann would heavily revise the notes taken by the men to suit his views, and according to evidence was even willing to engage in an anti-Christian stance behind Hitler's back. The ones entrusted to writing the notes down were Henry Picker and Heinrich Heim. Picker even noted Bormann would make him insert statements he had not even heard, and Heim's processes was similar. Francois Genoud, who possessed most of the table talks (he claimed that he lost them), engaged in distorting the Table Talks further. He was found to have also forged “Hitler’s Political Testament” (not to be confused with the one within the Last will and testament of Adolf Hitler) where he was likely motivated to insert pro-Arab and anti-colonial statements as being Hitler's for his own agenda. Even the initial publishers of the Table Talks would make further distortions, such as deleting Hitler's use of the word “Crusade” to describe Operation Barbarossa.

Albert Speer, who was the Minister of Armaments for Germany, in his Spandau diaries, wrote that "Tischgesprache (Table Talk) published by Picker gives a good idea of Hitler's topics of conversation" Speer stated that Hitler often spoke at length about his favorite subjects while dinner guests were reduced to silent listeners. In the presence of his "superiors by birth and education" Hitler made a sincere effort to "present his thoughts in as impressive manner as possible". Speer noted that "we must remember that this collection includes only those passages in Hitler's monologues—they took up one to two hours every day—which struck Picker as significant. Complete transcripts would reinforce the sense of stifling boredom". However Speer's book gave a review of the Table Talks in 1960 where despite the general topics being accurate, it had been so heavily “edited” that Hitler was “unrecognizable” and that it gave the wrong impression, and that Hitler would never speak so freely under the circumstance. He noted Picker in particular stood out, instead of being unnoticed.

According to historian Max Domarus, Hitler insisted on absolute silence when he delivered his monologues. No one was allowed to interrupt or contradict him. Magda Goebbels reported to Galeazzo Ciano: "It is always Hitler who talks! He can be Führer as much as he likes, but he always repeats himself and bores his guests". Historian Ian Kershaw writes:

Some of the guests—among them Goebbels, Göring, and Speer—were regulars. Others were newcomers or were seldom invited. The talk was often of world affairs. But Hitler would tailor the discussion to those present. He was careful in what he said. He consciously set out to impress his opinion on his guests, perhaps at times to gauge their reaction. Sometimes he dominated the 'conversation' with a monologue. At other times, he was content to listen while Goebbels sparred with another guest, or a more general discussion unfolded. Sometimes the table talk was interesting. New guests could find the occasion exciting and Hitler's comments a 'revelation'. Frau Below, the wife of the new Luftwaffe-Adjutant, found the atmosphere, and Hitler's company, at first exhilarating and was greatly impressed by his knowledge of history and art. But for the household staff who had heard it all many times, the midday meal was often a tedious affair.

After the war, Speer referred to the table talks as "rambling nonsense", adding:

[Hitler] was that classic German type known as Besserwisser, the know-it-all. His mind was cluttered with minor information and misinformation, about everything. I believe that one of the reasons he gathered so many flunkies around him was that his instinct told him that first-rate people couldn't possibly stomach the outpourings.

== Controversies ==
Although the table talk monologues are often considered authentic, contentious issues remain over aspects of the published works. These include the reliability of particular translated statements within the French and English editions, questions over the manner in which Martin Bormann may have edited his notes and disputes over which edition is most reliable. François Genoud denied claims that he had inserted words into the original German manuscript, pointing out that it was close-typed apart from handwritten additions by Bormann and therefore such insertions would not have been possible. Picker himself stated that Bormann “always exaggerated” Hitler's tirades against Jews and priests in the Table Talks notes.

Richard Evans expresses caution when using the English edition, describing it as "flawed (and in no sense 'official')" and adding that it needed to be compared to the 1980 German edition to ensure it was accurate before being used. Ian Kershaw also notes that the English edition is imperfect, with a tendency to miss words, leave out lines, or include phrases not found in the German text. He uses the original German sources for reference, advising "due caution" in using the English translations.

In 2016, historian Mikael Nilsson argued that Hugh Trevor-Roper failed to disclose source-critical problems, including evidence that significant portions of the English translation were translated directly from Genoud's French edition and not the original German Bormann-Vermerke as claimed by Trevor-Roper in his preface. Nilsson maintains that this information was likely known to Trevor-Roper because it was laid out in the publishing contract that the "translation into English will be made on the basis of the French version by François Genoud". Nilsson concludes that "the translation process was highly doubtful; the history of the manuscript from conception to publication is mysterious at best, and it is impossible to be sure that the majority of the entries are in fact authentic (that is, actual statements by Hitler as opposed to things he could have said)". For this reason, Nilsson argues that Hitler should not be listed as its author because it is not clear "how much of it is Hitler's words as they were spoken, and how much is a product of the later recollection and editing process". Nilsson would develop this argument further in his 2020 book which further demonstrated the source-critical problems of Hitler's Table Talk and revealed that The Testament of Adolf Hitler was a forgery by Francois Genoud. Mikael Nilsson concludes his book with the following statement: “However, and this is very important, the results presented in this book should absolutely not be interpreted as meaning that the table talks are not authentic. They really are, at least for the most part, memoranda of statements that Hitler made at some point or another in his wartime HQs. They were made by either Heim, Picker, Müller, or Bormann, although there are also some notes that have no name attached to them.” Essentially, Nilsson's view is that the German version is a second-hand version of the original notes of the time, most of which were in the possession of Genoud; their derivations reflect the biases of the writers and present an unreliable accounting of Hitler's words that cannot be checked against the original notes that have been lost. Albert Speer later recalled that on one occasion when Hitler expressed hope, even after 1942, that the Catholic and Protestant Churches could be reunited under him as head of state and the church (similar to the Anglican Church of England), Martin Bormann did not record this as he would other statements from Hitler.

=== Hitler's comments on religion ===
Hitler's Table Talk reveals that he continued to wish for a unified Protestant Reich Church of Germany for some time after 1937, which had largely proven unsuccessful. This was in line with his earlier policy of uniting all the Protestant churches so they would purvey the new racial and nationalist doctrines of the regime and act as a unifying rather than divisive force in Germany. By 1940, many historians believe Hitler had abandoned even the syncretist idea of a positive Christianity. According to Thomas Childers, after 1938 Hitler began to publicly support a Nazified version of science, particularly social Darwinism, at the core of Nazi ideology in place of a religious one, a development that many historians regard is reflected in his increasingly hostile remarks towards Christianity in the Table Talk. Historian Richard Weikart characterised Hitler's belief in "evolutionary ethics as the expression of the will of God" who routinely "equated the laws of nature and the will of Providence". Nilsson's book "Hitler's Redux" also casts doubt on the veracity of Hitler's statements quoted on religion and other topics and in particular the use of the word "Christianity" and the quotes of Hitler's condemnation of it, which are likely to have been Bormann's, Picker's, and Genaud's words and additions rather than Hitler's actual words. In addition, similar issues have been raised about a lack of authenticity in the so-called "Hitler's Political Testament".

In the Table Talk, Hitler is quoted as praising Julian the Apostate's Three Books Against the Galilaeans, an anti-Christian tract from 362. In the entry dated 21 October 1941, Hitler is alleged to have stated:

When one thinks of the opinions held concerning Christianity by our best minds a hundred, two hundred years ago, one is ashamed to realise how little we have since evolved. I didn't know that Julian the Apostate had passed on such clear-sighted judgment on Christianity [...] the Galilean, who later was called Christ, intended something quite different. The Galilean was and must always be regarded as a popular leader who took up His position against the Jews [...] and it's certain that Jesus was not a Jew. The Jews, by the way, regarded Him as the son of a whore—of a whore and a Roman soldier. The decisive falsification of Jesus's teachings was the work of St. Paul [...] or Paul of Tarsus (his name was Saul, before the road to Damascus) was one of those who persecuted Jesus most savagely.

The Table Talk also attributes to Hitler a confidence in science over religion: "Science cannot lie, for it's always striving, according to the momentary state of knowledge, to deduce what is true. When it makes a mistake, it does so in good faith. It's Christianity that's the liar". However, Hitler insisted: "We don't want to educate anyone in atheism". Of the Ten Commandments of the Old Testament, Hitler affirms his belief that they "are a code of living to which there's no refutation. These precepts correspond to irrefragable needs of the human soul; they're inspired by the best religious spirit, and the Churches here support themselves on a solid foundation".

==== Recent views ====
In 2003, two challenges appeared to a previous consensus view. One was from Richard Steigmann-Gall as part of his wider thesis that "leading Nazis in fact considered themselves Christian" or at least understood their movement "within a Christian frame of reference". He argues that several passages in the Table Talk reveal Hitler to have a direct attachment to Christianity, to be a great admirer of Jesus, and "gave no indication that he was now agnostic or atheistic", a worldview Hitler continued to denigrate the Soviet Union for promoting. Steigmann-Gall maintains that Hitler's "view of Christianity is fraught with tension and ambiguity" and Hitler's Table Talk shows an "unmistakable rupture" with his earlier religious views, which Steigmann-Gall characterises as Christian. He attributes this to Hitler's anger at his failure to exert control over the German churches and not anger at Christianity itself. Steigmann-Gall's wider thesis proved highly controversial, although as John S. Conway pointed out, the differences between his thesis and the earlier consensus were mostly about the "degree and timing" of Nazi anti-clericalism.

In the same year, the historical validity of remarks in the English and French translations of the table-talk were challenged in a new partial translation by Richard Carrier and Reinhold Mittschang, who went so far as to call them "entirely untrustworthy", suggesting they had been altered by Genoud. They put forward a new translation of twelve quotations based on Picker and Jochmann's German editions as well as a fragment from the Bormann-Vermerke preserved at the Library of Congress. Carrier maintains that much of Trevor-Roper's English edition is actually a verbatim translation of Genoud's French and not the original German. Carrier's thesis is that an analysis between Picker's original German text and Genoud's French translation reveals that Genoud's version is at best a poor translation, and in certain places contains "blatant distortions". Many of the quotations used to support arguments in favor of Hitler's disdain for Christianity are derived from the Genoud–Trevor-Roper translation. Carrier argues that no one "who quotes this text is quoting what Hitler actually said".

In the new foreword to the Table Talk, Gerhard Weinberg commented that "Carrier has shown the English text of the table-talk that originally appeared in 1953 and is reprinted here derives from Genoud's French edition and not from one of the German texts". Citing Carrier's paper Diethelm Prowe remarked that Trevor-Roper's Table Talk "has been proven to be wholly unreliable as a source almost a decade ago". Rainer Bucher referencing the problems raised by Carrier described the English translation as "not only of dubious origin but also of dubious intent and ideological underpinning", choosing instead to rely on both Picker and Heim's German editions. Derek Hastings references Carrier's paper for "an attempt to undermine the reliability of the statements". Carrier's thesis that the English translation should be entirely dispensed with is not accepted by Steigmann-Gall, who despite referencing the controversies raised by Carrier, "ultimately presume[d] its authenticity". Johnstone has noted that Richard Carrier has proved that only 4 of the 42 comments in the Table Talks about the malevolent influence of Christianity were false, without discussion of the rest, and that therefore, Carrier has been far from successful in demolishing the image of Hitler's non-Christian character. There have been no published rebuttals to Nilsson's work.

==== Contemporaneous sources ====
Between 1941 and 1944, the period in which the Table Talk was being transcribed, a number of Hitler's intimates cite him expressing negative views of Christianity (while often using their own words to describe it), including Joseph Goebbels and Bormann (both of whom had expressed negative views themselves). Cardinal Michael von Faulhaber reported that after speaking with Hitler in 1936, he "undoubtedly lives in belief in God [...] He recognizes Christianity as the builder of western culture". Ian Kershaw concludes that Hitler had deceived Faulhaber, noting his "evident ability to simulate, even to potentially critical church leaders, an image of a leader keen to uphold and protect Christianity".

A widespread consensus among historians, sustained over a long period of time following the initial work of William Shirer in the 1960s, maintains that Hitler was anti-clerical. This continues to be the mainstream position on Hitler's religious views and these views continue to be supported by quotations from the English translation of the Table Talk. Michael Burleigh contrasted Hitler's public pronouncements on Christianity with those in Table Talk, suggesting that Hitler's real religious views were "a mixture of materialist biology, a faux-Nietzschean contempt for core, as distinct from secondary, Christian values, and a visceral anti-clericalism". Richard Evans also reiterated the view that Nazism was secular, scientific, and anti-religious in outlook in the last volume of his trilogy on Nazi Germany, writing that "Hitler's hostility to Christianity reached new heights, or depths, during the war", citing the 1953 English translation of Hitler's Table Talk 1941–1944.

== See also ==
- Hitler and Mannerheim recording
- Last will and testament of Adolf Hitler
