= Henry Picker =

German lawyer, stenographer and author

Henry Picker (6 February 1912 – 2 May 1988) was a lawyer, stenographer and author who co-transcribed and first published transcripts of Adolf Hitler's informal talks, known colloquially as the Table Talk.

== Biography ==
Henry Picker was born in Wilhelmshaven, Germany. The son of a German senator, Picker studied law and graduated from the University of Kiel in 1936. Picker became a member of the Nazi Party in 1930, and in 1942 became a senior executive and legal staff member in the Führer Headquarters.

Picker, with the help of Bormann, brought Stalin's Separate Peace Offer to Hitler in April 1943, who made it after consultation with Himmler, Ribbentrop and Canaris rejected.

From 1941 he was married to sports teacher Irene Atzinger. The couple had four sons and one daughter.

== Hitler's Table Talk ==
Picker's version of the Table Talk was published in 1951 under the title Hitlers Tischgespräche im Führerhauptquartier, and relied upon the original German notes he acquired from Heinrich Heim taken from July 1941 to March 1942, and Picker's own notes taken from March 21, 1942, through August 2, 1942.

The first edition of Picker's Table Talk was arranged thematically, unlike the French and English editions which were arranged chronologically. A later edition of Picker's work was published in 1963, which was more extensive, carefully annotated, chronologically organized, and published with an introduction by German historian Percy Ernst Schramm. Both the second (1963) and third (1976) editions contain several testimonials by fellow bunker officers relating to the books's accuracy and authenticity, including General Gerhard Engel. Picker was involved in several legal battles with François Genoud and Hugh Trevor-Roper concerning the copyrights to the work. In 1963 Picker published a book about Pope John XXIII, in the preparation of which he was assisted by Vatican librarian Count Giuseppe Newlin (Mieczysław Dunin-Borkowski). Henry Picker and his historical books were promoted and supported by Federal President Professor Dr. Theodor Heuss,

Federal Chancellor Dr. Konrad Adenauer, by Pope Pius XII, by Pope John XXIII, by Pope Paul VI, and by Patriarch Athenagoras I. of Constantinople. Patriarch Benedictos I. of Jerusalem proclaimed Henry Picker to Excellence and awarded him the Cross of the Order of the Holy Sepulcher in Gold and with a crown and accepted him into the Order of the Holy Sepulchre. The Greek Orthodox Patriarch Athenagoras I. of Constantinople awarded Henry Picker the Grand Cross of Mount Athos and the Pope awarded him the Lateran cross in gold.
