= Bormann dictations =

Monologues of Adolf Hitler

The Bormann dictations of 4 to 26 February and 2 April 1945 were monologues of Adolf Hitler recorded and edited by his secretary Martin Bormann. Their authenticity is disputed, although some historians believe them to be fully or mostly reliable, even if possibly shortened or corrected by Bormann.

== Editions ==
Swiss banker and right-wing extremist François Genoud, a sponsor of Nazi criminals and a Holocaust denier, initially published the Bormann dictations in both French and English. The later German-language translation was published with the additional subtitle "Hitler's political testament" and combined with an essay by Hugh Trevor-Roper and an afterword by André François-Poncet. The German subtitle was later adopted by some recipients, although the Bormann dictations should not be confused with the actual last will and testament of Adolf Hitler, authored on 29 April 1945.

The Bormann dictations are thus not usually seen as a political testament.

== Contents ==
Hitler, unlike in most speeches, used the first person and spoke about his political goals without any veiling or references to providence. He told Bormann that he planned to annihilate all the world's Jews after winning the war.
