= Nazi Party Chancellery =

1941–1945 head office for the German Nazi Party

- Parteikanzlei
- Parteiadler

- Personal flag for Martin Bormann

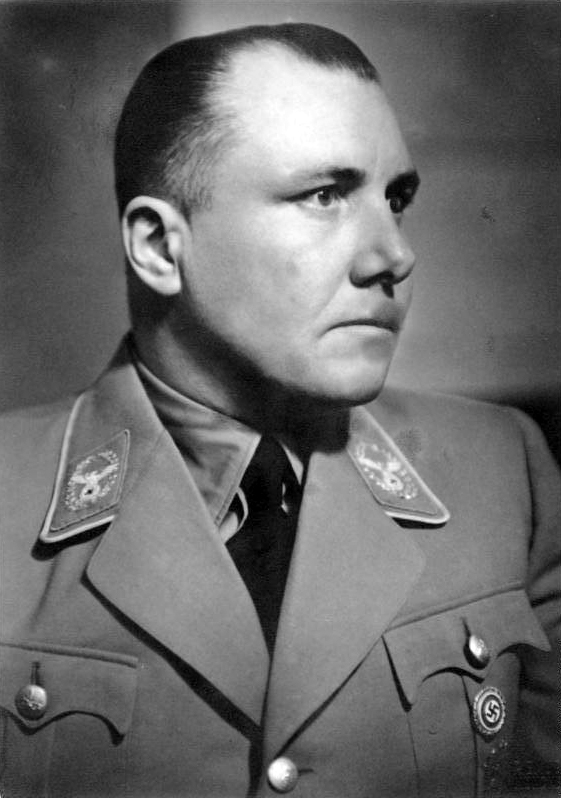
- Martin Bormann; 12 May 1941 – 2 May 1945
- Nazi Party
- Reports to: the Führer
- Appointer: the Führer
- Precursor: Staff of the Deputy Führer
- Formation: 12 May 1941
- Abolished: 8 May 1945
- Deputy: Gerhard Klopfer

The Party Chancellery (German: Parteikanzlei), was the name of the head office for the German Nazi Party (NSDAP), designated as such on 12 May 1941. The office existed previously as the Staff of the Deputy Führer (Stab des Stellvertreters des Führers) but was renamed after Rudolf Hess flew to Scotland in an attempt to negotiate a peace agreement without Adolf Hitler's authorization. Hess was denounced by Hitler, his former office was dissolved, and the new Party Chancellery was formed in its place under Hess' former deputy, Martin Bormann.

== History ==
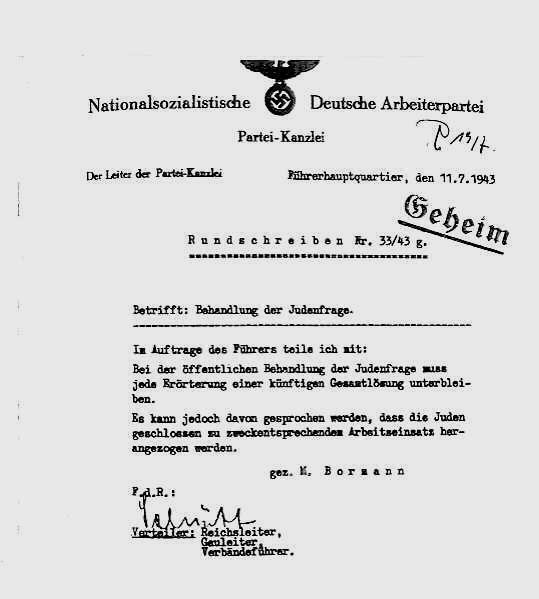
As Chief of the NSDAP Partei-Kanzlei, Martin Bormann orders Party officials not to discuss publicly a future complete solution "of the Jewish question"

Starting in 1933, the party office had its seat in Munich under the leadership of Adolf Hitler's Deputy Führer Rudolf Hess, who held the rank of a Reich Minister in the Hitler Cabinet. (Note: As early as 1926, a "Reich directorate" was formed as part of "a departmentalized party bureaucracy", perhaps an embryonic predecessor organization to what would become three chancelleries, including the Staff of the Deputy Führer, which was reconstituted in 1941 as the Party Chancellery. Hess was the secretary, the treasurer was F.K. Schwarz, and its secretary general was Philipp Bouhler. From the onset the organization grew quickly and while it only consisted of twenty-five persons and three autos at first, there were soon departments for "foreign policy, press, industrial relations, agriculture, economy, interior, justice, science, and labor"; it also had institutions for "race and culture" as well as propaganda. This nominal organization dissolved over time with the official creation of additional ministries but it nonetheless formed an organizational centerpiece for the early development of the NSDAP.) Hess's department was responsible for handling party affairs; the settling of disputes within the party and acting as an intermediary between the party and the state regarding policy decisions and legislation. The organisation rivaled for influence not only with the Reich Chancellery under Hans Lammers but also with the Führer's Chancellery and the Nazi Gau- and Reichsleiter. Typical of the Nazi regime in many regards, the Party Chancellery competed for spheres of interest with the other two chancelleries, creating several areas of functional duplication, additionally complicating "the relationship between party and state."

Another problem that Hitler's Chancellery faced was the administrative confusion that arose from all the competing interests of the various subordinated constituent Party organizations like the SA, the SS, the Hitler Youth and the Labor Front among others. There was a seeming lack of a centralized administrative authority for the Nazi Party, so Gauleiters bypassed the office of Hess as they believed themselves only responsible to Hitler alone. Even though Hess was Deputy Führer, his office was unable to manage the administrative tasks until Martin Bormann was appointed Chief of Staff to Hess's office in July 1933.

Bormann, personal secretary and chief of staff to Hess, was the man behind the scenes managing the day-to-day business of the Staff of the Deputy Führer. Bormann used his position to create an extensive bureaucracy and involved himself in as much of the decision making as possible. Bormann soon became an efficient and indispensable representative of the party's interests, disempowering the regional leaders at the intermediate level and extending the Staff of the Deputy Führer's involvement in state affairs through the enactment of laws and Führer's decrees. In 1935 Bormann began managing Hitler's "rural headquarters" at the Obersalzberg in Bavaria. Also in 1935, he was given charge over Hitler's personal finances and used his proximity to increase the office's authority over the Party's numerous organizations; (Note: Following Hitler's address to the Nazi Students' League in January 1936, the Staff of the Deputy Führer suddenly took a keen interest in academic appointments across the Reich, but the efforts towards this end proved relatively impracticable since other interested individuals and organizations like the Interior Ministry, the Rector, the Nazi Student's League, professors, and local Party officials also sought to control the academic appointment process.) despite this development, incessant jurisdictional struggles still characterized the Nazi state. Bormann set up the Adolf Hitler Fund of German Trade and Industry, which collected money from German industrialists on Hitler's behalf. Some of the funds received through this programme were disbursed to various party leaders, but Bormann retained most of it for Hitler's personal use. By 1936, Bormann was passing orders directly from Hitler to Reich ministers and Party officials.

After Hess' flight to the United Kingdom to seek peace negotiations with the British government on 10 May 1941, Hitler abolished the post of Deputy Führer on 12 May 1941. Hitler assigned Hess's former duties to Bormann, with the title of Head of the Parteikanzlei (Party Chancellery). In this position he was responsible for all NSDAP appointments, and was answerable only to Hitler. The Party Chancellery was also privy to the extreme violence being carried out in the eastern theater by the SS Task Forces in the summer and fall of 1941, as Gestapo chief, Heinrich Müller, distributed reports, which were signed by senior officials from throughout the Reich. Legal and administrative questions governing jurisdictional matters related to the Wannsee Conference were shared by Reinhard Heydrich with Party organizations, including Bormann's Party Chancellery in late January 1942, rendering them all complicit for the orchestration of the Final Solution.

Bormann used his position to restrict access to Hitler for his own benefit and, supported by deputies like Albert Hoffmann, Gerhard Klopfer and Helmuth Friedrichs, to further party influence in areas such as armaments and manpower. Armaments Minister Albert Speer complained about Bormann's interfering with his staff in this manner. On 12 April 1943, Bormann was officially appointed the Führer's Private Secretary, reaching a unique position of power and trust with Hitler. Sometime in the autumn of 1943, Goebbels expressed misgivings with Hitler's dependence on Bormann concerning domestic affairs, his focus on military matters and his seeming neglect of politics—Goebbels recorded this moment as "a leadership crisis" in his diary. Goebbels further believed that "the Party Chancellery chief was managing Hitler." By that time, Bormann had de facto control over all domestic matters. He held the position of leader of the Nazi Party Chancellery until 30 April 1945. Late in waning months of the war, Bormann was still "working feverishly" to restructure the Nazi Party for a post-war Germany. Sharing in Hitler's delusions, Bormann was exercising his power over the Party by issuing decrees and directives on a wide variety of issues at the very end, meanwhile Hitler was moving "non-existent armies" around on a map deep inside the bunker.
