= Mikael Nilsson =

Mikael Nilsson may refer to:

- Mikael Nilsson (footballer, born 1967), Swedish footballer
- Mikael Nilsson (footballer, born 1968), Swedish footballer (Swedish international in 1990s)
- Mikael Nilsson (footballer, born 1978), Swedish footballer (Swedish international in 2000s)
- "Mikael Nilsson", an alias given to Swedish musician Nattramn, which was once believed to be his real name
