= Adolf Hitler Fund of German Trade and Industry =

Political funding system in Nazi Germany

The Adolf Hitler Fund of German Trade and Industry ("Adolf-Hitler-Spende der deutschen Wirtschaft") was a donation from the German employers' association and the "Reichsverband" of German industry, which was established on June 1, 1933, to support the NSDAP. It was named after the Führer of the NSDAP Adolf Hitler and was meant for the "national reconstruction" ("nationaler Wiederaufbau").

The inspiration to this project came from Gustav Krupp von Bohlen und Halbach, the chairman of the Reichsverband der deutschen Industrie, and Martin Bormann.

According to Speer, entrepreneurs were requested to contribute in appreciation for their profits from the economic boom. Bormann then distributed some of the donations to various party leaders on behalf of Hitler.

At first it was a voluntary donation, but during the following years it had become more and more of a forced contribution for some concerns. From the fund's inception through 1945 the NSDAP collected about 700 million ℛ︁ℳ︁ (equivalent to €3 billion 2021).

== See also ==
- Freundeskreis der Wirtschaft
- Industrielleneingabe
