= Heinrich Heim =

German lawyer

Heinrich Heim (15 June 1900 – 26 June 1988) was a lawyer and NSDAP Ministerialrat who transcribed and co-published with Werner Jochmann transcripts of Adolf Hitler's informal talks, known colloquially as Hitler's Table Talk. Heim's version of the table talk was published in 1980 under the title Adolf Hitler Monologe im Führerhauptquartier 1941-1944. Heim's edition relied upon the original German notes, recorded by Heim from 5 July 1941 to mid-March 1942, and August–September 1942. According to German historian Clemens Vollnhals, from a "source-critical point of view, the most reliable version of the Table Talk remains Werner Jochmann's edition of 1980."

== Biography ==
Heinrich Heim was born in Munich, Bavaria into a distinguished family of lawyers. His father was a judge at the Bavarian Supreme Court, and a member of the Bavarian Court. Raised in Zweibrücken, Germany, Heim studied law at the Ludwig-Maximilians-Universität München. After graduation, Heim was hired by a law firm, where he worked with lawyer Hans Frank, who would later become a high-ranking official in Nazi Germany. Heim primarily represented the interests of a relief fund headed by Martin Bormann. From 1939 to 1943, Heim worked as an aide to Bormann, which later led to his notable work recording Hitler's informal conversations.

He died in Munich in 1988.
