= Modzurów =

- Village
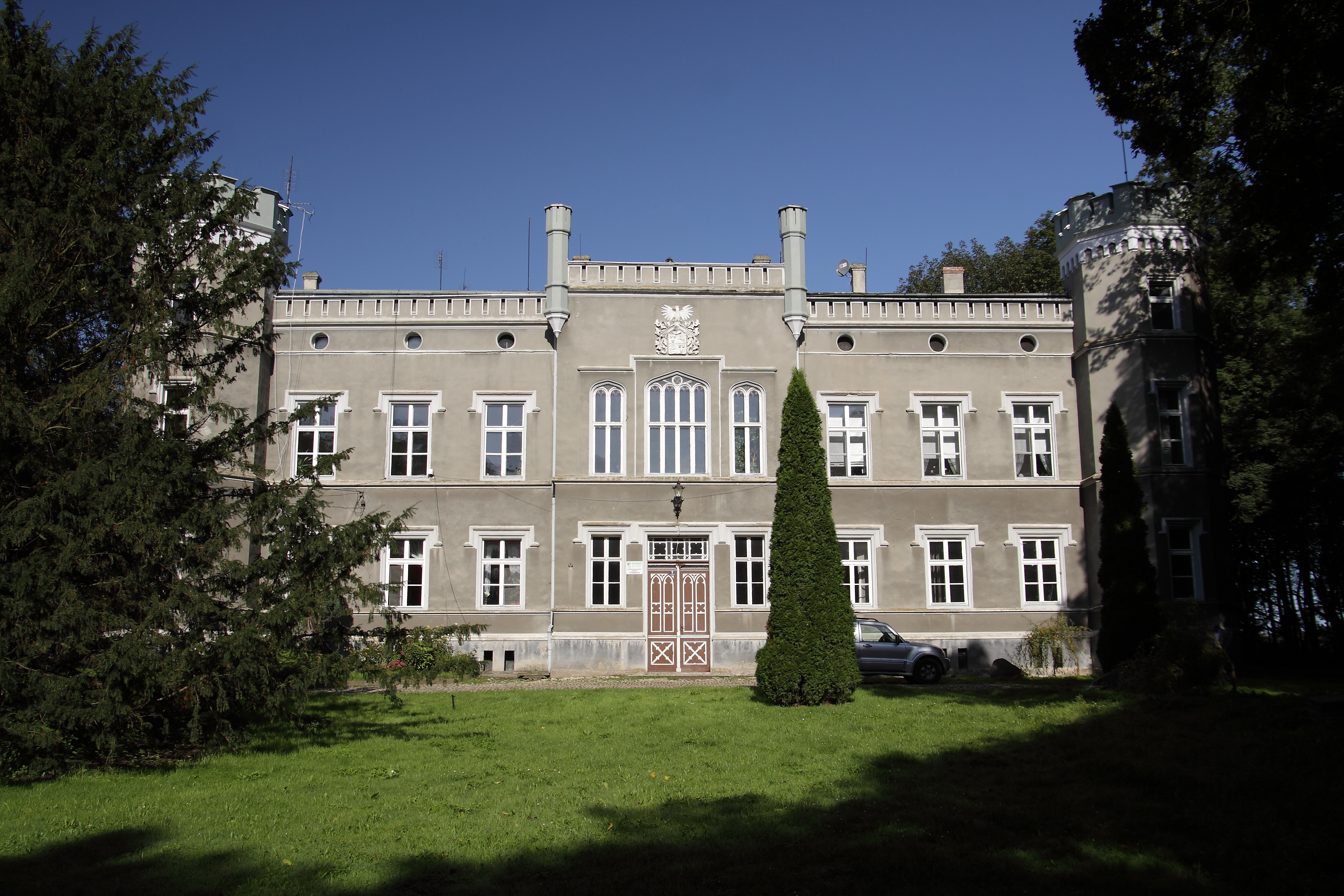
- Palace in Modzurów

- Location within Poland
- Coordinates: 50°9′20″N 18°7′52″E
- Country: Poland
- Voivodeship: Silesian
- County: Racibórz
- Gmina: Rudnik
- Population: 401
- Website: www.modzurow.pl

Modzurów [mɔˈd͡zuruf] is a village in the administrative district of Gmina Rudnik, within Racibórz County, Silesian Voivodeship, in southern Poland.

== Gallery ==
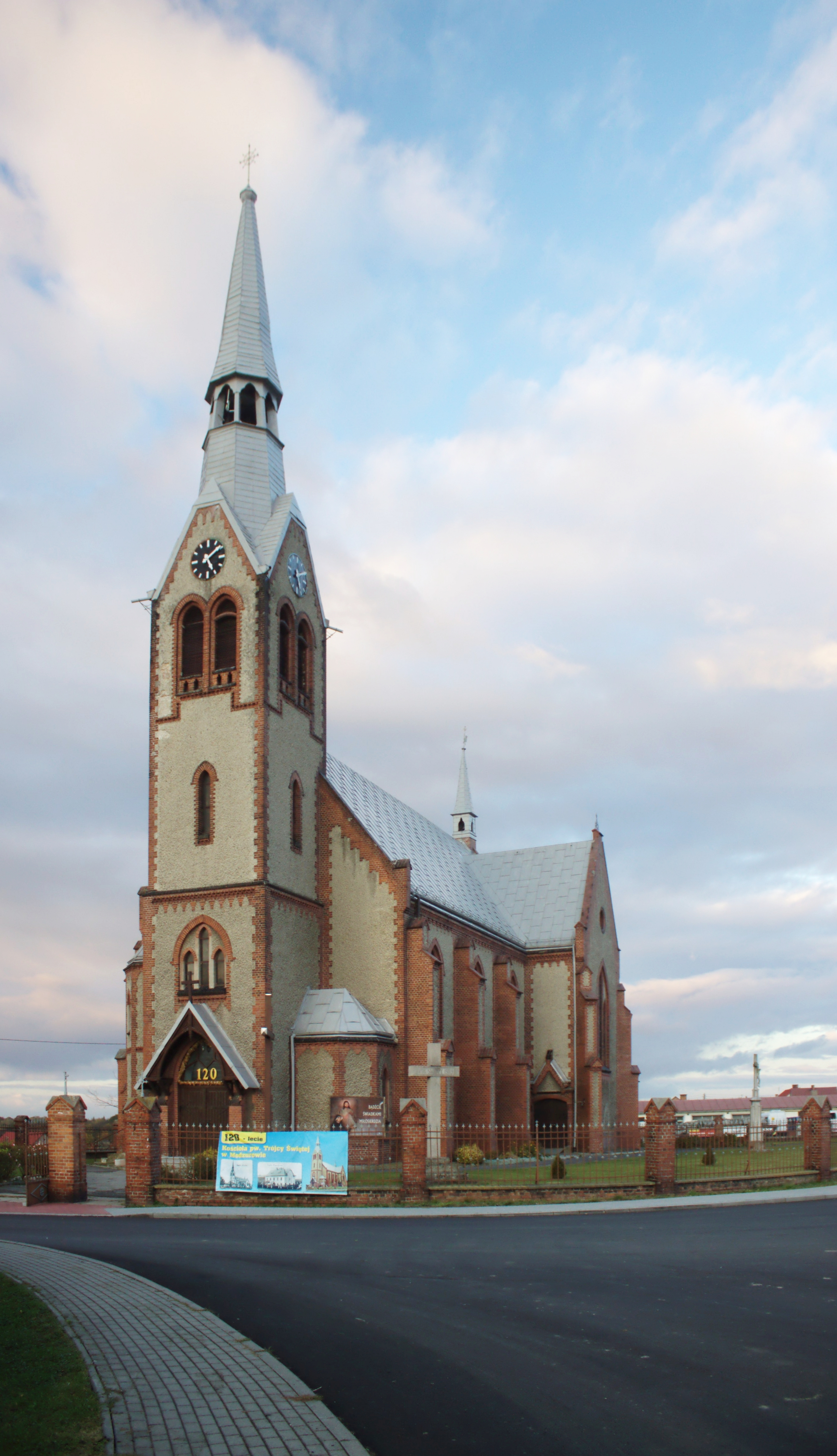
Church

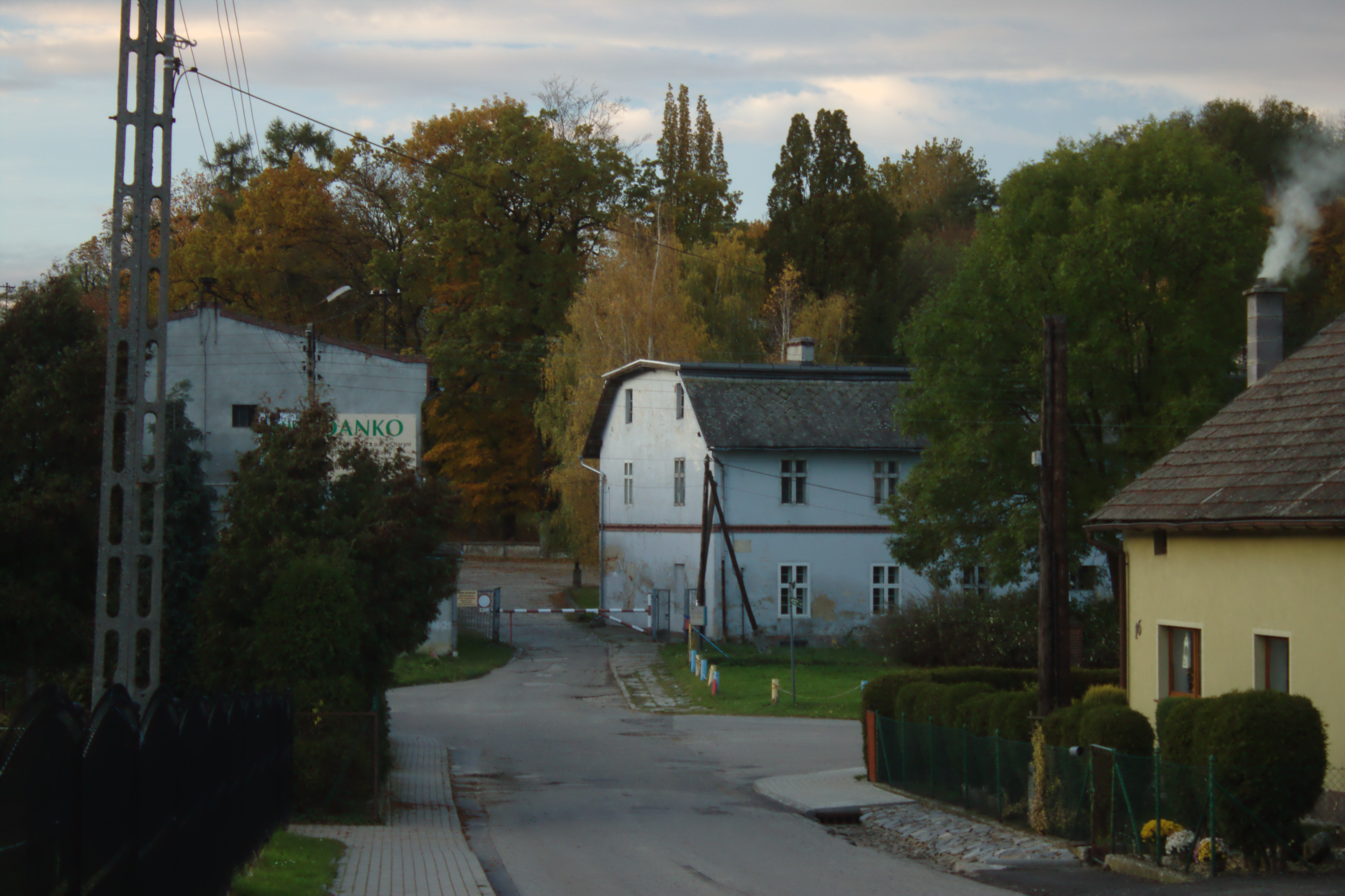
Street

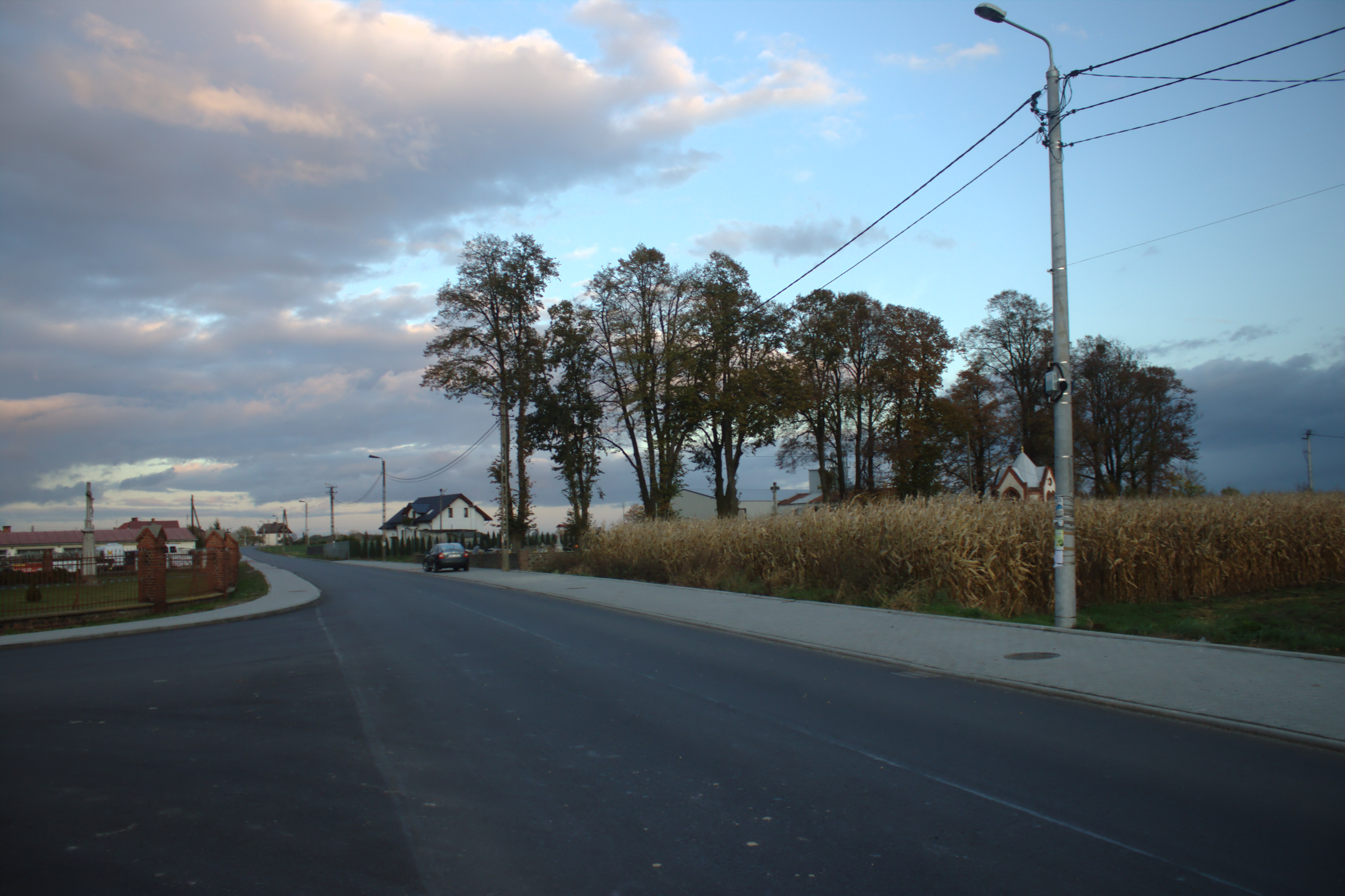
Street
