= Greater Germanic Reich =

State planned by Nazi Germany

Approximate boundaries of the planned "Greater Germanic Reich" (including possible satellites and protectorates), according to the Institute of Contemporary History in Munich: Greater Germanic Reich (With planned eastern expansions of Reichskommissariats) Satellite states totally dependent upon the Reich States dependent upon the Reich

The Greater Germanic Reich (German: Großgermanisches Reich), fully styled the Greater Germanic Reich of the German Nation (German: Großgermanisches Reich der Deutschen Nation), was the official state name of the political entity that Nazi Germany tried to establish in Europe during World War II. The territorial claims for the Greater Germanic Reich fluctuated over time. As early as the autumn of 1933, Adolf Hitler envisioned annexing such territories as Bohemia, western Poland, and Austria to Germany and the formation of satellite or puppet states without independent economies or policies of their own.

This pan-Germanic Empire was expected to assimilate practically all of continental Germanic Europe into an enormously expanded Reich. Territorially speaking, this encompassed the already-enlarged German Reich itself (consisting of pre-1938 Germany proper, Austria, Bohemia, Moravia, Czech Silesia, Alsace-Lorraine, Eupen-Malmedy, Memel, Lower Styria, Upper Carniola, Southern Carinthia, Danzig, and Poland), the Netherlands, Belgium, Luxembourg, Denmark, Norway, Sweden, Iceland, Liechtenstein, parts of northern and northeastern France, and the German-speaking and French-speaking parts of Switzerland.

The most notable Germanic-speaking exception would have been the United Kingdom: the Nazis' New Order envisaged the role of Britain not as a German province but instead as a German-allied seafaring partner. Another exception was the German-populated territory in South Tyrol, an area which Germany assigned to its fellow-Axis power, Fascist Italy, in 1939. The Reich's western frontiers with France were to revert to those of the earlier Holy Roman Empire, which would have meant the complete German annexation of all of Wallonia, French Switzerland, and large areas of northern and eastern France. Additionally, the policy of Lebensraum required mass expansion of Germany and the settlement of Germans eastwards as far as the Ural Mountains (seizing territory from the Baltic states and the Soviet Union in the process). Hitler originally planned for the deportation of any "surplus" Russian population living west of the Urals to resettlement east of the Urals in Siberia.

== Ideological background ==
=== Racial theories ===
Nazi racial theories regarded the Germanic peoples of Europe as belonging to a racially superior Nordic subset of the larger Aryan race, who were regarded as the only true culture-bearers of civilized society. These peoples were viewed as either "true Germanic peoples" that had "lost their sense of racial pride", or as close racial relatives of the Germans. German Chancellor Adolf Hitler also believed that the Ancient Greeks and Romans were the racial ancestors of the Germans, and the first torchbearers of "Nordic–Greek" art and culture. He particularly expressed his admiration for Ancient Sparta, declaring it to have been the purest racial state:

"The subjugation of 350,000 Helots by 6,000 Spartans was only possible because of the racial superiority of the Spartans." The Spartans had created "the first racialist state."

Furthermore, Hitler's concept of "Germanic" did not simply refer to an ethnic, cultural, or linguistic group, but also to a distinctly biological one, the superior "Germanic blood" that he wanted to salvage from the control of the enemies of the Aryan race. He stated that Germany possessed more of these "Germanic elements" than any other country in the world, which he estimated as "four fifths of our people".

Wherever Germanic blood is to be found anywhere in the world, we will take what is good for ourselves. With what the others have left, they will be unable to oppose the Germanic Empire.

— Adolf Hitler

According to the Nazis, in addition to the Germanic peoples, individuals of seemingly non-Germanic nationality such as French, Polish, Walloon, Czech and so on might actually possess valuable Germanic blood, especially if they were of aristocratic or peasant stock. In order to "recover" these "missing" Germanic elements, they had to be made conscious of their Germanic ancestry through the process of Germanization (the term used by the Nazis for this process was Umvolkung, "restoration to the race"). If the "recovery" was impossible, these individuals had to be destroyed to deny the enemy of using their superior blood against the Aryan race. An example of this type of Nazi Germanization is the kidnapping of "racially valuable" Eastern European children. Curiously, those chosen for Germanization who rejected the Nazis were viewed as being racially more suitable than those who went along without objections, as according to Himmler "it was in the nature of German blood to resist".

On the very first page of Mein Kampf, Hitler openly declared his belief that "common blood belongs in a common Reich", elucidating the notion that the innate quality of race (as the Nazi movement perceived it) should hold precedence over "artificial" concepts such as national identity (including regional German identities such as Prussian and Bavarian) as the deciding factor for which people were "worthy" of being assimilated into a Greater German racial state (Ein Volk, Ein Reich, Ein Führer). Part of the strategic methods which Hitler chose to ensure the present and future supremacy of the Aryan race (which was, according to Hitler, "gradually approaching extinction") was to do away with what he described as the "small state rubbish" (Kleinstaatengerümpel, compare Kleinstaaterei) in Europe in order to unite all these Nordic countries into one unified racial community. From 1921 onward he advocated the creation of a "Germanic Reich of the German Nation".

It was the continent which brought civilization to Great Britain and in turn enabled her to colonize large areas in the rest of the world. America is unthinkable without Europe. Why would we not have the necessary power to become one of the world's centres of attraction? A hundred-and-twenty million people of Germanic origin – if they have consolidated their position this will be a power against which no-one in the world could stand up to. The countries which form the Germanic world have only to gain from this. I can see that in my own case. My birth country is one of the most beautiful regions in the Reich, but what could it do if it were left to its own devices? There is no possibility to develop one’s talents in countries like Austria or Saxony, Denmark or Switzerland. There is no foundation. That is why it is fortunate that potential new spaces are again opened for the Germanic peoples.

— Adolf Hitler, 1942.

=== Name ===
The chosen name for the projected empire was a deliberate reference to the Holy Roman Empire (of the German Nation) that existed in medieval times, known as the First Reich in Nazi historiography. Different aspects of the legacy of this medieval empire in German history were both celebrated and derided by the government of Nazi Germany. Hitler admired the Frankish Emperor Charlemagne for his "cultural creativity", his powers of organization, and his renunciation of the rights of the individual. He criticized the Holy Roman Emperors however for not pursuing an Ostpolitik (Eastern Policy) resembling his own, while being politically focused exclusively on the south. After the Anschluss, Hitler ordered the old imperial regalia (the Imperial Crown, Imperial Sword, the Holy Lance and other items) residing in Vienna to be transferred to Nuremberg, where they were kept between 1424 and 1796. Nuremberg, in addition to being the former unofficial capital of the Holy Roman Empire, was also the place of the Nuremberg rallies. The transfer of the regalia was thus done to both legitimize Hitler's Germany as the successor of the "Old Reich", but also weaken Vienna, the former imperial residence.

After the 1939 German occupation of Bohemia, Hitler declared that the Holy Roman Empire had been "resurrected", although he secretly maintained his own empire to be better than the old "Roman" one. Unlike the "uncomfortably internationalist Catholic empire of Barbarossa", the Germanic Reich of the German Nation would be racist and nationalist. Rather than a return to the values of the Middle Ages, its establishment was to be "a push forward to a new golden age, in which the best aspects of the past would be combined with modern racist and nationalist thinking".

The historical borders of the Holy Empire were also used as grounds for territorial revisionism by the NSDAP, laying claim to modern territories and states that were once part of it. Even before the war, Hitler had dreamed of reversing the Peace of Westphalia, which had given the territories of the Empire almost complete sovereignty. On November 17, 1939, Reich Minister of Propaganda Joseph Goebbels wrote in his diary that the "total liquidation" of this historic treaty was the "great goal" of the Nazi regime, and that since it had been signed in Münster, it would also be officially repealed in the same city.

=== Pan-Germanism versus Pan-Germanicism ===
Despite intending to grant the other "Germanics" of Europe a racially superior status alongside the Germans themselves in an anticipated post-war racio-political order, the Nazis did not however consider granting the subject populations of these countries any national rights of their own. The other Germanic countries were seen as mere extensions of Germany rather than individual units in any way, and the Germans were unequivocally intended to remain the empire's "most powerful source of strength, from both an ideological as well as military standpoint". Even Heinrich Himmler, who among the senior Nazis most staunchly supported the concept, could not shake off the idea of a hierarchical distinction between German Volk and Germanic Völker. The SS's official newspaper, Das Schwarze Korps, never succeeded in reconciling the contradiction between Germanic 'brotherhood' and German superiority. Members of Nazi-type parties in Germanic countries were also forbidden to attend public meetings of the Nazi Party when they visited Germany. After the Battle of Stalingrad this ban was lifted, but only if the attendees made prior notice of their arrival so that the events' speakers could be warned in advance not to make disparaging remarks about their country of origin.

Although Hitler himself and Himmler's SS advocated for a pan-Germanic Empire, the objective was not universally held in the Nazi regime.

=== Germanic mysticism ===
There were also disagreements within the NSDAP leadership on the spiritual implications of cultivating a 'Germanic history' in their ideological program. Hitler was highly critical of Himmler's esoteric völkisch interpretation of the 'Germanic mission'. When Himmler denounced Charlemagne in a speech as "the butcher of the Saxons", Hitler stated that this was not a 'historical crime' but in fact a good thing, for the subjugation of Widukind had brought Western culture into what eventually became Germany, however he criticised the religious policies that came with it, claiming that even Islam would have been better than Christianity due to its meekness. He also disapproved of the archaeological projects which Himmler organized through his Ahnenerbe organization, such as excavations of pre-historic Germanic sites: "Why do we call the whole world's attention to the fact that we have no past?", in reference to Germany's lack of urban civilisation historically.

In an attempt to eventually supplant Christianity with a religion more amenable to Nazi racial theories, Himmler, together with Alfred Rosenberg, sought to replace it with Germanic paganism (the indigenous traditional religion or Volksreligion of the Germanic peoples), of which the Japanese Shinto was seen as an almost perfect East Asian counterpart. For this purpose they had ordered the construction of sites for the worship of Germanic cults in order to exchange Christian rituals for Germanic consecration ceremonies, which included different marriage and burial rites. In Heinrich Heims' Adolf Hitler, Monologe im FHQ 1941–1944 (several editions, here Orbis Verlag, 2000), Hitler is quoted as having said on 14 October 1941: "It seems to be inexpressibly stupid to allow a revival of the cult of Odin/Wotan. Our old mythology of the gods was defunct, and incapable of revival, when Christianity came...the whole world of antiquity either followed philosophical systems on the one hand, or worshipped the gods. But in modern times it is undesirable that all humanity should make such a fool of itself." This was in reference to bringing Germans back to idol worship in what Hitler saw as an era of science that would reject it.

== Establishment strategy ==
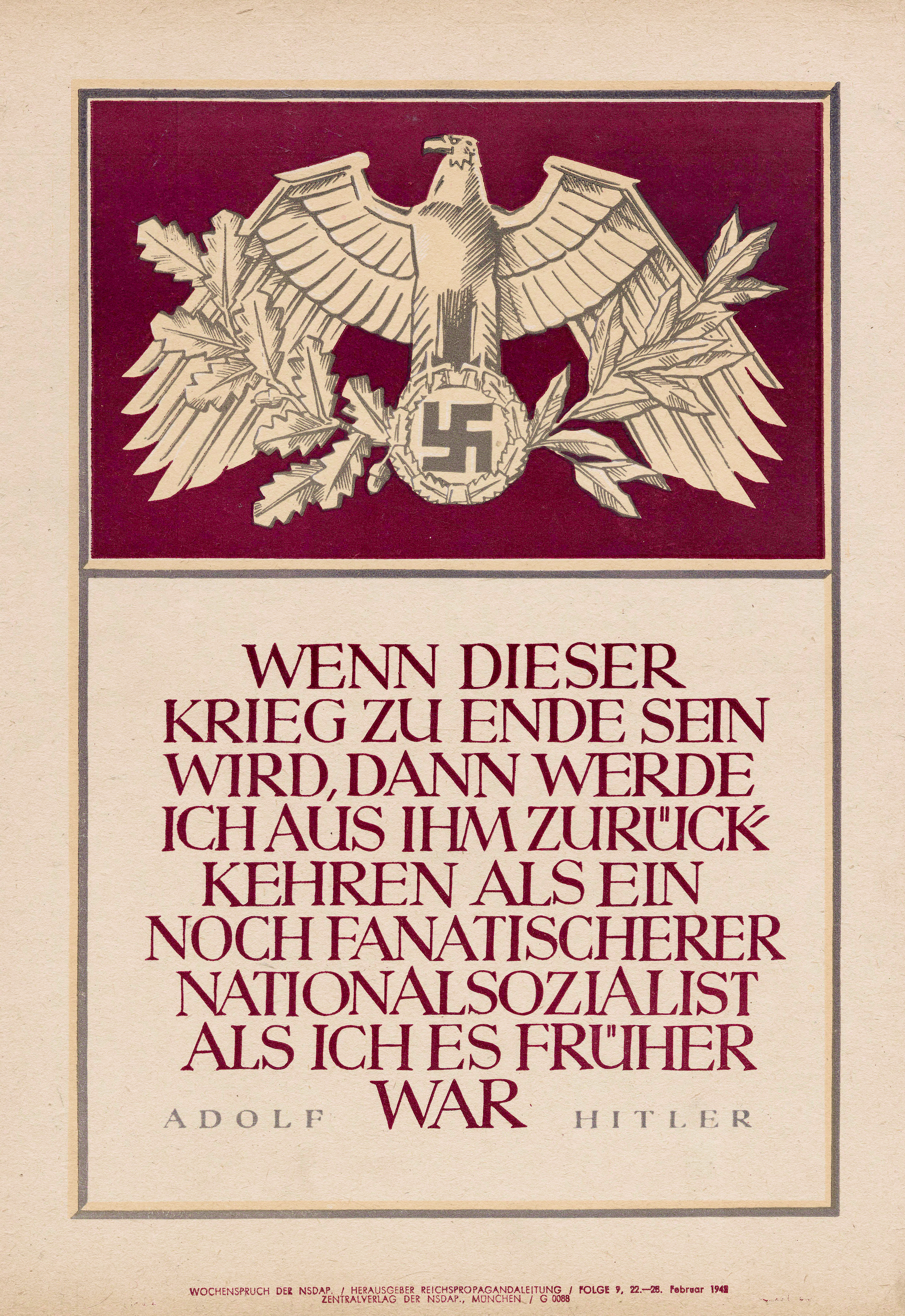
Poster from the Wochenspruch der NSDAP series, 22 February 1942. Hitler's quote reads: "When this war is over, I will return as an even more fanatic National Socialist than I was before."

The goal was first proclaimed publicly in the 1937 Nuremberg Rallies. Hitler's last speech at this event ended with the words "The German nation has after all acquired its Germanic Reich", which elicited speculation in political circles of a 'new era' in Germany's foreign policy. Several days before the event Hitler took Albert Speer aside when both were on their way to the former's Munich apartment with an entourage, and declared to him that "We will create a great empire. All the Germanic peoples will be included in it. It will begin in Norway and extend to northern Italy. (Note: This passage should in all likelihood be interpreted to mean "extending up to northern Italy", not that it would also include this region. There is no convincing evidence that Hitler intended to include any Italian provinces in the German state before 1943, including South Tyrol.) I myself must carry this out. If only I keep my health!" On April 9, 1940, as Germany invaded Denmark and Norway in Operation Weserübung, Hitler announced the establishment of the Germanic Reich: "Just as the Bismarck Empire arose from the year 1866, so too will the Greater Germanic Empire arise from this day."

"Germany decides [its future goal] to adopt a clear, farsighted policy of space. It thus turns away from all international industrial and international trade policy attempts and instead concentrates all of its strength on marking out a way of life for our people through the allocation of adequate Lebensraum for the next one hundred years. Because this space can lie only in the East, the obligation of a naval power takes a back seat. Germany again attempts to fight for its interests by forming a decisive power on land. This goal corresponds equally to the highest national and ethnic requirements."

— Adolf Hitler describing his agenda of German expansionism, Hitlers Zweites Buch p.159

The establishment of the empire was to follow the model of the Austrian Anschluss of 1938, just carried out on a greater scale. Goebbels emphasized in April 1940 that the annexed Germanic countries would have to undergo a similar "national revolution" as Germany herself did after the Machtergreifung, with an enforced rapid social and political "co-ordination" in accordance with Nazi principles and ideology (Gleichschaltung).

The ultimate goal of the Gleichschaltung policy pursued in these parts of occupied Europe was to destroy the very concepts of individual states and nationalities, just as the concept of a separate Austrian state and national identity was repressed after the Anschluss through the establishment of new state and party districts. The new empire was to no longer be a nation-state of the type that had emerged in the 19th century, but instead a "racially pure community". It is for this reason that the German occupiers had no interest in transferring real power to the various far-right nationalist movements present in the occupied countries (such as Nasjonal Samling, the NSB, etc.) except for temporary reasons of Realpolitik, and instead actively supported radical collaborators who favored pan-Germanic unity (i.e. total integration to Germany) over provincial nationalism (for example DeVlag). Unlike Austria and the Sudetenland however, the process was to take considerably longer. Eventually these nationalities were to be merged with the Germans into a single ruling race, but Hitler stated that this prospect lay "a hundred or so years" in the future. During this interim period it was intended that the 'New Europe' would be run by Germans alone. According to Speer, while Himmler intended to eventually Germanize these peoples completely, Hitler intended not to "infringe on their individuality" (that is, their native languages), so that in the future they would "add to the diversity and dynamism" of his empire. The German language would be its lingua franca however, likening it to the status of English in the British Commonwealth.

A primary agent used in stifling the local extreme nationalist elements was the Germanic SS, which initially merely consisted of local respective branches of the Allgemeine-SS in Belgium, Netherlands and Norway. These groups were at first under the authority of their respective pro-Nazi national commanders (De Clercq, Mussert and Quisling), and were intended to function within their own national territories only. During the course of 1942, however, the Germanic SS was further transformed into a tool used by Himmler against the influence of the less extreme collaborating parties and their SA-style organizations, such as the Hird in Norway and the Weerbaarheidsafdeling in the Netherlands. In the post-war Germanic Empire, these men were to form the new leadership cadre of their respective national territories. To emphasize their pan-Germanic ideology, the Norges SS was now renamed the Germanske SS Norge, the Nederlandsche SS the Germaansche SS in Nederland and the Algemeene-SS Vlaanderen the Germaansche SS in Vlaanderen. The men of these groups no longer swore allegiance to their respective national leaders, but to the germanischer Führer ("Germanic Führer"), Adolf Hitler:

I swear to you, Adolf Hitler, as Germanic Führer, loyalty and bravery. I pledge you and the superiors which you appointed obedience until death. So help me God.

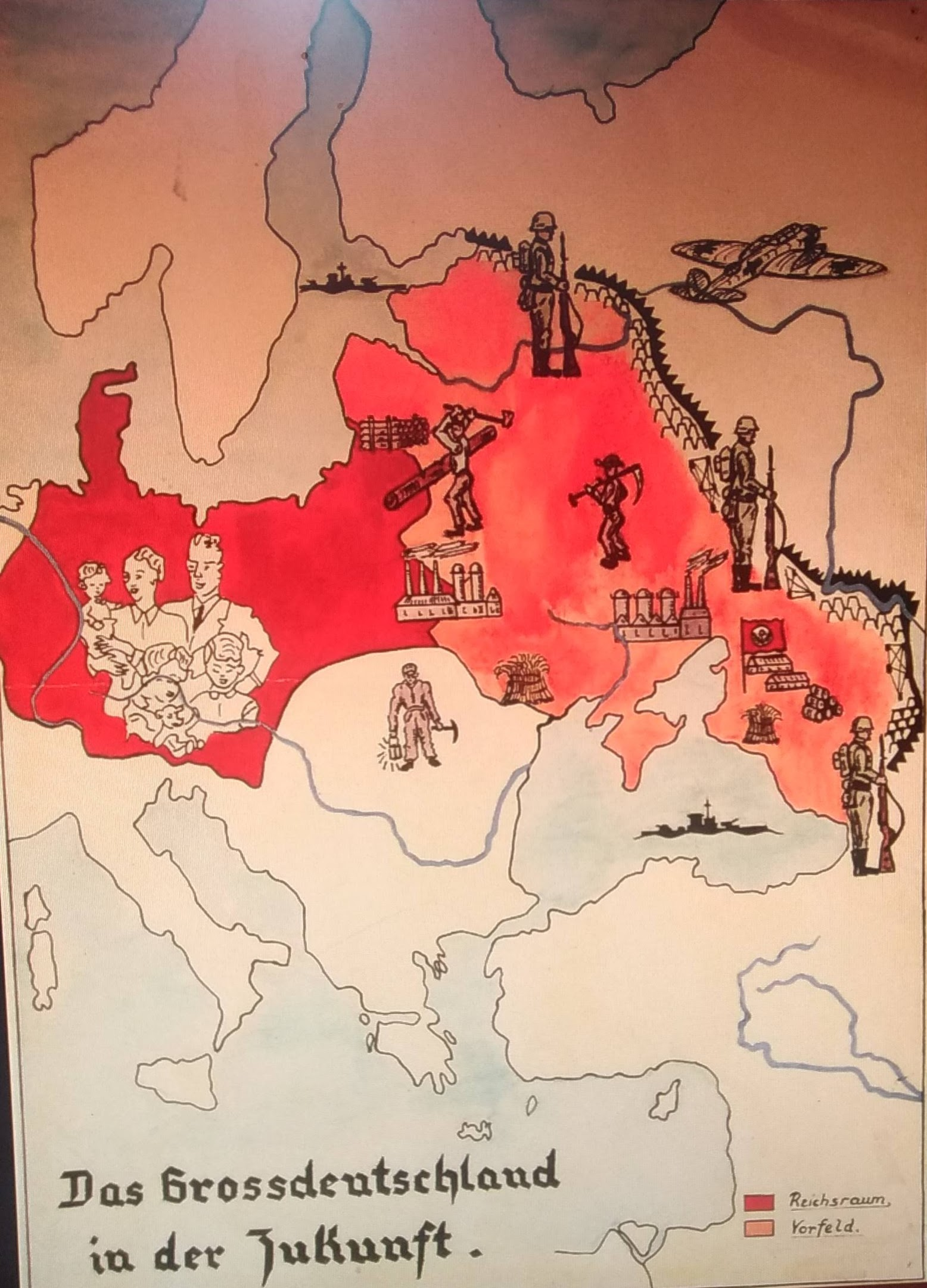
An illustration of Greater Germanic Reich suggested by Nazi authorities in the propaganda map "Das Grossdeutschland in der Zukunft" (1943). The map depicts occupied Eastern Europe as a colony of Nordic-Germanic settlers.

This title was assumed by Hitler on 23 June 1941, at the suggestion of Himmler. On 12 December 1941 the Dutch right-wing nationalist Anton Mussert also addressed him in this fashion when he proclaimed his allegiance to Hitler during a visit to the Reich Chancellery in Berlin. He had wanted to address Hitler as Führer aller Germanen ("Führer of all Germanics"), but Hitler personally decreed the former style. Historian Loe de Jong speculates on the difference between the two: Führer aller Germanen implied a position separate from Hitler's role as Führer und Reichskanzler des Grossdeutschen Reiches ("Führer and Reich Chancellor of the Greater German Reich"), while germanischer Führer served more as an attribute of that main function. As late as 1944 occasional propaganda publications continued to refer to him by this unofficial title as well however. Mussert held that Hitler was predestined to become the Führer of Germanics because of his congruous personal history: Hitler originally was an Austrian national, who enlisted in the Bavarian army and lost his Austrian citizenship. He thus remained stateless for seven years, during which, according to Mussert, he was "the Germanic leader and nothing else".

The Swastika Flag was to be used as a symbol to represent not only the Nazi Party, but also the unity of the Nordic-Germanic peoples into a single state. The swastika was seen by many Nazis as a fundamentally Germanic and European symbol despite its presence among many cultures worldwide.

Hitler had long intended to architecturally reconstruct the German capital Berlin into a new imperial metropolis, which he decided in 1942 to rename Germania upon its scheduled completion in 1950. The name was specifically chosen to make it the clear central point of the envisioned Germanic empire, and to re-enforce the notion of a united Germanic-Nordic state upon the Germanic peoples of Europe. According to records of Hitler's "table talk" of 8 June 1942:

Just as the Bavarians and the Prussians had to be impressed by Bismarck of the German idea, so too must the Germanic peoples of continental Europe be steered towards the Germanic concept. He [Hitler] even considers it good that by renaming the Reich capital Berlin into 'Germania', we'll have given considerable driving force to this task. The name Germania for the Reich capital would be very appropriate, for in spite of how far removed those belonging to the Germanic racial core will be, this capital will instill a sense of unity.

— Hitler's Table Talk, 1942

== Policies undertaken in Germanic countries ==
Germany's actual territorial control at its greatest extent during World War II (late 1942): German Reich (Note: Including the Protectorate of Bohemia and Moravia and the General Government); Civilian-administered occupied territories; Military-administered occupied territories

=== Low Countries ===
For [Hitler] it is self-evident that Belgium and Flanders and Brabant will likewise be turned into German [provinces]. The Netherlands will also not be allowed to lead a politically independent life ... Whether the Dutch offer any resistance to this or not, is fairly irrelevant.

— – Joseph Goebbels

The German plans of annexation were more advanced for the Low Countries than for the Nordic states. Luxembourg and Belgium were both formally annexed into the German Reich during World War II, in 1942 and 1944 respectively, the latter as the new Reichsgaue of Flandern and Wallonien (the proposed third one, Brabant, was not implemented in this arrangement) and a Brussels District. On April 5, 1942, while having dinner with an entourage including Heinrich Himmler, Hitler declared his intention that the Low Countries would be included whole into the Reich, at which point the Greater German Reich would be reformed into the Germanic Reich (simply "the Reich" in common parlance) to signify this change.

In October 1940 Hitler disclosed to Benito Mussolini that he intended to leave the Netherlands semi-independent because he wanted that country to retain its overseas colonial empire after the war. This factor was removed after the Japanese took over the Netherlands East Indies, the primary component of that domain. The resulting German plans for the Netherlands suggested its transformation into a Gau Westland, which would eventually be further broken-up into five new Gaue or gewesten (historical Dutch term for a type of sub-national polity). Fritz Schmidt, a ranking German official in the occupied Netherlands who hoped to become the Gauleiter of this new province on Germany's western periphery stated that it could even be called Gau Holland, as long as the Wilhelmus (the Dutch national anthem) and similar patriotic symbols were to be forbidden. Rotterdam, which had actually been largely destroyed in the course of the 1940 invasion was to be rebuilt as the most important port-city in the "Germanic area" due to its situation at the mouth of the Rhine river.

Himmler's personal masseur Felix Kersten claimed that the former even contemplated resettling the entire Dutch population, some 8 million people in total at the time, to agricultural lands in the Vistula and Bug River valleys of German-occupied Poland as the most efficient way of facilitating their immediate Germanization. In this eventuality he is alleged to have further hoped to establish an SS Province of Holland in vacated Dutch territory, and to distribute all confiscated Dutch property and real estate among reliable SS-men. However this claim was shown to be a myth by Loe de Jong in his book Two Legends of the Third Reich.

The position in the future empire of the Frisians, another Germanic people, was discussed on 5 April 1942 in one of Hitler's many wartime dinner-conversations. Himmler commented that there was ostensibly no real sense of community between the different indigenous ethnic groups in the Netherlands. He then stated that the Dutch Frisians in particular seemed to hold no affection for being part of a nation-state based on the Dutch national identity, and felt a much greater sense of kinship with their German Frisian brethren across the Ems River in East Frisia, an observation Field Marshal Wilhelm Keitel agreed with based on his own experiences. Hitler determined that the best course of action in that case would be to unite the two Frisian regions on both sides of the border into a single province, and would at a later point in time further discuss the topic with Arthur Seyss-Inquart, the governor of the German regime in the Netherlands. By late May of that year these discussions were apparently concluded, as on the 29th he pledged that he would not allow the West-Frisians to remain part of Holland, and that since they were "part of the exact same race as the people of East Frisia" had to be joined into one province.

Hitler considered Wallonia to be "in reality German lands" which were gradually detached from the Germanic territories by the French Romanization of the Walloons, and that Germany thus had "every right" to take these back. Before the decision was made to include Wallonia in its entirety, several smaller areas straddling the traditional Germanic-Romance language border in Western Europe were already considered for inclusion. These included the small Lëtzebuergesh-speaking area centred on Arlon, as well as the Low Dietsch-speaking region west of Eupen (the so-called Platdietse Streek) around the city of Limbourg, historical capital of the Duchy of Limburg.

=== Nordic countries ===
After their invasion in Operation Weserübung, Hitler vowed that he would never again leave Norway, and favored annexing Denmark as a German province even more due to its small size and relative closeness to Germany. Himmler's hopes were an expansion of the project so that Iceland would also be included among the group of Germanic countries which would have to be gradually incorporated into the Reich. He was also among the group of more esoteric Nazis who believed either Iceland or Greenland to be the mystical land of Thule, a purported original homeland of the ancient Aryan race. From a military point of view, the Kriegsmarine command hoped to see the Spitsbergen, Iceland, Greenland, the Faroe Isles and possibly the Shetland Isles (which were also claimed by the Quisling regime) under its domination to guarantee German naval access to the mid-Atlantic.

There was preparation for the construction of a new German metropolis of 300,000 inhabitants called Nordstern ("North Star") next to the Norwegian city of Trondheim. It would be accompanied by a new naval base that was intended to be Germany's largest. This city was to be connected to Germany proper by an Autobahn across the Little and Great Belts. It would also house an art museum for the northern part of the Germanic empire, housing "only works of German artists."

Sweden's future subordination into the 'New Order' was considered by the regime. Himmler stated that the Swedes were the "epitome of the Nordic spirit and the Nordic man", and looked forward to incorporating central and southern Sweden to the Germanic Empire. Himmler offered northern Sweden, with its Finnish minority, to Finland, along with the Norwegian port of Kirkenes, although this suggestion was rejected by Finnish Foreign Minister Witting. Felix Kersten claimed that Himmler had expressed regret that Germany had not occupied Sweden during Operation Weserübung, but was certain that this error was to be rectified after the war. In April 1942, Goebbels expressed similar views in his diary, writing that Germany should have occupied the country during its campaign in the north, as "this state has no right to national existence anyway". In 1940, Hermann Göring suggested that Sweden's future position in the Reich was similar to that of Bavaria in the German Empire. The ethnically Swedish Åland Islands, which were awarded to Finland by the League of Nations in 1921, were likely to join Sweden in the Germanic Empire. In the spring of 1941, the German military attaché in Helsinki reported to his Swedish counterpart that Germany would need transit rights through Sweden for the imminent invasion of the Soviet Union, and in the case of finding her cooperative would permit the Swedish annexation of the islands. Hitler did veto the idea of a complete union between the two states of Sweden and Finland, however.

Despite the majority of its people being of Finnic origin, Finland was given the status of being an "honorary Nordic nation" (from a Nazi racial perspective, not a national one) by Hitler as reward for its military importance in the ongoing conflict against the Soviet Union. The Swedish-speaking minority of the country, who in 1941 comprised 9.6% of the total population, were considered Nordic and were initially preferred over Finnish speakers in recruitment for the Finnish Volunteer Battalion of the Waffen-SS. Finland's Nordic status did not mean however that it was intended to be absorbed into the Germanic Empire, but instead expected to become the guardian of Germany's northern flank against the hostile remnants of a conquered USSR by attaining control over Karelian territory, occupied by the Finns in 1941. Hitler also considered the Finnish and Karelian climates unsuitable for German colonization. Even so, the possibility of Finland's eventual inclusion as a federated state in the empire as a long-term objective was mulled over by Hitler in 1941, but by 1942 he seems to have abandoned this line of thinking. According to Kersten, as Finland signed an armistice with the Soviet Union and broke off diplomatic relations with her former brother-in-arms Germany in September 1944, Himmler felt remorse for not eliminating the Finnish state, government and its "masonic" leadership sooner, and transforming the country into a "National Socialist Finland with a Germanic outlook".

=== Switzerland ===
The same implicit hostility toward neutral nations such as Sweden was also held towards Switzerland. Goebbels noted in his diary on December 18, 1941, that "It would be a veritable insult to God if they [the neutrals] would not only survive this war unscathed while the major powers make such great sacrifices, but also profit from it. We will certainly make sure that this will not happen."

The Swiss people were seen by Nazi ideologists as a mere offshoot of the German nation, although one led astray by decadent Western ideals of democracy and materialism. Hitler decried the Swiss as "a misbegotten branch of our Volk" and the Swiss state as "a pimple on the face of Europe" deeming them unsuitable for settling the territories that the Nazis expected to colonize in Eastern Europe.

Himmler discussed plans with his subordinates to integrate at least the German-speaking parts of Switzerland completely with the rest of Germany, and had several persons in mind for the post of a Reichskommissar for the 're-union' of Switzerland with the German Reich (in analogy to the office that Josef Bürckel held after Austria's absorption into Germany during the Anschluss). Later this official was to subsequently become the new Reichsstatthalter of the area after completing its total assimilation. In August 1940, Gauleiter of Westfalen-South Josef Wagner and the Minister-President of Baden Walter Köhler spoke in favor of the amalgamation of Switzerland to Reichsgau Burgund (see below) and suggested that the seat of government for this new administrative territory should be the dormant Palace of Nations in Geneva.

Operation Tannenbaum, a military offensive intended to occupy all of Switzerland, most likely in co-operation with Italy (which itself desired the Italian-speaking areas of Switzerland), was in the planning stages during 1940–1941. Its implementation was seriously considered by the German military after the armistice with France, but it was definitively shelved after the start of Operation Barbarossa had directed the attention of the Wehrmacht elsewhere.

=== Eastern France ===
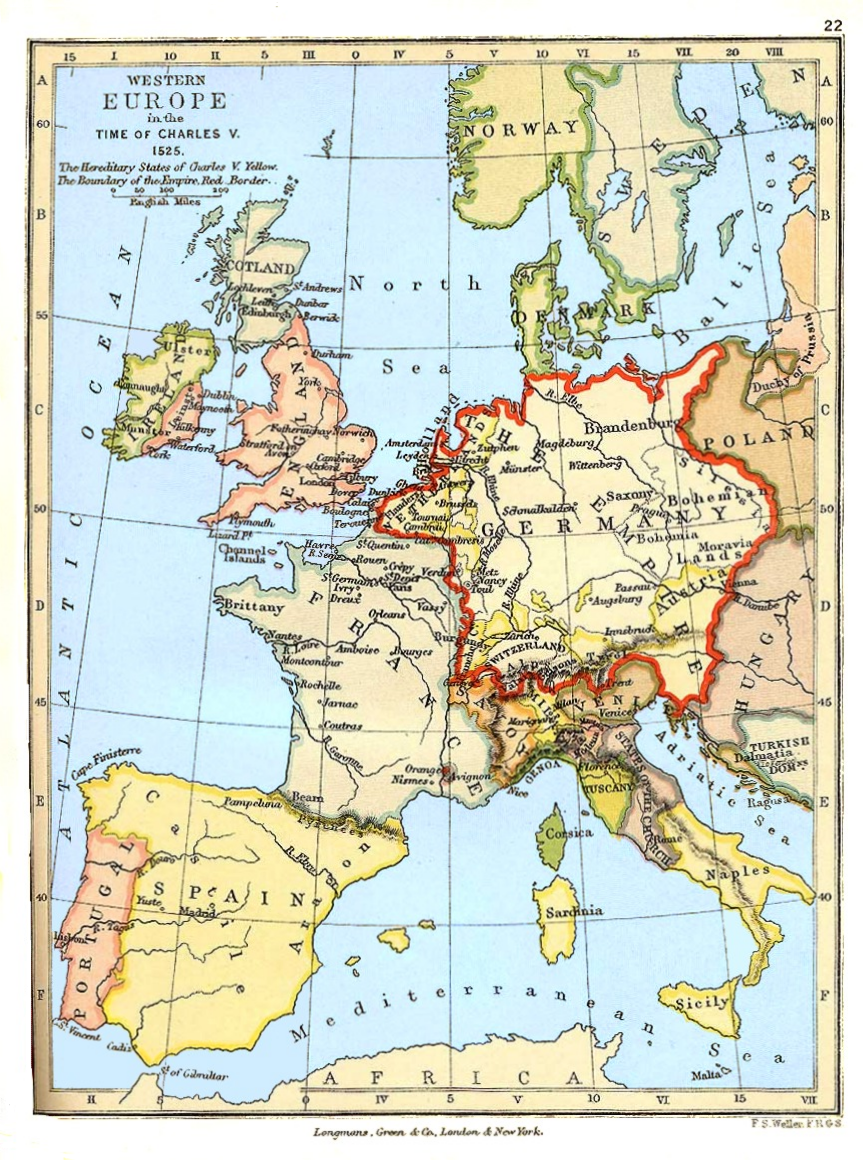
Western Europe in the time of Charles V (1525): the German part of the Holy Roman Empire is marked by the red borders.

In the aftermath of the Munich Agreement, Hitler and French Prime Minister Édouard Daladier in December 1938 made an agreement that officially declared that Germany was relinquishing its previous territorial claims on Alsace-Lorraine in the interest of maintaining peaceful relations between France and Germany and both pledged to be involved in mutual consultation on matters involving the interests of both countries. However at the same time Hitler in private advised the High Command of the Wehrmacht to prepare operational plans for a joint German–Italian war against France.

Under the auspices of State Secretary Wilhelm Stuckart the Interior Ministry produced an initial memo for the planned annexation of a strip of eastern France in June 1940, stretching from the mouth of the Somme to Lake Geneva, and on July 10, 1940, Himmler toured the region to inspect its Germanization potential. According to documents produced in December 1940, the annexed territory would consist of nine French departments, and the Germanization action would require the settlement of a million Germans from "peasant families". Himmler decided that South Tyrolean emigrants (see South Tyrol Option Agreement) would be used as settlers, and the towns of the region would receive South Tyrolean place-names such as Bozen, Brixen, Meran, and so on. By 1942 Hitler had, however, decided that the South Tyroleans would be instead used to settle the Crimea, and Himmler regretfully noted "For Burgundy, we will just have to find another [Germanic] ethnic group."

Hitler claimed French territory even beyond the historical border of the Holy Roman Empire. He stated that in order to ensure German hegemony on the continent, Germany must "also retain military strong points on what was formerly the French Atlantic coast" and emphasized that "nothing on earth would persuade us to abandon such safe positions as those on the Channel coast, captured during the campaign in France and consolidated by the Organisation Todt." Several major French cities along the coast were given the designation Festung ("fortress"; "stronghold") by Hitler, such as Le Havre, Brest and St. Nazaire, suggesting that they were to remain under permanent post-war German administration.

However the war ends, France will have to pay dearly, for she caused and started it. She is now being thrown back to her borders of AD 1500. This means that Burgundy will again become part of the Reich. We shall thereby win a province that so far as beauty and wealth are concerned compares more than favorably with any other German province.

— Joseph Goebbels, 26 April 1942,

=== Atlantic islands ===
During the summer of 1940, Hitler considered the possibility of occupying the Portuguese Azores, Cape Verde and Madeira and the Spanish Canary Islands to deny the British a staging ground for military actions against Nazi-controlled Europe. In September 1940, Hitler further raised the issue in a discussion with the Spanish Foreign Minister Serrano Súñer, offering now Spain to transfer one of the Canary islands to German usage for the price of French Morocco. Although Hitler's interest in the Atlantic islands must be understood from a framework imposed by the military situation of 1940, he ultimately had no plans of ever releasing these important naval bases from German control.

It had been alleged by Canadian historian Holger Herwig that both in November 1940 and May 1941, leading into and through to the period in which Japan began planning the naval attack that would bring the United States into the war, that Hitler had stated that he had a desire to "deploy long-range bombers against American cities from the Azores." Due to their location, Hitler seemed to think that a Luftwaffe airbase located on the Portuguese Azores islands were Germany's "only possibility of carrying out aerial attacks from a land base against the United States", in a period about a year before the May 1942 emergence of the Amerikabomber trans-oceanic range strategic bomber design competition.

== Role of Britain ==
=== United Kingdom ===
The one country in Europe that spoke a Germanic language and was not included in the objective of Pan-Germanic unification was the United Kingdom, in spite of its near-universal acceptance by the Nazi government as being part of the Germanic world. Leading Nordic ideologist Hans F. K. Günther theorized that the Anglo-Saxons had been more successful than the Germans in maintaining racial purity and that the coastal and island areas of Scotland, Ireland, Cornwall and Wales had received additional Nordic blood through Norse raids and colonization during the Viking Age, and the Anglo-Saxons of East Anglia and Northern England had been under Danish rule in the 9th and 10th centuries. Günther referred to this historical process as Aufnordung ("additional nordification"), which finally culminated in the Norman conquest of England in 1066. Thus, according to Günther, Britain was a nation created by struggle and the survival of the fittest among the various Aryan peoples of the isles, and was able to pursue global conquest and empire-building because of its superior racial heredity born through this development.

Hitler professed an admiration for the imperial might of the British Empire in Zweites Buch as proof of the racial superiority of the Aryan race, hoping that Germany would emulate British "ruthlessness" and "absence of moral scruples" in establishing its own colonial empire in Eastern Europe. One of his primary foreign policy aims throughout the 1930s was to establish a military alliance with both the British as well as the Italians to neutralize France as a strategic threat to German imperialist ambitions for eastward expansion into Eastern Europe.

When it became apparent to the Nazi leadership that the United Kingdom was not interested in a military alliance, anti-British policies were adopted to ensure the attainment of Germany's war aims. Even during the war however, hope remained that Britain would in time yet become a reliable German ally. Hitler preferred to see the British Empire preserved as a world power, because its break-up would benefit other countries far more than it would Germany, particularly the United States and Japan. Hitler's strategy between 1935 and 1937 for winning Britain over was based upon a German guarantee of defence towards the British Empire. After the war, Ribbentrop testified that in 1935 Hitler made a promise to deliver twelve German divisions to the disposal of Britain for maintaining the integrity of her colonial possessions.

The continued military actions against Britain after the fall of France had the strategic goal of making Britain 'see the light' and conduct an armistice with the Axis powers, with July 1, 1940, being named by the Germans as the "probable date" for the cessation of hostilities. On May 21, 1940, Franz Halder, the head of the Army General Staff, after a consultation with Hitler concerning the aims envisaged by the Führer during the present war, wrote in his diary: "We are seeking contact with Britain on the basis of partitioning the world".

One of Hitler's secondary goals for the invasion of Russia was to win over Britain to the German side. He believed that after the military collapse of the Soviet Union, "within a few weeks" Britain would be compelled either to surrender or to join Germany as a "junior partner" in the Axis. Britain's role in this alliance was reserved to support German naval and the planned Amerikabomber project against the US in a fight for world supremacy conducted from the Axis power bases of Europe, Africa and the Atlantic. On August 8, 1941, Hitler stated that he looked forward to the eventual day when "England and Germany [march] together against America", and on January 7, 1942, he daydreamed that it was "not impossible" for Britain to quit the war and join the Axis side, leading to a situation where "it will be a German-British army that will chase the Americans from Iceland". Nazi ideologist Alfred Rosenberg hoped that after the victorious conclusion of the war against the USSR, Englishmen, along with other Germanic peoples, would join the Germans in colonizing the conquered eastern territories.

From a historical perspective, Britain's situation was likened to that which the Austrian Empire found itself in after it was defeated by the Kingdom of Prussia at Königgrätz in 1866. As Austria was thereafter formally excluded from German affairs, so too would Britain be excluded from continental affairs in the event of a German victory. Yet afterwards, Austria-Hungary became a loyal ally of the German Empire in the pre-World War I power alignments in Europe, and it was hoped in vain that Britain would come to fulfill this same role for the Third Reich.

However, other evidence suggests that in the case of a successful invasion of Great Britain the occupiers' treatment of the British population may not have been as sympathetic. According to captured German documents, the commander-in-chief of the German Army, Walther von Brauchitsch, directed that "The able-bodied male population between the ages of 17 and 45 will, unless the local situation calls for an exceptional ruling, be interned and dispatched to the Continent". The remaining population would have been terrorised, including civilian hostages being taken and the death penalty immediately imposed for even the most trivial acts of resistance, with the UK being plundered for anything of financial, military, industrial or cultural value. After the war Otto Bräutigam of the Reich Ministry for the Occupied Eastern Territories wrote in his book that he had encountered a personal report by General Eduard Wagner regarding a discussion with Heinrich Himmler from February 1943, in which Himmler had expressed the intention for Einsatzgruppen to kill about 80% of the populations of France and England after the German victory. At another point, Hitler had on one occasion described the English lower classes "racially inferior".

=== Channel Islands ===
The British Channel Islands were to be permanently integrated into the Germanic Empire, and their military occupation lasted from 30 June 1940 until liberation on 9 May 1945. On July 22, 1940, Hitler stated that after the war, the islands were to be given to the control of Robert Ley's German Labour Front, and transferred into Strength Through Joy holiday resorts. German scholar Karl Heinz Pfeffer toured the islands in 1941, and recommended that the German occupiers should appeal to the islanders' Norman heritage and treat the islands as "Germanic micro-states", whose union with Britain was only an accident of history. He likened the preferred policy concerning the islands similar to the one pursued by the British in Malta, where the Maltese language had been "artificially" supported against the Italian language.

== Role of Ireland ==
A military operation plan for the invasion of Ireland in support of Operation Sea Lion was drawn up by the Germans in August 1940. Occupied Ireland was to be ruled along with Britain in a temporary administrative system divided into six military-economic commands, with one of the headquarters being situated in Dublin. Ireland's future position in the New Order is unclear, but it is known that Hitler would have united Northern Ireland with the Irish state.

== Role of Northern Italy ==
Hitler regarded northern Italians to be strongly Aryan, but not southern Italians. The Nazi regime regarded the ancient Romans to have been largely a people of the Mediterranean race; however, they claimed that the Roman ruling classes were Nordic, descended from Aryan conquerors from the North; and that this Nordic Aryan minority was responsible for the rise of Roman civilization. The Nazis viewed the downfall of the Roman Empire as being the result of the deterioration of the purity of the Nordic Aryan ruling class through its intermixing with the inferior Mediterranean types that led to the empire's decay. In addition, racial intermixing in the population in general was also blamed for Rome's downfall, claiming that Italians were a hybrid of races, including black African races. Due to the darker complexion of Mediterranean peoples, Hitler regarded them as having traces of Negroid blood and therefore did not have strong Nordic Aryan heritage and were thus inferior to those that had stronger Nordic heritage.

Hitler held immense admiration for the Roman Empire and its legacy. The Nazis ascribed the great achievements of post-Roman era northern Italians to the presence of Nordic racial heritage in such people who via their Nordic heritage had Germanic ancestors, such as German Foreign Affairs official Alfred Rosenberg recognizing Michelangelo and Leonardo da Vinci as exemplary Nordic men of history. German official Hermann Hartmann wrote that Italian scientist Galileo Galilei was clearly Nordic with deep Germanic roots because of his blond hair, blue eyes, and long face. Nazi scholars viewed the Ladin and Friulian minorities of Northern Italy as being racially, historically and culturally a part of the Germanic world. Hitler viewed Germans as closely linked with Italians:

From the cultural point of view, we are more closely linked with the Italians than with any other people. The art of Northern Italy is something we have in common with them: nothing but pure Germans. The objectionable Italian type is found only in the South, and not everywhere even there. We also have this type in our own country. When I think of them: Vienna-Ottakring, Munich-Giesing, Berlin-Pankow ! If I compare the two types, that of these degenerate Italians and our type, I find it very difficult to say which of the two is the more antipathetic.

The Nazi regime's stances in regards to northern Italy was influenced by the regime's relations with the Italian government, and particularly Mussolini's Fascist regime. Hitler deeply admired and emulated Mussolini and emphasized the racial closeness of his ally Mussolini to Germans of Alpine racial heritage. Other Nazis had negative views of Mussolini and the Fascist regime. The Nazi Party's first leader, Anton Drexler was one of the most extreme in his negative views of Mussolini – claiming that Mussolini was "probably" a Jew and that Fascism was a Jewish movement. In addition there was a perception in Germany of Italians being racially weak, feckless, corrupt and corrupting, bad soldiers as perceived as demonstrated at the Battle of Caporetto in World War I, for being part of the powers that established the Treaty of Versailles, and for being a treacherous people given Italy's abandonment of the Triple Alliance with Germany and Austria-Hungary in World War I to join the Entente. Hitler responded to the review of Italy betraying Germany and Austria-Hungary in World War I by saying that this was a consequence of Imperial Germany's decision to focus its attention on upholding the moribund Austro-Hungarian empire while ignoring and disregarding the more promising Italy.

The region of South Tyrol had been a place of contending claims and conflict between German nationalism and Italian nationalism. One of the leading founders of Italian nationalism, Giuseppe Mazzini, along with Ettore Tolomei, claimed that the German-speaking South Tyrolian population were in fact mostly a Germanicized population of Roman origin who needed to be "liberated and returned to their rightful culture". With the defeat of Austria-Hungary in World War I, the peace treaty designated to Italy the South Tyrol, with its border with Austria along the Brenner Pass. The Italian Fascist regime pursued Italianization of South Tyrol, by restricting use of the German language while promoting the Italian language; promoting mass migration of Italians into the region, encouraged mainly through industrialization; and resettlement of the German-speaking population.

After Mussolini had made clear in 1922 that he would never give up the region of South Tyrol from being in Italy, Hitler accepted this. Hitler in Mein Kampf had declared that concerns over the rights of Germans in South Tyrol under Italian sovereignty was a non-issue considering the advantages that would be gained from a German-Italian alliance with Mussolini's Fascist regime. In Mein Kampf Hitler also made clear that he was opposed to having a war with Italy for the sake of obtaining South Tyrol. This position by Hitler of abandoning German land claims to South Tyrol produced aggravation among some Nazi Party members who up to the late 1920s found it difficult to accept the position.

On 7 May 1938, Hitler during a public visit to Rome declared his commitment to the existing border between Germany (that included Austria upon the Anschluss) and Italy at the Brenner Pass. In 1939, Hitler and Mussolini resolved the problem of self-determination of Germans and maintaining the Brenner Pass frontier by an agreement in which German South Tyroleans were given the choice of either assimilation into Italian culture, or leave South Tyrol for Germany; most opted to leave for Germany.

After King Victor Emmanuel III of the Kingdom of Italy removed Mussolini from power, Hitler on 28 July 1943 was preparing for the expected abandonment of the Axis for the Allies by the Kingdom of Italy's new government, and was preparing to exact retribution for the expected betrayal by planning to partition Italy. In particular Hitler was considering the creation of a "Lombard State" in northern Italy that would be incorporated into the Greater Germanic Reich, while South Tyrol and Venice would be annexed directly into Germany.

In the aftermath of the Kingdom of Italy's abandonment of the Axis on 8 September 1943, Germany seized and de facto incorporated Italian territories into its direct control.

According to Goebbels in his personal diary on 29 September 1943, Hitler had expressed the idea that the Italian-German border should extend to include the region of Veneto, after the Kingdom of Italy capitulated to the Allies in September 1943. Veneto was to be made part of the Reich in an "autonomous form", and to benefit from the post-war influx of German tourists. At the time when Italy was on the verge of declaring an armistice with the Allies, Himmler declared to Felix Kersten that Northern Italy, along with the Italian-speaking part of Switzerland, was "bound to eventually be included in Greater Germany anyway".

Whatever was once an Austrian possession we must get back into our own hands. The Italians by their infidelity and treachery have lost any claim to a national state of the modern type.

— Joseph Goebbels, September 1943,

Hitler declared in private talks that the modern Reich should emulate the racial policy of the old Holy Roman Empire, by annexing the Italian lands and especially Lombardy, whose population had well preserved their original Germanic Aryan character, unlike the lands of East Europe, with its racially alien population, scarcely marked by a Germanic contribution.

After the rescue of Mussolini and the establishment of the Italian Social Republic (RSI), in spite of urging by local German officials, Hitler refused to officially annex South Tyrol, instead he decided that the RSI should hold official sovereignty over these territories, and forbade all measures that would give the impression of official annexation of South Tyrol. However, in practice the territory of South Tyrol within the boundaries defined by Germany as Operationszone Alpenvorland that included Trent, Bolzano, and Belluno, were de facto incorporated into Germany's Reichsgau Tirol-Vorarlberg and administered by its Gauleiter Franz Hofer. While the region identified by Germany as Operationszone Adriatisches Küstenland that included Udine, Gorizia, Trieste, Pola, Fiume (Rijeka), and Ljubljana were de facto incorporated into Reichsgau Kärnten and administered by its Gauleiter Friedrich Rainer.

In a supplementary OKW order dated 10 September 1943, Hitler decrees on the establishment of further Operational Zones in Northern Italy, which were the stretch all the way to the French border. Unlike Alpenvorland and Küstenland, these zones did not immediately receive high commissioners (oberster kommissar) as civilian advisors, but were military regions where the commander was to exercise power on behalf of Army Group B. Operation zone Nordwest-Alpen or Schweizer Grenze was located between the Stelvio Pass and Monte Rosa and was to contain wholly the Italian provinces of Sondrio and Como and parts of the provinces of Brescia, Varese, Novara, and Vercelli. The zone of Französische Grenze was to encompass areas west of Monte Rosa and was to incorporate the province of Aosta and a part of the province of Turin, and presumably also the provinces of Cuneo and Imperia.

From Autumn 1943 onward, members of the Ahnenerbe, associated with the SS, asserted that archaeological evidence of ancient farmsteads and architecture proved the presence of Nordic-Germanic peoples in the region of South Tyrol in the Neolithic era including prototypical Lombard style architecture, the significance of ancient Nordic-Germanic influence on Italy, and most importantly that South Tyrol by its past and present and historic racial and cultural circumstances, was "Nordic-Germanic national soil".

== Expected participation in the colonization of Eastern Europe ==
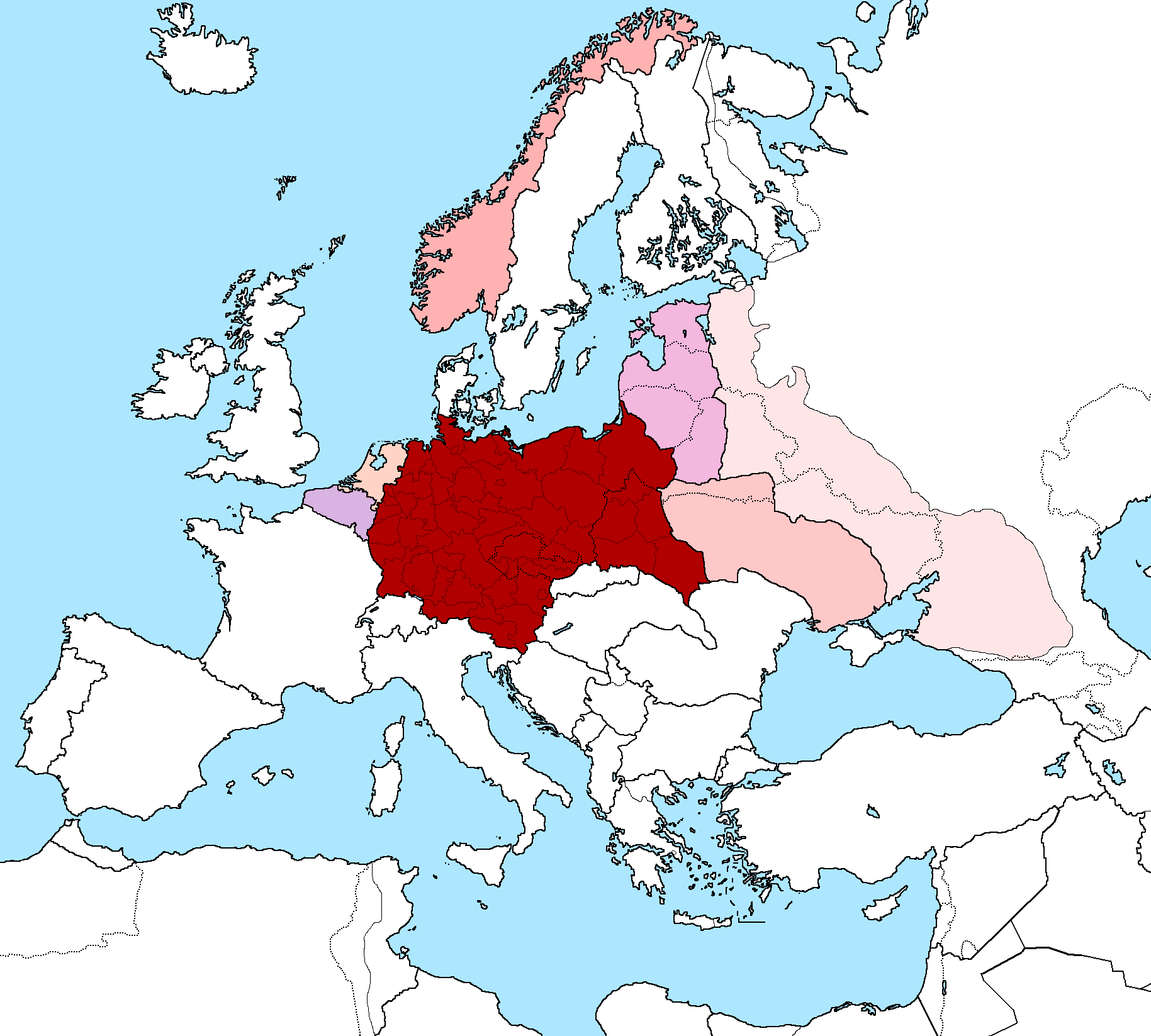
Großdeutsches Reich in 1942, with Reichskommissariat Ostland (upper centre), Reichskommissariat Ukraine (lower right) and (never fully realized) Reichskommissariat Moskowien

Despite the pursued aim of pan-Germanic unification, the primary goal of the German Reich's territorial expansionism was to acquire sufficient Lebensraum (living space) in Eastern Europe for the Germanic übermenschen or superior humans. The primary objective of this aim was to transform Germany into a complete economic autarky, the end-result of which would be a state of continent-wide German hegemony over Europe. This was to be accomplished through the enlargement of the territorial base of the German state and the expansion of the German population, and the wholesale extermination of the indigenous Slavic inhabitants and the Germanisation of Baltic inhabitants.

[on German colonization of Russia] As for the two or three million men whom we need to accomplish this task, we will find them more quickly than we think. They will come from Germany, Scandinavia, the western countries, and America. I shall no longer be here to see all that, but in twenty years the Ukraine will already be a home for twenty million inhabitants besides the natives.

— Adolf Hitler,

Because of their perceived racial worth, the NSDAP leadership was enthusiastic at the prospect of "recruiting" people from the Germanic countries to also settle these territories after the Slavic inhabitants would have been driven out. The racial planners were partly motivated in this because studies indicated that Germany would likely not be able to recruit enough colonial settlers for the eastern territories from its own country and other Germanic groups would therefore be required. Hitler insisted however that German settlers would have to dominate the newly colonized areas. Himmler's original plan for the Hegewald settlement was to settle Dutch and Scandinavians there in addition to Germans, which was unsuccessful.

== See also ==
- Administrative divisions of Nazi Germany
- Areas annexed by Nazi Germany – European lands annexed by Germany before and during WWII
- Fourth Reich – Hypothetical successor of Nazi Germany
- German-occupied Europe – Aspect of World War II
- Greater East Asia Co-Prosperity Sphere – World War II era Pan-Asian union under the Empire of Japan
- Hypothetical Axis victory in World War II – Alternate history scenario
- Italian imperialism under fascism – Aspect of politics in Fascist Italy
- Japanese colonial empire – Japanese territorial conquests (1895–1945)
- Kleindeutschland and Grossdeutschland – Mid-19th century debate about the unification of Germany
- Latin Bloc (proposed alliance)
- Lebensraum – 1890s–1940s German expansionist concept
- Pan movements – Nationalism beyond national boundaries
- Plans for North America
- Racial policy of Nazi Germany – Set of laws implemented in Nazi Germany
- Spazio vitale – Italian fascist expansionist political project
