= Administrative divisions of Nazi Germany =

De facto administrative divisions of Nazi Germany in 1944

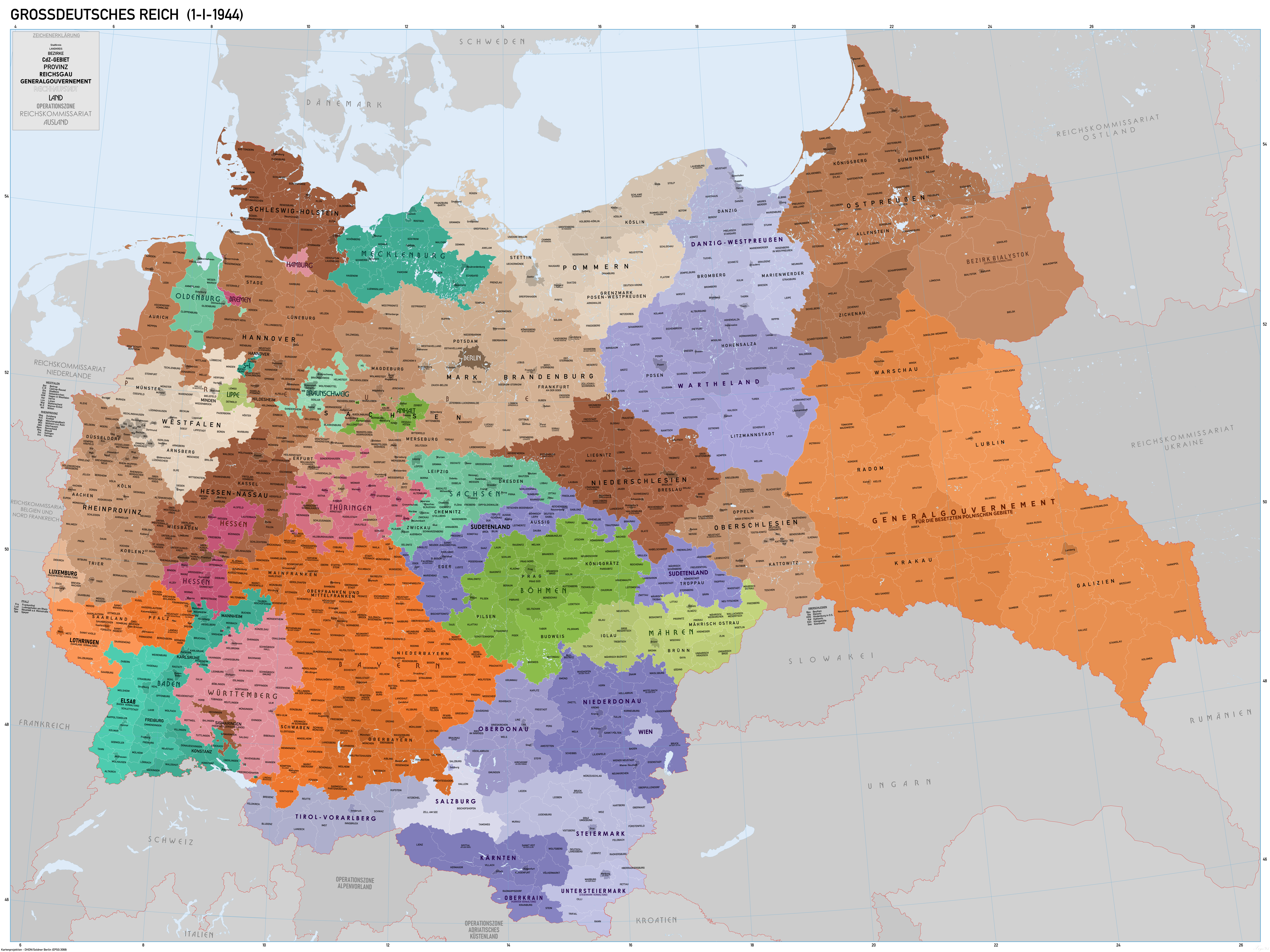
De jure administrative divisions of Nazi Germany in 1944

Länder (states) of Weimar Germany, 1918–1937

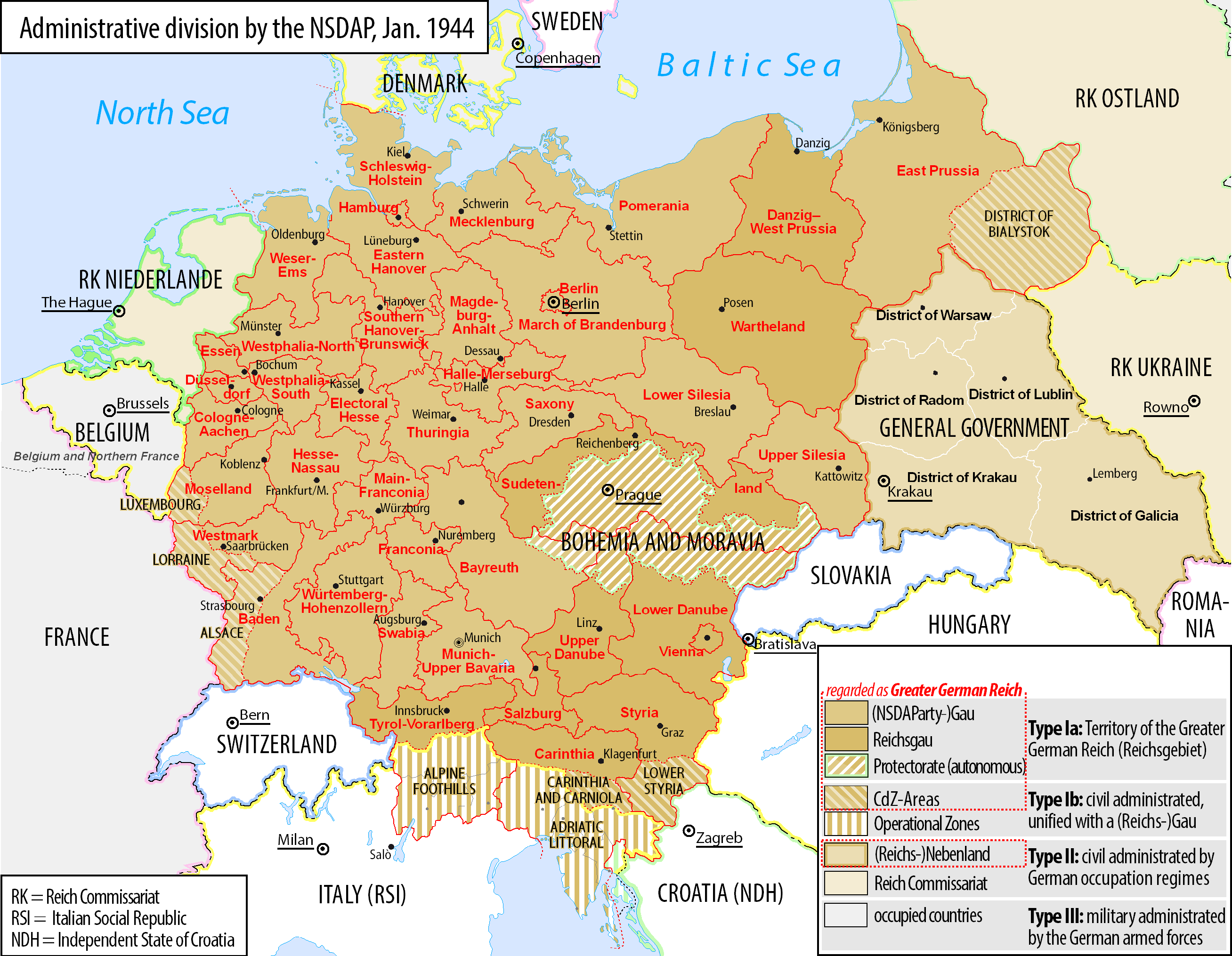
Map of NS administrative division in 1944

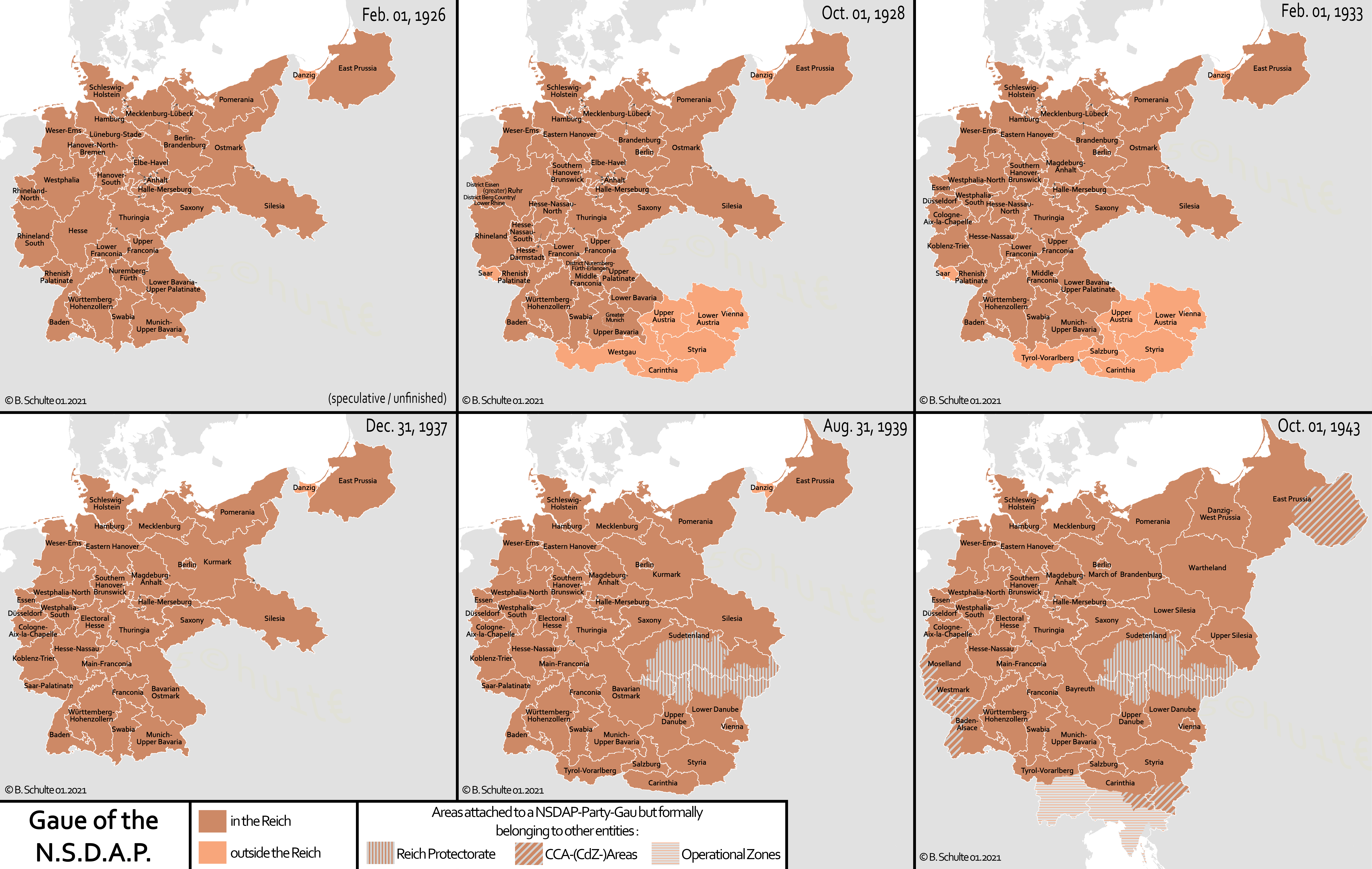
Gaue of the Nazi Party in 1926, 1928, 1933, 1937, 1939 and 1943

The Gaue (singular: Gau) were the main administrative divisions of Nazi Germany from 1934 to 1945.

The Gaue were formed in 1926 as Nazi Party regional districts in Weimar Germany based on the territorial changes after the First World War. The Gau system was established in 1934 as part of the Gleichschaltung process, replacing the de jure system of Länder (states) and Prussian provinces, which held no administrative purpose since the Enabling Act of 1933 and were reduced to rudimentary bodies. Each Gau was headed by an administrative leader, the Gauleiter, a high-ranking Nazi Party official with near-autocratic powers.

Germany consisted of 32 Gaue in 1934, eventually peaking at 42 Gaue with regions occupied in 1938 to early 1939 (Austria, Sudetenland, Memelland) and conquered during the Second World War incorporated into existing Gaue or organised as Reichsgaue, a special type of Gau where the Gauleiter also carried the position of Reichsstatthalter. The Gaue system was dissolved on 8 May 1945, following the surrender of Nazi Germany.

== Etymology ==
Gau is an archaic Germanic term for a region within a country, often a former or actual province, and used in Medieval times as roughly corresponding to an English shire. The term was revived by the Nazi Party in the 1920s as the name given to the regional associations of the party in Weimar Germany, based mainly along state and district lines.

== Gaue, Reichsgaue and Länder ==
The Gaue existed parallel to the German states, the Länder, and Prussian provinces throughout the Nazi period. Pro forma, the Administrative divisions of Weimar Germany were left in place. The plan to abolish the Länder was ultimately given up because Hitler shrank away from structural reforms, a so-called Reichsreform, fearing it would upset local party leaders. For the same reason, the borders of the Gaue remained unchanged within Germany throughout this time. The Gaue were only enlarged through the adding of occupied territories after 1938. While the Länder continued to exist, the real power on local level lay with the Gauleiters, not the Minister Presidents of the German states. The Gauleiters were directly appointed by Hitler and only answerable to him. In practice, interference from above was rare and their power was almost absolute.

=== Gaue established in 1934 ===
| English name | German name | Headquarters | Established | Notes |
|---|---|---|---|---|
| Baden | Baden | Karlsruhe | 1934 | Formed from the state of Baden; in 1940-45 the Gau included the former French départements of Bas-Rhin and Haut-Rhin and was renamed Baden-Elsaß |
| Bayreuth | Bayreuth | Bayreuth | 1934 | Formed from the eastern part of the state of Bavaria; originally named Bayrische Ostmark, renamed Gau Bayreuth in 1942; also incorporated parts of Czechoslovakia from 1938 |
| Cologne-Aachen | Köln-Aachen | Cologne | 1934 | Formed from the north-central part of the Prussian province of the Rhine |
| Düsseldorf | Düsseldorf | Düsseldorf | 1934 | Formed from the northern half of the Prussian province of the Rhine |
| East Prussia | Ostpreußen | Königsberg | 1934 | Formed from the Prussian Province of East Prussia; from 1939 also included territories annexed from Poland |
| Eastern Hanover | Ost-Hannover | Lüneburg | 1934 | Formed from the northern, central, and eastern parts of the Prussian Province of Hanover |
| Electoral Hesse | Kurhessen | Kassel | 1934 | Formed from the northern half of the Prussian province of Hesse-Nassau |
| Essen | Essen | Essen | 1934 | Formed from the northern tip of the Prussian province of the Rhine |
| Franconia | Franken | Nuremberg | 1934 | Formed from the central part of the state of Bavaria |
| Greater Berlin | Groß-Berlin | Berlin | 1934 | Formed from the Prussian province of Greater Berlin |
| Halle-Merseburg | Halle-Merseburg | Halle | 1934 | Formed from the southern half of the Prussian Province of Saxony |
| Hamburg | Hamburg | Hamburg | 1934 | Formed from the Free Hanseatic City of Hamburg |
| Hesse-Nassau | Hessen-Nassau | Frankfurt am Main | 1934 | Formed from the People's State of Hesse and the southern half of the Prussian province of Hesse-Nassau |
| Koblenz-Trier | Koblenz-Trier | Koblenz | 1934 | Formed from the southern half of the Prussian province of the Rhine; renamed Gau Moselland in 1942, following the incorporation of the formerly independent country of Luxembourg |
| Magdeburg-Anhalt | Magdeburg-Anhalt | Dessau | 1934 | Formed from the Free State of Anhalt and the northern half of the Prussian Province of Saxony |
| Main-Franconia | Mainfranken | Würzburg | 1934 | Formed from the northwestern part of the state of Bavaria |
| March of Brandenburg | Mark Brandenburg | Berlin | 1934 | Formed from the Prussian province of Province of Brandenburg |
| Mecklenburg | Mecklenburg | Schwerin | 1934 | Formed from the Free State of Mecklenburg-Strelitz and the Free State of Mecklenburg-Schwerin |
| Munich-Upper Bavaria | München-Oberbayern | Munich | 1934 | Formed from the southeastern part of the state of Bavaria |
| Pomerania | Pommern | Stettin | 1934 | Formed from the Prussian Province of Pomerania |
| Saar-Palatinate | Saarpfalz | Neustadt an der Weinstraße | 1934 | Formed from the Bavarian Palatinate and the Prussian Saarland; renamed Gau Westmark in 1940 after the incooperation of parts of Lorraine |
| Saxony | Sachsen | Dresden | 1934 | Formed from the state of Saxony |
| Schleswig-Holstein | Schleswig-Holstein | Kiel | 1934 | Formed from the Prussian Province of Schleswig-Holstein, the Free City of Lübeck and territory belonging to the Free State of Oldenburg |
| Silesia | Schlesien | Breslau | 1934 | Formed from the Prussian provinces of Upper Silesia (with annexed parts of Poland since 1939) and Lower Silesia. In 1938 the provinces were also united into one; in 1941 both the province and the Gau were split in two. |
| Southern Hanover-Brunswick | Südhannover-Braunschweig | Hanover | 1934 | Formed from the Free State of Brunswick and the southern and western parts of the Province of Hanover |
| Swabia | Schwaben | Augsburg | 1934 | Formed from the southwestern part of the state of Bavaria |
| Thuringia | Thüringen | Weimar | 1934 | Formed from the state of Thuringia and adjacent territory from the Prussian Province of Saxony |
| Weser-Ems | Weser-Ems | Oldenburg | 1934 | Formed from the Free State of Oldenburg (excluding outlying territories), the state Free Hanseatic City of Bremen and the far western part of the Prussian Province of Hanover |
| Westphalia-North | Westfalen-Nord | Münster | 1934 | Formed from the Free State of Lippe, the Free State of Schaumburg-Lippe and the northern half of the Prussian Province of Westphalia |
| Westphalia-South | Westfalen-Süd | Dortmund | 1934 | Formed from the southern half of the Prussian Province of Westphalia |
| Württemberg-Hohenzollern | Württemberg-Hohenzollern | Stuttgart | 1934 | Formed from the Free People's State of Württemberg and the Prussian Province of Hohenzollern |

=== Reichsgaue established in the 1930s ===
New Reichsgaue were established after the Anschluss of Austria and the incorporation of Sudetenland following the Munich Agreement. Southern parts of Czechoslovakia also gained by the Munich Agreement were not made part of Reichsgau Sudetenland, but incorporated into Reichsgaue Ostmark (formerly Austria).

| English name | German name | Headquarters | Established | Notes |
|---|---|---|---|---|
| Carinthia | Kärnten | Klagenfurt | 1938 | Formed from the former Austrian federal state of Carinthia and Eastern Tyrol, included from 1941 was Upper Carniola (German: Oberkrain), Slovenia |
| Lower Danube | Niederdonau | Krems an der Donau | 1938 | Formed from the former Austrian federal state of Niederösterreich and northern Burgenland; included from 1939 were parts of southern Moravia. In 1943 Hitler toured the Gau and told Gauleiter Hugo Jury that the capital would be Brünn (Brno) in the near future. |
| Salzburg | Salzburg | Salzburg | 1938 | Formed from the former Austrian federal state of Salzburg |
| Styria | Steiermark | Graz | 1938 | Formed from the former Austrian federal state of Styria and southern part of Burgenland; included from 1941 was Lower Styria, Slovenia. |
| Sudetenland | Sudetenland | Reichenberg | 1938 | Formed from the predominantly German speaking parts of Czechoslovakia which were ceded to Germany after the Munich Agreement |
| Tyrol-Vorarlberg | Tirol-Vorarlberg | Innsbruck | 1938 | Formed from the former Austrian federal state of Vorarlberg and the northern part of Tyrol |
| Upper Danube | Oberdonau | Linz | 1938 | Formed from the former Austrian federal state of Oberösterreich and Ausseerland, a part of Styria; included from 1939 were parts of southern Bohemia |
| Vienna | Wien | Vienna | 1938 | Formed from the former Austrian federal state of Vienna and surrounding parts of former Niederösterreich |

=== Reichsgaue established during the Second World War ===
Of the territories annexed from Poland and the Free City of Danzig in 1939, Reichsgau Wartheland and Reichsgau Danzig-West Prussia were created. Annexed territories of pre-war Poland not within these two Reichsgaue were incorporated into the neighboring Gaue East Prussia and Silesia. The Grand Duchy of Luxembourg as well as Alsace-Lorraine, annexed from pre-war France in 1940, were attached to the bordering Southwestern Gaue of Nazi Germany.

| English name | German name | Headquarters | Established | Notes |
|---|---|---|---|---|
| Danzig–West Prussia | Danzig–Westpreußen | Danzig | 1939 | Formed in the Free City of Danzig and the Polish region of the Pomeranian Voivodeship, which were both occupied by Germany in 1939, as well as the pre-1939 German Governorate of West Prussia within then East Prussia |
| Wartheland | Wartheland | Posen | 1939 | Formed primarily in the Polish region of the Poznań Voivodeship and incorporated areas of surrounding Voivodeships after the German occupation of Poland. Called Reichsgau Posen until January 1940, when it was renamed for the Warthe (Warta) river. |

=== Auslandsgau ===
There was also an extraterritorial Gau named Auslandsorganisation for party members overseas. Its headquarters were in Berlin. This Auslandsgau was considered to be the 43rd Gau of Nazi Germany.

== Protectorate of Bohemia and Moravia ==
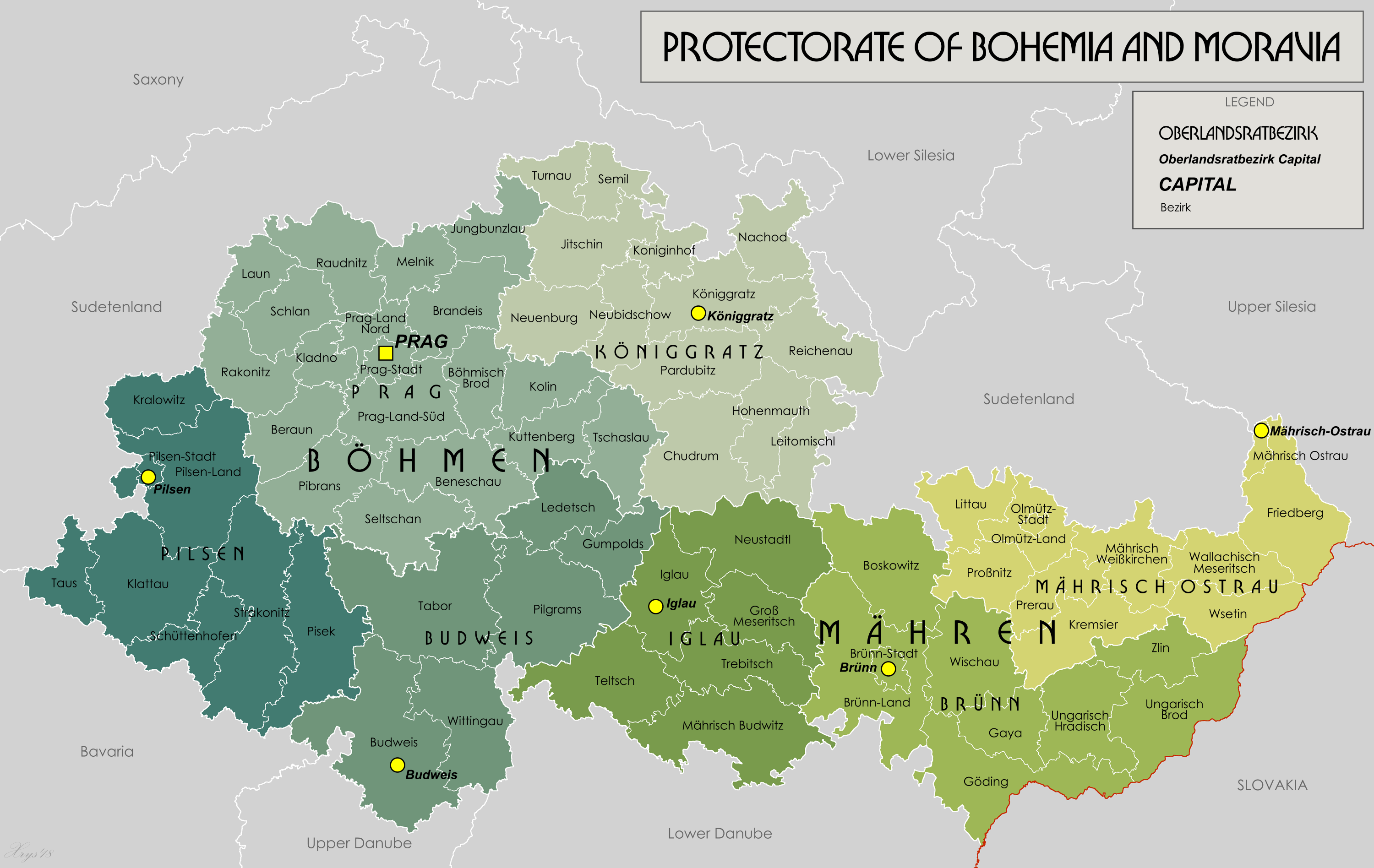
Government districts within the protectorate

On 15 March 1939, German troops invaded and occupied the rump state of Czechoslovakia that had existed after the Sudetenland had been annexed by Germany following the Munich Conference. On 16 March, Hitler signed a decree declaring the German-occupied territories of Bohemia and Moravia to be incorporated into "Greater Germany". They were not formally annexed, but were placed under the protection of Germany as the Protectorate of Bohemia and Moravia. Ethnic Germans living in the area became citizens of Germany. A separate native government was retained, but a German Reichsprotektor was appointed who wielded effective executive control over the territory.

Two separate structures for its territorial administration existed within the protectorate. Administration of the government of the protectorate was divided into two Länder (states): Bohemia and Moravia, which were in turn sub-divided into a number of smaller units. The Nazi Party divided the area into four separate party districts but, instead of creating four new Gaue, they were assigned organizationally to the surrounding Party districts: Gau Bayreuth, Reichsgau Sudetenland, Reichsgau Lower Danube and Reichsgau Upper Danube. These two separate government and party divisions continued to co-exist in the protectorate for the entire duration of its existence.

== General Government ==
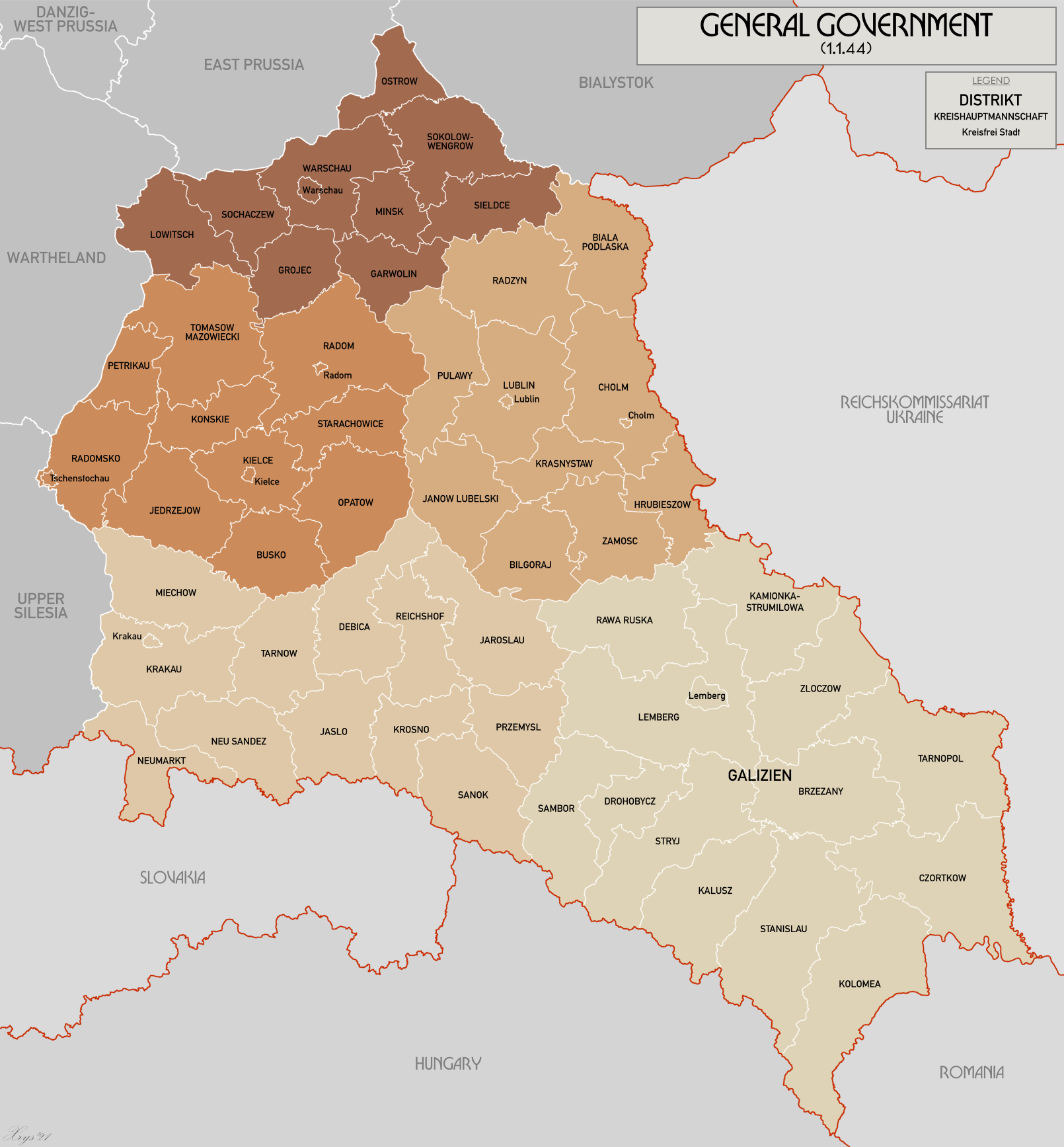
The General Government in August 1941

Following the German invasion and conquest of Poland, Hitler signed a decree on 12 October 1939, declaring that the Polish territories occupied by the Germans would be placed under the administration of a Governor-General and would be known as the General Government of the Occupied Polish Territories. This came into effect on 26 October. On 22 July 1941, following the German invasion of the Soviet Union and the occupation of Eastern Galicia, Hitler signed a decree declaring that the region would be administered by the Governor-General of Poland from 1 August.

While theoretically outside the boundaries of the Reich proper, the General Government was considered part of "Greater Germany" by Nazi officials as an "autonomous" region (i.e., not directly subordinated to the Berlin government). It was not a protectorate, but a colony, outside the Reich and its law. Its Polish inhabitants were effectively stateless and without rights.

It was sub-divided into four Distrikte (districts).

- Distrikt Krakau;
- Distrikt Warschau;
- Distrikt Lublin;
- Distrikt Radom.

After the invasion of the Soviet Union in 1941, a fifth district was added, created out of former territories of Austrian Galicia:

- Distrikt Galizien.

== Operational Zones ==
After the overthrow of Benito Mussolini, the Italian government secretly began negotiations with the Allies about Italy switching sides to the Allied camp. In retaliation the Germans occupied large parts of Italy, freed Mussolini, and re-installed him as the puppet ruler of a new fascist state in those parts that were occupied by the German Army. While officially in control over all the areas held by erstwhile Fascist Italy, large parts in the northeast located between Switzerland and the Adriatic were re-organized as Operational Zones (Operationszonen). These were informally annexed by Germany, and attached to adjacent Gaue of the Reich. There were two such Operational Zones:

| English name | German name | Headquarters | Established | Notes |
|---|---|---|---|---|
| Operational Zone of the Adriatic Littoral | Operationszone Adriatisches Küstenland (OZAK) | Triest | 1943 | Formed out of the Italian-occupied areas of Yugoslav Slovenia, the Istrian peninsula, Rijeka (Fiume), Friuli and Gorizia provinces. Attached (not incorporated) to Reichsgau Carinthia. |
| Operational Zone of the Alpine Foothills | Operationszone Alpenvorland (OZAV) | Bozen | 1943 | Formed out of former South Tyrol, Italian Trentino, and adjacent smaller parts of northeastern Italy. Attached (not incorporated) to Reichsgau Tirol-Vorarlberg. |

In a supplementary OKW order dated 10 September 1943, Hitler decrees on the establishment of further Operational Zones in Northern Italy, which were to stretch all the way to the French border. Unlike Alpenvorland and Küstenland, these zones did not immediately receive high commissioners (oberster kommissar) as civilian advisors, but were military regions where the commander was to exercise power on behalf of Army Group B. Operation zone Nordwest-Alpen (Northwest Alps) or Schweizer Grenze (Swiss Frontier) was located between the Stelvio Pass and Monte Rosa and was to contain wholly the Italian provinces of Sondrio and Como and parts of the provinces of Brescia, Varese, Novara and Vercelli. The zone of Französische Grenze (French Frontier) was to encompass areas west of Monte Rosa and was to incorporate the province of Aosta and a part of the province of Turin, and presumably also the provinces of Cuneo and Imperia.

== Planned future districts ==
The Nazi government openly pursued and practiced aggressive territorial expansionism, intending to further extend the already greatly increased territorial base of the German state. In anticipation of these expected future territorial enlargements, potential new districts were theorized upon at length by Nazi ideologists, government officials, and territorial planning departments. These expansions were intended to take place in two distinct ways:

=== Territorial expansion into Eastern Europe ===
To expand the Lebensraum of the German people, the Slavic, Baltic and other populations of Eastern Europe were intended to be wiped out through a combined process of extermination, expulsion, starvation, and enslavement that would effectively Germanize these territories in the long run. Nazi racial offices planned that the colonization with Germanic peoples of these conquered eastern territories was to proceed most intensively in the three so-called Siedlungsmarken (Settlement marches) or Reichsmarken of Ingermannland (Ingria), the Memel-Narew area, and the Southern Ukraine and the Crimean peninsula. The latter of these was intended to be newly re-organized as a Gau Gotenland (Gau of Gothland), in honour of the Crimean Goths who had at one point dwelled there. Of the Baltic countries, Peipusland was proposed as a replacement-name for Estonia, and Dünaland for Latvia.

In a conference on 16 July 1941, discussing the future organization of the conquered Soviet territories, Hitler stated his intention to turn not only the areas mentioned above but also the entire Baltic region (Reichskommissariat Ostland), the Volga German colony, and the Baku district into future Reichsgebieten (Reich territories). On 3 November 1941, he also elaborated on the toponymic aspect of Germanizing the east:

In the eastern territories I will replace the Slavic geographic names with German names. The Crimea could, for instance, be called Gotenland. [...] We need names that will confirm our rights which go back for two thousand years.

— Adolf Hitler,

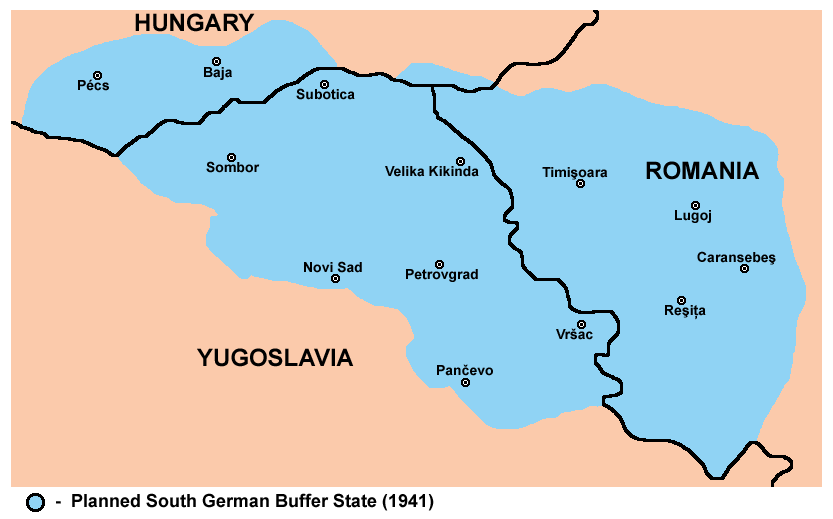
Envisaged territory of a Prinz-Eugen-Gau

The central and upper Vistula valley within the General Government were variously discussed as having to become either a single Vandalengau (Gau of the Vandals) or 3-5 other new Reichsgaue. An earlier proposal from 1939 also advocated for the creation of a Reichsgau Beskidenland, which was to stretch from the area to the west of Kraków to the San river in the east. In Axis-occupied Yugoslavia, Sepp Janko, Nazi representative of Danube Swabian interests, pushed for the establishment of a Reichsgau Banat or Prinz-Eugen-Gau, which would have encompassed the Yugoslavian territories of Bačka, Banat, parts of Transylvania (Siebenbürgen) and Baranya.

=== Annexation of the Germanic countries ===
The Nazi racial categorization of the ethnic groups of Europe classified the Northern Europeans, especially those closely related to the Germans (itself considered to be a single nationality of which Swiss and Austrians were nothing but sub-regional identities at best) such as the Dutch, the Flemings, the Danish, Norwegians, Swedish, and English as part of a superior Aryan-Nordic master race (Herrenrasse). Following the integration of Austria into Greater Germany (Großdeutschland), Hitler decided that he would follow the same policy in the future for all other countries that he regarded by virtue of their perceived racial qualifications as "belonging" to the Reich. This meant that the Low Countries, at least the German-speaking parts of Switzerland, Liechtenstein and the Scandinavian states were eventually to be annexed into a much larger Greater Germanic Reich (Großgermanisches Reich) by being broken up into smaller state and party administrative units, such as Denmark into a Gau Nordmark, and the Netherlands into a Gau Westland.

Afterwards the very notion of these countries ever having been independent or separate from the rest of the Reich was to be suppressed indefinitely. The objective called for the inauguration of a new period of rapidly enforced Gleichschaltung, the end result of which would be that aside from their local "language dialects" these countries were to become perfect duplicates of National Socialist Germany in all political and social respects.

Himmler's never-realized Project Burgund intended to revert the western borders of Germany with France to those of the late-medieval Holy Roman Empire. A strip of eastern France from the mouth of the Somme to Lake Geneva (the so-called "closed" or "forbidden" zone of German occupied France) was prepared to be annexed to the German Reich as Reichsgau Burgund, with Nancy (Nanzig) as the capital.

== See also ==
- Administrative divisions of Germany
- Administrative divisions of East Germany
- Areas annexed by Nazi Germany
- Gausturm
- List of Gauleiters
- States of the German Empire

== Sources ==
- Der große Atlas der Weltgeschichte (in German), Historical map book, published: 1990, publisher: Orbis Verlag, Munich, ISBN 3-572-04755-2
