= Herman Heukels =

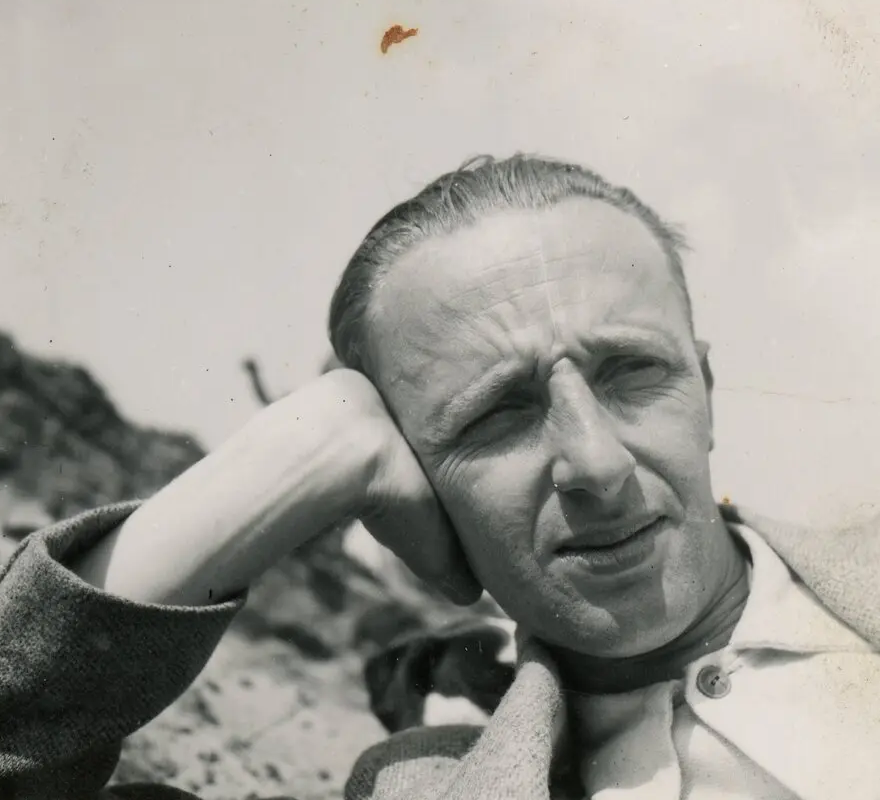
A self-portrait of Herman Heukels

Herman Heukels (8 June 1906 – 26 April 1947) was a Dutch photographer and Nazi collaborator during the German occupation of the Netherlands. Heukels' photographs are key documentation of the Holocaust in the Netherlands; his Nazi sympathies gave him access denied others. In particular, Heukels was present at the large razzia (roundup) of Dutch Jews in Amsterdam on 20 June 1943, just prior to their deportation, and took photographs of the event. That raid saw over 5,000 Jews deported from Amsterdam; most were eventually killed at Nazi concentration camps.

Herman's older brother Jan Heukels (1904–1950) was also a photographer and a fascist. Both Jan and Herman enlisted as non-German volunteers in the Waffen-SS, but only Jan was deemed suitable to stay in; Jan left for the Eastern Front to take photographs there, while Herman was pushed out. Herman still maintained connections to the NSB puppet government, and used his influential Nazi friends to plunder possessions abandoned by arrested Jews and impounded from Jewish photography businesses.

== Biography ==
The Heukels family were born and grew up in Zwolle, and lived the vast majority of their life there. Gerrit Jan Heukels (25 March 1866 – 19 August 1952) was an optician and photographer, and his children included Jan, Herman, and others. Herman was ambitious, while his older brother Jan was more relaxed and flighty. Herman helped manage and grow the family business; the family cut and sold glasses as well as photographs and photo equipment. In the 1930s, Heukels became a successful press photographer. His photos were published in illustrated magazines and books.

The brothers joined the NSB (Nationaal-Socialistische Beweging), the Dutch fascist and pro-Nazi party. The Netherlands was conquered by Germany in May 1940, upending the old order and giving great opportunity to people such as the Heukels brothers willing to collaborate. Both joined the foreign volunteers of the Waffen-SS, although Herman soon resigned from it after apparently being considered mentally unfit for the position by his superiors. Heukels still took many propaganda pictures for the Dutch Waffen-SS unit Standarte Westland, which were used to recruit young men to enlist for the SS. Jan stayed in the Waffen-SS, however, and was deployed outside the Netherlands to the war against the USSR on the Eastern Front and then later in the Italian campaign, where he served as a war correspondent (kriegsberichter) in the SS-Standarte Kurt Eggers propaganda corps.

Back in the Netherlands, Herman Heukels was involved in the "selection" of people for the arbeitseinsatz, the system of forced labor obligations for civilians. He used his connections to pounce on Jews who were departing, being arrested, or otherwise in desperate straits, and was able to snap up their property and liquidated businesses at sharp discounts. He also used his position as an excuse for petty corruption, and stole supplies. Heukels seems to have fully embraced anti-Semitism and engaged in petty acts of cruelty against the Jews knowing that he was safe from reprisal, such as sabotaging the locks of Jewish homes by night. A former Jewish resident of Zwolle where he had been a customer of Heukels' shop who had fled to Amsterdam, where he lived under a false name, was recognized by Heukels in a chance encounter; Heukels exposed him as a Jew, resulting in his death at Auschwitz.

Heukels took pictures of the deported Jews during the razzia of 20 June 1943. Heukels delivered the photographs to Werner Schröder, a Nazi administrator in Amsterdam who may have been the one to invite Heukels to the raid. He intended for his photographs to be published in Storm S.S., a Nazi propaganda weekly, although he was unsuccessful in this. German policy in the period generally preferred to avoid publishing photographs of Jews at all, clashing with this attempt to celebrate and document the deportation of the Dutch Jews.

The Nazi defeat in 1944–1945 drove Herman insane, and his later writings became regretful, confused, paranoid, and suicidal. He was interned as a collaborator after the war in 1946, serving time first at Fort Honswijk, and then at a smaller camp closer to Zwolle. He committed suicide by hanging in Oldebroek on 26 April 1947. His brother Jan died a few years later of lymphoma.

== Influence ==
Heukels' photographs were preserved and became part of the documentation of the Holocaust in the Netherlands. Despite his original intentions for them to be published in a Nazi-sympathetic weekly, Kees Ribbens of NIOD wrote that "Herman Heukels' photographs (...) were intended to illustrate the proposition that Jews were Untermenschen, inferior human beings, but ultimately those photographs became proof of the dehumanization to which Nazism inevitably led. Where Herman Heukels thought he was visualizing the superiority of the Germanic race, he was actually documenting the ruthless inhumanity of his own totalitarian world view that led to genocide."

The brothers were featured in a March 2022 biography, Wij waren supermannen ("We were Supermen"), by Dutch historian Machlien Vlasblom. Vlasblom was given access to Herman and Jan's writings by family members, providing new insight into the world of the Heukels brothers. The title comes from one of Herman's writings during his post-war imprisonment: "Wij waren supermannen. Wat is er nu van over gebleven?" ("We were supermen. What's left of it now?")

== Selected works ==
Media related to Photographs by Herman Heukels at Wikimedia Commons

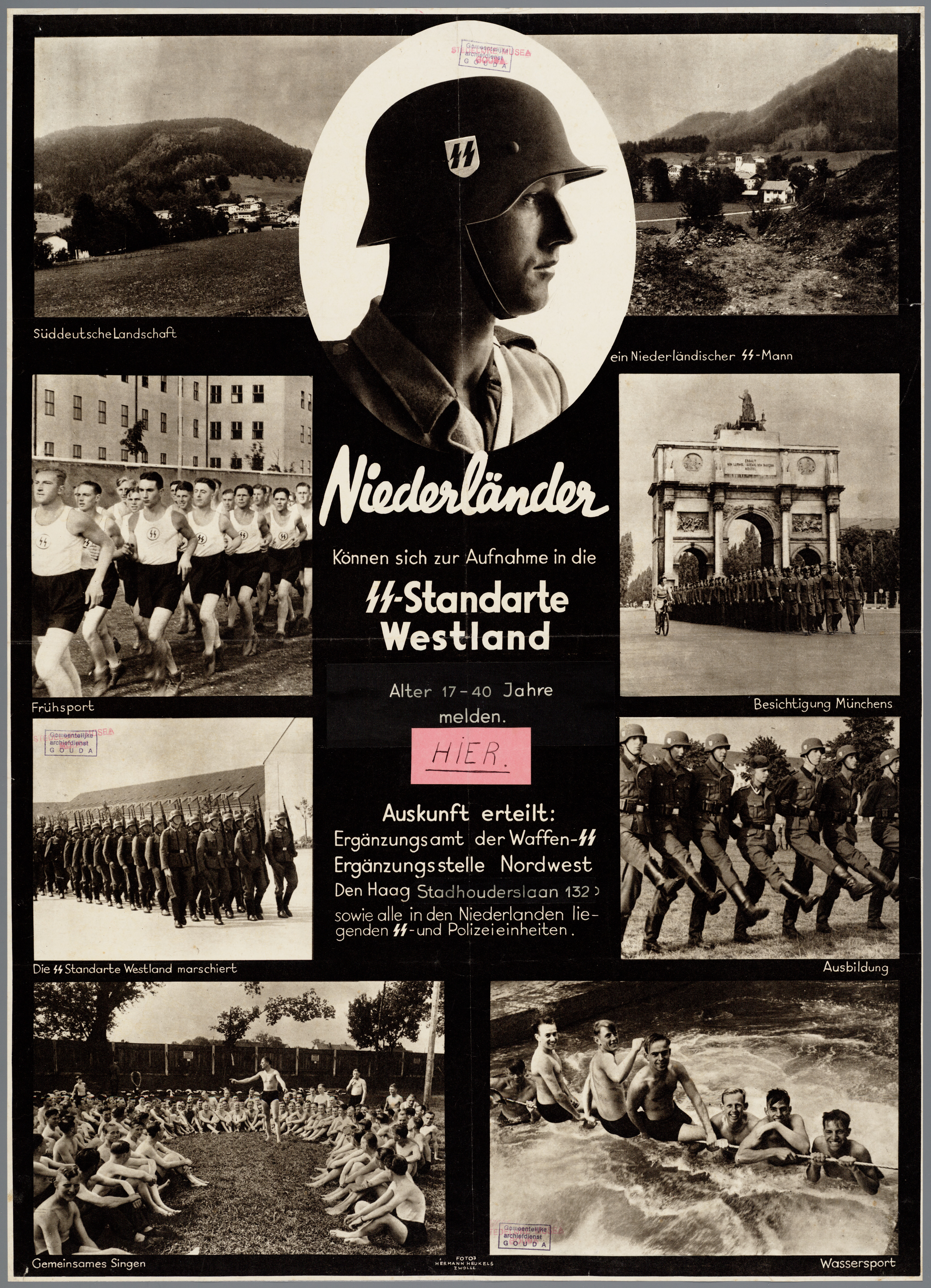
A propaganda poster produced by Heukels in 1940

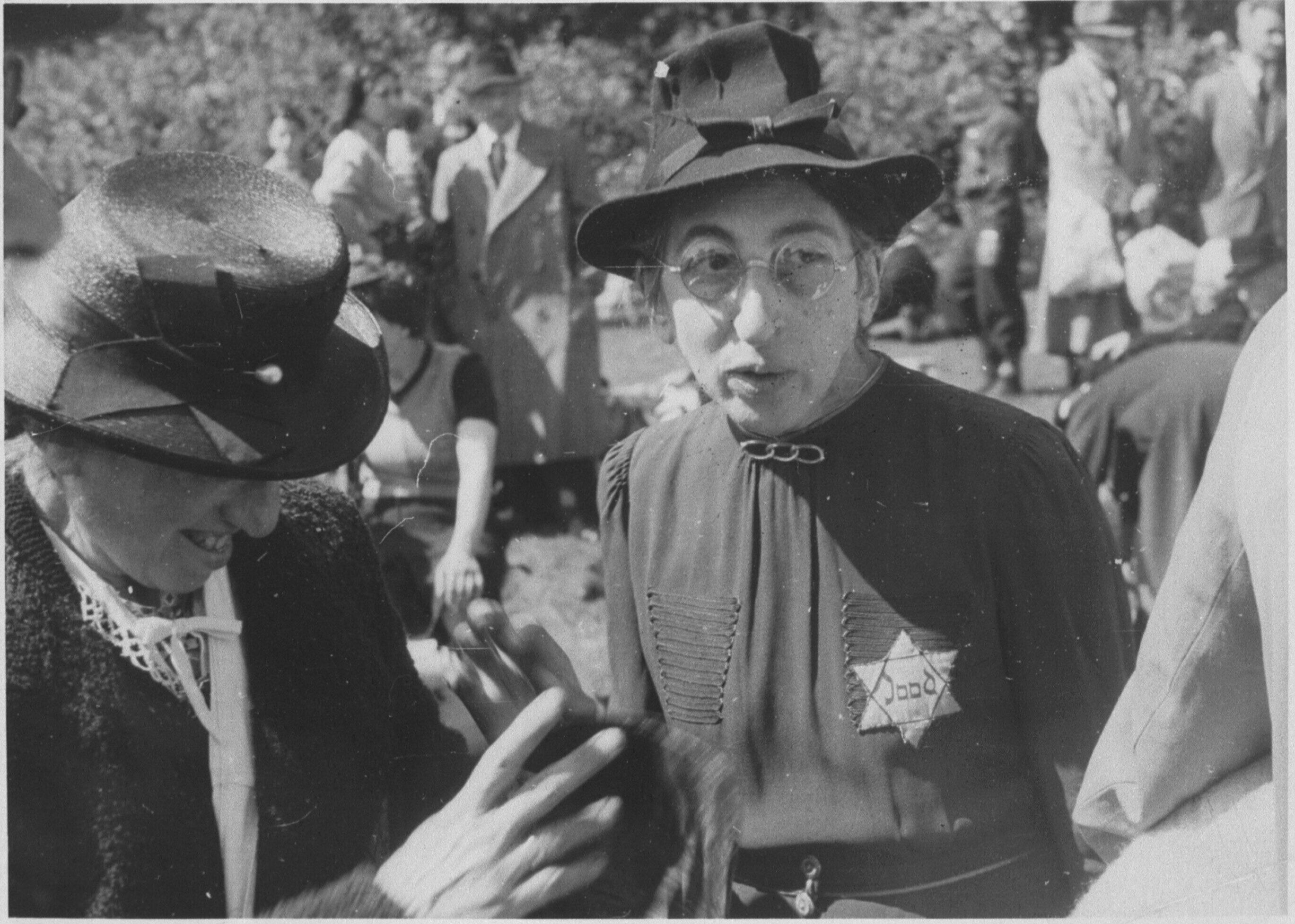
Photograph by Heukels of a Jew during the raid (razzia) of 20 June 1943 in Amsterdam. Nearly all of the over 5,000 people deported on that raid were later executed in Nazi concentration camps.

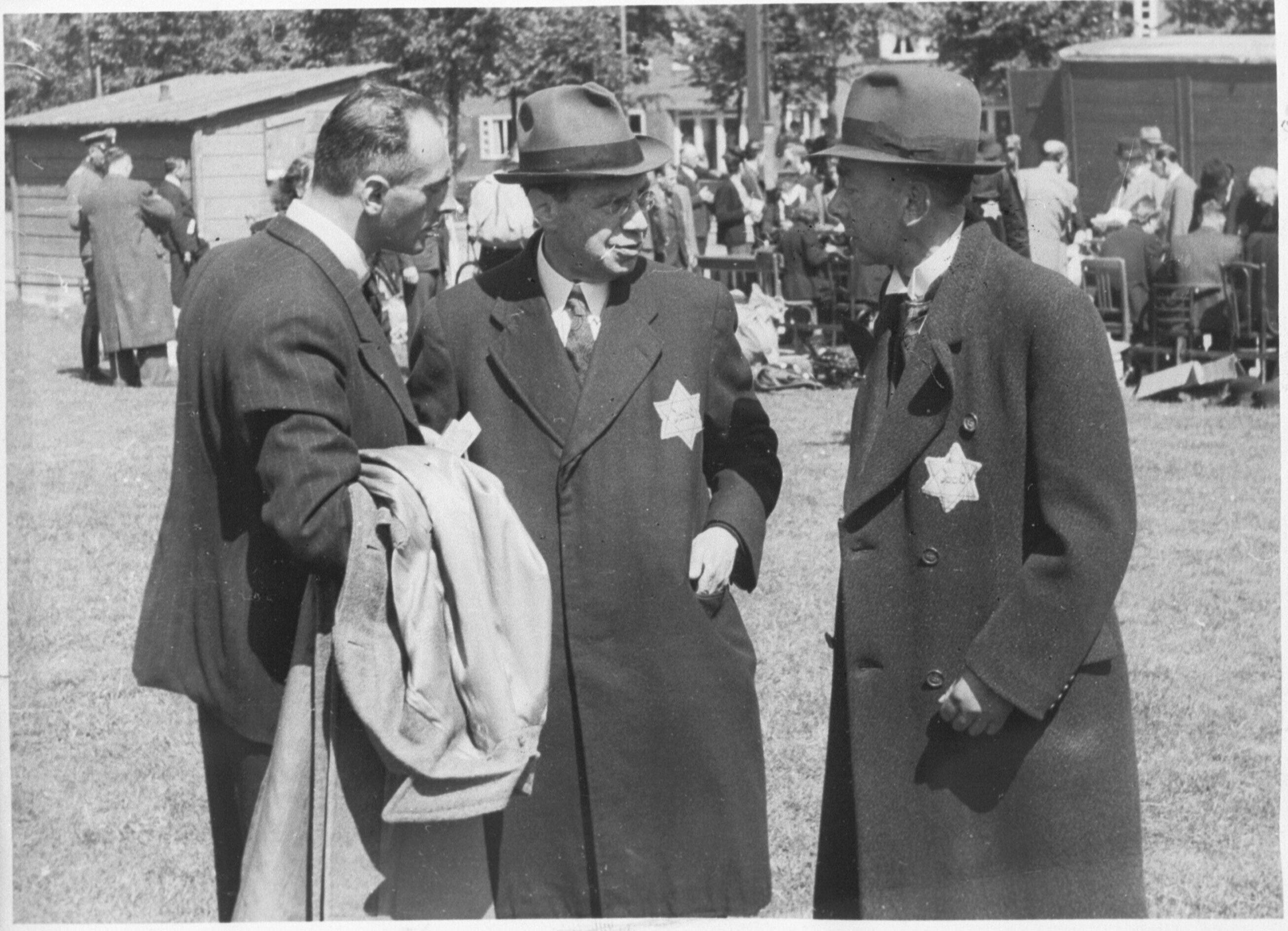
A photo from the raid of 20 June 1943, at the Olympiaplein plaza in Amsterdam

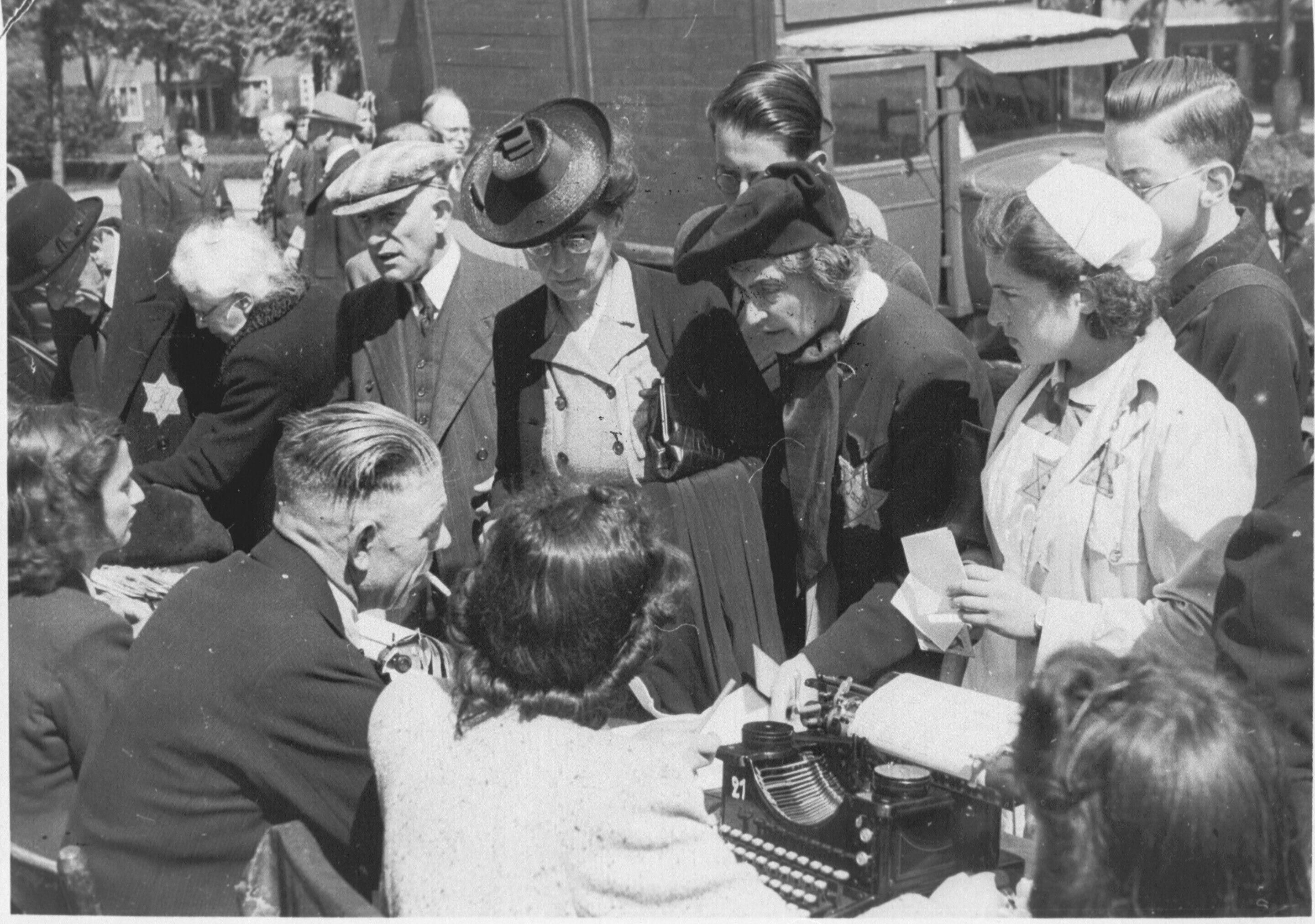
Heukel's photos of the raid generally did not show the police directly, but rather focused on the Jews

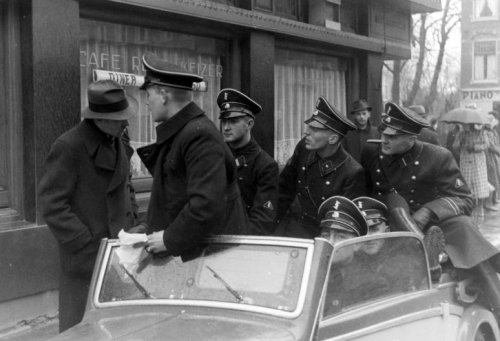
A picture of the Germaansche SS in Nederland

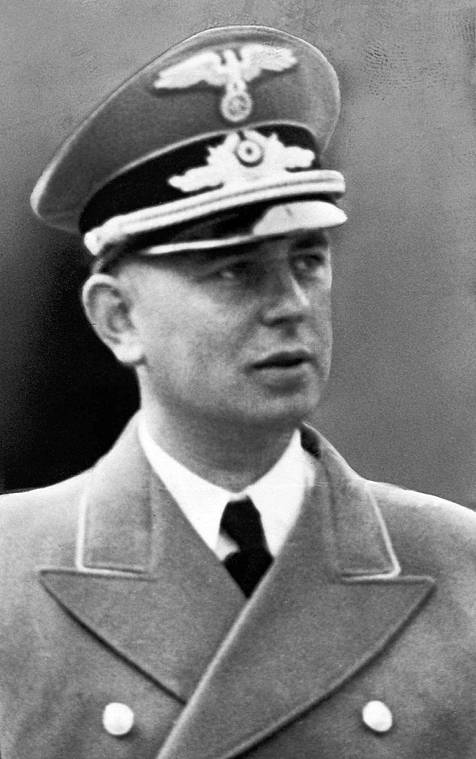
Werner Schröder, a government friend of Heukels who arranged him to take over seized Jewish photography businesses
