= South Tyrol Option Agreement =

1939 German-Italian agreement

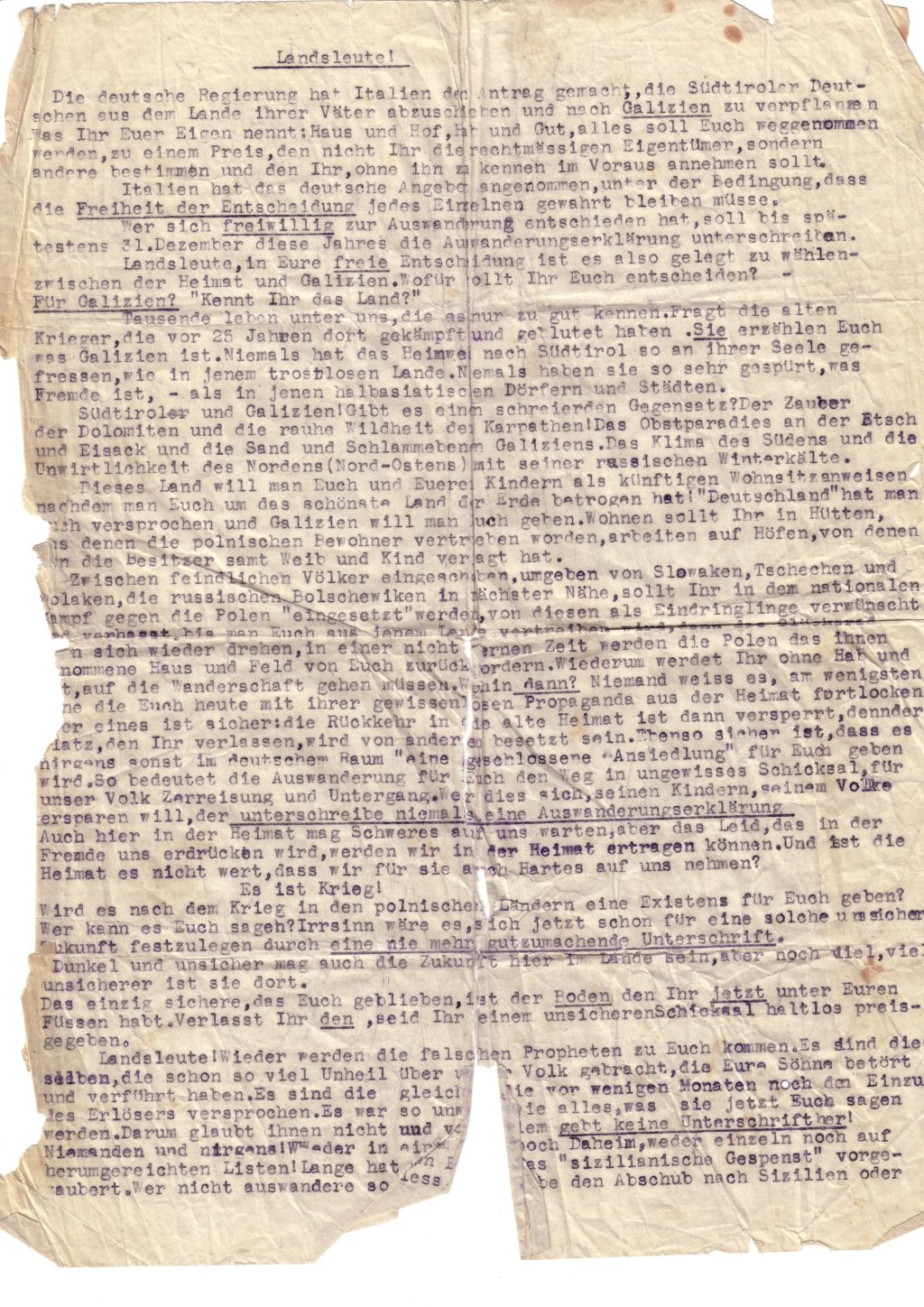
A flyer from the group of German-speakers who voted for staying in South Tyrol (Andreas Hofer Bund)

The South Tyrol Option Agreement (German: Option in Südtirol; Italian: Opzioni in Alto Adige) was an agreement in effect between 1939 and 1943, when the native German and Ladin-speaking people in South Tyrol and several other municipalities of northern Italy, which had belonged to the Austrian Empire until 1919, were given the right of option of either emigrating to neighboring Nazi Germany (of which Austria was a part after the 1938 Anschluss) or remaining in Fascist Italy, where the German minority was subjected to repressive Italianization efforts.

The upcoming decision led to tumultuous upheavals in the local society. A decisive role was played by the Völkischer Kampfring, a local Nazi group, with its successful propagandistic appeals to the German "nationality" and "ethnicity" of South Tyroleans, and its terror acts against dissenters.

Another key aspect was the spreading of fake rumors about an allegedly planned deportation of the "remainers" by the Italian government. Roughly 70%-85% opted to move to Germany. About one third of those actually migrated until 1943, when Nazi Germany invaded Italy following the overthrow of Mussolini.

== Background ==
The region of South Tyrol had been a place of contending claims and conflict between German nationalism and Italian nationalism. One of the leading founders of Italian nationalism, Giuseppe Mazzini, along with Ettore Tolomei, counterfactually claimed that the German-speaking South Tyrolian population were in fact mostly a Germanicized population of Roman origin who needed to be "liberated and returned to their rightful culture".

The southern part of Tyrol, renamed "Province of Bolzano", had been a part of Italy since the end of World War I. After the rise of fascism in 1922, a policy of Italianization in the area was implemented ruthlessly. All places, down to the tiniest hamlet, were given Italian names, and even family names were translated. The process intensified in the 1930s, when the government of Benito Mussolini encouraged thousands of southern Italians to relocate to the region, in a deliberate attempt at reducing the indigenous German-speaking population to a minority status.

Between 1928 and 1939, various resistance groups formed in the province to fight the fascist Italian regime and its policy of suppressing the German language. Children were taught the prohibited German language in clandestine catacombe schools and Catholic media and associations resisted the forced integration under the protection of the Vatican. The underground resistance movement, the Völkischer Kampfring Südtirols, was formed by a Nazi Party member, Peter Hofer.

The geopolitical situation changed radically following the incorporation of Austria into the German Reich in 1938. Mussolini, who could safely ignore grievances regarding his treatment of a German-speaking minority as long as his country's German-speaking neighbour was a weak Austria, now had a powerful regime with the explicit aim of incorporating all ethnic Germans into one Reich on his border.

Mussolini did not wish to annoy Adolf Hitler, but at the same time could not afford to be seen by his own people as anything less than an equal partner in relations with Germany. For his part, Hitler also placed sufficient value on maintaining friendly relations with Mussolini to avoid pursuing irredentist claims against Italy.

From the Nazi point of view, sacrificing South Tyrol was a relatively small price to pay in exchange for securing Italian support in pursuit of German claims elsewhere, starting with the Sudetenland before incorporating formerly German territories in Poland and ultimately vast territories in the east.

== Option for Germany ==
In June 1939, the Nazi regime in Germany and the fascist regime in Italy signed the Option Agreement.

On 21 October 1939, Hitler and Mussolini reached agreement on the assimilation of the ethnic German minorities in the province. The members of these two language communities had to choose by 31 December 1939 between remaining in Italy and losing all minority rights, or emigrating to Nazi Germany, the so-called "Option für Deutschland" (option for Germany).

Around 70% of the population opted for emigration; they were called Optanten and banded together in the Arbeitsgemeinschaft der Optanten für Deutschland (Association of Optants for Germany). Those who chose to stay, called Dableiber, mainly banded together around local Catholic priests.

The Völkischer Kampfring, a local Nazi organization, condemned the Dableiber as "traitors", comparing them to "Jews" or "Gypsies", and was responsible for aggressive propaganda, violence, and terror acts against them. The Option destroyed many families and the development of the economy of the province was set back for many years.

The Arbeitsgemeinschaft der Optanten für Deutschland (ADO; German for "Association of optants for Germany") was an association for German-speakers who had chosen to emigrate to Germany rather than stay in South Tyrol. The association was founded on 30 January 1940. Peter Hofer took leadership of the Association.

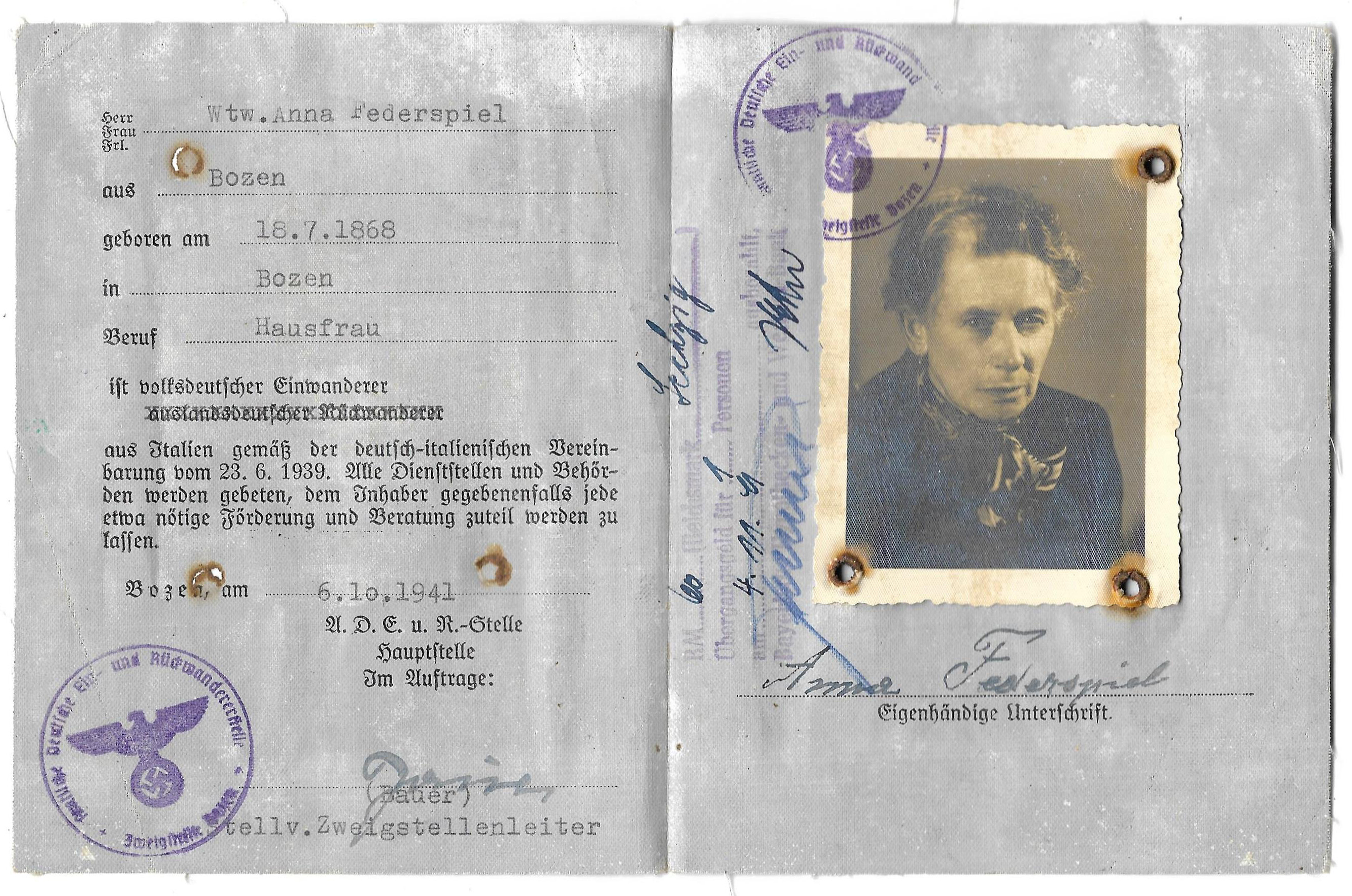
A 1939 German ID issued to a woman living in Italy following the South Tyrol Option Agreement

== German occupation ==
In September 1943, the Wehrmacht occupied the province and on 10 September 1943 the Operation Zone of the Alpine Foothills was established. The ADO was dissolved and merged with the Deutsche Volksgruppe. Peter Hofer was chosen as the Volksgruppenführer.

Some members of the ADO joined the South Tyrolean Volunteer Corps and were involved in the annihilation of the Jewish population in Merano,though the relocation of people and the complete Italianization of the area were never fully accomplished.

== Aftermath ==
Only a third of the people who had actually emigrated returned to the area in 1945. Despite Austrian efforts, South Tyrol remained part of Italy after World War II, and many chose to take up Italian citizenship after the Gruber–De Gasperi Agreement of September 1946.

It was named after the foreign minister of Austria (Karl Gruber) and the prime minister of Italy (Alcide De Gasperi) and agreed on Trentino-Alto Adige/Südtirol to remain part of Italy ensuring its autonomy. Those who returned had to register both themselves and their children, and they had to prove, by means of a birth certificate, that they had the right to Italian citizenship.

According to the 2001 census, 69.4% of the population of the province still had German as their first language, whereas 26.3% had Italian, and 4.3% Ladin.

== See also ==
- German as a minority language
- Heim ins Reich
- Italian irredentism
- Project Burgund

== Sources ==
- C. F. Latour (1965). "Germany, Italy and South Tyrol, 1938–45", The Historical Journal, Vol. 8, No. 1, pp. 95–111.
- Klaus Eisterer, Rolf Steininger (ed.). "Die Option. Südtirol zwischen Faschismus und Nationalsozialismus", Innsbrucker Forschungen zur Zeitgeschichte, Vol. 5 (1989), Haymon Verlag, Innsbruck.
- Stefan Lechner (2012). "Die Erste Option: die Vergabe der italienischen Staatsbürgerschaft an die Südtiroler in Folge der Annexion 1920." In Hannes Obermair, Stephanie Risse, Carlo Romeo (eds.). Regionale Zivilgesellschaft in Bewegung. Festschrift für Hans Heiss (= Cittadini innanzi tutto). Folio Verlag, Vienna-Bozen 2012. ISBN 978-3-85256-618-4, pp. 219–36.
- Reinhold Messner (ed.). Die Option. 1939 stimmten 86% der Südtiroler für das Aufgeben ihrer Heimat. Warum?, Serie Piper, Munich, 1995. ISBN 3-492-12133-0
- Hannes Obermair (2021). "Großdeutschland ruft!" Südtiroler NS-Optionspropaganda und völkische Sozialisation – "La Grande Germania chiamaǃ" La propaganda nazionalsocialista sulle Opzioni in Alto Adige e la socializzazione 'völkisch' (in German and Italian). Tyrol Castle: South Tyrolean Museum of History. ISBN 978-88-95523-36-1.
- Hannes Obermair (2021). The South Tyrolean Option—a Brief Overview. In Anja Manfredi, The South Tyrolean Housing Estate, or the Memory of the Houses, the Plants, and the Birds. Vienna, Schlebrügge Editor, 2021, ISBN 978-3-903172-74-6, pp. 123–7.
- Rolf Steininger (1997). "23. Juni 1939 – Gehen oder bleiben? Die Option in Südtirol", Österreich im 20. Jahrhundert, Vol. 2, Böhlau, Vienna, pp. 217–57.
