= Project Burgund =

Abortive Nazi project

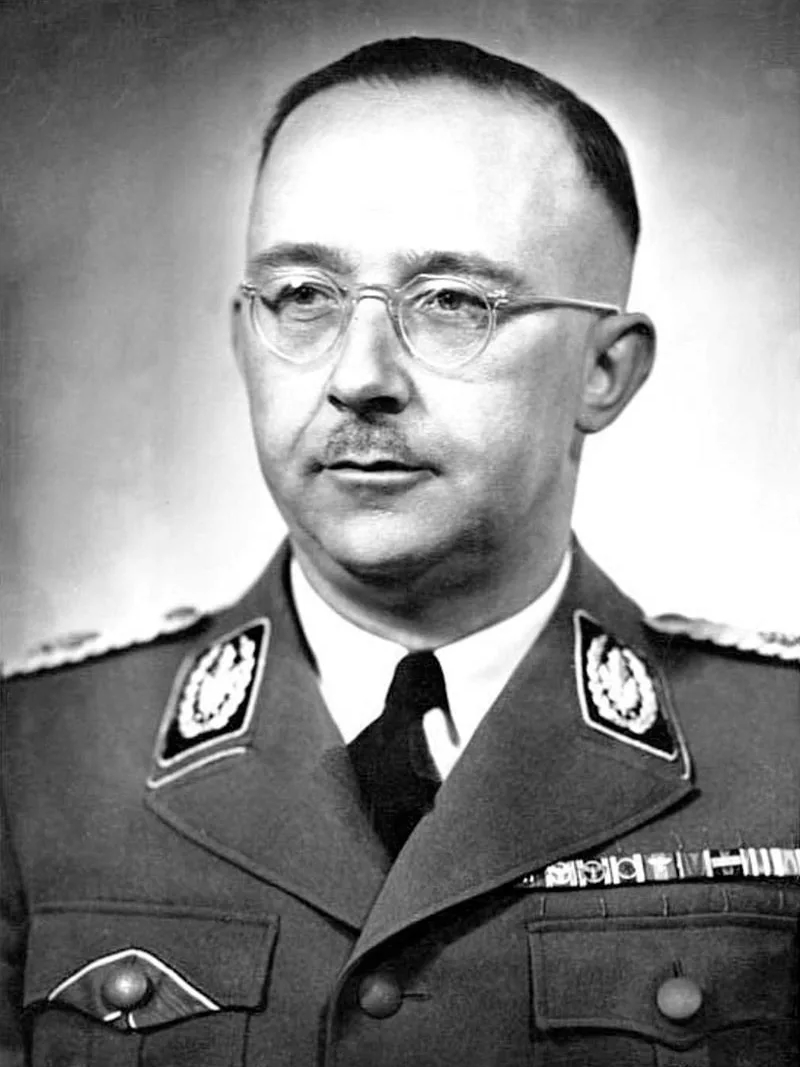
Himmler in 1942

Project Burgund refers to the plans developed in the early 1940s by Reichsführer-SS Heinrich Himmler to hive off part of the territory of occupied France and establish an SS-run polity that would revive the inheritance of the Germanic Burgundians. The project, inspired by the ideology of the SS, was never implemented.

== Name ==
French historian and politician Joseph Pinard has referred to Himmler's plan as Project Burgund. Other historians have referred to it as Reichsgebiet Burgund, Reichsgau Burgund, or SS-Staat Burgund.

== History ==
In the wake of 19th-century German irredentism and romantic nationalism, Himmler aspired to reverse all past French encroachments on the Holy Roman Empire, or First Reich. One of these had been Franche-Comté, part of the Empire until its final conquest by France in 1673-1674 during the Franco-Dutch War. Moreover, as recalled by its older name of Free County of Burgundy (German: Freigrafschaft Burgund), Franche-Comté was historically and mythically related with the Germanic Burgundian people, who migrated there following the demise of their kingdom of Worms as narrated by the medieval Nibelungenlied. Those resonances likely appealed to Himmler given his obsession with Germanic mythology.

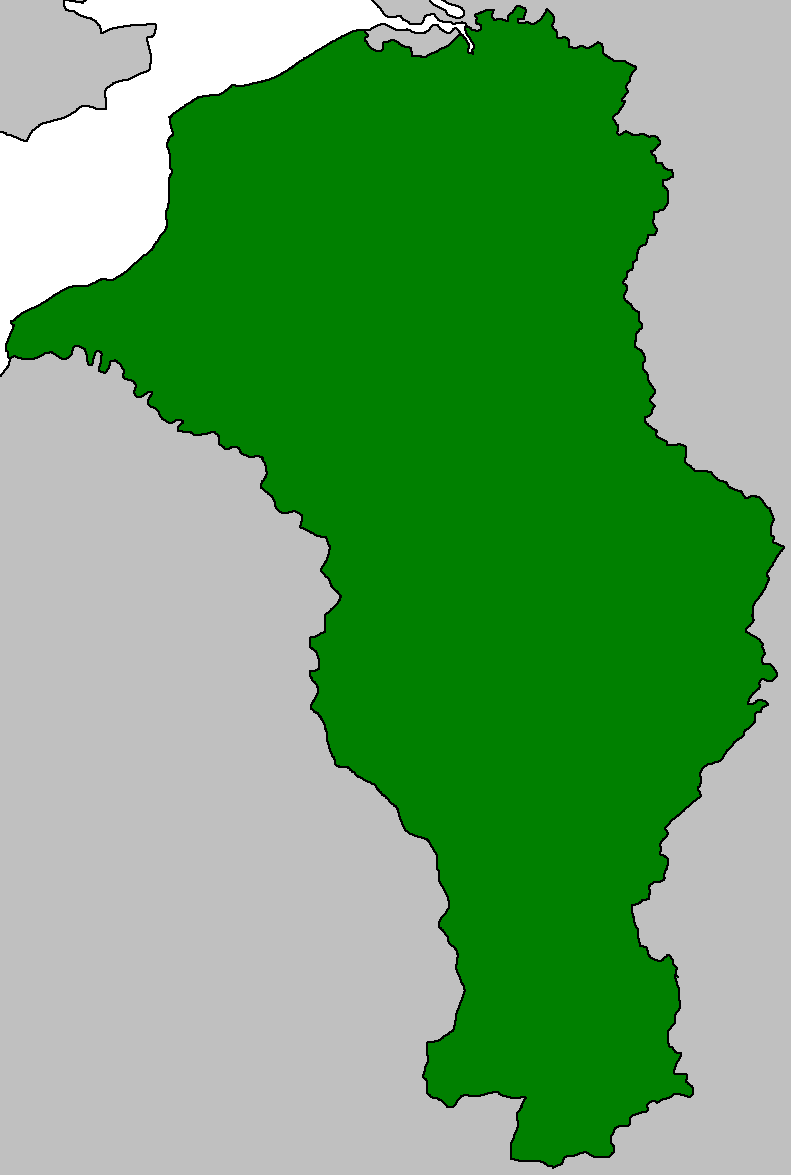
Visualization of Ordenstaat Burgund

Simultaneously, as Reich Commissioner for the Consolidation of German Nationhood, Himmler had to address the issue of ethnic Germans who were expected to leave Italian-ruled South Tyrol under the 1939 South Tyrol Option Agreement. He thus formed the plan to relocate around 150,000 South Tyroleans into Franche-Comté, which was alleged to have a similar landscape and had been partly depopulated by mass exodus during the 1940 Battle of France. In mid-July 1940, Himmler visited Franche-Comté to help promote the project and also to intimidate Switzerland, which he was in favor of invading. The plan included the renaming of local cities and towns with names of South Tyrolean localities that had been forcibly italianized by Fascist Italy, including Besançon as Bozen (Bolzano) and Dole as Brixen (Bressanone). It was actively developed under Himmler's authority and with involvement of South Tyrolean activist Peter Hofer, but that phase ended in late 1940, possibly because of Adolf Hitler's wariness of further humiliation that might destabilize Vichy France and/or lack of widespread acceptance among South Tyroleans. By 1942, Hitler had decided that the South Tyroleans would be used to settle Crimea instead of Eastern France. Himmler commented with regret: "For Burgundy, we will just have to find another [Germanic] ethnic group."

Beyond Franche-Comté, Himmler at times envisioned "Burgund" as an ahistorical combination of territories held at different times by the early medieval Kingdom of Burgundy and late medieval Burgundian State, plus some that had never been under any "Burgundian" rule. His personal physical therapist Felix Kersten recorded him as enthusing in 1943: "The borders would encompass the former Burgundian lands: in the north, Artois, Hainaut, and Luxembourg, French Lorraine, Franche-Comté, and in the south, Dauphiné and Provence. Added to this would be Picardy with Amiens, and Champagne with Reims and Troyes. Reims or Dijon were planned as the capital... The rest of France was to be called 'Gaul'."

While primarily associated with Himmler, the project was shared by other Nazi officials. On 26 April 1942, Joseph Goebbels noted in his diary: "However the war ends, France will have to pay dearly, for she caused and started it. She is now being thrown back to her borders of AD 1500. This means that Burgundy will again become part of the Reich. We shall thereby win a province that so far as beauty and wealth are concerned compares more than favorably with any other German province."

== See also ==
- Breton nationalism and World War II
- New Order (Nazism)
