= Westland (Nazi propaganda) =

Proposed territory of Nazi Germany

Westland is the name with which the government of Nazi Germany intended to replace that of the Netherlands (Dutch: Nederland; German: Niederlande) during its 1940–45 occupation of the country. The name refers to the fact that the Netherlands lies directly to the west of Germany, hence "the land of the West". Compare Ostmark, the name adopted for Austria after the Anschluss by the Nazi movement.

Nazi race theory stressed the supposed "Aryan" status of the Dutch people (and thus their racial kinship with the Germans themselves), as a result of which the occupying Nazi authorities desired to annex the Netherlands into a greatly enlarged version of the (already-expanded) German Reich, the Greater Germanic Reich. Early political plans proposed transforming the country in its entirety into a Gau Westland, or even a Gau Holland. More detailed plans suggested its outright dissection into five different Gaue, all of which remained unnamed:

- Friesland, Groningen, and Drenthe, capital: Groningen;
- Gelderland and Overijssel, capital: Arnhem;
- North Holland and Utrecht, capital: Amsterdam;
- South Holland and Zeeland, capital: The Hague;
- North Brabant and Limburg, capital: Eindhoven.

During this period the name was also adopted by the Nazis for, amongst others:

- One of the main Waffen-SS units composed primarily of Dutch volunteers, the Standarte Westland.
- Uitgeverij Westland, a "folkish" (Dutch: Volksche) new book publisher established by the occupation government which was responsible for disseminating Nazi, fascist, and pro-German propaganda.
- A political-scientific periodical journal edited by Arthur Seyss-Inquart, the senior administrator of the civilian occupation regime in the Netherlands.

In a wider political context the term was also prominently used by a number of Nazi scholars in the above-mentioned Westland journal to describe the entire frontier area between Central Europe (the "Germanic world") and Western Europe (France and Great Britain), which they referred to as the Westland. This region was considered to be bounded by the watersheds of the Meuse and the Seine rivers in the west and that of the Rhine in the east. They held that throughout the previous ages of history the French had tried to "hammer away at this territory in a futile Drang nach Osten" by trying to extend its dominion all the way to the Rhine river, but failed in its attempt due to the territory's "natural and racial connection to the Germanic realm". It was further purported that England subsequently tried to exploit Franco-German hostility by turning the area into "an instrument in its balance of power politics". It was thus deemed that one of Nazi Germany's main purposes in the present conflict would be to "restore the Westland for all time to its position dictated by natural law as the Westmark of the Germanic center of Europe", and to "once again take up its watch" at the mouths of the Rhine, the Meuse, and the Scheldt rivers.

== See also ==
- Ostmark (Austria)
- Reichskommissariat Niederlande
- Greater Germanic Reich
- Netherlands in World War II
