= Gustav Adolf Scheel =

German physician and Nazi Party official (1907–1979)

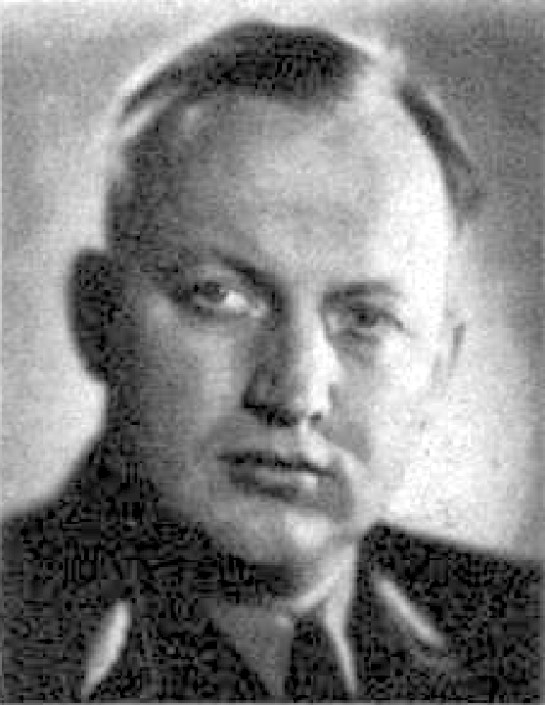

Reich Minister of Science, Education and Culture
- In office 30 April 1945 – 3 May 1945
- Preceded by: Bernhard Rust
- Succeeded by: Wilhelm Stuckart

Reichsstatthalter of Salzburg
- In office 27 November 1941 – 8 May 1945
- Preceded by: Friedrich Rainer
- Succeeded by: Position abolished

Gauleiter of Salzburg
- In office 18 November 1941 – 8 May 1945
- Preceded by: Friedrich Rainer
- Succeeded by: Position abolished

Higher SS and Police Leader, Alpenland
- In office 1 May 1941 – 24 November 1941
- Preceded by: Alfred Rodenbücher
- Succeeded by: Erwin Rösener

Reich Student Leader
- In office 6 November 1936 – 8 May 1945
- Preceded by: Position created
- Succeeded by: Position abolished

Personal details
- Born: 21 November 1907 Rosenberg, Grand Duchy of Baden, German Empire
- Died: 25 March 1979 (aged 71) Hamburg, West Germany
- Party: Nazi Party
- Education: Heidelberg University
- Profession: Physician
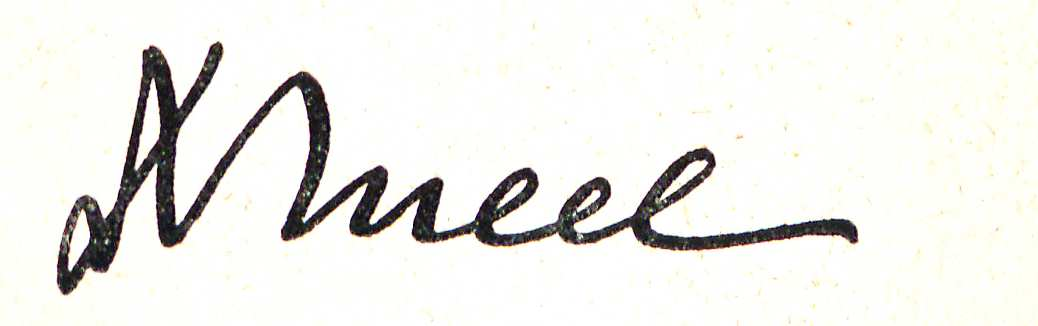
- Signature

Military service
- Allegiance: Nazi Germany
- Branch/service: Luftwaffe
- Years of service: 1940
- Rank: Unterarzt
- Battles/wars: World War II; Battle of France
- Awards: War Merit Cross with swords, 1st and 2nd class

Gustav Adolf Scheel (22 November 1907 – 25 March 1979) was a German physician and Nazi Party official. He served as a "multifunctionary" in Nazi Germany, including posts as the Reich Student Leader leading both the National Socialist German Students' League and the German Student Union, as an SS member and Sicherheitsdienst employee, as a Higher SS and Police Leader, as well as Gauleiter and Reichsstatthalter in Reichsgau Salzburg. He was also an Einsatzgruppe commander in occupied Alsace and he organized the October 1940 deportation of Karlsruhe's Jews to extermination camps.

== Early years ==
Born as a Protestant pastor's son in Rosenberg, North Baden, Scheel attended classical gymnasium schools in Freiburg, Tauberbischofsheim and Mannheim. While still a schoolboy, he became involved in nationalist circles of the German Youth Movement and Nazi groups.

Beginning in the summer semester of 1928, he studied law, political economy and theology at Heidelberg University to become a minister like his father. Scheel intensified his activities in right-wing student circles and in the winter semester of 1928-29 became a member of the Verein Deutscher Studenten (VDSt), an umbrella organization of German Studentenverbindung fraternities. In 1928 he also joined the Heidelberg German Student Union (Deutschen Studentenschaft, DStA). In October 1931 he was named to the board of directors and in December 1931 he became its chairman.

== Nazi career ==
=== Student and academic posts ===
In 1930 he joined the National Socialist German Students' League (NSDStB), on 1 October 1930 the Sturmabteilung (SA) and on 1 December 1930 the Nazi Party (NSDAP). He moved for a short time to Tübingen University to begin studies in medicine. He continued his studies again in Heidelberg, where he quickly rose to become one of the main propagandists of the Nazis at the college. As NSDStB College Group Leader (Hochschulgruppenführer), he led the Nazi student rallies against the mathematics professor and pacifist Emil Julius Gumbel (1891–1966) which led to the removal of Gumbel's teaching entitlement in 1932.

In 1933, Scheel became chairman of the Heidelberg General Students' Committee (AStA) and fought vehemently for the exclusion of students of Jewish lineage from the benefits of social institutions at the university. During this time, he also became Hanns-Martin Schleyer's mentor, getting him to join the NSDAP and the SS. Furthermore, Scheel exerted influence over the university's appointments and personnel policy in his capacity as student body leader and member of the vice chancellor's leadership staff.

On 10 May 1933, Scheel was one of the main speakers at the Heidelberg book burning. In April 1934, he passed his State medical examination and received his doctorate in medicine on 31 May 1935. In November 1935, on his 28th birthday, Scheel was named as an honorary Senator of Heidelberg University. On 6 November 1936, he acceded to the newly created post of Reichsstudentenführer (Reich Student Leader) a position he would retain until the fall of the Nazi regime. As such, he headed both the NSDStB and the DstA. With this came the rank of Amtsleiter in the Party Reichsleitung (National Leadership). Scheel would advance to Hauptamstleiter in April 1937 and Hauptdienstleiter in April 1940.

In April 1938, Scheel became an active Senator of Heidelberg University, and he was also elected to the Reichstag from electoral constituency 20, Cologne-Aachen, retaining this seat until May 1945. In May 1938, he became leader of the National Socialist Alumni Association and also served as editor of its official organ, Der Altherrenbund. That same month he was made Chairman of the Reichsstudentenwerk (Reich Student Union). In November 1940, he was named an honorary Senator of Julius Maximilian University of Würzburg.

In 1943, he declared in his capacity as Reich Student Leader that the members of the White Rose (Weiße Rose) resistance group should be "executed not as students," but rather as "antisocial former Wehrmacht members." Scheel's point of view was that these "criminals" should not be allowed to stain the student body's image. From this time also came Scheel's declaration: "German student, it is not necessary for you to live, but, to be sure, to fulfill your duty to your people." In 1943, Scheel became President of the German Academic Exchange Service and in June 1944, he succeeded Walter Schultze as leader of the National Socialist German Lecturers League.

=== SS and Security Service (SD) ===
On 30 July 1934 Scheel was accepted into the Sicherheitsdienst (SD), the Nazi Party security service by its head, Reinhard Heydrich. He left the SA and joined the Schutzstaffel (SS) on 15 September 1934 and became a full time SD employee in the SD Main Office. He rose swiftly in this secret Nazi intelligence service. Between September 1934 and August 1935 he headed the SD training school in Berlin. Between August 1935 and September 1939 he was Leader of the SD Oberabschnitt (Upper District) Southwest, headquartered in Stuttgart.

As a former student official, he brought along with him to the SD many young Nazi academics who went on to become mass murderers. Among them were Walter Stahlecker, Martin Sandberger, Erwin Weinmann, Albert Rapp, Erich Ehrlinger, and Eugen Steimle, all of whom went into various divisions of the Reichssicherheitshauptamt (RSHA) to become leaders of murder squads of the various Einsatzgruppen.

Promoted to SS-Oberführer, Scheel on 25 April 1938 became Inspector for the Sicherheitspolizei (Security Police, SiPo) and Sicherheitsdienst (Security Service, SD) in Wehrkreis (Military District) V (Baden and Württemberg), based in Stuttgart. He then transferred to become Leader of SD Oberabschnitt South in Munich from 18 June 1939. On 6 December 1939, he became the Inspector for SiPo and SD in Wehrkreis VII (Munich) and XIII (Nuremberg) encompassing all of Bavaria.

Scheel, in the spring of 1940 performed military service as a medical officer with the rank of Unterarzt, serving with the Luftwaffe in the battle of France. After the fall of France, from May through July 1940, Scheel headed Einsatzgruppe III in Alsace and was involved in the deportation of Jews from that area. From August 1940 to January 1941 he was Befehlshaber der Sicherheitspolizei und des SD (Commander of the SiPo and SD) attached to the office of the Chief of Civil Administration in Alsace, Robert Heinrich Wagner. In October 1940, Scheel organised the deportation of Karlsruhe's Jews to their certain deaths in the east.

Scheel's further rise within the Nazi repression apparatus continued unabated. In April 1941, he rose to the rank of SS-Brigadeführer. He became the Higher SS and Police Leader (HSSP) Alpenland from 1 May 1941 while also commanding SS Oberabschnitt Alpenland. In this post, he was the commander of all SS and police forces, including the Ordnungspolizei (Order Police) in the four Reichsgaue of Wehrkreis XVIII, Carinthia, Salzburg, Styria and Tirol-Vorarlberg and reported directly to Heinrich Himmler. He was made a Major General of Police on 19 October 1941. Scheel left the SD service on 24 November 1941 and was transferred to the staff of the Reichsführer-SS. He was promoted to SS-Gruppenführer on 21 June 1942, SS-Obergruppenführer on 1 August 1944 and General of Police on 4 August 1944.

=== Gauleiter and Reichsstatthalter ===
Scheel was named as Gauleiter of Reichsgau Salzburg on 18 November 1941, succeeding Friedrich Rainer. Formally installed on 27 November, he also that day succeeded Rainer as Reichsstatthalter (Reich Governor) thus uniting under his control the highest party and governmental offices in his jurisdiction. Further, on 11 December he also succeeded Rainer as Reich Defense Commissioner of Wehrkreis XVIII. This entailed responsibility for civil defense and evacuation measures as well as administration of wartime rationing and suppression of black market activity. On 16 November 1942, the jurisdiction of the Reich Defense Commissioners was changed from the Wehrkreis to the Gau level, and Scheel remained Commissioner for his Reichsgau alone. After the discovery of resistance groups in Salzburg, Scheel organized a widespread wave of arrests and had a number of railwaymen put to death.

In September 1944 Scheel, as the Reich Defense Commissioner, was made leader of the Volkssturm in Reichsgau Salzburg. On 29 April 1945, Adolf Hitler, in his political testament, named Scheel Reich Minister of Culture, in the short-lived Goebbels cabinet.

As a Nazi "multifunctionary", Scheel held the following functions (in addition to those mentioned above):

- Member of the Reich Labour Chamber
- Member of the Executive Board of the Reichsforschungsrat (Reich Research Council)
- Leader of the Trainee Office in the Reichsforschungrat

== Postwar life ==
After Salzburg's peaceful surrender to the Americans on 4 May, Scheel fled with his family to Sankt Veit an der Glan and on 14 May was arrested by the US 307th Counterintelligence Corps and interned. After spending time in many camps and prisons, he was released on 24 December 1947. After once again being interned, he was transferred to Heidelberg to undergo denazification. A local court sentenced him in December 1948 to five years in a labour camp, and classified him as Category I, Hauptschuldiger (literally "main culprit"). He was however released on 24 December 1948 as a result of several testimonies in his defence stating that he had ignored Hitler's commands to defend the city of Salzburg against the approaching US forces.

Afterwards, he first worked as a night worker at the Port of Hamburg, and as of summer 1949, he was a doctor in a Hamburg hospital, then an assistant doctor at Rautenberg Hospital in Hamburg. After an appeal proceeding in 1952, Scheel was reclassified to Category II as a Belasteter ("incriminated one"). From 1951 to 1953, he belonged, along with other former Nazi leaders such as Werner Naumann, Karl Kaufmann and Werner Best, to the neo-Nazi Naumann Circle that tried to infiltrate the Free Democratic Party, and so was arrested in January 1953 by British police. He was handed over to German authorities in Karlsruhe in March and released by them on 17 June 1953. On 3 December 1954, his trial was dismissed for lack of adequate evidence of wrongdoing. From February 1954 to 8 April 1977, he was the owner of a medical practice in Hamburg.

== Sources ==
- Miller, Michael D.; Schulz, Andreus (2021). Gauleiter: The Regional Leaders of the Nazi Party and Their Deputies, 1925 – 1945. Vol. 3. Fonthill Media. ISBN 978-1-781-55826-3.
- Williams, Max (2017). SS Elite: The Senior Leaders of Hitler's Praetorian Guard. Vol. 3. Fonthill Media LLC. ISBN 978-1-78155-638-2.
