= Frederick Mayer (spy) =

American spy in Germany in WWII (1921–2016)

Frederick Mayer (28 October 1921, Freiburg im Breisgau, Baden, Germany – 15 April 2016, Charles Town, Jefferson County, West Virginia) was a German-born Jew who became an American spy as an OSS agent for the United States during World War II. He negotiated the surrender of the German Army in Innsbruck, Austria, in 1945 after he was captured serving in "Operation Greenup."

== Background ==
Frederick Mayer was born in Freiburg im Breisgau, into a Jewish family. He was the son of Berthilda (Dreyfuss) and Heinrich Mayer. His father had served in the Imperial German Army during World War I, and was decorated with the Iron Cross Second Class for gallantry during the Battle of Verdun.

After finishing high school, Frederick Mayer worked as a diesel mechanic with the Ford Motor Company. He lived by a practical motto: "Do your best at everything every day, control what you can, and what you can't, don't worry about".

After the Nazis came to power in 1933, Antisemitism became an official policy of the German government. Mayer's father hoped his distinguished military record would protect his family, but his wife insisted that the family leave Germany while they still could. They emigrated to the United States in 1938, one year before World War II broke out in Europe. Frederick Mayer worked at twenty different jobs during his time in New York City. When one of his bosses made an anti-Semitic remark, Mayer knocked him down and resigned on the spot, just as he had previously done in Germany.

In December 1941, following the Japanese attack on Pearl Harbor Mayer enlisted in the United States Army. During a training exercise in Arizona, he crossed the "enemy" line and "captured" several officers, including a brigadier general. The general said, "You can't do that! You are breaking the rules!" Mayer replied, "War is not fair. The rules of war are to win." The general then raised his hands in the air, admitting defeat.

Mayer was trained in demolition, infiltration, raiding, sniping, and hand-to-hand combat. His knowledge of several European languages (German, French, Spanish) made him a good candidate for the Office of Strategic Services (OSS), a wartime precursor to Department of State's Bureau of Intelligence and Research (INR) and CIA. Mayer's group of 30 men included four other European Jewish refugees: George Gerbner (Hungary), Alfred Rosenthal (Germany), Bernd Steinitz (Germany) and Hans Wijnberg (Netherlands). Each of them spoke at least two European languages, were familiar with the European environment, and were eager to do what they could to defeat the Nazis.

Eventually, all five would then serve in Austria in various OSS operations. Mayer became commander of Operation Greenup, with Wijnberg serving as his radio operator.

== Hans Wijnberg ==
Hans Wijnberg was born on November 28, 1922, in Amsterdam, the Netherlands. In 1939 Hans's father sent Wijnberg and his twin brother (Louis*) to the United States. The boys stayed with their father's business partner and continued their education in Brooklyn Technical High School. In 1943 Hans and Louis Wijnberg joined the United States Army. At about the same time their father (Leonard), mother (Henriëtte) and younger brother (Robert), who stayed in the Netherlands were captured by the SS, and sent to the Auschwitz concentration camp. One day Hans Wijnberg was approached by an officer, who said: "We understand you speak German, Dutch and English. Would you like to help your country?" Without hesitation Hans responded: "Sure".

== Operation Greenup ==
Former Director of the Central Intelligence Agency William J. Casey called Operation Greenup "by far the most successful of OSS operations mounted from Bari". The operation included three men: Mayer, Wijnberg, and Franz Weber, a former Austrian Wehrmacht officer. Their task was to scout "the heavily fortified area of Austria's 'Alpine Redoubt'".

It was decided the men should be parachuted near Innsbruck, but all flat areas were occupied by the military. Mayer recalled a small lake between two peaks that was frozen in February. It wasn't an easy place to fly to, especially in the winter conditions, but finally a pilot named John Billings volunteered. "If they are crazy enough to jump there, I will be crazy enough to take them there." On February 26, 1945, the men jumped in the darkness. They found themselves at the ridge of a glacier at a 10,000 feet elevation. They found all but one container that was dropped with them. Unfortunately their skis were in that missing container. They had to walk down the slope in waist-deep snow.

Eventually they reached Weber's family. With their help, Mayer posed as a German Army officer. He actually stayed in the officers' barracks in Innsbruck for several months. The information he collected was promptly radioed back by Wijnberg. After three months Mayer decided to pose as a French electrician, who supposedly was fleeing from the advancing Soviet forces.

== Arrest and torture ==
Mayer was arrested when a black market racketeer he dealt with was caught by the Gestapo and named him as a spy. As soon as his interrogation became physical, the black marketer revealed that he knew a high ranking American agent. Mayer spoke only in French, and tried to convince the Gestapo that he was what he pretended to be. He was tortured to force him to talk:

In the dark room, the Gestapo officers slapped and punched the spy in the face. His cover wasn't holding water, and so the tall one stripped him from head to toe. Despite the agent's bullish strength, the SS men brutally manhandled him, shoving him to the floor. Cuffing his hands in front of him and pulling his arms over his bent knees, they forced him into a constricting fetal position, then shoved the barrel of a long rifle into the tiny gap behind his knees and his cuffed hands. With a man on each side of the rifle, they lifted his naked, rolled-up body and suspended the human ball between two tables, like a piece of meat on a skewer. Uncoiling a rawhide whip, the tall one put his full weight behind each swing, mercilessly thrashing the agent's body like a side of beef.

All that time the Gestapo kept asking where his radio and radio operator were. One Nazi noticed that Mayer was circumcised, but the other dismissed it. They refused to believe that a Jew would return as an agent for the Allies.

Then the man who betrayed him was brought to face Mayer. Realizing that there was no more use pretending, Mayer began speaking German. He confirmed he was an American. However, he insisted that he worked alone.

== Austrian surrender ==
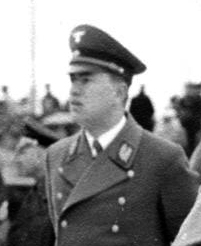
Franz Hofer

At the same time Mayer was tortured, Hermann Matull, another American agent, was being interrogated by the Gestapo. He was shown the picture of Mayer's beaten and swollen face, and was asked if he knew the man. Matull recognized him instantly. He claimed that Mayer was a "big shot" in the American command, and that if Mayer were shot, the Americans would kill all who had mistreated him. Matull even insisted that a man as senior as Mayer could be interrogated only by the Gauleiter of Tyrol and Vorarlberg, Franz Hofer.

Hofer believed that the defeat of Germany was inevitable, and was looking for a way to surrender to the Americans rather than to the Red Army. He ordered the Gestapo to bring Mayer to him. Mayer was introduced to Hofer's wife and the German ambassador to Benito Mussolini's government, Rudolph Rahn. They ate dinner and talked. Mayer initially believed that it was just a new way to make him reveal where his radio operator Hans Wijnberg was located, but he later understood that the Germans were really there to discuss their surrender. Rahn said he was going to Bern, and promised to deliver Mayer's message to Allen Welsh Dulles, the OSS man there. Mayer agreed. It was the only way to inform the center of what was going on without revealing the existence of Wijnberg. Dulles got the message and cabled it to OSS headquarters in Italy: "Fred Mayer reports he is in Gestapo hands but cabled 'Don't worry about me, I'm really not bad off'" – a remarkable message considering that it was coming from a Jew.

On the morning of May 3, 1945, the American 103rd Infantry Division of the Seventh Army was ordered to take Innsbruck. When the troops got closer to the city, they saw an approaching car with a white banner made out of a bed sheet. Major Bland West, an intelligence officer, saw a young man with a swollen face jumping out of the car. He introduced himself as Lt. Mayer of the OSS, and explained that he was going to take the major with him to accept the German surrender. Later on West found out that Mayer was a sergeant. Thus, the German troops in this area surrendered to an American sergeant, a Jewish emigrant from Germany.

== Awards ==
Fred Mayer was awarded these medals and badges:

- Legion of Merit
- Purple Heart
- Good Conduct Medal
- Prisoner of War Medal
- American Campaign Medal
- European-African-Middle Eastern Campaign Medal with three Bronze Services Star
- Army of Occupation Medal
- World War II Victory Medal
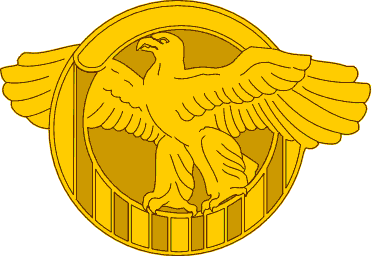
- Honorable Service Lapel Button
- Parachutist Badge

== Later years ==
A TV movie based on Operation Greenup, with Frederick Mayer and the other surviving agents and family members, titled The Real Inglorious Bastards (2012), premiered on History Television. In it, Wijnberg and Mayer are reconnected for a discussion via webcam chat. Hans Wijnberg died the day after his interview for the production. The movie specifies that Mayer, Weber, and Wijnberg "were all decorated for their role in Operation Greenup".

Director Ernst Gossner acquired the life rights from Frederick Mayer and is currently working on a TV Mini-Series as well as a movie on Operation Greenup.

In April 2013, Senator Jay Rockefeller from West Virginia wrote a letter to President Obama asking him to consider further recognizing Mayer's service to the United States. Rockefeller later presented a signed letter from Obama to Mayer thanking him for his service. On March 18, 2014, West Virginia Secretary of State Natalie Tennant called on President Obama to award Fred Mayer the Medal of Honor. Secretary Tennant also posted a 20-minute interview with him and presented him a special Certificate of Commendation from her office.

Mayer lived in Charles Town, West Virginia, from 1977. He was a Meals on Wheels volunteer. Mayer died on April 15, 2016.

== Bibliography ==
- Lichtblau, Eric (2019). Return to the Reich. Description & searchable preview. Houghton Mifflin Harcourt. ISBN 9781328528537
- Mayer, Fred (2010). Moment of Truth.
- Moon, Tom (2000). This Grim and Savage Game: OSS and the Beginning of U.S. covert Operations. Da Capo Press. p. 270. ISBN 978-0-306-80956-9. "mayer."
- O'Donnell, Patrick K. (2009). They Dared Return: The True Story of Jewish Spies Behind the Lines in Nazi Germany. Da Capo Press. ISBN 978-0-306-81800-4.
- Schwab, Gerald (1996). OSS Agents in Hitler's Heartland: Destination Innsbruck. Praeger Publishers. p. 5. ISBN 978-0-275-95470-3.
