= Friedrich Rainer =

Austrian Nazi politician, Gauleiter and SS-Obergruppenführer (1903–1950)

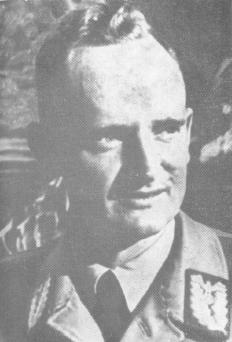
- Rainer in 1944

Reichsstatthalter of Salzburg
- In office 15 March 1940 – 27 November 1941
- Preceded by: Anton Wintersteiger
- Succeeded by: Gustav Adolf Scheel

Gauleiter of Reichsgau Salzburg
- In office 22 May 1938 – 27 November 1941
- Preceded by: Anton Wintersteiger
- Succeeded by: Gustav Adolf Scheel

Reichsstatthalter of Carinthia
- In office 27 November 1941 – 7 May 1945
- Preceded by: Wladimir von Pawlowski
- Succeeded by: Position abolished

Gauleiter of Reichsgau Carinthia
- In office 27 November 1941 – 7 May 1945
- Preceded by: Franz Kutschera
- Succeeded by: Position abolished

Personal details
- Born: 28 July 1903 Sankt Veit an der Glan, Carinthia, Austria-Hungary
- Died: November 1950 (aged 47) Ljubljana, Yugoslavia
- Party: Nazi Party
- Profession: Notary

Friedrich W. Rainer (28 July 1903 – November 1950) was an Austrian Nazi Party politician, Gauleiter as well as a Reichsstatthalter of Salzburg and Carinthia. He is the only Austrian governor who has ever held the same office in two separate states. He was tried in a military trial in Ljubljana, Yugoslavia in 1947 and found guilty of crimes against the people and sentenced to death on 19 July 1947.

== Personal background ==
Rainer was a native of Sankt Veit an der Glan in Carinthia, the son of a German nationalist vocational teacher at a municipal Bürgerschule (secondary school). His father, Norbert, was a member of the German Democratic Party (Deutsche Demokratische Partei/DDP), and later the Greater German People's Party (Großdeutsche Volkspartei/GDVP). He attended the Realgymnasium in Klagenfurt and, having obtained his Matura degree, studied law at the University of Graz while he earned his living by working in a local banking institution or in general labour. After successfully completing his law examination, Rainer began working in a notary's office and completed his doctorate in 1926. From 1931 he worked as a notary public in Klagenfurt. He married Ada Pflüger on 21 May 1932. The couple had five children: three daughters and two sons.

== Early political involvement ==
Beginning in high-school, Rainer had been a member of right-wing organizations in Sankt Veit. He also participated in the armed Austro-Slovene conflict in Carinthia. Prior to his graduation from law school in Graz, he joined the Austrian SA in 1923 and joined a Burschenschaft student fraternity. In October 1930, Rainer joined the Nazi Party establishing the local branch in Sankt Veit. A close friend of Odilo Globocnik, he joined the Austrian SS at the end of 1933.

That same year he took up a post at the office of Nazi Gauleiter Hubert Klausner in Klagenfurt. As the Nazi Party had been banned by the Austrian government under Chancellor Engelbert Dollfuss in 1933, Rainer was in August 1935 sentenced to one year in police custody, presumably for high treason. He was released early for good behaviour the following March, nevertheless like Klausner and his deputy Globocnik he had to step down from his administrative role in the party, transferring sole leadership to the rival Austrian Nazi leader Josef Leopold.

== Gauleiter and Reich Governor ==
In the course of the Austrian Anschluss to Nazi Germany on 13 March 1938, Rainer was recruited to serve as the organizational staff leader in the office of Josef Bürckel, the Reichskommissar responsible for the annexation of the Austrian lands. On 22 May 1938, Rainer was personally appointed by Adolf Hitler as Gauleiter of the Nazi Party in the Reichsgau Salzburg. At the 4 April 1938 parliamentary election, he also was elected as a deputy to the Reichstag in Berlin from the Ostmark and he retained this seat until May 1945.

When World War II broke out, Rainer was appointed as Reich Defense Commissioner of Wehrkreis (Military District) XVIII, headquartered in Salzburg, which comprised his Reichsgau along with Reichsgau Carinthia, Reichsgau Styria and Reichsgau Tirol-Vorarlberg. This gave him control of civil defense matters over a very large area. On 15 March 1940, he was additionally appointed as the Reichsstatthalter (Reich Governor) of Salzburg, thus uniting under his control the highest party and governmental offices in his jurisdiction. Rainer remained in these offices at Salzburg until 27 November 1941, when he was succeeded by Gustav Adolf Scheel.

On 27 November 1941, Rainer was appointed as the Gauleiter and Reichsstatthalter of Reichsgau Carinthia, which also involved ruling over the adjacent occupied Yugoslavian territories in Upper Carniola. On 16 November 1942, Rainer was made Reich Defense Commissioner of Carinthia. On 21 June 1943 he was promoted to SS–Obergruppenführer. After the Kingdom of Italy signed an armistice with the Allies on 8 September 1943, Rainer took over the Operational Zone of the Adriatic Littoral as High Commissioner.

== Trial and death ==
On 7 May 1945, eight days after Hitler's suicide, Rainer transferred his official functions to an executive board and fled to the mountainous area around the Weißensee lake in Carinthia. After being given leads by the local population, British occupation troops arrested Rainer and transferred him to Nuremberg Prison in October 1945. On 12/13 June 1946, he appeared at the Nuremberg Trials as a defence witness for the former Austrian chancellor Arthur Seyss-Inquart.

On 13 March 1947, Rainer was extradited to Yugoslavia. Here he wrote an 80-page work on the Nürnberg Trials for Yugoslav authorities. On 10 July 1947, he was brought before a military court of the Yugoslav 4th Army at Ljubljana. He was found guilty of crimes against the people and sentenced to death by hanging on 19 July 1947. His widow received a death certificate from Yugoslavia after the war, which showed that same date. For decades afterward, the date of his execution was unknown and could only be speculated. In 2010, documentation came to light in the Slovenian National Archives in Ljubljana which may well have answered the question. An entry in the diary of Boris Kraigher, former interior minister in Slovenia, indicates that Rainer was executed with a number of other prisoners in late November 1950. He would have been 47 years old if this is correct. The long delay in Rainer's execution is reportedly due to Tito's secret police having utilized him as an informant. Upwards of 3,000 pages of his words, written from the summer of 1947 through late 1949, and probably into 1950, have been deposited in the Slovenian National Archives.

Nonetheless, well into the 1950s, there continued to be rumors that Rainer was still alive and working for the Yugoslav Department of State Security.

== Published works ==
- Rainer, Friedrich. On Brecht and Eisenstein, New York: Telos Press, issue 31, 1977.
- Rainer, Friedrich. My Internment and Testimony at the Nuremberg War Crimes Trial, Edwin Mellen Press Ltd; illustrated edition, 2006; ISBN 978-0-7734-5665-5

== Awards and decorations ==
- Degen (SS), 01.12.1938
- Anschluss Medal, c.1938
- Golden Party Badge, 30.01.1939
- Sudetenland Medal, c.1939
- Honour Chevron for the Old Guard
- SS-Ehrenring, 30.01.1942
- War Merit Cross 2nd Class Without Swords
- War Merit Cross 1st Class Without Swords
- Nazi Party Long Service Award in Bronze
- Nazi Party Long Service Award in Silver
- Order of Civil Merit (Bulgaria) 2nd Class
- Golden Hitler Youth Badge with Oak Leaves
