= Hubert Klausner =

German politician (1892–1939)

Landeshauptmann of Carinthia
- In office 1 June 1938 – 12 February 1939
- Preceded by: Wladimir von Pawlowski
- Succeeded by: Wladimir von Pawlowski

Gauleiter of Reichsgau Carinthia
- In office 22 May 1938 – 12 February 1939
- Deputy: Franz Kutschera
- Preceded by: Peter Feistritzer
- Succeeded by: Franz Kutschera

Gauleiter of Reichsgau Carinthia
- In office 4 May 1933 – 9 October 1936
- Preceded by: Hans vom Kothen
- Succeeded by: Peter Feistritzer

Personal details
- Born: 1 November 1892 Raibl, Austro-Hungarian Empire
- Died: 12 February 1939 (aged 46) Vienna, Austria
- Party: NSDAP

Hubert Klausner (1 November 1892 – 12 February 1939) was an Austrian military officer and Nazi politician. He served as Gauleiter of Reichsgau Kärnten and Landeshauptmann (premier) of Carinthia from 1938 to 1939.

== Early years ==
Born in Raibl (today: Cave del Predil, Tarvisio) in the Carinthian Val Canale, the son of a minor customs official, he attended the Gymnasium in Villach. Taking his Matura exams in 1912, he completed his military service as an Einjährig-Freiwilliger ("one-year volunteer") in the Austro-Hungarian Army. Thereafter, he served in World War I in the rank of a Leutnant in Galicia, where he was seriously wounded in 1915. He reached the rank of Oberleutnant at the Italian Front. In 1916, he was transferred to the reserve, commanding casualty assemblies in Klagenfurt and Trento.

When the war ended, Klausner from 1919 fought in the Volkswehr paramilitary forces in the armed conflicts against Yugoslav troops, which led to the Carinthian Plebiscite of 1920. Afterwards he joined the Federal Army of the First Austrian Republic and was promoted to the rank of Hauptmann (Captain). In 1930 he was promoted to major, the highest rank that he would reach in the Austrian Army before he had to leave for political reasons in 1933.

== Austrian Nazi Party ==
Having initially joined the Greater German People's Party, he switched to the Austrian Nazi Party in 1922, which he left in 1927. In February 1931, he once again joined the NSDAP, which won influence in local council and provincial elections in Carinthia in 1931 and 1932. Klausner was an early and ardent proponent of Nazism in Carinthia. He was appointed Deputy Gauleiter in January 1933, Bezirksleiter (District Leader) of Klagenfurt in March, and on 5 May 1933, he advanced to the position of Gauleiter of the still-outlawed Nazi Party in Carinthia. Klausner's influence grew during the incarceration of Austrian Nazi Party Leader (Landesleiter) Josef Leopold in 1935-1936 and he was viewed by some as the de facto party leader. During the time of Austrofascism in the Federal State of Austria (Ständestaat), Klausner was interned for a few months several times in 1935, 1936 and 1937.

His arrests for political reasons however, could not keep him from further advancing the Nazi movement. His home in Latschach near Finkenstein became a venue for meetings with other leading Carinthian Nazis such as Friedrich Rainer and Odilo Globocnik. Klausner resigned as Gauleiter on 9 October 1936 in a policy dispute with Leopold, who favored a more independent Austrian approach as opposed to the Greater-German ideas of Klausner and his associates. Things reached a climax on 21 February 1938 when Leopold was removed as Landesleiter of the Nazi Party by Adolf Hitler and replaced with Klausner.

== Anschluss ==
On the eve of the Austrian Anschluss to Nazi Germany on 12 March 1938, Klausner received Reichsführer-SS Heinrich Himmler at the Vienna airport. Klausner announced the Anschluss on Austrian radio and joined the SS immediately afterwards, in the rank of Oberführer.

The next day, Klausner was appointed by the new Nazi Chancellor Arthur Seyss-Inquart to be "Minister for Political Decision Making" in the first Nazi cabinet. At the parliamentary election of 10 April, he obtained a seat as a deputy to the Reichstag from the newly renamed Ostmark. On 23 April, he became deputy to Josef Bürckel, the Reichskommissar for the Reunification of Austria with the German Reich. Then, on 22 May he again was named Gauleiter of Gau Carinthia, and also became deputy to Bürckel in his capacity as Reichsstatthalter of Ostmark. Along with all this, he also attained, as of 1 June 1938, the office of Landeshauptmann of Carinthia. He thus united under his control the highest party and governmental offices in his jurisdiction. While he was in Vienna assisting Bürckel, his duties as Gauleiter and Landeshauptmann were exercised by his deputies Franz Kutschera and Wladimir von Pawlowski, respectively. On 9 November 1938, Klausner was promoted to SS-Brigadeführer.

At the height of his power, Hubert Klausner died suddenly on 12 February 1939 in his home in Vienna, officially of a stroke. Adolf Hitler together with Reinhard Heydrich and Rudolf Hess attended Klausner's state funeral in Klagenfurt, where Hitler delivered the commemorative address.
