= Alfred Rodenbücher =

German naval officer (1900–1980)

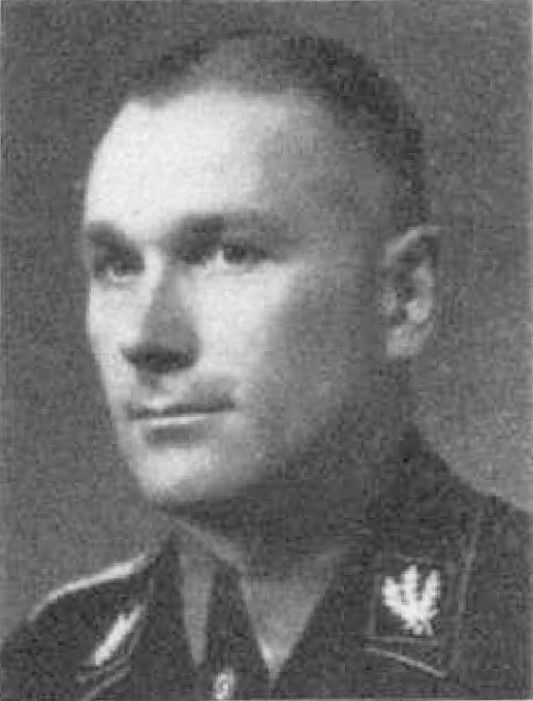
- Born: 29 September 1900; Schopfheim, Grand Duchy of Baden, German Empire
- Died: 29 March 1980 (aged 79); Emmendingen, Baden-Württemberg, West Germany
- Military career
- Allegiance: German Empire; Weimar Republic; Nazi Germany
- Branch: Imperial German Navy; Reichsmarine; Schutzstaffel; Kriegsmarine
- Service years: 1916-30; 1931-1945
- Rank: SS-Gruppenführer; Korvettenkapitän
- Commands: Higher SS and Police Leader, Alpenland
- Conflicts: World War I World War II
- Awards: Iron Cross, 1st and 2nd class

Alfred Rodenbücher (29 September 1900 – 29 March 1980) was a German naval officer, Nazi Party politician and Higher SS and Police Leader (HSSPF).

== Early life ==
Rodenbücher was born in Schopfheim, the son of a textile dyer. He was orphaned as a child and after attending volksschule and trade school, worked in several factories from spring 1915. In October 1916, during the First World War, he enlisted in the Imperial German Navy. He served aboard many ships, including the SMS König Wilhelm, SMS Charlotte and SMS Roon. He also served on torpedo boats through the war and was present at the scuttling of the German fleet at Scapa Flow. At the conclusion of the war, he remained in the Reichsmarine and served aboard the battleship SMS Hannover and the light cruiser SMS Berlin. He transferred to land duty and served at various naval training facilities until leaving the navy with the rank of Oberbootsmann (Chief Petty Officer) in September 1930.

== Career with the SS ==
Rodenbücher joined the Nazi Party (membership number 413,447) on 1 January 1931 and the SS (membership number 8,229) on 15 June 1931. In October 1931 he was promoted to SS-Standartenführer and commanded the 40th SS-Standarte based in Kiel. Upon his promotion to SS-Oberführer in October 1932, he moved to Bremen as commander of the SS-Abschnitt (Section) XIV there. After the Nazi seizure of power, he became a State Councilor in the State of Bremen for two months from September 1933.

On 19 June 1933, the Austrian Nazi Party and its paramilitary formations were banned. However, Rodenbücher was given command of the underground SS-Abschnitt VIII, headquartered in Linz, Austria. Promoted to SS-Brigadeführer in December, he retained command there until 15 February 1934. He then became the first commander of the SS-Oberabschnitt (Main Section) Österreich, leading all underground SS formations in Austria. However, only five months later, he returned to Germany following the failed July Putsch, though retaining nominal command in Austria until 9 September 1934. On that date, he was promoted to SS-Gruppenführer and put in charge of the Party's relief organization for Austrian SS refugees until November 1938. In March 1936, Rodenbücher was elected to the Reichstag from electoral constituency 23, Düsseldorf West, and retained this seat until the end of the Nazi regime.

From 25 April 1939 to 30 April 1941, Rodenbücher occupied the new position of Higher SS and Police Leader (HSSPF) Alpenland based in Salzburg, and from 1 June simultaneously commanded the SS-Oberabschnitt Alpenland. He was relieved of both positions for conspiring with the Gauleiter of Reichsgau Carinthia, Franz Kutschera, to absorb Reichsgau Salzburg into his jurisdiction. Rodenbücher was offered the lower position of SS Police Leader (SSPF) in the new German administration of Latvia but refused the posting. He was then technically transferred to the staff of Reichsführer-SS Heinrich Himmler. However, in reality, he was posted to the Kriegsmarine until the end of the war. He acquitted himself well, rising to the rank of Korvettenkapitän and earning the Iron Cross, 1st and 2nd class. After the end of the war, Rodenbücher was held by the British as a prisoner of war until 1948.

== Sources ==
- Klee, Ernst (2007). Das Personenlexikon zum Dritten Reich. Wer war was vor und nach 1945. Frankfurt-am-Main: Fischer-Taschenbuch-Verlag. ISBN 978-3-596-16048-8.
- McNab, Chris (2009). The SS: 1923–1945. London: Amber Books. ISBN 978-1-90662-649-5.
- Miller, Michael D.; Schulz, Andreas (2017). Gauleiter: The Regional Leaders of the Nazi Party and Their Deputies, 1925–1945. Vol. 2 (Georg Joel - Dr. Bernhard Rust). R. James Bender Publishing. ISBN 978-1-932-97032-6.
- Yerger, Mark C. (1997). Allgemeine-SS: The Commands, Units and Leaders of the General SS. Schiffer Publishing Ltd. ISBN 0-7643-0145-4.

== External Weblink ==
- Information about Alfred Rodenbücher in the Reichstag database
