= Inglorious Bastards =

Inglorious Bastards may refer to:

- The Inglorious Bastards (Quel maledetto treno blindato), a 1978 Italian action/war film directed by Enzo G. Castellari
- Inglourious Basterds, a 2009 war film written and directed by Quentin Tarantino
- The Real Inglorious Bastards, a 2012 short film documentary about the OSS officers who volunteered to operate behind enemy lines during Operation Greenup
- "Inglorious Bastards", a track from Clipse’s 2025 album Let God Sort Em Out

== See also ==
- "Inglorious", a track from Tyler, the Creator's 2009 album Bastard
