= Franz Hofer =

Austrian politician and Nazi Party official (1902–1975)

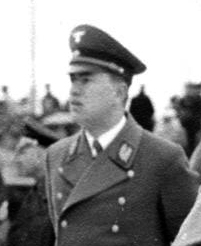
- Franz Hofer

Gauleiter of Gau Tyrol
- In office November 27, 1932 – July 28, 1934
- Preceded by: Rudolf Riedel
- Succeeded by: Friedrich Plattner

Gauleiter of Reichsgau Tirol-Vorarlberg
- In office May 25, 1938 – May 6, 1945
- Preceded by: Position created
- Succeeded by: Position abolished

Landeshauptmann of Tyrol
- In office May 25, 1938 – April 1, 1940
- Preceded by: Edmund Christoph
- Succeeded by: Position abolished

Reichsstatthalter of Reichsgau Tirol-Vorarlberg
- In office April 1, 1940 – May 6, 1945
- Preceded by: Position created
- Succeeded by: Position abolished

Supreme Commissioner of Operation Zone of the Alpine Foothills
- In office September 19, 1943 – May 6, 1945
- Preceded by: Position created
- Succeeded by: Position abolished

Personal details
- Born: November 27, 1902 Bad Hofgastein, Cisleithania, then part of Austria-Hungary
- Died: February 18, 1975 (aged 72) Mülheim an der Ruhr, North Rhine-Westphalia, West Germany
- Known for: Nazi Party leader

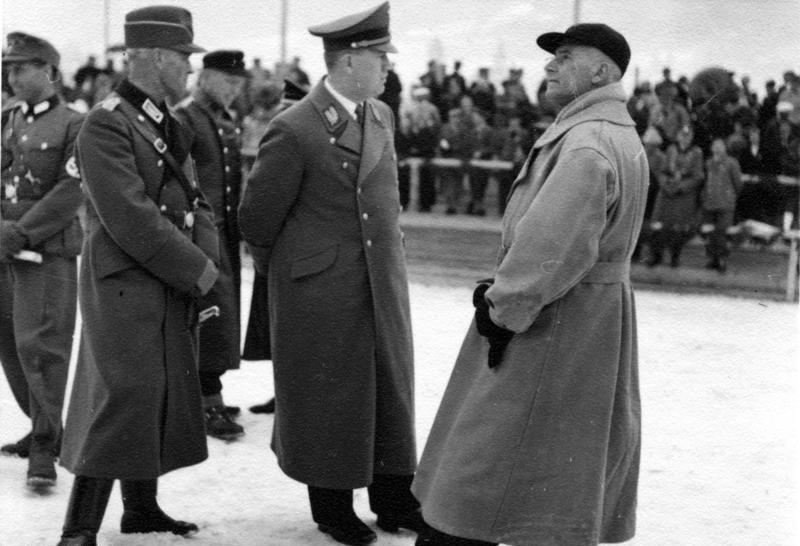
Franz Hofer (centre) at the Greater German Ski Championship Competition - February 1939. On the right; Wilhelm Frick (executed for war crimes at Nuremberg in 1946).

Franz Hofer (November 27, 1902 – February 18, 1975) was an Austrian Nazi politician.

He was Gauleiter (party leader) in Tyrol and Vorarlberg and, during the Third Reich, the most powerful figure in the region. Hofer dealt directly with Adolf Hitler or with the Führer's secretary, Martin Bormann.

Hofer was also the Reichskommissar in charge of the Tirol-Vorarlberg defences. His region embraced much of the suspected National Redoubt. Indeed, Hofer might well be considered the father of the Redoubt.

== Early career ==
Born to a Bad Hofgastein hotelkeeper, Hofer went to the Volksschule-Realschule in Innsbruck and in 1922 began a career as a freelance salesman. In September 1931, he joined the Nazi Party. He very quickly rose in the Party, becoming Kreisleiter (County Leader) in Innsbruck on April 1, 1932, and on July 1, Deputy Gauleiter of the Tyrol. Only four months later, on November 27, 1932 – Hofer's thirtieth birthday – he was promoted to Gauleiter of the Tyrol.

For his activities in the Nazi Party, which was banned in Austria, Hofer was arrested in June 1933 and sentenced for treason by a Tyrolean court to 30 months in prison. On August 30, 1933, 4 armed SA men broke into Hofer's prison cell by force and freed him. He fled the prison amid gunfire, which wounded him in the knee. He made it to Italy, and only a few weeks later gave a speech at the Nuremberg Party Congress from his stretcher. In early 1937, having recovered from his gunshot wounds, Hofer became leader of the "Leaders' and Members' Political Gathering Place for Austrians in Germany", with a job in Berlin.

== Anschluss and war years ==
After the Anschluss of March 1938, Hofer was elected to the Reichstag on April 10 as a Nazi deputy from the newly renamed Ostmark. Then on May 25, he was appointed the Gauleiter of Reichsgau Tyrol-Vorarlberg. At the same time, he was made Landeshauptmann of Tyrol (though not of Vorarlberg). On November 9, 1939 he was promoted to the rank of NSKK-Obergruppenführer. On September 1, 1940 he was appointed the Reichsstatthalter (Reich Governor) of the Reichsgau of Tyrol-Vorarlberg. He thus united under his control the highest party and governmental offices in his jurisdiction. On November 16, 1942, he was appointed the Reich Defense Commissioner for his Reichsgau.

After the Italian Armistice with the Allies Hofer was chosen on September 10, 1943 to be the Supreme Commissioner (Oberster Kommissar) of the newly established Operation Zone of the Alpine Foothills, consisting of the neighbouring Italian provinces of Belluno, Alto Adige and Trentino joined to his own Reichsgau. On September 25, 1944, he was named the commander of the Volkssturm, the Nazi Party militia forces, in his Reichsgau.

Gauleiter Hofer was an accomplished marksman who often competed in regional and national shooting matches. In 1944 Hofer won a shooting competition in the city of Bolzano, qualifying him for the national competition which was held in Innsbruck that year. Using a specially crafted 22 cal Mauser rifle (serial #300354) Hofer finished 7th.

In November 1944, Hofer suggested in a memorandum to Adolf Hitler that an "Alpenfestung" ("Alpine Fortress") ought to be built up in the heart of the Alps as Nazi Germany's last bastion. Apparently Hitler's secretary Martin Bormann only brought this document to the Führer's attention early the next year. Hofer had a personal audience with Hitler in late January 1945. 'Hofer reminded the German leader that the Allies dreaded the thought of continued fighting from an Alpenfestung. Considering the fact that the Ardennes Offensive had failed, Hitler was receptive to such an idea. The German leader authorized preparations to fortify the Alps.' Hofer and his team actually started work on this in mid-February. Hofer was called to Hitler's Berlin bunker again on April 12, 1945 to discuss further his proposal. Hitler – 18 days before his own suicide and still convinced that his Endsieg was possible – again approved Hofer's ongoing plan and appointed him Reich Defence Commissioner of the Alpenfestung.

== Postwar years ==
On May 3, 1945 Hofer surrendered Innsbruck to American troops. This surrender was achieved by OSS agent Frederick Mayer.

It was not long before Hofer's freedom was curtailed. On May 6, 1945, he was arrested by the United States Army in Hall in Tirol and held in an internment camp. In October 1948, he managed to flee to Germany, where he continued his former trade as a salesman in Mülheim, first under an assumed name and then under his true name.

In June 1949, Hofer was tried in absentia and convicted of high treason by the People's Court in Innsbruck and was sentenced to death. The conviction was on the grounds that he had been a leading Nazi Party member and a key advocate for the Anschluss. Meanwhile in Germany, he was classified as a "major offender", tried by the High Court of Justice in Munich and sentenced to ten years in a labor camp in June 1949.

In August 1952, he was re-tried in Munich and sentenced to 3 years and 5 months in labor prison, with credit for time already served. This sentence was upheld on appeal in July 1953. When interviewed by the press during this time, Hofer was unrepentant and declared an ongoing and fervent belief in Nazism.

In 1964, a lawsuit brought by Hofer's children for the return of ownership of the Lachhof bei Hall where their father had lived while he was the Gauleiter, was dismissed by an Austrian court.

Hofer spent his later years in Mülheim an der Ruhr with his wife and seven children, continued his former trade as a salesman and died a natural death on February 18, 1975, under his real name.
