= Franz Kutschera =

Austrian Nazi politician and government official (1904–1944)

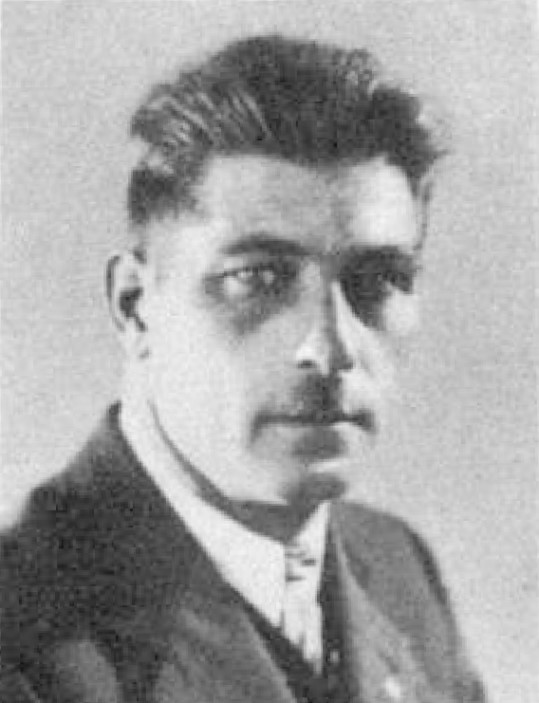
- Kutschera in about 1938

SS and Police Leader of Warsaw
- In office 25 September 1943 – 1 February 1944
- Preceded by: Jürgen Stroop
- Succeeded by: Paul Otto Geibel

SS and Police Leader of Mogilev
- In office 5 May 1943 – 20 September 1943
- Preceded by: Georg-Henning Graf von Bassewitz-Behr
- Succeeded by: Hans Haltermann

Gauleiter of Reichsgau Carinthia
- In office 12 February 1939 – 27 November 1941
- Preceded by: Hubert Klausner
- Succeeded by: Friedrich Rainer

Personal details
- Born: 22 February 1904 Oberwaltersdorf, Austria-Hungary
- Died: 1 February 1944 (aged 39) Warsaw, German-occupied Poland
- Party: NSDAP

Military service
- Allegiance: Nazi Germany
- Years of service: 1931-1944
- Rank: SS-Brigadefuhrer
- Unit: Schutzstaffel

Franz Kutschera (22 February 1904 – 1 February 1944) was an Austrian Nazi politician, SS-Brigadefuhrer and government official. He held numerous political and administrative offices with the Nazi Party and the Schutzstaffel (SS) both before and after the Anschluss of Austria in 1938. During World War II, he served in France, Yugoslavia, the Soviet Union and, finally, Poland.

In 1943, Kutschera was appointed the SS and Police Leader in German-occupied Warsaw. Due to his crimes against Poles, including Polish Jews, the Polish Home Army, in agreement with the Polish government in exile, targeted him for assassination. He was also nicknamed as the "Butcher of Warsaw" due to his brutality. On 1 February 1944, he was gunned down in front of the SS headquarters in Warsaw in a special operation by Kedyw, a dedicated resistance special operations unit. In reprisal, the Germans executed 300 Polish civilians.

== Life ==
Kutschera was born in Oberwaltersdorf, Lower Austria (then part of the Austro-Hungarian Empire) on 22 February 1904 and was the son of a professional gardener and minor civil servant. After primary school he served as a cabin boy in the Austro-Hungarian Navy from 1918–19 and, afterward, attended gymnasium in Villach. He later enrolled briefly at a machinists school in Budapest before training to become a gardener like his father. For several years, Kutschera resided in Opava and Karlovy Vary in the Sudetenland region of Czechoslovakia.

=== Early Nazi career ===
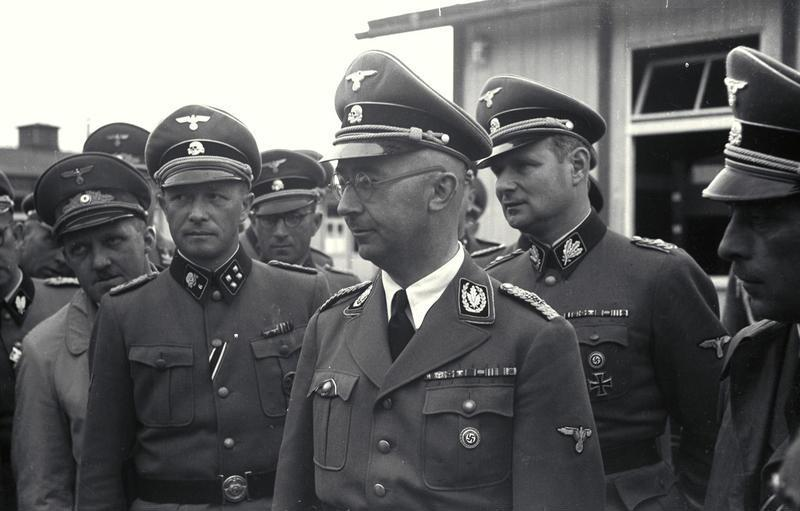
Heinrich Himmler (front) visiting KZ Mauthausen in April 1941, with August Eigruber (far left), Franz Ziereis (left), Karl Wolff (right) and Franz Kutschera (far right)

Kutschera joined the Austrian Nazi Party in December 1930 (NSDAP # 363,031) and the Schutzstaffel (SS) in November 1931 (SS # 19,659). The Nazi Party in Austria was banned in July 1933 by the Austrofascist government of Engelbert Dollfuss. Despite the government ban, Kutschera remained a committed Party activist and was arrested several times by Austrian authorities for illegal pro-Nazi political activities. From 1933 he served as an SS-Truppführer in Carinthia and subsequently joined the Sicherheitsdienst (SD) in 1934. Kutschera was also appointed Deputy Leader of the Nazi Party in Carinthia later that same year. In July 1935 he was named Commander of the 90th SS-Standarte in Klagenfurt, serving in this capacity until March 1938.

After the Austrian Anschluss to Nazi Germany in March 1938, Kutschera joined the civil administration of the newly-established Reichsgau Carinthia as an aide to Gauleiter Hubert Klausner. Following the 10 April 1938 election and referendum, Kutschera became a member of the Großdeutscher Reichstag, maintaining this position until his death. On 24 May he was formally appointed Deputy-Gauleiter, essentially running the Gau during Klausner's frequent absences in Vienna in his capacity as deputy to Reichskommissar Josef Bürckel.

In February 1939, he was also appointed to the People's Court as a lay judge and upon Klausner's sudden death on 12 February, Kutschera was elevated to the post of Acting-Gauleiter for Carinthia.

=== World War II ===
Shortly after the outbreak of World War II, Kutschera was named the representative in Carinthia of Friedrich Rainer, the Reich Defense Commissioner for Wehrkreis (Military District) XVIII, who was headquartered in Salzburg. Kutschera volunteered for military service with the Wehrmacht in March 1940 and was assigned to the 139th Gebirgsjäger (light infantry) regiment of the 3rd Mountain Division. He was later transferred to the 6th Mountain Division and took part in the Battle of France, serving in the Vosges during May and June 1940.

He was promoted to the rank of SS-Brigadeführer in November 1940. During the German Balkan Campaign, on 14 April 1941 Kutschera was named Chief of Civil Administration for Slovenian Carinthia and Upper Carniola, which were administered as part of his Gau, and where he became infamous in the war against the Yugoslav Partisans for his fanaticism and extreme harshness. On 27 November 1941, Kutschera was dismissed as Gauleiter for reportedly plotting to absorb the neighboring Reichsgau Salzburg into his jurisdiction. He was succeeded by his rival, Friedrich Rainer, the Gauleiter in Salzburg.

In January 1942, Kutschera was seconded to the staff of Obergruppenführer Erich von dem Bach-Zelewski, the Higher SS and police leader (HSSPF) for Central Russia (Belarus), where he served as a representative of the Reich Commissariat for the Strengthening of German Nationhood (RKFDV). Soon after his arrival on the Eastern Front, Kutschera personally directed numerous anti-partisan and mass-killing operations in the occupied territories of the Soviet Union. In November 1942 he was given the rank of Generalmajor der Polizei and on 5 May 1943 he was appointed SS and Police Leader (SSPF) for the Mogilev district.

=== Warsaw ===
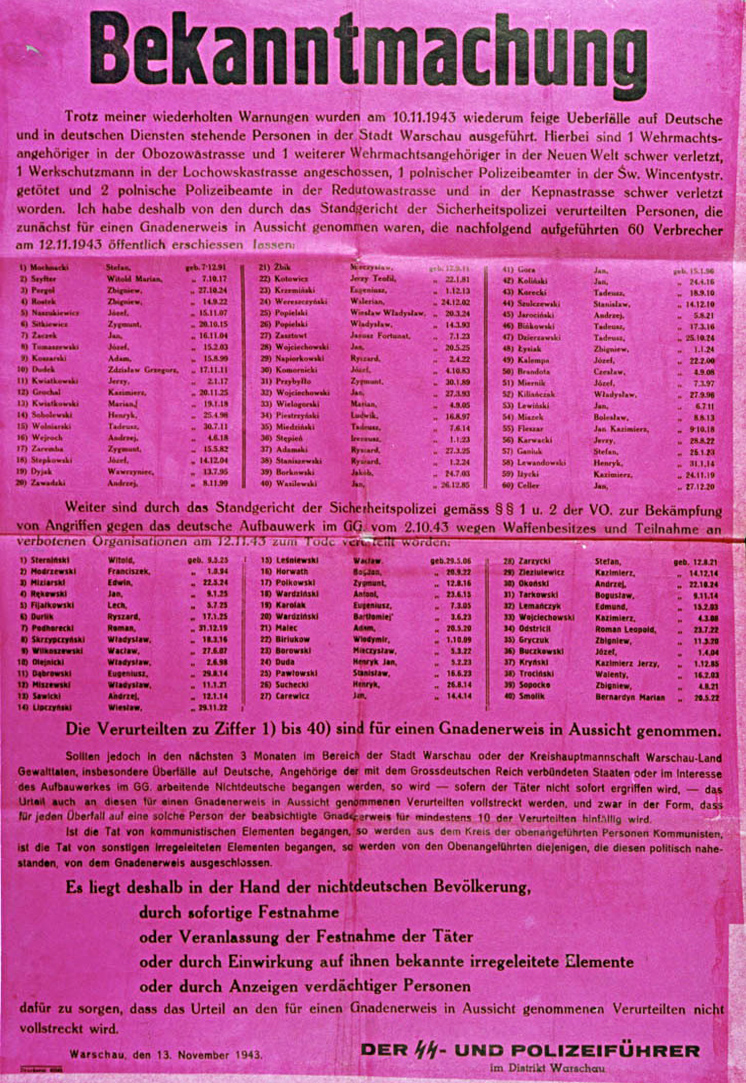
Warsaw SS and Police leader announcement of execution of 60 Polish hostages and sentencing to death of 40 more, November 1943

On 25 September 1943, Kutschera took office as SS and Police Leader for the Warsaw district of the General Government in occupied Poland. Once in power in Warsaw, he increased the number of roundups (łapanka) of Polish citizens and the number of hostage executions. From October 1943 to January 1944, around 5,000 Poles were killed under Kutschera's orders, 1,200 of them were executed in the streets or on the gallows. Every day lists were hung in public announcing the names of the next Poles to be executed in the event of any attack on a German soldier or police officer. These notices were always signed anonymously by the "Commander of the SS and Police at Warsaw District".

Kutschera's exact whereabouts while in Warsaw was a closely guarded secret within the Reich Security Main Office but were discovered in December 1943 by Aleksander Kunicki (Rayski), chief of intelligence for the Agat (Anti-Gestapo) unit of Kedyw. In the course of his routine surveillance of the Gestapo offices on Aleje Szucha, Rayski noticed an Opel Admiral limousine entering the driveway of the nearby Warsaw SS headquarters. The SS officer who emerged from the car wore the clearly identifiable rank and insignia of a Brigadeführer. Intrigued, Rayski began to secretly monitor the mysterious SS man's arrivals and departures from SS headquarters and filed a report with his superiors. An investigation by Kedyw in January 1944 confirmed that the man being observed by Rayski was Franz Kutschera.

=== Assassination ===
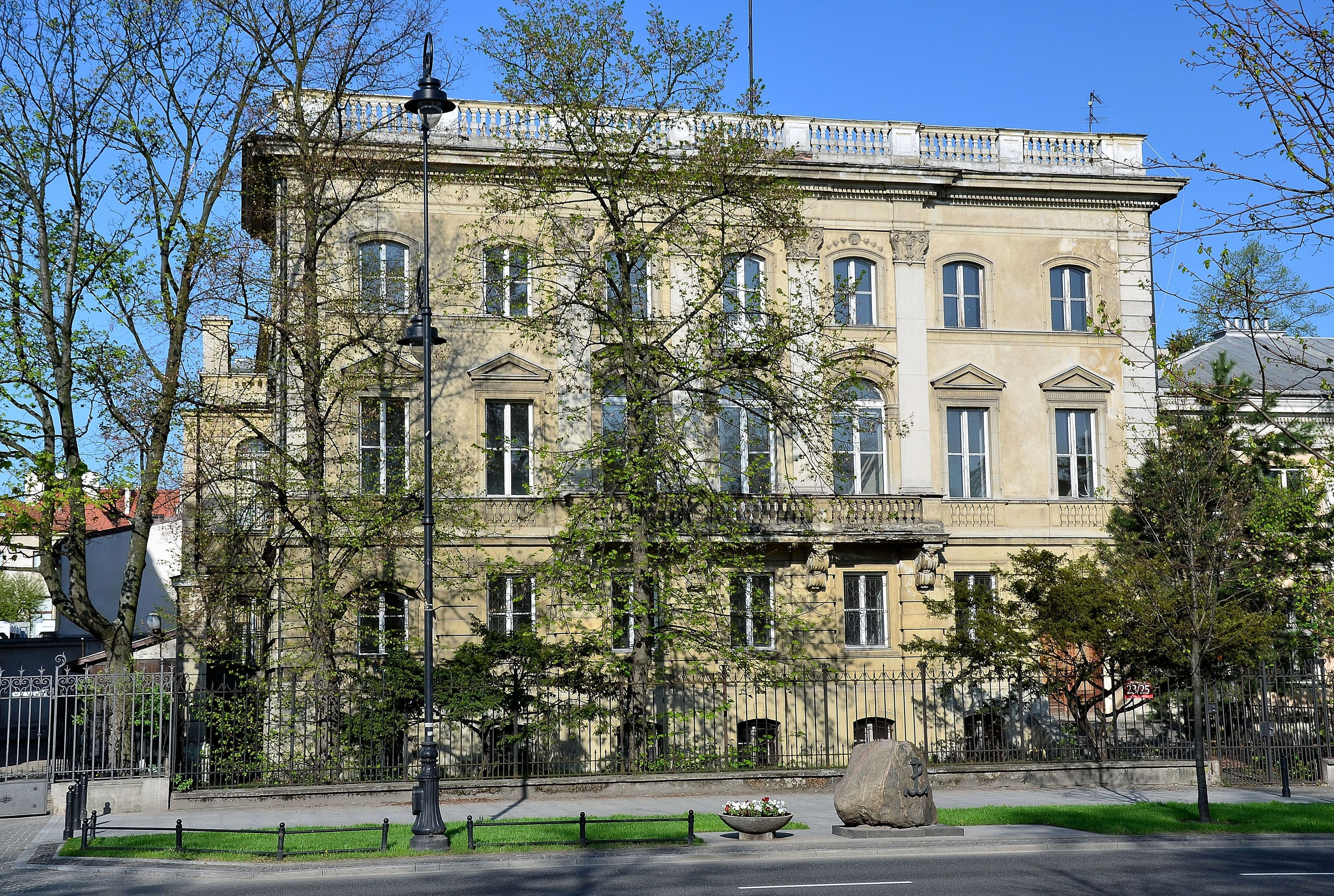
Leszczyński Palace Ujazdowskie 23

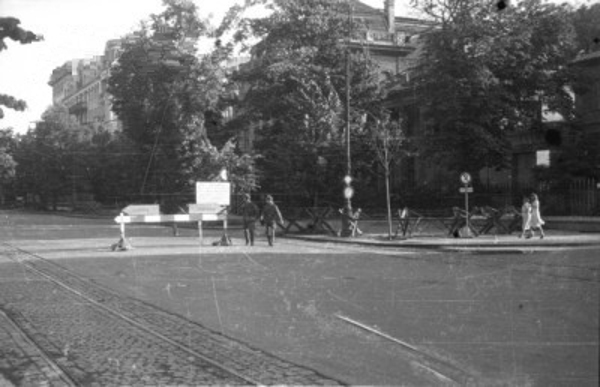
The site of the assassination. Behind the trees is building of Ujazdów Avenue 23 housing Headquarters for Warsaw district of SS and Police where Kutschera was assassinated.

Following his discovery by Rayski, Kutschera was tried in absentia by a secret Special Court of the Polish Underground State. He was charged with crimes against the Polish nation, in particular, the routine mass murder of Polish civilians in Warsaw. Kutschera was convicted and sentenced to death. In London the leadership of the Polish government-in-exile concurred with the decision of the Special Court and approved Kutschera's death sentence. The execution order was soon drafted and relayed to the commander of Kedyw, Brigadier General Emil August Fieldorf (Nil), whose organization had been given the tasks of planning and performing the assassination.

The execution was carried out by the combat-sabotage unit of Kedyw (the predecessor of Battalion Parasol). The assassination team consisted of 12 individual operatives, mostly members of the scouting and guiding Gray Ranks. It was planned to carry out the execution in front of the Warsaw SS Headquarters at 23 Ujazdów Avenue. On the morning of 1 February 1944 three Kedyw gunmen: Bronisław Pietraszewicz (Lot), who was armed with a German MP 40 submachine gun; Zdzisław Poradzki (Kruszynka), carrying a British Sten; and Michał Issajewicz (Miś), armed with a Luger pistol, ambushed Kutschera as his limousine approached SS Headquarters and opened fire directly into the car. Both Kutschera and his driver were shot multiple times and killed. A gun battle then erupted between the members of the assassination team and the responding German troops in which four Poles and two Germans were killed.

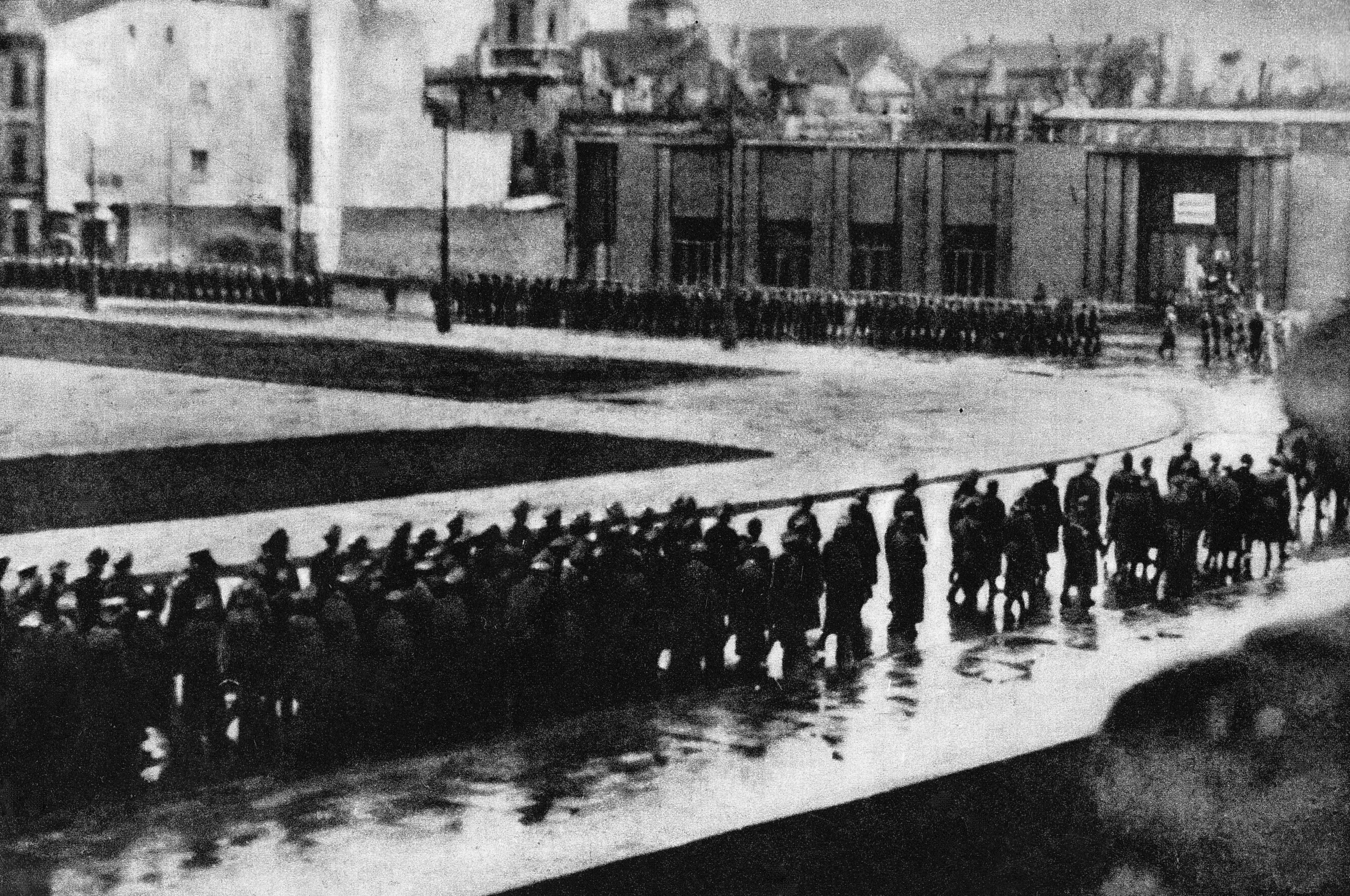
Franz Kutschera funeral in occupied Warsaw 1944

Kutschera's funeral ceremony was held by the Nazis at Brühl palace. Afterwards, his body was laid to rest on Heldenfriedhof part of Powązki Military Cemetery - not moved to Berlin or any part of Germany, as it was thought for decades. On 2 February 1944, the German authorities in Warsaw staged a public execution of 300 Polish civilian hostages as a reprisal for the assassination. The Germans also imposed a crushing 100 million złoty tribute on the Polish residents of Warsaw and Warsaw County. Kutschera was succeeded as SS and Police leader by SS-Oberführer Paul Otto Geibel in March 1944.

In 1990, during the construction of Aleja Prymasa Tysiąclecia in Warsaw, Kutschera's body was moved (together with over 2000 bodies of German soldiers) to the German military cemetery in Joachimów-Mogiły.

== Posthumous wife and son ==
On 4 February 1944, in Deutsches Haus in Warsaw, Kutschera's pregnant Norwegian girlfriend, Jane Lilian Gjertsdatter Steen (born on 9 December 1918), daughter of Gjert Henrik Gjertsen Steen and Magna (or Magda) Anette Hansdatter (née Gjengstø) Steen posthumously married Kutschera in accordance with pagan rituals. Notable guests at the wedding included Reichsführer-SS Heinrich Himmler and Teodora Żukowska, a Polish spy for the Home Army who worked at the District Governor's office in Warsaw.

Jane Kutschera (later Rognskog) died in Norway in 1994. Her son, Sepp Kutschera, became an Alpinist, who was the first to climb Koh-e Keshni Khan in the Hindukush mountains, in 1963. He died on 22 May 2004.

== Sources ==
- Dunin-Wąsowicz, Marek (1957) "Zamach na Kutscherę", Warszawa
- Mazower, Mark (2008) Hitler's Empire, Penguin Press, ISBN 978-1-59420-188-2
- Miller, Michael D.; Schulz, Andreas (2017). Gauleiter: The Regional Leaders of the Nazi Party and Their Deputies, 1925-1945. Vol. II (Georg Joel - Dr. Bernhard Rust). R. James Bender Publishing. ISBN 978-1-932970-32-6.
- Stachniewicz, Piotr (1982) "AKCJA "KUTSCHERA", Książka i Wiedza, Warszawa
