= German Student Union =

Organization of student unions in Weimar- and Nazi-era Germany

The German Student Union (German: Deutsche Studentenschaft, abbreviated DSt) from 1919 until 1945, was the merger of the general student committees of all German universities, including Danzig, Austria and the former German universities in Czechoslovakia.

The DSt was founded during the Weimar Republic period as a democratic representation of interests. It experienced serious internal conflicts in the early 1920s between the Republican minority and the völkisch majority wing. It was dominated from 1931 onward by the National Socialist German Students' League, which was merged on 5 November 1936 under Gustav Adolf Scheel with the DSt, played a large part in the Nazi book burnings and was eventually banned in 1945 as a Nazi organization.

On 6 May 1933, members of the DSt made an organised attack on the Institute of Sex Research in Berlin's Tiergarten area. A few days later, the institute's library and archives were hauled out and burned in the streets of the Opernplatz. Around 20,000 books and journals, and 5,000 images, were destroyed.

== Chairmen ==
Date	Chairman	Position
1919/20	Otto Benecke^{(de)}	(Verband der Vereine Deutscher Studenten^{(de)} Göttingen)
1920/21	Peter van Aubel^{(de)}	(Kath. Freie Vereinigung Cologne)
1921/22	Franz Holzwarth	(Göttingen)
1922/23	Fritz Hilgenstock^{(de)}	(Hannoversche Burschenschaft Arminia)^{(de)}
1923/24	Arthur Fritsch	(K.D.St.V. Winfridia Breslau^{(de)} im Cartellverband)
1924–26	Hellmut Bauer	(Burschenschaft Teutonia Kiel)
1926/27	Günter Thon	(Burschenschaft Arminia Brno)
1927–29	Walter Schmadel^{(de)}	(Burschenschaft Danubia München)^{(de)}
1929/30	Erich Hoffmann^{(de)}	(Corps Austria Frankfurt am Main)
1930/31	Hans-Heinrich Schulz	(Corps Hildeso-Guestphalia Göttingen)^{(de)}
1931	Walter Lienau^{(de)}	(NSDStB and Corps Isaria München)^{(de)}
1931–33	Gerhard Krüger	(NSDStB and Burschenschaft Arminia Greifswald im ADB)^{(de)}
1933/34	Oskar Stäbel^{(de)}	(NSDStB and Landsmannschaft Suevia Karlsruhe)
Jul 1934 – Feb 36	Andreas Feickert^{(de)}	(NSDStB Hamburg)
Feb 1936 - 1945	Gustav Adolf Scheel	(as Reichsstudentenführer leader of both DSt and NSDStB)

== See also ==
- Sozialistischer Deutscher Studentenbund (1946–)
