= National Socialist German Students' League =

Organisation of the Nazi party for young students

National Socialist German Students' Union
- Nationalsozialistischer Deutscher Studentenbund
- Emblem of the NSDStB
- Formation: February 1926; 100 years ago
- Dissolved: October 10, 1945; 80 years ago
- Type: School monitoring organization
- Legal status: Defunct, illegal
- Region served: Germany
- Parent organization: Nazi Party

The National Socialist German Students' Union (German: Nationalsozialistischer Deutscher Studentenbund, abbreviated NSDStB) was founded in 1926 as a division of the Nazi Party with the mission of integrating University-level education and academic life within the framework of the Nazi worldview. Organized (as with other departments of the Nazi Party) strictly in accord with the Führerprinzip (or "leader principle") as well as the principle of Machtdistanz (or "power distance"), the NSDStB housed its members in so-called Kameradschaftshäusern (or "Fellowship Houses"), and (from 1930) had its members decked out in classic brown shirts and its own distinctive Swastika emblems.

After Germany's defeat in World War II, the Nazi Party along with its divisions and affiliated organisations were declared "criminal organizations" and banned by the Allied Control Council on October 10, 1945.

== Leaders, 1926–45 ==
- 1926–28 Wilhelm Tempel
- 1928–32 Baldur von Schirach (from 1931 also Reichsjugendführer)
- 1932–33 Gerd Rühle
- 1933–34 Oskar Stäbel
- 1934–36 Albert Derichsweiler
- 1936–45 Gustav Adolf Scheel (as Reichsstudentenführer Scheel was also Führer of the Deutschen Studentenschaft)

== Other notable members ==
- Kurt Waldheim, later Secretary General of the United Nations, President of Austria.

== See also ==
- German Student Union
