= Reichsstatthalter =

1879–1945 German territorial governor office

Seals for the Reichsstatthalter

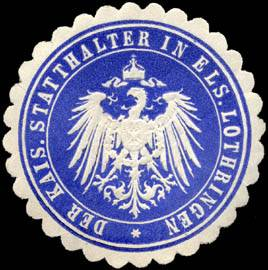
German Empire

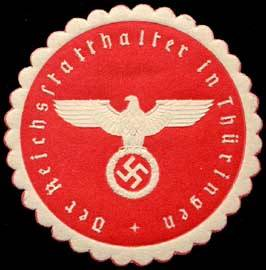
Nazi Germany

The Reichsstatthalter (German: [ˈʁaɪçsˌʃtathaltɐ], Reich viceroy) was a title used in the German Empire and later in Nazi Germany.

== Statthalter des Reiches (1879–1918) ==
The office of Statthalter des Reiches (otherwise known as Reichsstatthalter) was instituted in 1879 by the German Empire for the areas of Alsace (Elsaß) and Lorraine (Lothringen) that France had ceded to Germany following the Franco-Prussian War. It was a form of governorship intended to exist while Alsace-Lorraine became a federal state of the Empire. It was abolished when Alsace-Lorraine was, in turn, ceded back to France after Germany lost World War I.

Incumbents
1 October 1879 – 17 June 1885	Edwin von Manteuffel (1809–1885)
17 June 1885 – 5 November 1885	Karl von Hofmann (acting) (1827–1910)
5 November 1885 – 29 October 1894	Chlodwig zu Hohenlohe-Schillingfürst (1819–1901)
5 November 1894 – 31 October 1907	Hermann zu Hohenlohe-Langenburg (1832–1913)
21 November 1907 – April 1914	Karl von Wedel (1842–1919)
1 May 1914 – 14 October 1918	Johann von Dallwitz (1855–1919)
22 October – 12 November 1918	Rudolf Schwander (1868–1950)

== Nazi Germany ==
The states of Germany during the Weimar Republic. Waldeck-Pyrmont joined Prussia in 1929; the Saar territory was a League of Nations protectorate until 1935, Danzig was a city-state independent from Germany.

During the Third Reich, the Nazis re-created the office of Reichsstatthalter (Reich Governor or Reich Deputy) to gain direct control over all states (other than Prussia) after winning the general elections of 1933. Their independent state governments and parliaments were successively abolished, and the Reich government took over direct control in a process called Gleichschaltung ("coordination"). Prussia's government had already been taken over by the Reich a year earlier in the Preußenschlag under Chancellor Franz von Papen.

Two weeks after the passage of the Enabling Act of 1933, which effectively made Adolf Hitler the dictator of Germany, the Nazi government issued the "Second Law on the Coordination of the States with the Reich" (Zweites Gesetz zur Gleichschaltung der Länder mit dem Reich) on 7 April 1933. This law deployed one Reich Governor in each of Germany's 17 states. The Reich Governors were given the task of overseeing the fulfillment of Hitler's political guidelines in the states. Indeed, the law required them to carry out "the general policy of the Chancellor." In practice, they acted with complete authority over the state governments. The governors' main authorities lay in:

- appointing and dismissing the state minister-president
- dissolving the state parliament and calling new elections
- issuing and announcing state laws
- appointing and dismissing important state agents and judges
- granting amnesty

In Prussia, the largest of the German states, Hitler took direct control by appointing himself as Reichsstatthalter. However, he delegated his authority to Hermann Göring, who had been installed as Minister President of Prussia without an election. The Prussian provinces were administered by an Oberpräsident, usually the local Gauleiter.

=== Law on the Reconstruction of the Reich (1934) ===
The Law on the Reconstruction of the Reich (Gesetz über den Neuaufbau des Reichs) passed on 30 January 1934; it formally de-federalized the Reich for the first time in its history. However, Germany had effectively become a highly centralized state with the passage of the Enabling Act and the posting of the Reich Governors. The state parliaments were abolished, and their sovereign powers were transferred to the Reich government. The Reich Governors were made responsible to the Reich Minister of the Interior, Wilhelm Frick. For all intents and purposes, the states were reduced to provinces.

=== Reich Governors Law (1935) ===
The Reich Governors Law (Reichsstatthaltergesetz) of 30 January 1935 formally designated the Reich Governors as the representatives of the Reich government, tasked with watching over the execution of Hitler's political guidelines. They received the authority to "inform" the provincial authorities about these guidelines, as well as the measures necessary to fulfill them. In practice, the Führerprinzip meant that this "information" amounted to an order.

The Reichsstatthalter were now also empowered to take over all functions of state government, and also appointed the mayors of all towns and cities with populations fewer than 100,000. This had the effect of giving the Reich Interior Ministry near-complete control over local government. The Interior Minister directly appointed the mayors of all cities with populations greater than 100,000 (though Hitler reserved the right to appoint the mayors of Berlin and Hamburg himself if he deemed it necessary), and as mentioned above, the Reich Governors were responsible to him.

=== Anschluss ===
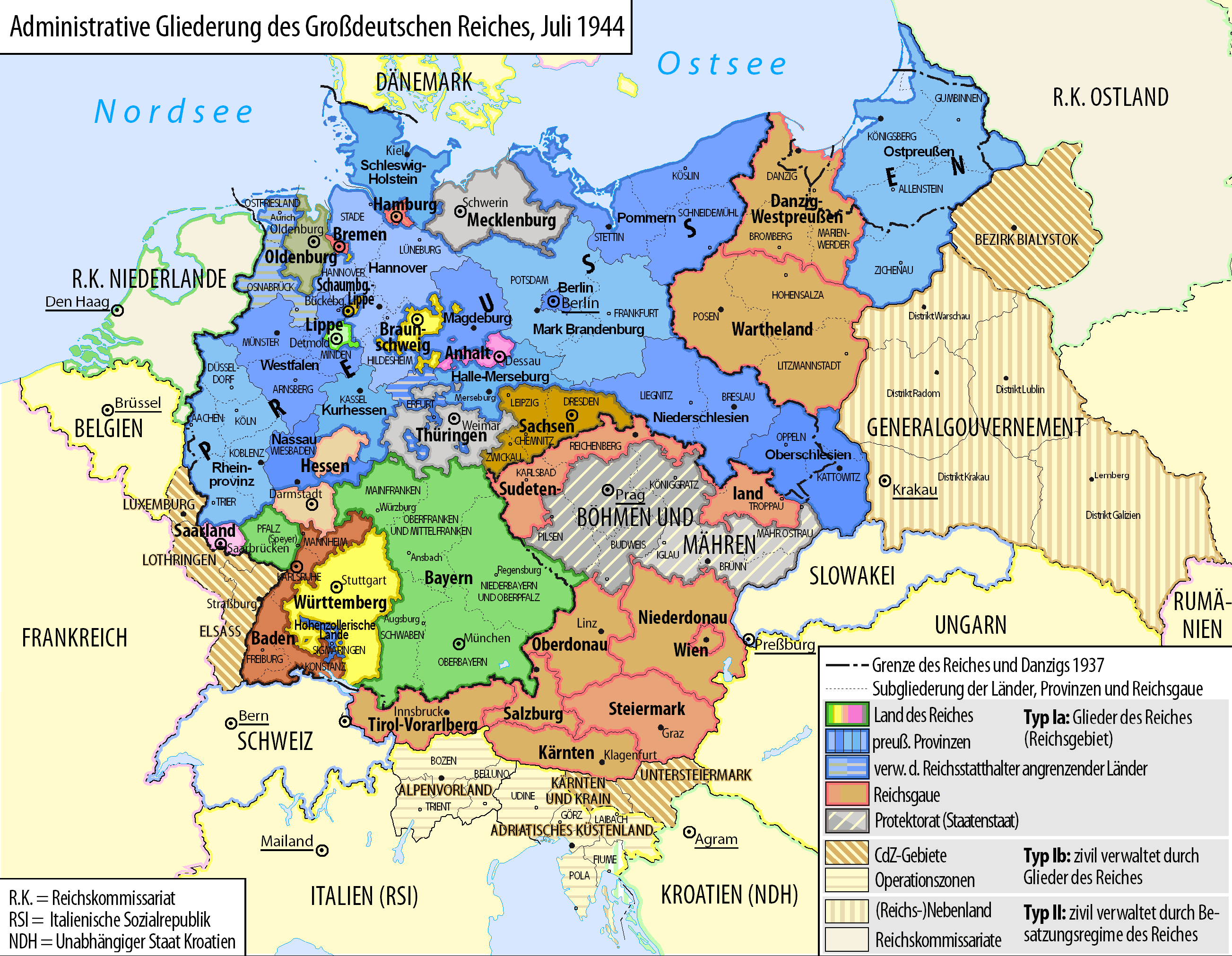
The (de facto abolished) states and annexed areas of Nazi Germany, 1944

After Austria's Anschluss ("union") with Germany, its last pre-Anschluss Chancellor, Arthur Seyss-Inquart, became its first Reichsstatthalter and Führer der Österreichischen Landesregierung (Leader of the Austrian State Government) from 15 March 1938 to 30 April 1939. Also, Josef Bürckel was appointed Reichskommissar für die Wiedervereiningung Österreichs mit dem Deutschen Reich (Reich Commissioner for Reunification of Austria with the German Reich) from 23 April 1938 to 31 March 1940. At that point, each constitutive Land (with some differences in borders, e.g., Burgenland was partitioned away) was placed under the administration of its own Reichsstatthalter.

Reichsstatthalters of Germany
Statthalter district	Seat	Incumbent	Date of Appointment
Anhalt; Brunswick (Braunschweig)	Dessau	Wilhelm Friedrich Loeper; Fritz Sauckel (acting); Rudolf Jordan	5 May 1933; 29 November 1935; 19 April 1937
Baden	Karlsruhe	Robert Heinrich Wagner	5 May 1933
Bavaria (Bayern)	Munich	Franz Ritter von Epp	10 April 1933
Hamburg	Hamburg	Karl Kaufmann	16 May 1933
Hesse (Hessen)	Darmstadt	Jakob Sprenger	5 May 1933
Lippe; Schaumburg-Lippe	Detmold	Alfred Meyer	16 May 1933
Mecklenburg-Schwerin; Mecklenburg-Strelitz; Lübeck	Schwerin	Friedrich Hildebrandt	26 May 1933
Oldenburg; Bremen	Oldenburg	Carl Röver; Paul Wegener	5 May 1933; 27 May 1942
Prussia (Preußen)	Berlin	Adolf Hitler; Hermann Göring (acting)	25 April 1933; 30 January 1935
Saxony (Sachsen)	Dresden	Martin Mutschmann	5 May 1933
Thuringia (Thüringen)	Weimar	Fritz Sauckel	5 May 1933
Württemberg	Stuttgart	Wilhelm Murr	5 May 1933

Reichsstatthalters of areas annexed between 1939 and 1941
Statthalter district	Seat	Incumbent and Dates in Office
Sudetenland	Reichenberg	Konrad Henlein: 1 May 1939 – May 1945
Wartheland	Posen	Arthur Greiser: 21 October 1939 – 23 February 1945
Danzig-West Prussia (Danzig-Westpreußen)	Danzig	Albert Forster: 26 October 1939 – 2 April 1945
Carinthia (Kärnten)	Klagenfurt	Wladimir von Pawlowski: 1 April 1940 – 27 November 1941; Friedrich Rainer: 27 November 1941 – 7 May 1945 (from April 1941, Head of the Civil Government of Lower Carinthia and Upper Carniola; from 10 September 1943, also Special Commissioner for the Adriatisches Küstenland, i.e. the North Adriatic Littoral)
Lower Danube (Niederdonau)	Vienna	Hugo Jury: 1 April 1940 – 8 May 1945
Salzburg	Salzburg	Friedrich Rainer: 1 April 1940 – 29 November 1941; Gustav Adolf Scheel: 29 November 1941 – 4 May 1945
Styria (Steiermark)	Graz	Siegfried Uiberreither: 1 April 1940 – 8 May 1945
Tyrol-Vorarlberg (Tirol-Vorarlberg)	Innsbruck	Franz Hofer: 1 April 1940 – 3 May 1945 (from 10 September 1943, also Special Commissioner for the Alpenvorland 'Alpine Foothills', i.e. Italian South Tyrol-Belluno, Bozen (Bolzano) and Trentino when integrated into Tyrol)
Upper Danube (Oberdonau)	Linz	August Eigruber: 1 April 1940 – 5 May 1945
Vienna (Wien)	Vienna	Josef Bürckel: 1 April 1940 – 10 August 1940; Baldur von Schirach: 10 August 1940 – 12 April 1945
Westmark (Palatinate, the Saar, and Lorraine)	Saarbrücken	Josef Bürckel: 11 March 1941 – 28 September 1944; Willi Stöhr: 29 September 1944 – 21 March 1945

== See also ==
- Statthalter
