= Posthumous marriage in Germany =

Marriage practice in Nazi Germany

In Nazi Germany, it was practiced to marry the pregnant fiancée of a fallen soldier to his dead body in order to legalize, otherwise out of wedlock, the child and provide a bride with benefits of being a soldier widow.

== History ==
The possibility to marry a dead soldier was introduced by secret letter of Adolf Hitler from Nov 6, 1941. The legality of such a marriages was recognized by the British Occupation Forces in Germany, especially in Hamburg, where they were legally practised until Feb 28, 1946 and outside Hamburg until March 31, 1946.

The letter was legally discussed in the Palandt:Bürgerliches Gesetzbuch page 1912. The situation of the widows were regulated by the Gesetz über die Rechtswirkungen des Ausspruchs einer nachträglichen Eheschliessung — BGBl. I S 215.

== Notable examples ==
- Franz Kutschera was married to a Norwegian woman after his death.

== See also ==
- Posthumous marriage in France
- Chinese ghost marriage
