= Operational Zone of the Alpine Foothills =

Operational Zone of the Alpine Foothills Operationszone Alpenvorland
- 1943–1945
- Flag Emblem

- The Operational Zone of the Alpine Foothills ("OZAV")
- Capital: Bozen
- Government: Commissariat
- High Commissioner
  - 1943–1945: Franz Hofer
- History
  - Establishment: 1943
  - Disestablishment: 1945
Preceded by	Succeeded by
Kingdom of Italy	Kingdom of Italy
- Today part of: Italy

The Operational Zone of the Alpine Foothills (German: Operationszone Alpenvorland (OZAV); Italian: Zona d'operazione delle Prealpi) was a Nazi German occupation zone in the sub-Alpine area in Italy during World War II.

== Origin and geography ==
OZAV was established on 10 September 1943 by the occupying German Wehrmacht, as a response to the Allied Armistice with Italy proclaimed two days earlier following the Allied invasion of Italy. It comprised the provinces of Belluno, Bolzano and Trento. The Operational Zone of the Adriatic Littoral, comprising the provinces of Udine, Görz, Trieste, Pula, Rijeka, Kvarner Gulf and Ljubljana, was established on the same day. Both operational zones were separate from the Italian Social Republic (RSI), based in Salò on Lake Garda, which governed the remainder of Italy that had not yet been occupied by the Allies.

== Administration ==
OZAV was administered by High Commissioner Franz Hofer. The zone was administered as part of the Reichsgau of Tirol-Vorarlberg. The capital of the zone was Bolzano. Hofer wanted to amalgamate the operation zone to his Gau and thus bring forth the reunification of Tyrol and the territorial resurrection of the old Austrian crownland of Tyrol. This did not take place, as Hitler wanted to show consideration for Mussolini, although the Salo government had almost zero influence in the region during German rule.

The Italian influence was resisted and dismantled by the Germans, who decreed the restoration of the provincial borders of 1919 (plus the addition of Belluno), and forced the resignation of the ethnic Italian Podestà in South Tyrol who were replaced by German-speaking mayors recruited from the local population identifying with the Third Reich. In September 1943, the German language was given equal status with the Italian language. German and Ladin names of streets and localities were displayed alongside Italian names. Fascist and Italian-language newspapers were shut down and the importing of newspapers from the RSI was banned. The Fascist party was outlawed. Laws were introduced limiting the immigration of Italians escaping military service from the RSI. However, the Italian lira remained the legal tender.

The effect of these policies was a rapid and draconian reversal of the stringent policy of Italianization which had been imposed on the region by the Italian government beginning in the early 1920s. Military units in the region came under the Befehlshaber Operationszone Alpenvorland commanded by General der Infanterie Joachim Witthöft, a former divisional commander in the XXVII Army Corps of the German Army.

== Collaboration ==
Primary enforcement of German regulations was performed by the Südtiroler Ordnungsdienst (SOD, the "South Tyrol" civil police), which had been recruited from the ADO (Arbeitsgemeinschaft der Optanten für Deutschland or Association of Optants for Germany); it was mirrored in Trento (Trentino) by the Corpo di Sicurezza Trentino (CST) and in the Belluno province by the Corpo di Sicurezza Bellunese (CSB), both composed of people drafted from all male residents between the eighteen and fifty years of age. The SOD was also actively involved in the pursuit of the Jews and the well-known “Dableiber” (those who had chosen Italy when they were compelled to declare their allegiance), like Josef Mayr-Nusser, Michael Gamper, Friedl Volgger, Rudolf Posch, and Josef Ferrari. Many of the Dableiber were current or former Catholic priests and were persecuted by the Germans.

== Deportation of Jews from the Alpine Foothills ==
On 12 September 1943, almost immediately after the start of the German occupation, SS and police leader for the Alpine Foothills Karl Brunner issued an order that all Jews in the region were to be arrested. Many of those from the Jewish communities in the region were deported and murdered in the extermination camps. The region was also home to the Bolzano Transit Camp, which was active from summer 1944 until the end of the war and was used for the transit of Italian Jews to Auschwitz and other camps.

== Atrocities ==
The region was the scene of some of the last German atrocities during World War II. Towards the end of the war, South Tyrol saw the presence of over 70,000 German soldiers and members of the police, ready for a possible last defence. After the German surrender in Italy, celebrations of the Italian-speaking population broke out; which saw 11 people killed in Merano on 30 April and 41 people killed at Bolzano on 3 May 1945, when Wehrmacht and SS units fired on civilians. This and the ongoing encounters between German troops and Italian partisans has been referred to as the Battle of Bolzano (Italian: Battaglia di Bolzano). Blame for these killings has been laid on SS and police leader Karl Brunner, but also on the chaotic circumstances on both the Italian and German side following the surrender.

== See also ==
- Areas annexed by Nazi Germany
