= The Real Inglorious Bastards =

- Written by: Min Sook Lee
- Directed by: Min Sook Lee
- Starring: Frederick Mayer; Hans Wijnberg
- Narrated by: Robert Nolan
- Music by: Ken Myhr
- Country of origin: Canada
- Original language: English

Production
- Producer: Ed Barreveld
- Cinematography: Daniel Grant
- Editors: Dave Kazala; Bruce Lange
- Running time: 50 minutes
- Production company: Storyline Entertainment

Original release
- Network: History
- Release: November 8, 2012

The Real Inglorious Bastards is a Canadian television documentary film, directed by Min Sook Lee and released in 2012. The film depicts Operation Greenup, a real-life World War II mission in which the American Office of Strategic Services parachuted Jewish agents Frederick Mayer and Hans Wijnberg, and German Army deserter Franz Weber, into Austria to spy on the Brenner Pass.

== Background ==
Following the success of her 2010 film The Real M*A*S*H, which profiled some of the real-life staff of the 8055th Mobile Army Surgical Hospital which had inspired the popular M*A*S*H media franchise, History asked Lee to make a similar film exploring a real story with connections to Quentin Tarantino's recent hit film Inglourious Basterds. She had not seen the film, but after viewing it she identified the themes of resistance and fighting back as being what had most resonated with audiences, and found the story of Operation Greenup after some research.

The film featured interviews with both Mayer and Wijnberg; Weber had already died by that time, but some of his surviving relatives shared their knowledge of his experiences. The film also blended original newsreel footage from the war, and dramatic re-enactments of some events with the trio portrayed by actors Steve Shand as Mayer, Eric Markewich as Wijnberg and Sean Connolly Affleck as Weber.

== Distribution ==
The film premiered November 8, 2012 on History.

It was screened theatrically at the 2013 GI Film Festival, an American film festival devoted to military-themed films.

== Awards ==
The film won the Canadian Screen Award for Best History or Biography Documentary Program or Series at the 2nd Canadian Screen Awards in 2014. Lee also received a nomination for Best Direction in a Documentary Program, and Dave Kazala was nominated for Best Editing in a Documentary Program or Series.
