= Koh-e Keshni Khan =

Mountain in the Afghan Hindu Kush

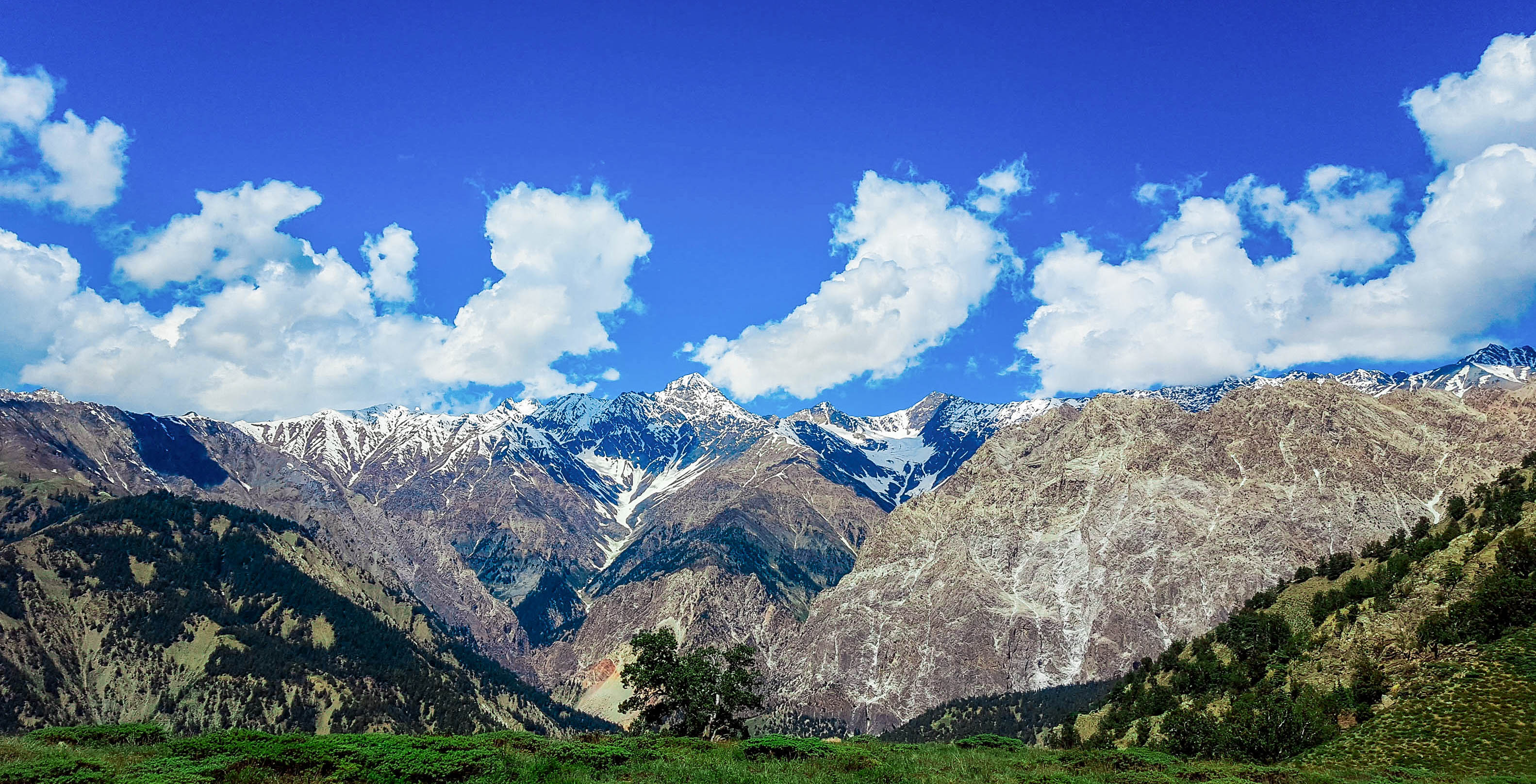
- The high Hindukush with conifer forests and sub-alpine moorlands

Highest point
- Elevation: 6,755 m (22,162 ft)
- Coordinates: 36°33′30″N 71°54′12″E

Geography
- Location within Afghanistan
- Location: Wakhan Corridor, Afghanistan
- Parent range: Hindu Kush

Koh-e Keshni Khan is a 6755-meter-high mountain in the eastern Hindukush range, Wakhan Corridor, Afghanistan. It is the 30th highest mountain in the country. It has a prominence of 292 metres (958 ft), which is extremely low given the altitude, but this is likely due to the fact that ridges surround the mountain. The mountain, along with all of the eastern Hindukush, is heavily glaciated starting from a very low altitude. The temperature tree line is at 10,800 feet (3,300 m). The nearest higher-elevation peak to the mountain is Kuh-e Keshni Khan, which is 2.1 kilometres (1.3 mi) away.

== Etymology ==
In Urdu, the mountain's name is "Koh Kishni Khan".

== Geography and climate ==
=== Geography ===
Koh-e Keshni Khan is surrounded by high ground, with no considerable-prominence peaks lower than 10,000 feet visible from the summit. Almost all of the surrounding terrain except the lowest valleys is snow-covered for a large part of the year. The mountain is within an extremely erratic-topographized area, much of which is a plateau.

=== Climate ===
The mountain, being in the east of its range, is at the extreme western limit of the Indian monsoon. Summer is from July to September, and the season is warm and rainy on the lower slopes and in the valleys. Higher up, it gets colder, and rain turns to sleet, which turns eventually to snow at the highest peak. Winters are dry and cold in the valleys, and extremely cold and snowy up on the glaciated mountainside.

After 10,800 feet, the area takes on a tundra climate (ET), grading to ice cap (EF) higher up.

=== Environment and flora ===
In the valleys at approximately 1,700 meters, wild olive is the dominant plant. The land has a BSk or Dwb climate, with vegetation adapted to dry, hot conditions. Later, after approximately 2,300 meters, conifer forest with pines and junipers prevails in a Dwc climate. Higher areas are tundra with scattered bushes, grading to grass on sub-alpine moorland, grading to steppe grass and lichen, grading to mossfields. The highest areas, above 4,900 metres (16,100 ft), do not have any vegetation, for they are glaciated. Juniper trees grow at up to the snowline, making them one of the highest-elevation trees (and associated tree lines) in the world.

=== Climate change ===
Glacier cover is not undergoing any significant change, but the tree line is getting higher, moving up from ~4100 meters (this is for the east Hindukush specifically, not the whole Himalayan range), into the subnival region (tundra) between 4,100–4,900 metres (13,500–16,100 ft), marked by the appearance of stunted trees (krummholz), bush and shrubland, and taller grass in places where there was once just plains of lichen and moss.

== See also ==
- Karakoram range
- 8,000-er
- Himalayas
- Badakhshan
- Pakistan
- Gilgit-Baltistan
