= Wladimir von Pawlowski =

Austrian politician (1891–1961)

Wladimir von Pawlowski (29 August 1891 – 1961) was an Austrian lawyer and Nazi politician, who served as Gauleiter (Party Leader) and Reichsstatthalter (Reich Governor) of Carinthia after Austria was annexed by Nazi Germany.

Pawlowski held these offices from 1 April 1940 to 27 November 1941. Before Anschluss, he sat in the Carinthia Landtag. He was also a member of the Schutzstaffel (SS) with an SS number of 292,801. On 21 June 1939, he was promoted to the rank of SS-Standartenführer.
