= Reichsgau Salzburg =

- Reichsgau of Nazi Germany
- 1938–1945
- Flag Coat of arms

- Map of Nazi Germany showing its administrative subdivisions (Gaue and Reichsgaue)
- Capital: Salzburg
- Population
  - 1939: 257,376
- Government
- Gauleiter
  - 1938–1941: Friedrich Rainer
  - 1941–1945: Gustav Adolf Scheel
- History
  - Anschluss: 12 March 1938
  - German surrender: 8 May 1945
| Preceded by | Succeeded by |
| Salzburg | Salzburg |
- Today part of: Austria

The Reichsgau Salzburg was an administrative division of Nazi Germany in Salzburg, Austria. It existed between 1938 and 1945.

== History ==
The Nazi Gau (plural Gaue) system was originally established in a party conference on 22 May 1926, in order to improve administration of the party structure. From 1933 onwards, after the Nazi seizure of power, the Gaue increasingly replaced the German states as administrative subdivisions in Germany. On 12 March 1938 Nazi Germany annexed Austria and on 24 May the Austrian provinces were reorganized and replaced by seven Nazi party Gaue. Under the Ostmarkgesetz law of 14 April 1939 with effect of 1 May, the Austrian Gaue were raised to the status of Reichsgaue and their Gauleiters were subsequently also named Reichsstatthalters.

At the head of each Gau stood a Gauleiter, a position which became increasingly more powerful, especially after the outbreak of the Second World War. Local Gauleiters were in charge of propaganda and surveillance and, from September 1944 onwards, the Volkssturm and the defence of the Gau.

The position of Gauleiter in Salzburg was initially held by Friedrich Rainer until 27 November 1941, and then by Gustav Adolf Scheel, while Anton Wintersteiger held the office of Deputy Gauleiter throughout the Reichsgau's history from 1938 to 1945.
