= Reichsgau Kärnten =

Administrative division of Nazi Germany

Reichsgau Carinthia
- Reichsgau of Nazi Germany
- 1938–1945
- Flag Coat of arms

- Map of Nazi Germany showing its administrative subdivisions (Gaue and Reichsgaue)
- Capital: Klagenfurt
- Population
  - 1939: 451,028
- Government
- Gauleiter
  - 1938–1939: Hubert Klausner
  - 1939–1941: Franz Kutschera (acting)
  - 1941–1945: Friedrich Rainer
- History
  - Anschluss: 12 March 1938
  - German surrender: 8 May 1945
Preceded by
Carinthia
Tyrol
Drava Banovina
Succeeded by
Carinthia
Tyrol
People's Republic of Slovenia
- Today part of: Austria; Slovenia

The Reichsgau Carinthia (German: Reichsgau Kärnten) was an administrative division of Nazi Germany in Carinthia and East Tyrol (both in Austria) and Upper Carniola in Slovenia. It existed from 1938 to 1945.

It was responsible for the administration of the de facto annexed Operational Zone of the Adriatic Littoral (Operationszone Adriatisches Küstenland, OZAK).

== History ==
The Nazi Gau (plural Gaue) system was originally established in a party conference on 22 May 1926, in order to improve administration of the party structure. From 1933 onwards, after the Nazi seizure of power, the Gaue increasingly replaced the German states as administrative subdivisions in Germany. On 12 March 1938 Nazi Germany annexed Austria and on 24 May the Austrian provinces were reorganized and replaced by seven Nazi party Gaue. Under the Ostmarkgesetz law of 14 April 1939 with effect of 1 May, the Austrian Gaue were raised to the status of Reichsgaue and their Gauleiters were subsequently also named Reichsstatthalters.

At the head of each Gau stood a Gauleiter, a position which became increasingly more powerful, especially after the outbreak of the Second World War. Local Gauleiters were in charge of propaganda and surveillance and, from September 1944 onwards, the Volkssturm and the defence of the Gau.

The position of Gauleiter in Carinthia initially was held by Hubert Klausner from 1938 to 1939. Franz Kutschera was acting Gauleiter from 1939 to 1941, followed by Friedrich Rainer from 1941 to 1945.
