= Reichsgau Tirol-Vorarlberg =

Administrative division of Nazi Germany

Reichsgau Tyrol-Vorarlberg
- Reichsgau of Nazi Germany
- 1938–1945
- Flag Coat of arms

- Map of Nazi Germany showing its administrative subdivisions (Gaue and Reichsgaue)
- Capital: Innsbruck
- Population
  - 1939: 330,892
- Government
- Gauleiter
  - 1938–1945: Franz Hofer
- History
  - Anschluss: 12 March 1938
  - German surrender: 8 May 1945
Preceded by	Succeeded by
Tyrol; Vorarlberg	Tyrol; Vorarlberg
- Today part of: Austria

The Reichsgau Tyrol-Vorarlberg (German: Reichsgau Tirol-Vorarlberg) was an administrative division of Nazi Germany consisting of Vorarlberg and North Tyrol (both in Austria). It existed from 1938 to 1945. It did not include East Tyrol (Lienz), which was instead part of Reichsgau Carinthia.

After the Italian Armistice with the Allies the Italian provinces of Belluno, South Tyrol and Trentino were placed under direct German control as the Operational Zone of the Alpine Foothills (Operationszone Alpenvorland, OZAV), which was de facto annexed and administered as part of Tyrol-Vorarlberg.

== History ==
The Nazi Gau (plural Gaue) system was originally established in a party conference on 22 May 1926, in order to improve administration of the party structure. From 1933 onwards, after the Nazi seizure of power, the Gaue increasingly replaced the German states as administrative subdivisions in Germany. On 12 March 1938 Nazi Germany annexed Austria and on 24 May the Austrian provinces were reorganized and replaced by seven Nazi party Gaue. Under the Ostmarkgesetz law of 14 April 1939 with effect of 1 May, the Austrian Gaue were raised to the status of Reichsgaue and their Gauleiters were subsequently also named Reichsstatthalters.

At the head of each Gau stood a Gauleiter, a position which became increasingly more powerful, especially after the outbreak of the Second World War. Local Gauleiters were in charge of propaganda and surveillance and, from September 1944 onwards, the Volkssturm and the defence of the Gau.

The position of Gauleiter in Tyrol-Vorarlberg was held by Franz Hofer throughout the Reichsgau's history from 1938 to 1945.

At the end of the Second World War, Tyrol-Vorarlberg became the French occupation zone in Austria.
