= Territorial evolution of Germany =

Germany, 1871–1914

The territorial evolution of Germany in this article includes all changes in the modern territory of Germany from its unification making it a country on 1 January 1871 to the present, although the history of both the German state as a territorial polity concept and the history of the ethnic Germans are much longer and much more complex. Modern Germany was formed when the Kingdom of Prussia unified most of the German states, with the exception of multi-ethnic Austria (which was ruled by the German-speaking royal family of Habsburg and had significant German-speaking land), into the German Empire. As a result of its loss in the First World War, the 1919 Treaty of Versailles stipulated that Germany cede about 13% of its territory to its neighbours; its colonies were lost at the same time. The Weimar Republic was formed two days before the end of fighting in WWI. This republic included territories to the east of today's German borders.

The period of Nazi rule from the early 1930s through the end of the Second World War brought significant territorial losses for the country. Nazi Germany initially expanded the country's territory dramatically and conquered most of Europe, though not all areas were added to Germany officially. However, the Nazi plan for the near future was the establishment of a Greater Germanic Reich including most of Europe. The Nazi regime eventually collapsed, and the four Allies occupied Germany.

Nazi annexations from the time of its annexation of Austria on 13 March 1938 were annulled while the former eastern territories of Germany before Nazi annexation of Austria were ceded to Poland and the Soviet Union and the Oder and Neisse Rivers became Germany's new eastern boundary. This territory became Poland's so-called "Recovered Territories", while approximately one-third of East Prussia became the Russian Federation's Kaliningrad Oblast. In the west, the Saar area (Saarland) formed one French-controlled protectorate with its own high autonomy.

The western part of Germany was unified as the Trizone, becoming the Federal Republic of Germany on 23 May 1949 ("West Germany"). Western-occupied West Berlin declared its accession to the Federal Republic of Germany in 1949 but was denied by the occupying powers. The Soviet zone of Germany in the east, including the Soviet sector of Berlin, became the communist German Democratic Republic ("East Germany") on 7 October of the same year. On 1 January 1957, the Saar Protectorate (which was separated from Germany on 17 December 1947) became a part the Federal Republic of Germany, as provided by its Grundgesetz (constitution) article no. 23 ("Little reunification"). East Germany, including East Berlin, became parts the Federal Republic of Germany on 3 October 1990 – an event referred to as German reunification.

== Background ==
=== German settlement in Central and Eastern Europe ===
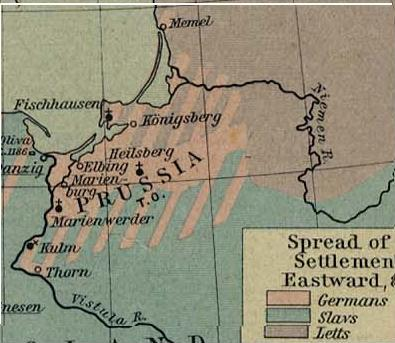
Following the conquest of Prussia by the Teutonic knights in the Prussian Crusade, German settlers were brought in, displacing the indigenous Old Prussians.

Part of the motivation behind the territorial changes is based on historical events in the Eastern and Central Europe. Migrations to the East that took place over more than a millennium led to pockets of Germans living throughout Central and Eastern Europe as far east as Russia. The existence of these enclaves was sometimes used by German nationalists, such as the Nazis, to justify territorial claims.

=== The rise of European nationalism ===
The territorial changes of Germany after World War II can be interpreted in the context of the evolution of global nationalism and European nationalism.

The latter half of the 19th century and the first half of the 20th century saw the rise of nationalism in Europe. Previously, a country consisted largely of whatever peoples lived on the land that was under the dominion of a particular ruler. As principalities and kingdoms grew through conquest and marriage, a ruler could wind up with many different ethnicities under his dominion.

The concept of nationalism was based on the idea of a "people" who shared a common bond through race, religion, language and culture. Furthermore, nationalism asserted that each "people" had a right to its own state. Thus, much of European history in the latter half of the 19th century and the first half of the 20th century can be understood as efforts to realign national boundaries with this concept of "one people, one state". Many interior conflicts were a result of more or less pressurising citizens of alternative ethnicities and/or other native languages to assimilate to the ethnicity dominant in the state. Switzerland was the exception, lacking a common native language.

Much conflict would arise when one nation asserted territorial rights to land outside its borders on the basis of an ethnic bond with the people living on the land. Another source of conflict arose when a group of people who constituted a minority in one nation would seek to secede from the nation either to form an independent nation or join another nation with whom they felt stronger ties. Yet another source of conflict was the desire of some nations to expel people from territory within its borders because people did not share a common bond with the majority of people of that nation.

== History ==
=== Formation of the German Empire ===
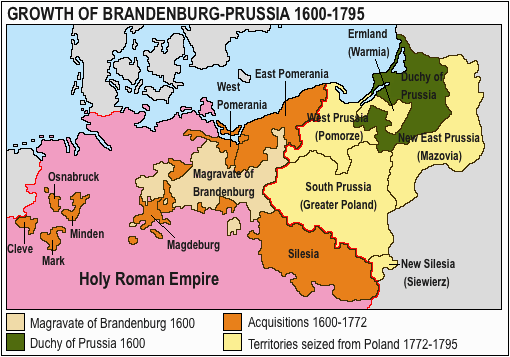
Growth of Brandenburg-Prussia. During the Partitions of Poland between 1772 and 1795, Prussia annexed large swaths of the Polish–Lithuanian Commonwealth.

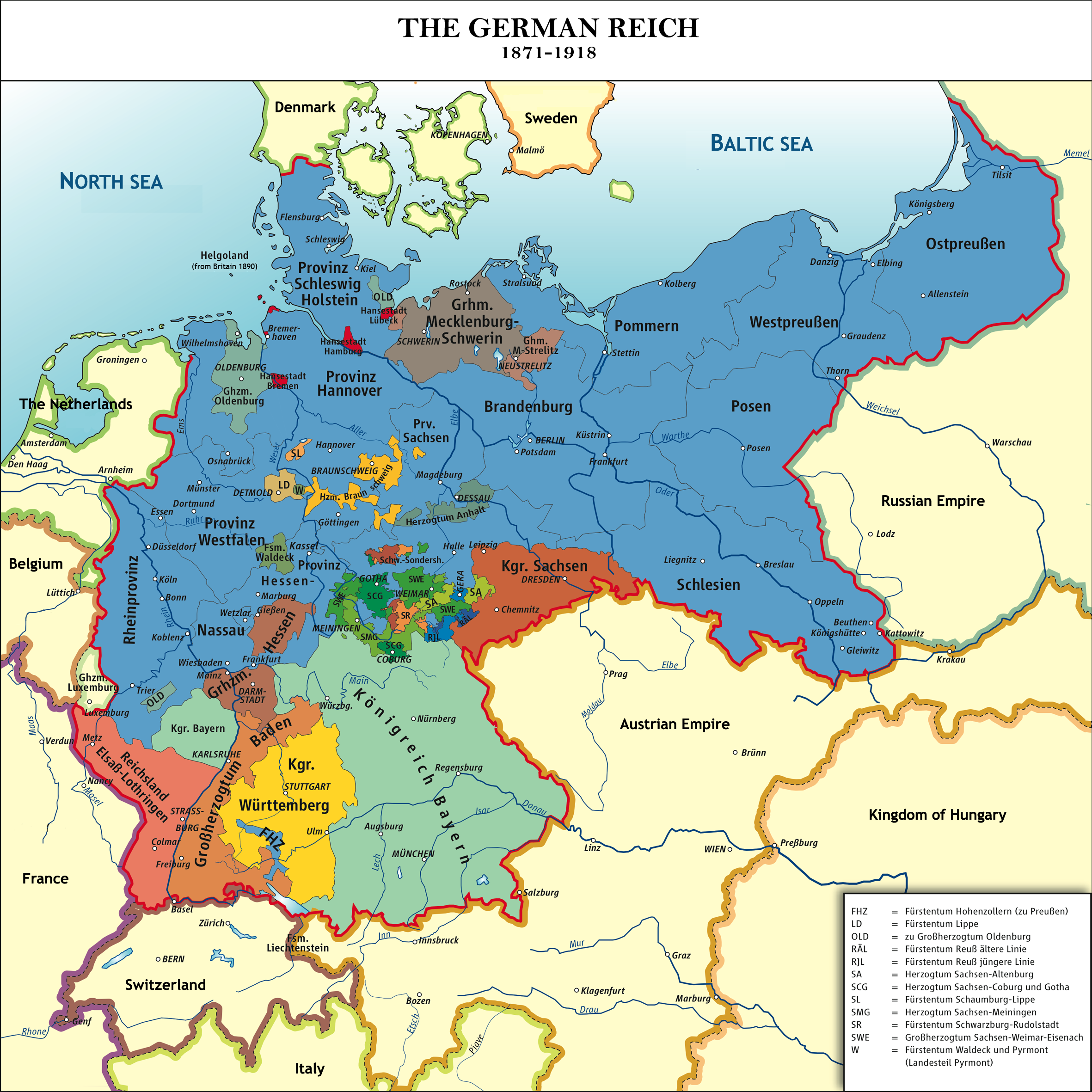
States of the German Empire 1871–1918 (Prussia shown in blue)

==== Prussia ====
In 1701, the Kingdom of Prussia was established, which then expanded at the expense of the weakening neighboring powers. During the Great Northern War, in 1720, Prussia took a part of Swedish Pomerania with the city of Szczecin from Sweden. During the Silesian Wars, Prussia annexed the bulk of Silesia from the Habsburg monarchy in 1742. During the Partitions of Poland between 1772 and 1795, Prussia seized 141,400 square kilometres (54,600 sq mi) of the Polish–Lithuanian Commonwealth's western territory, including the regions of Greater Poland, Gdańsk Pomerania, Kuyavia, Warmia, northern and western Mazovia, and the Duchy of Siewierz, including the Polish capital of Warsaw. Subsequently, renaming them as South Prussia, West Prussia, New East Prussia and New Silesia. After the annexation of the Polish territories, Frederick the Great immediately sent 57,475 German families to the newly conquered lands in order to solidify his new acquisitions, and abolished the use of the Polish language. During the Napoleonic Wars, Prussia lost control of parts of the annexed Polish territories, which became the short-lived Polish Duchy of Warsaw in 1807.

Following the Napoleonic Wars, Prussia annexed several territories per the Congress of Vienna, that is Rhineland and Saarlouis from France, the western part of the just dissolved Duchy of Warsaw with the Chełmno Land and most of Greater Poland and Kuyavia, Lower Lusatia from Saxony, and the remainder of Swedish Pomerania with Stralsund from Sweden.

==== North German Confederation ====
The Prussian-led North German Confederation, founded in 1866, was combined with the southern states of Baden, Württemberg, Bavaria and Hesse and the formerly French newly merged Alsace–Lorraine to form the states and imperial territory of German Empire in 1871. In some areas of Prussia's eastern provinces, such as the Province of Posen, the majority of the population was Polish. Many Lorrainians were by native language French. Many Alsatians and Lorrainians of German language clung to France (see Député protestataire), despite their native languages.

==== Heligoland ====
Britain ceded Heligoland to Germany in 1890 in accordance with the terms of the Heligoland–Zanzibar Treaty. The Heligolanders, then still prevailingly fluent in their Heligolandic dialect of North Frisian, adopted German citizenship, like many other Frisians of Germany along the North Sea coast.

=== World War I ===
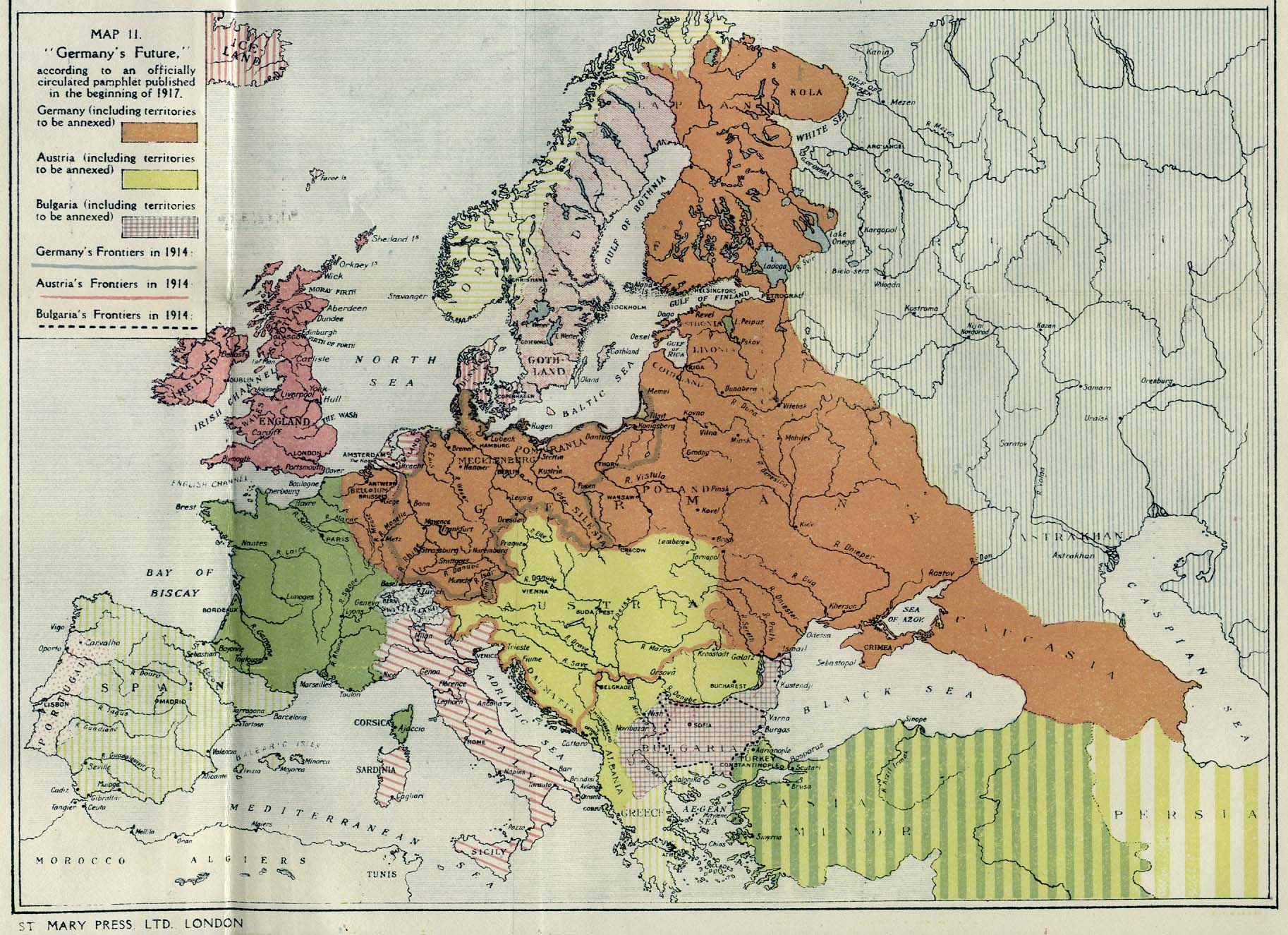
World War I Allied propaganda poster showing German expansionist ambitions

The only territory that Germany annexed during the First World War was the German-Belgian condominium Neutral Moresnet. Since 1914, Germany occupied the territory, and on 27 June 1915, it was annexed as part of Prussia. The annexation never received international recognition (is not known whether the other Central Powers recognized the annexation).

==== Brest-Litovsk ====
As part of the Treaty of Brest-Litovsk, Russia's new Bolshevik (communist) government renounced all claims to Finland, Estonia, Latvia, Lithuania, Poland, Belarus, and Ukraine.

Most of these territories were in effect ceded to the German Empire, intended to become economically dependent on and politically closely tied to that empire under different German kings and dukes.

Regarding the ceded territories, the treaty stated that "Germany and Austria-Hungary intend to determine the future fate of these territories in agreement with their population" with few other effects than the appointment of German rulers to the new thrones of Finland, Latvia, Lithuania, and Poland.

=== Territorial changes after World War I ===
==== Treaty of Versailles ====
Germany after Versailles Administered by the League of Nations Annexed or transferred to neighbouring countries by the treaty, or later via plebiscite and League of Nations action Weimar Germany

The provisions of the Treaty of Versailles at the end of World War I obliged Germany to cede some territory to other countries. Besides the loss of the German colonial empire, the territories Germany lost were:

- Alsace–Lorraine, which became a part of the German Empire following the Treaty of Frankfurt on 10 May 1871, returned to French sovereignty without a plebiscite as a precondition to armistice (i.e. and therefore not as a clause of the Treaty of Versailles) with effect from the date of the armistice (11 November 1918), (14,522 km^{2} or 5,607 sq mi, 1,815,000 inhabitants (1905)).
- Northern Schleswig (including the German-dominated towns of Tondern, Apenrade, and Sonderburg) was given to Denmark after the Schleswig Plebiscite (3,984 km^{2} or 1,538 sq mi, 163,600 inhabitants (1920)).
- Most of the Prussian provinces of Posen and West Prussia, which Prussia had annexed during the Partitions of Poland (1772–1795), were restored to the reborn country of Poland. Most of this territory had already been liberated by the local Polish population during the Greater Poland Uprising of 1918–1919 (53,800 km^{2} or 20,800 sq mi, 4,224,000 inhabitants (1931), including 510 km^{2} or 200 sq mi and 26,000 inhabitants from Upper Silesia). The remaining areas of both provinces were combined to become the new Prussian province of Grenzmark Posen-West Prussia. A sizeable German population still remained in the areas ceded to Poland, however.
- The Hlučín Region of Upper Silesia to Czechoslovakia (316 or 333 km², 49,000 inhabitants).
- East Upper Silesia to Poland (3,214 km^{2} or 1,241 sq mi out of 10,950 km^{2} or 4,230 sq mi – around 30% with 965,000 inhabitants), after the Upper Silesia plebiscite in which 60% had voted in favor of remaining German and 40% wanted all of Upper Silesia to become Polish. The vote was designed to provide guidance on how to divide the area, and most of the areas voting for Poland were separated from Germany.
- The area of Eupen-Malmedy to Belgium, along with the Vennbahn railway line (which created six German enclaves within Belgian territory).
- The northern part of East Prussia as Memelland under the control of France, Italy, Japan, and the United Kingdom, later transferred to Lithuania without a vote.
- The area of Działdowo (a railway station on the Warsaw-Danzig route) in East Prussia to Poland (492 km^{2} or 190 sq mi).
- An area from the eastern part of West Prussia and the southern part of East Prussia Warmia and Masuria, to Poland (see East Prussian plebiscite); the majority of the Slavic Masurians voted to remain part of Germany.
- The Saar area was to be under the control of the League of Nations for 15 years, after which a vote between France and Germany would be held to decide which country it would belong to. During this time, the region's coal was given to France.
- The port of Danzig (now Gdańsk, Poland) along the delta of the Vistula became the Free City of Danzig under the League of Nations. (1,893 km^{2} or 731 sq mi, 408,000 inhabitants (1929)), 90% Germans.

In Article 80 of the Treaty of Versailles, Germany acknowledged and promised to respect the independence of Austria.

==== Sudetenland ====
The Sudeten Germans had attempted to prevent the German language border areas of former Austria-Hungary from becoming part of Czechoslovakia in 1918. Once part of Bohemia, they had proclaimed the German-Austrian province of Sudetenland in October 1918, voting instead to join the newly declared Republic of German Austria in November 1918. However, this had been forbidden by the victorious allied powers of the First World War (the Treaty of Saint-Germain) and by the Czechoslovak government, partly with force of arms in 1919. Many Sudeten Germans rejected an affiliation to Czechoslovakia, since they had been refused the right to self-determination promised by US president Woodrow Wilson in his Fourteen Points of January 1918.

==== Silesian uprisings ====
The Silesian Uprisings (Polish: Powstania śląskie) were a series of three armed uprisings (1919–1921) of Poles in the Upper Silesia region against Weimar Republic in order to separate the region (where in some parts Poles constituted a majority) from Germany and join it with the Second Polish Republic.

=== Interbellum ===
==== Territorial claims of German nationalists ====
By World War I, there were isolated groups of Germans or so-called Schwaben as far southeast as the Bosphorus (Turkey), Georgia, and Azerbaijan. After the war, Germany's and Austria-Hungary's loss of territory and the rise of communism in the Soviet Union meant that more Germans than ever constituted sizable minorities in various countries.

German nationalists used the existence of large German minorities in other countries as a basis for territorial claims. Many of the propaganda themes of the Nazi regime against Czechoslovakia and Poland claimed that the ethnic Germans (Volksdeutsche) in those territories were persecuted.

The Nazis negotiated a number of population transfers with Joseph Stalin and others with Benito Mussolini so that both Germany and the other country would increase their ethnic homogeneity. However, these population transfers were not sufficient to appease the demands of the Nazis. The Heim ins Reich rhetoric of the Nazis over the continued disjoint status of enclaves such as Danzig and East Prussia was an agitating factor in the politics leading up to World War II, and is considered by many to be among the major causes of Nazi aggressiveness and thus the war. Adolf Hitler used these issues as a pretext for waging wars of aggression against Czechoslovakia and Poland.

==== Rhineland ====
On 7 March 1936, Hitler sent a small expeditionary force into the demilitarized Rhineland. This was a clear violation of the 1919 Treaty of Versailles which officially ended World War I. France and Britain were within their rights, via the Treaty, to oust the German forces. British public opinion blocked any use of military force, thus preventing French action, as they were internally divided and would not act without British support.

==== Saar region ====
In 1933, a considerable number of anti-Nazi Germans fled to the Saar, as it was the only part of Germany left outside the Third Reich's control. As a result, anti-Nazi groups campaigned heavily for the Saarland to remain under control of League of Nations as long as Adolf Hitler ruled Germany. However, long-held sentiments against France remained entrenched, with very few sympathizing openly with France. When the 15-year-term was over, a plebiscite was held in the territory on 13 January 1935: 90.3% of those voting wished to join Germany.

On 17 January 1935, the territory's re-union with Germany was approved by the League Council. On 1 March, Nazi Germany took over the region and appointed Josef Bürckel as Reichskommissar für die Rückgliederung des Saarlandes, "Realm Commissioner for the re-union of Saarland".

As the new Gau was extended to the Rhine, including the historic Palatinate, the region's name was changed again on 8 April 1940 to Gau Saarpfalz (Saar-Palatinate). After the Battle of France, the French département of Moselle was incorporated in the Reichsgau.

==== Anschluss ====
The Allies were, on paper, committed to upholding the terms of the Treaty of Versailles, which specifically prohibited the union of Germany and post-war Austria (a German-speaking country). This notwithstanding, the Anschluss was among the first major steps in the Austrian-born Adolf Hitler's long-desired creation of an empire including German-speaking lands and territories Germany had lost after World War I.

The events of 12 March 1938, marked the culmination of historical cross-national pressures to unify the German populations of Austria and Germany under one nation. However, the 1938 Anschluss, regardless of its popularity, was enacted by Germany. Earlier, Hitler's Germany had provided support for the Austrian National Socialist Party (Austrian Nazi Party) in its bid to seize power from Austria's Austrofascist leadership. Fully devoted to remaining independent but amidst growing pressures, the chancellor of Austria, Kurt Schuschnigg, tried to hold a plebiscite.

Although Schuschnigg expected Austria to vote in favour of maintaining autonomy, a well-planned coup d'état by the Austrian Nazi Party of Austria's state institutions in Vienna took place on 11 March, prior to the vote. With power quickly transferred over to Germany, the Wehrmacht troops entered Austria to enforce the Anschluss. The Nazis held a plebiscite within the following month, where they received 99.73% of the vote. No fighting ever took place and the strongest voices against the annexation, particularly Fascist Italy, France and the United Kingdom (parties to the Stresa Front), were powerless or, in the case of Italy, appeased.

==== Czechoslovakia ====
The partition of Czechoslovakia from 1938 through 1939. German gains in purple (dark: Sudetenland, light: Protectorate of Bohemia and Moravia).

===== Sudetenland =====
On 29 September 1938, Adolf Hitler, Neville Chamberlain, Benito Mussolini and Édouard Daladier signed the Munich Agreement. The Czechoslovak government capitulated on 30 September and reluctantly agreed to abide by the agreement. The settlement gave Germany the Sudetenland starting 10 October, and de facto control over the rest of Czechoslovakia as long as Hitler promised to go no further.

Hitler and Chamberlain signed an additional resolution determining to resolve all future disputes between Germany and the United Kingdom through peaceful means. This is often confused with the Four-Power Munich Agreement itself, not least because most photographs of Chamberlain's return show him waving the paper containing the resolution, not the Munich Agreement itself.

Without fortification which was built in Sudetenland, Czechoslovakia was now defenseless. On 5 October, Edvard Beneš resigned as President of Czechoslovakia, realising that the fall of Czechoslovakia was fait accompli. Following the outbreak of World War II, he would form a Czechoslovak government-in-exile in London.

===== Invasion of the rest of Czechoslovakia =====
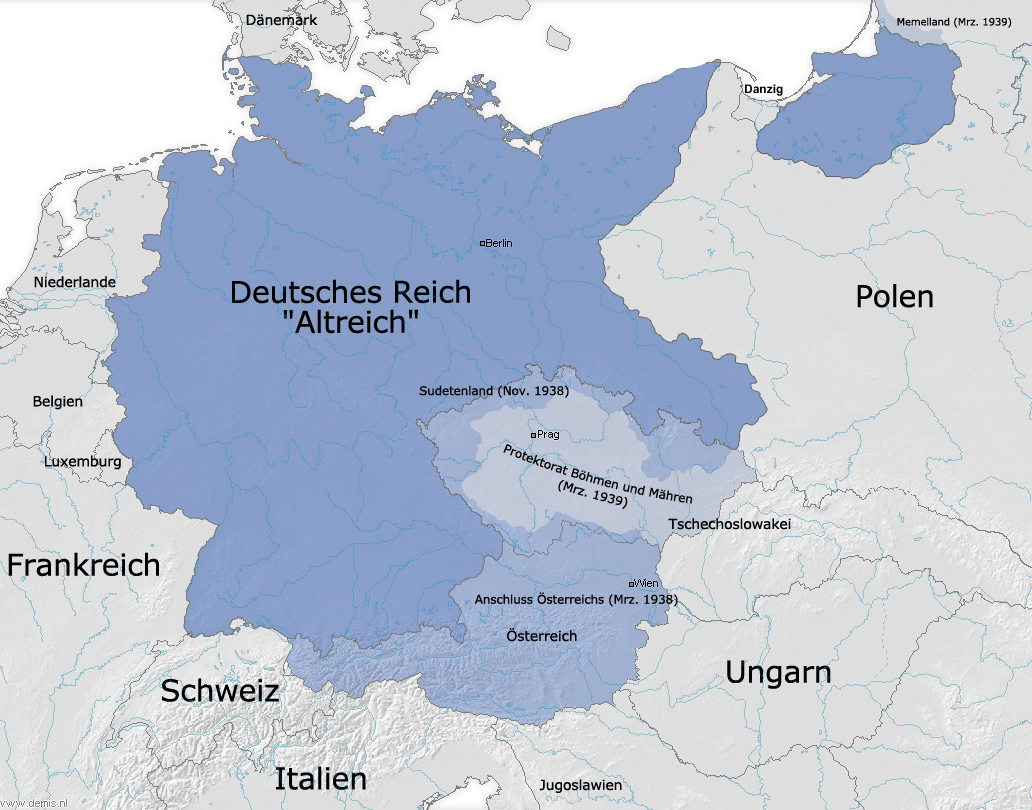
Germany in 1939 before the start of World War II

On 13 March 1939, Nazi armies entered Prague and proceeded to occupy the remainder of Bohemia and Moravia, which was transformed into a protectorate of the Reich. The eastern half of the country, Slovakia, became a separate pro-Nazi state, the Slovak Republic.

Prime Minister Chamberlain felt betrayed by the Nazi seizure of Czechoslovakia, realising his policy of appeasement towards Hitler had failed, and immediately began to mobilize the British Empire's armed forces on a war footing. France did the same. Though no immediate action followed, Hitler's move on Poland in September started World War II in Europe.

==== Memel Territory ====
By late 1938, Lithuania had lost control over the situation in the Klaipėda Region. In the early hours of 23 March 1939, after a political ultimatum had made a Lithuanian delegation travel to Berlin, the Lithuanian Minister of Foreign Affairs Juozas Urbšys and his German counterpart Joachim von Ribbentrop signed the Treaty of the Cession of the Memel Territory to Germany in exchange for a Lithuanian Free Zone in the port of Memel, using the facilities erected in previous years.

=== World War II ===
The Third Reich at its greatest extent (dark blue), 1942

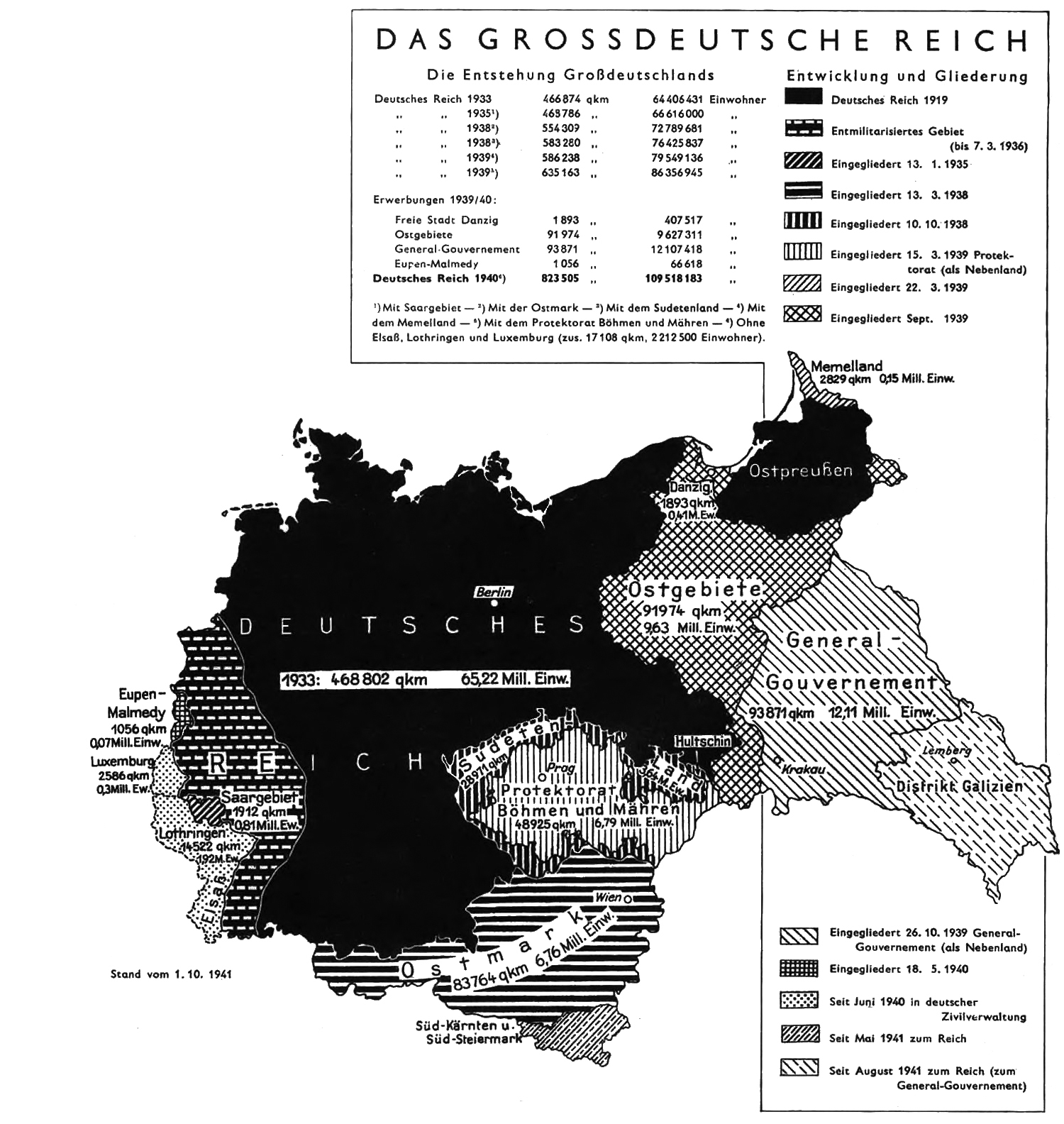
Territorial expansion of Germany proper from 1933 to 1941 as explained to Wehrmacht soldiers, a Nazi era map in German

==== Poland ====
After invading Poland in 1939, Germany annexed the lands it was forced to give to a reformed Poland in 1919–1922 by the Treaty of Versailles, including the Polish Corridor, the former Province of Posen, and East Upper Silesia. The Volkstag of the Free City of Danzig voted to become a part of Germany again, although Poles and Jews were deprived of their voting rights and all non-Nazi political parties were banned. Parts of Poland that had not been part of Wilhelmine Germany were also incorporated into the Reich.

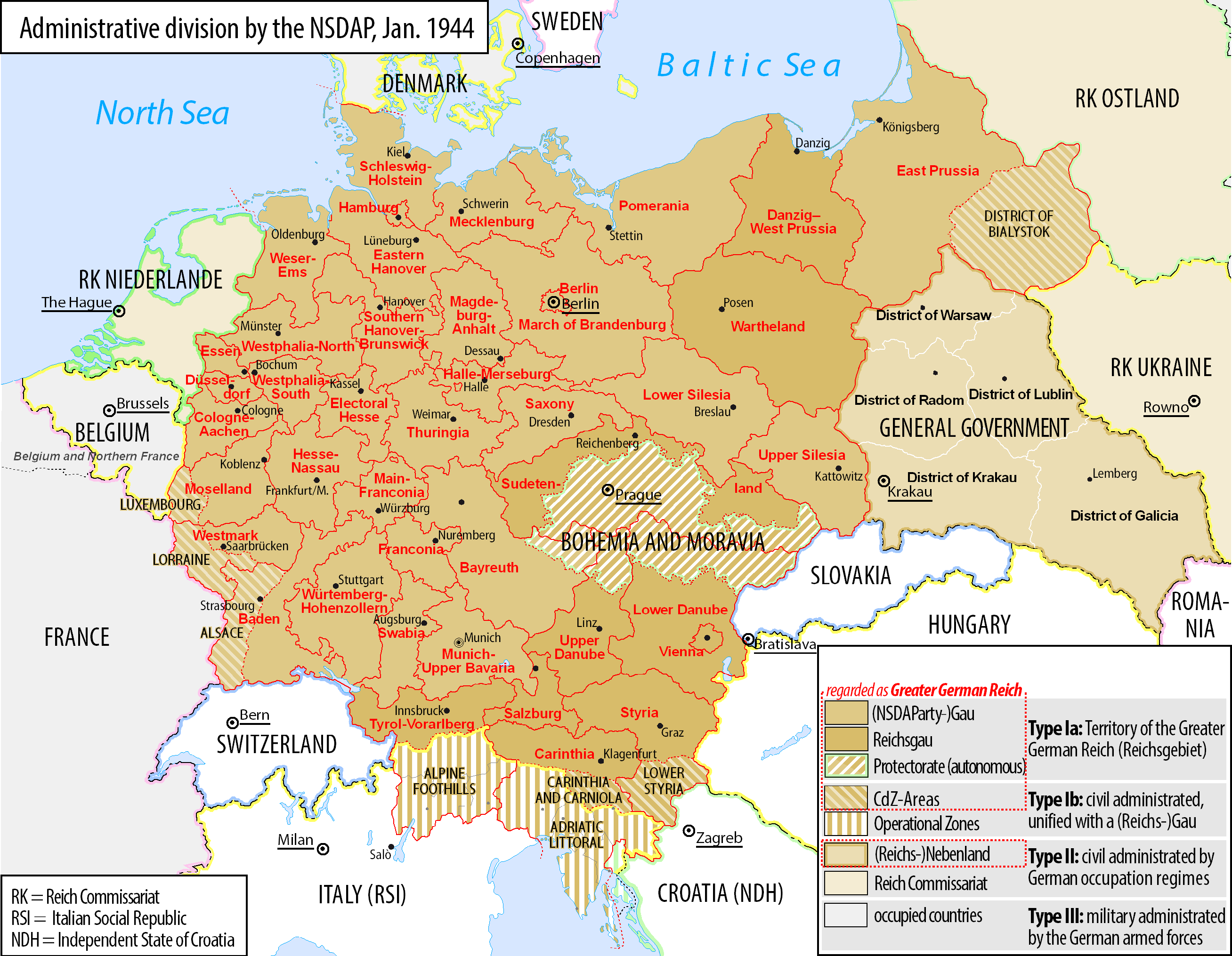
Map of NS administrative division in 1944

Two decrees by Adolf Hitler (8 October and 12 October 1939) provided for the division of the annexed areas of Poland into the following administrative units:

- Reichsgau Wartheland (initially Reichsgau Posen), which included the entire Poznań Voivodeship, most of the Łódź Voivodeship, five counties of the Pomeranian Voivodeship, and the Działdowo County of the Warsaw Voivodeship;
- Reichsgau Danzig-West Prussia (initially Reichsgau West Prussia), which consisted of the remaining area of the Pomeranian Voivodeship and the Free City of Danzig;
- Ciechanów District (Regierungsbezirk Zichenau), consisting of the five northern counties of Warsaw Voivodeship (Płock, Płońsk, Sierpc, Ciechanów, and Mława), which became a part of East Prussia;
- Katowice District (Regierungsbezirk Kattowitz), or unofficially East Upper Silesia (Ost-Oberschlesien), which included Sosnowiec, Będzin, Chrzanów, and Zawiercie Counties, and parts of Olkusz and Żywiec Counties.

These territories had an area of 94,000 km^{2} (36,000 sq mi) and a population of 10,000,000 people. The remainder of the Polish territory was annexed by the Soviet Union (c. 52%; see Molotov–Ribbentrop Pact) or made into the German-controlled General Government occupation zone.

After the German attack on the Soviet Union in June 1941, the Białystok Voivodeship, which included the Białystok, Bielsk Podlaski, Grajewo, Łomża, Sokółka, Volkovysk, and Grodno Counties, was "attached to" (not incorporated into) East Prussia, while East Galicia was added to the General Government.

==== Alsace-Lorraine ====
After the invasion of France in 1940, Germany annexed the départements of Bas-Rhin, Haut-Rhin, and Moselle (Alsace-Lorraine). The German government never negotiated or declared a formal annexation, however, in order to preserve the possibility of an agreement with the West.

==== Eupen and Malmedy ====
See Eupen-Malmedy

==== Luxembourg ====
Luxembourg was invaded and occupied by German Forces on 10 May 1940 and placed under a "Chief of Civil Administration" (CdZ), like Alsace and Lorraine. These regions were annexed de facto and treated as an integral part of the Reich, without any formal declaration under international law.

==== Parts of Yugoslavia ====
From: History of Slovenia "After Yugoslavia fell, Germany, Italy, and Hungary each annexed parts of Slovenia, the largest part being Lower Styria which was annexed to the "Ostmark" (Nazi German Austria)."

==== South Tyrol ====
South Tyrol was de facto annexed by Nazi Germany; it was part of the Italian Social Republic, a German puppet state at the time.

==== Recognition ====
The fact there were the areas that had been incorporated into Nazi Germany since the Anschluss were repudiated in the Berlin Declaration of 5 June 1945 by the four victorious Allies who also officially abolished Nazi Germany and started to represent post-war Germany with the Declaration, new Nazi areas since the Anschluss were already considered the "annexations" by the Allies before in the war and were therefore non-issues in the post-war Germany.

=== Territorial changes after the German defeat in World War II ===
With the Allied Berlin Declaration of 5 June 1945 and Potsdam Agreement of 2 August 1945, German annexations which began with the German annexation of Austria were annulled and Germany also lost the traditionally ethnic German eastern region prior to the German annexation of Austria. Saarland separated from Allied occupied Germany to become a country under French protection on 17 December 1947, in 1949 the Federal Republic of Germany (FRG) and later the German Democratic Republic (GDR) were born, leading to Germany being split into two countries; present-day German territories were formed when the Saarland became part of the FRG on 1 January 1957 and the territories of the GDR became part of the FRG on 3 October 1990 (German borders also had other changes but tiny).

Allied occupation zones in Germany, 17 December 1947

As it became evident that the Allies were going to defeat Nazi Germany decisively, the question arose as to how to redraw the borders of Central and Eastern European countries after the war. In the context of those decisions, the problem arose of what to do about ethnic minorities within the redrawn borders. The territorial changes at the end of World War II were part of negotiated agreements between the victorious Allies to redraw national borders and arrange for deportation of all Germans that were east of the Oder–Neisse line. The Allies occupied Germany, but the Western allies and Soviet Union formed separate governments covering specific parts of Germany (West Germany and East Germany). The two Germanies reunified in 1990.

==== The Yalta Conference ====
The final decision to move Poland's boundary westward was made by the US, Britain and the Soviets at the Yalta Conference, shortly before the end of the war. The precise location of the border was left open; the western Allies also accepted in general the principle of the Oder River as the future western border of Poland and of population transfer as the way to prevent future border disputes. The open question was whether the border should follow the eastern or western Neisse rivers, and whether Stettin, the traditional seaport of Berlin, should remain German or be included in Poland.

Originally, Germany was to retain Stettin while the Poles were to annex East Prussia with Königsberg. Eventually, however, Stalin decided that he wanted Königsberg as a year-round warm water port for the Soviet Navy and argued that the Poles should receive Stettin instead. The wartime Polish government-in-exile had little to say in these decisions.

Key points of the meeting that are relevant to the territorial changes of Germany are as follows:

- There was an agreement that the priority would be the unconditional surrender of Nazi Germany. After the war, Germany would be split into four occupied zones, with a quadripartite occupation of Berlin as well, prior to unification of Germany.
- Stalin agreed to let France have the fourth occupation zone in Germany and Austria, carved out from the British and American zones. France would also be granted a seat in the Allied Control Council.
- Germany would undergo demilitarization and denazification.
- The status of Poland was discussed, but was complicated by the fact that Poland was at this time under the control of the Red Army. It was agreed to reorganize the Provisionary Polish Government that had been set up by the Red Army through the inclusion of other groups such as the Polish Provisional Government of National Unity and to have democratic elections. This effectively excluded the Polish government-in-exile that had evacuated in 1939.
- The Polish eastern border would follow the Curzon Line, and Poland would receive substantial territorial compensation in the west from Germany, although the exact border was to be determined at a later time.
- A "Committee on Dismemberment of Germany" was to be set up. The purpose was to decide whether Germany was to be divided into several nations, and if so, what borders and inter-relationships the new German states were to have.

==== The Potsdam Conference ====
At the Potsdam Conference the United States, the United Kingdom, and the Soviet Union placed the German territories within the 1937 Nazi Germany borders east of the Oder–Neisse line (before Austria became part of Nazi Germany ie an "annexation" on 13 March 1938) like in the Berlin Declaration of 5 June 1945 officially abolishing Nazi Germany before, and with the exception of parts of East Prussia, as formally under Polish administrative control. These were referred to by the Polish communist government as the "Western Territories" or "Regained Territories", as all these territories were under Polish rule in the past. It was anticipated that a final peace treaty would follow shortly and either confirm this border or determine whatever alterations might be agreed upon. Northern East Prussia and Memelland were placed under Soviet administrative control. The 1919 Versailles Treaty created Free City of Danzig was also placed under Polish administration. The German population east of the Oder–Neisse line disappeared from their traditional territories when they fled due to war then they were forcibly expelled.

At the end of the conference, the Three Heads of Government agreed on the following actions:

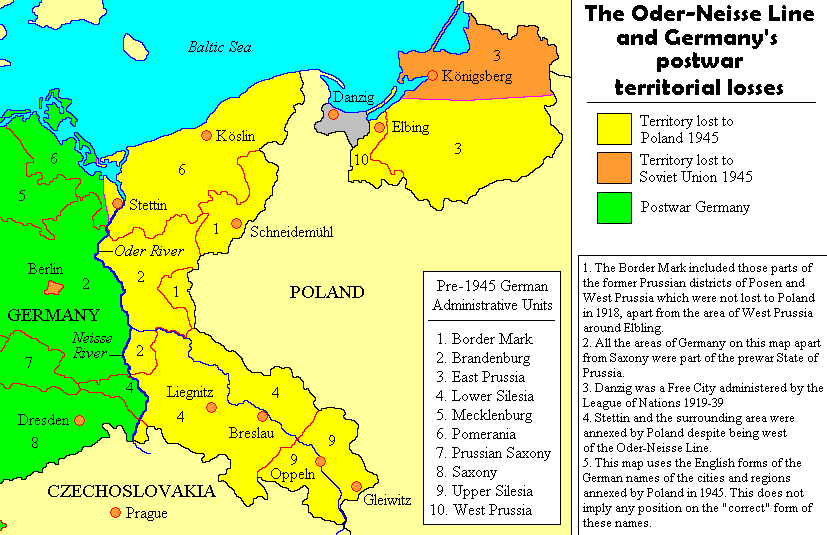
The Oder–Neisse line

- Issuance of a statement of aims of the occupation of Germany by the Allies: demilitarization, denazification, democratization and decartelization. (see also: The industrial plans for Germany)
- Division of Germany and Austria respectively into four occupation zones (earlier agreed in principle at Yalta), and the similar division of each's capital, Berlin and Vienna, into four and five sectors (one quadripartite sector), respectively.
- Reversion of all German annexations in Europe after 1937, among these were Sudetenland, Alsace-Lorraine, Austria, the westmost parts of Poland, and others.
- Germany's eastern border was to be shifted westwards to the Oder–Neisse line, effectively reducing Germany in size by approximately 25% compared to its 1937 borders. The territories east of the new border comprised East Prussia, all of Silesia (except for its westernmost part around the city of Görlitz), the eastern part of Brandenburg, and most of Pomerania (including former Grenzmark Posen-West Prussia). These areas included large urban centres such as Stettin (Szczecin), Breslau (Wrocław), Landsberg an der Warthe (Gorzów Wielkopolski) and so on.
- Expulsion of the German populations remaining beyond the new eastern borders of Germany, and ethnically German denaturalised citizens of other states such Czechoslovakia, Hungary, Poland, Romania, and Yugoslavia. France, which had not participated in the Potsdam conference, took its liberties to dismiss this point and therefore refused to absorb any expellees in its zone of occupation.

===== Finalization of the Polish-German border =====
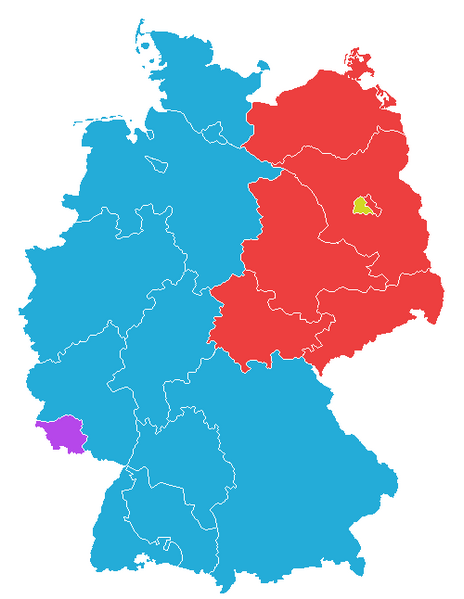
Federal Republic of Germany (blue and yellow), German Democratic Republic (red), and the Saarland (purple), 7 October 1949

The problem with the status of these territories was that the concluding document of the Potsdam Conference in 1945 was not a legally binding treaty, but a memorandum between the USSR, the US and the UK. It regulated the issue of the eastern German border, which was to be the Oder–Neisse line, but the final article of the memorandum said that the final decisions concerning Germany were to be subject to a separate peace treaty.

Based upon this interpretation of the Potsdam Agreement, the CDU controlled German government maintained that the Oder–Neisse line was completely unacceptable and subject to negotiation. Also the Social Democrats of the SPD initially refused to accept the Oder–Neisse line. Thus, the official German government position on the status of areas vacated by settled German communities east of the Oder–Neisse rivers was that the areas were "temporarily under Polish (or [Soviet]) administration."

Between 1970 and 1990, the West German political establishment gradually recognised the "facts on the ground" and accepted clauses in the Treaty on the Final Settlement, whereby Germany renounced all claims to territory east of the Oder–Neisse line. In the Treaty of Warsaw (1970; ratified in 1972) West Germany recognized the Oder–Neisse line as Poland's western border and renounced any present and future territorial claims; this was reaffirmed by both German states in the 1990 Treaty on the Final Settlement with Respect to Germany as a pre-condition for re-union. The treaty was ratified in 1991 by the united Germany. United Germany and Poland then finally settled the issue of the Oder–Neisse border by the German–Polish Border Treaty in November 1990. This ended the legal limbo which meant that for 45 years, people on both sides of the border could not be sure whether the status quo reached in 1945 might be changed at some future date.

==== Belgium ====
The "Working Party on Provisional Adjustments to the Western Frontiers of Germany" approved in 1949 the provisional transfer of 20 km^{2} (7.7 sq mi) containing 500 inhabitants to Belgium:

1. Bildchen (returned in 1956)
2. Lichtenbusch (returned in 1956)
3. Fringshaus — roads between Roetgen and Fringshaus, Fringshaus and Lammersdorf, Fringshaus and Konzen (first two returned in 1956)
4. Leykoul (eastern part returned in 1956)
5. Elsenborn
6. Losheim (only the village returned in 1956)
7. Hemmeres (returned in 1956)

As part of the 1956 treaty, in exchange for the territory ceded by Germany, Belgium ceded to Germany its territory north of the Fringshaus roads and bounded by the Vennbahn. The detached territory, in 1956 containing 704 inhabitants including refugees, was, prior to its 1956 dissolution and partition between West Germany and Belgium, ruled as an independent territory by Belgian Army Major General Paul Bolle, who enjoyed dictatorial powers.

==== Netherlands ====
Despite the more extensive annexation proposals of the Bakker-Schut Plan, only a few border modifications were implemented. On 23 April 1949, Dutch troops occupied an area of 69 km^{2} (27 sq mi), the largest parts of which were Elten (near Emmerich am Rhein) and Selfkant. Many other small border changes were executed, mostly in the vicinity of Arnhem and Dinxperlo. At that time, these areas were inhabited by a total of almost 10,000 people.

Starting in March 1957, West Germany negotiated with the Netherlands for the return of these areas. The negotiations led to an agreement (German: Vertrag vom 8. April 1960 zwischen der Bundesrepublik Deutschland und dem Königreich der Niederlande zur Regelung von Grenzfragen und anderen zwischen beiden Ländern bestehenden Problemen; short: Ausgleichsvertrag, i.e. treaty of settlement) made in The Hague on 8 April 1960, in which Germany agreed to pay DEM 280 million for the return of Elten, Selfkant, and Suderwick, as Wiedergutmachung.

The territory was returned to Germany on 1 August 1963, except for one small hill (about 3 km^{2}, 1.2 sq mi) near Wyler village, called Duivelsberg/Wylerberg which was annexed by the Netherlands.

==== France ====
Starting on 16 February 1946 France de facto disentangled the Saar area and the separate Saar Protectorate of France was established when its constitution came into force on 17 December 1947, further attaching parts of the Prussian Rhine Province and the Bavarian Palatinate (Saarpfalz). Like the former eastern territories of Germany the Saar area was out of the jurisdiction of the Allied Control Council for Germany and thus not part of Allied-occupied Germany. However, unlike the eastern territories, the domestic Saar population was not expelled by the controlling French. With the effect of 1 January 1957, the Saar Protectorate declared its accession to the Federal Republic of Germany, as provided by its Grundgesetz (constitution) art. 23 (Little Reunification), thus becoming the new federal state of Saarland. Kehl was directly annexed to France in 1945 and returned to Germany in 1953.

==== Poland ====
In 1949, there was modest exchange of territory between the Polish People's Republic and the German Democratic Republic (GDR). What is now the1 B 104/B 113 road junction at Linken, Mecklenburg-Western Pomerania to the immediate west of the Polish town of Lubieszyn was transferred from Poland to the GDR in return for a narrow strip of land lying directly on the west side of the road that connected the settlements of Linki and Buk. This move necessitated the creation of a new road linking Lubieszyn to Linki and Buk that mirrored the new shape of the border. In 1951, a small area of land on Usedom Island (Polish: Uznam) was ceded from the German Democratic Republic (Eastern Germany) to Poland. The water pumping station for Świnoujście lies on that land and was therefore handed over to Poland. In return, a similarly-sized area north of Mescherin, including the village of Staffelde (Polish: Staw), was transferred from Poland to the German Democratic Republic. In 1968, East Germany and Poland signed a treaty for the Baltic continental shelf delimitation. On 22 May 1989, East Germany and Poland completed the delimitation of their territorial waters in the Gulf of Szczecin.

== See also ==
- Administrative divisions of Nazi Germany
- Areas annexed by Nazi Germany
