= 1935 Saar status referendum =

1935 referendum

- 13 January 1935

Results
Choice	Votes	%
Reunification with Germany	477,089	90.73%
Status quo	46,613	8.86%
Unification with France	2,124	0.40%
Valid votes	525,826	99.59%
Invalid or blank votes	2,161	0.41%
Total votes	527,987	100.00%
Registered voters/turnout	539,542	97.86%

A referendum on territorial status was held in the Territory of the Saar Basin on 13 January 1935. Over 90% of voters opted for reunification with Germany, with 9% voting for the status quo as a League of Nations mandate territory and less than 0.5% opting for unification with France.

== Background ==
At the end of World War I, the Saar was separated from Germany and administered by the League of Nations. France was given control of the Saar's coal mines. After fifteen years of League of Nations administration, a referendum was scheduled to take place in the territory.

== Peacekeeping operation ==
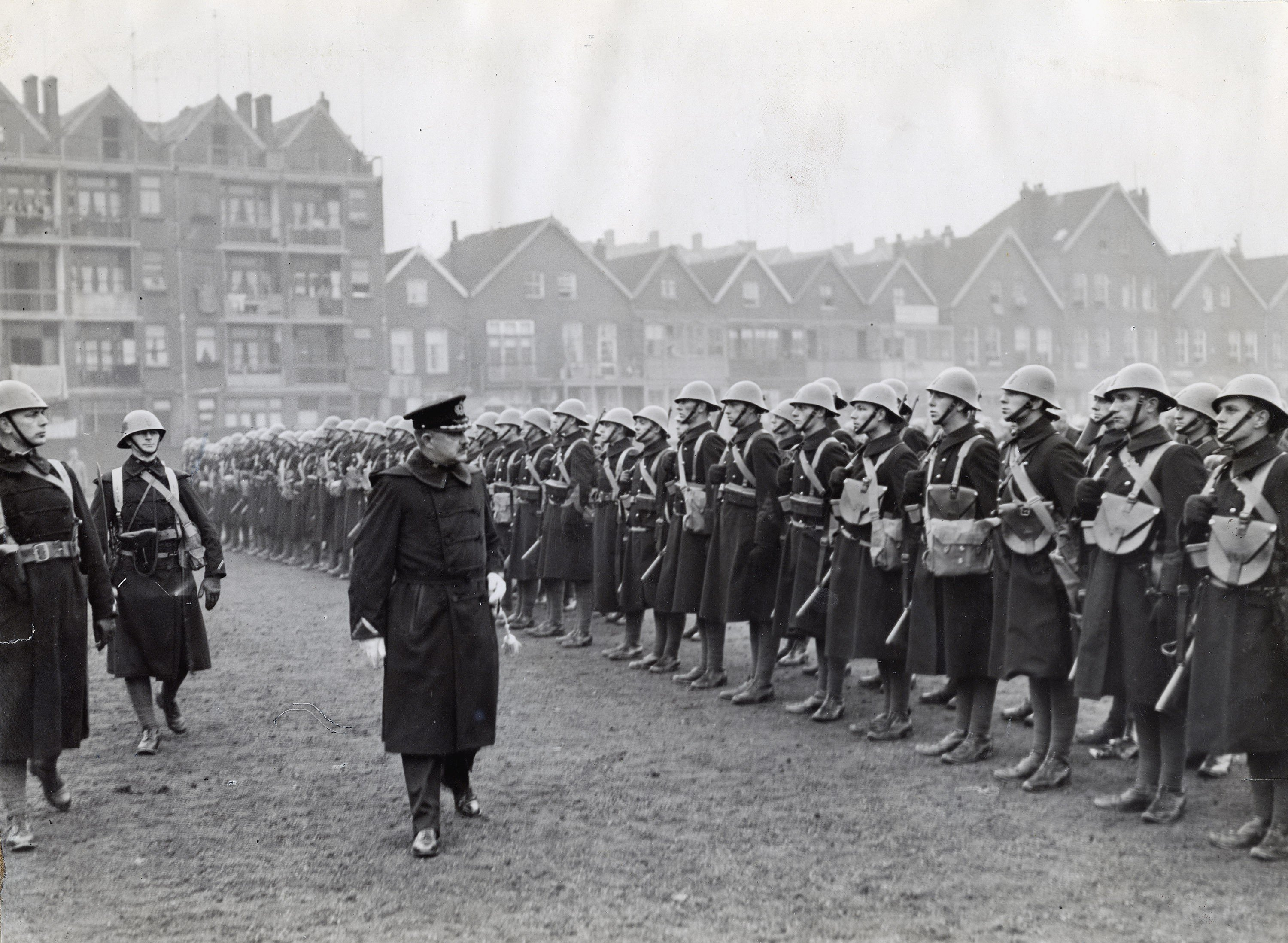
Dutch Marines preparing to leave Rotterdam for the Saar

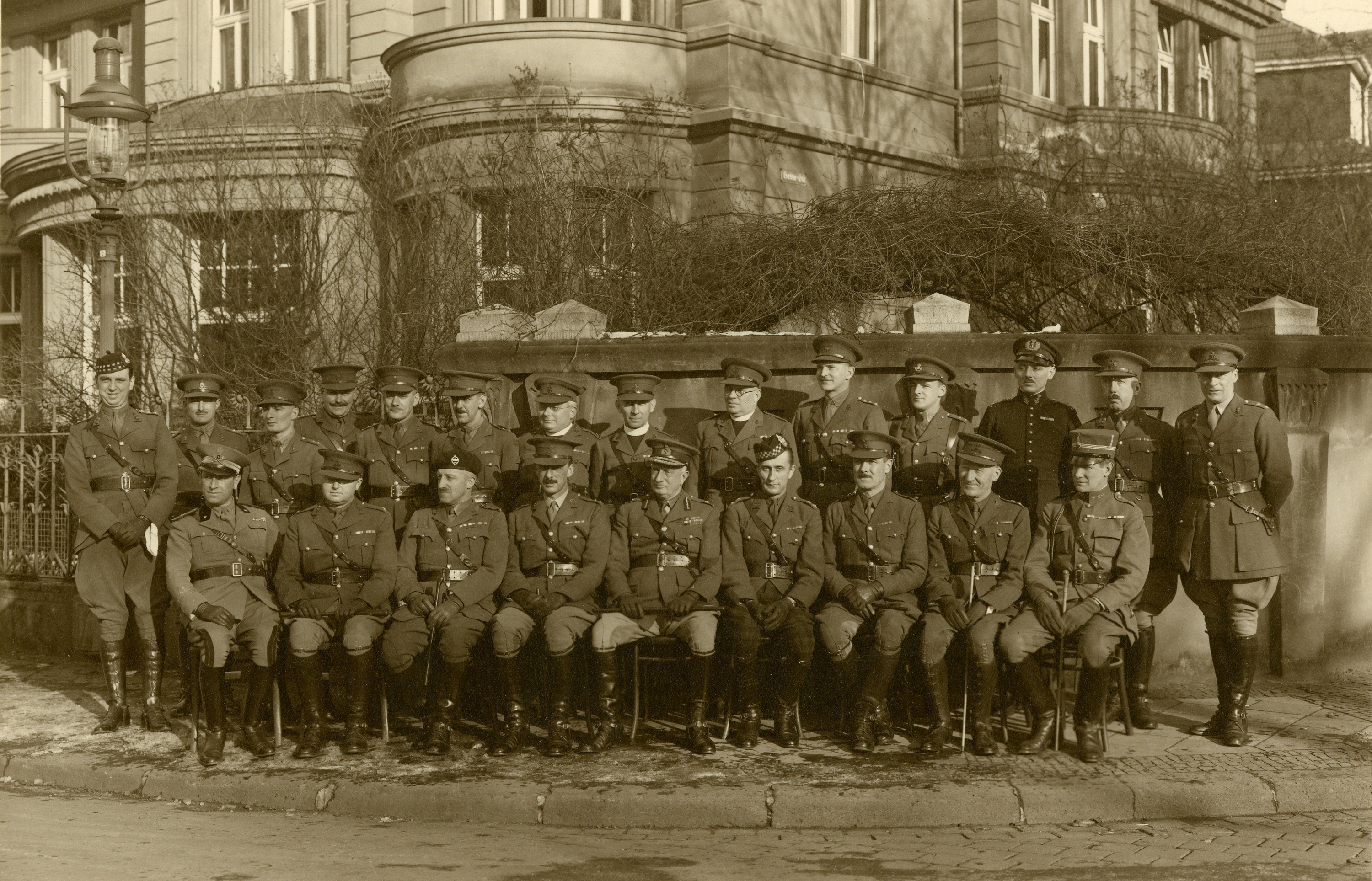
Officers of the International Headquarters 1934-1935.

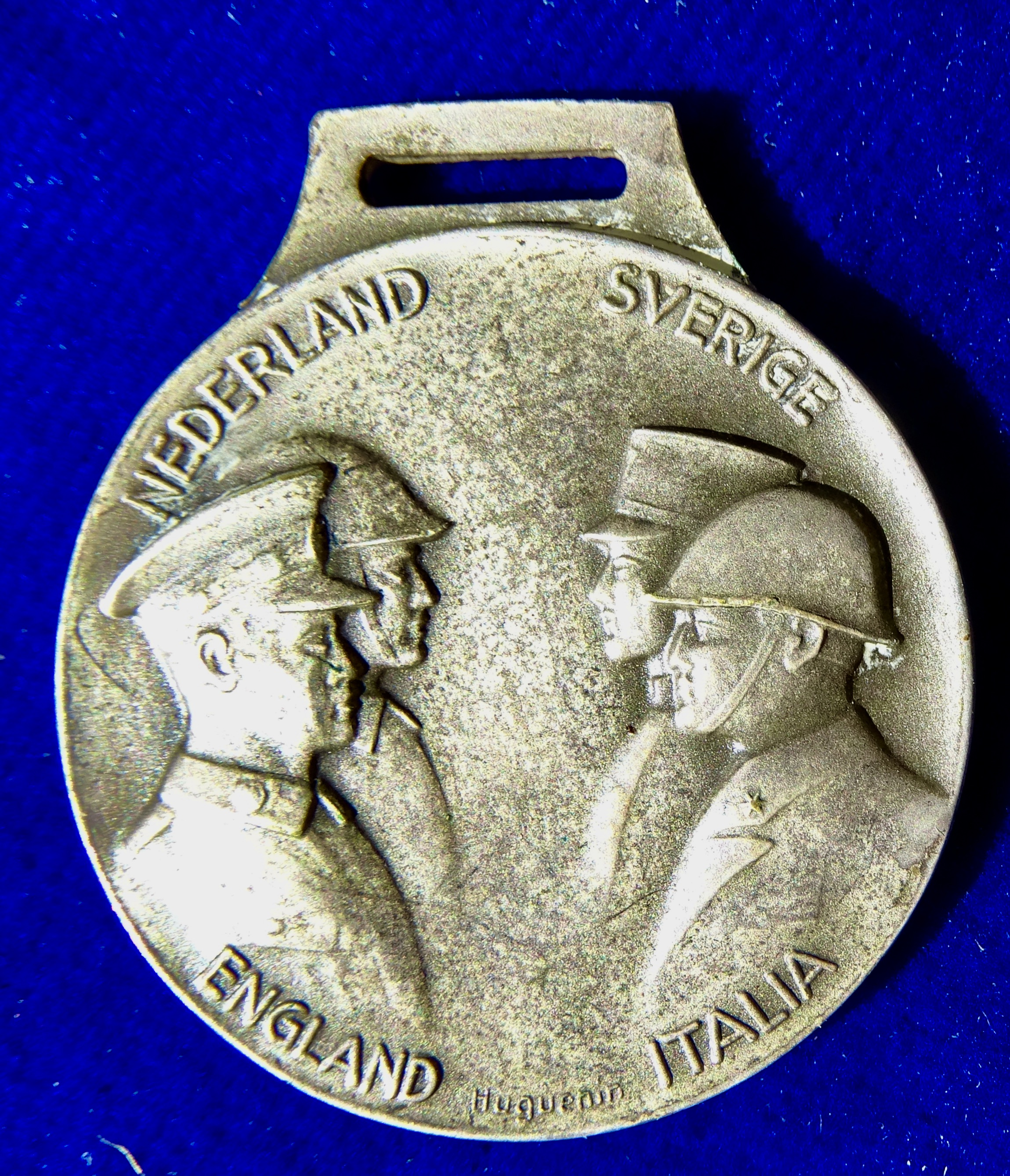
The obverse of the Saarland Plebiscite Peacekeeping Medal 1935 showing soldiers of Britain, Italy, Sweden, and The Netherlands

Towards the end of 1934, the League of Nations Council determined that a peacekeeping force would be necessary for the plebiscite period. The German and French governments agreed to allow an international force to enter the Saar. On 8 December 1934, the council unanimously approved a resolution calling for such a force. Britain (1,500 troops), Italy (1,300), Sweden (260) and the Netherlands (250) agreed to provide troops for the 3,300-strong International Force in the Saar. All expenses above and beyond those normally incurred for the same troops were charged to the League fund set aside for the plebiscite. The League appointed a commander, British Major-General John Brind, with operational control of the force. Troops patrolled, but did not police, the Saar. They were not to respond except to emergencies and at the request of local authorities. There was little to no violence during the plebiscite and the peacekeeping effort was regarded as a success.

== Campaign ==
While most political groups in the Saar initially supported its return to Germany, opponents of Nazism in the Saar began having doubts and misgivings after Adolf Hitler came to power. Due to Hitler's oppression of their German counterparts, communists and socialists supported a continuation of the League of Nations administration, and a delay in the plebiscite until after the Nazis were no longer in power in Germany. Roman Catholics were divided in regards to returning to German rule.

In order to achieve victory in the referendum, the Nazis resorted to "a mixture of cajolery and brutal pressure". In 1933, Sarah Wambaugh, one of the members of the Plebiscite Commission, stated that complaints of a Nazi "reign of terror" had been made by non-Nazi Saarlanders and by the foreign press. The complaints included allegations that the Nazis engaged in intimidation, "espionage, secret denunciations, kidnappings ..., ... interception of letters and telegrams, [and] listening-in to telephone conversations", among other things. In response, the Saar Governing Commission had to "promulgate several restrictive decrees for the maintenance of public order".

In November 1934, fearing an armed intervention by France, which the German armed forces of the time would have been in no position to resist, the German government changed its tactics and reduced its belligerency. Josef Bürckel, Hitler's commissioner for the Saar, banned the wearing of uniforms within a 40-kilometre (25 mi) zone along the Saar frontier between 10 January 1935 and 10 February 1935. Burckel also banned meetings, parades, and processions in this area. Jakob Pirro, the Nazi leader in the Saar, told his followers to obey the strictest discipline and implemented harsh penalties for any infractions.

The German government was determined to score a landslide victory in the referendum for propaganda purposes, and created the Deutsche Front for this purpose in July 1933, which became a formidable force in the Saar thanks to generous financial support from Germany and its brutal methods, such as threats and voter intimidation. The Catholic Centre Party of the Saar was merged into the new pro-German front, "yielding to threats of what would happen after the day of reckoning in 1935." According to Guenter Lewy, the people of the Saar increasingly preferred to stay in France because of the suppression and harassment of the Catholic Church in Germany by Nazi authorities.

Voters were outraged by the killings of two prominent Catholic leaders, Erich Klausener and Adalbert Probst, in the Night of the Long Knives. A requiem mass for them drew large crowds, and a Catholic newspaper Neue Saar Post opposing Saar's return to Germany gained many new followers. Sarah Wambaugh observed "that the odds were now even, that the Church held the balance, and that unless Hitler should succeed in rehabilitating himself and should placate the Church, or unless the Nazi regime should be overthrown before January [the plebiscite had been scheduled for January 13, 1935], the Territory might be indefinitely lost to the Reich." The campaign on both sides focused on appealing to the Political Catholicism of the voters. On 30 November 1934, over seventy members of the Catholic clergy founded an organisation named Deutscher Volksbund für Christlichsoziale Gemeinschaft, which held meetings every Sunday under mottoes "for return to Germany, but not to Hitler Germany" and "Christ is our leader, not Hitler." The Volksbund proclaimed that a "great majority" of Saar clergy supported the status quo and urged voters to block the return of the Saar on the grounds that the best way to serve Germany is to block the "un-German National Socialist dictatorship". The Nazis made an effort to combat concerns about their anti-clericalism by appealing to the voters' anti-communism; pro-German newspapers printed pictures of atrocities from the Soviet Union, contrasting them to the "peace and prosperity" of the German Reich. However, ultimately the National Socialists mainly focused on intimidation, with Nazi paramilitaries "threatening retribution to all those who might dare to vote against return to the fatherland".

== Results ==
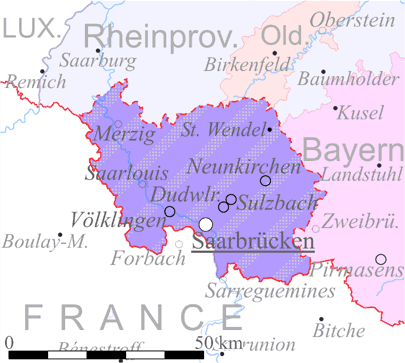
Territory of the Saar Basin

In the referendum, voters were asked whether the Saar should remain under League of Nations administration, return to Germany or become part of France. To the surprise of neutral observers as well as the Nazis themselves, over 90% voted in favour of reuniting with Germany. Every voting district saw at least 83% of voters support returning the Saar to German rule, and despite the claim of Georges Clemenceau (who had died in 1929) that there were 150,000 Frenchmen in the Saar, fewer than 0.5% of voters supported the annexation of the Saar by France.

The legitimacy of the referendum was questioned by foreign observers on grounds of widespread voter intimidation by the Berlin-sponsored Deutsche Front. The Sunday Mail of Adelaide, South Australia, reported that the opponents of the Saar's return to Germany were "hounded off the streets and even blockaded in homes". Jewish shops were boycotted and vandalised, and Nazi supporters visited Jewish homes and demanded their voting identity cards in exchange for protection. In his report, Marinus van der Goes van Naters stated that the Deutsche Front infiltrated public services such as municipal authorities and the police, and voters were forced to vote for Saar's return to Germany under threats of dismissals or loss of pension. The Bulletin of International News wrote that the Nazi militias "went from house to house asking people to sign an undertaking to do all they could to secure the return of the Saar to Germany", while pro-Nazi police officials kept "black lists" of people opposed to German rule of the Saar to be prevented from voting. In addition, socialist and separatist newspapers such as the Volkstimme and Volkszeitung were taken down, and there were reports of illegal seizures and confiscations of documents by the members of the Deutsche Front. Lewy Gunter believes that the result of the referendum could have been different with proper supervision, given the Catholic hostility towards the Nazi regime.

Choice	Votes	%
Reunification with Germany	477,089	90.73
Status quo	46,613	8.86
Unification with France	2,124	0.40
Total	525,826	100.00
Valid votes	525,826	99.59
Invalid/blank votes	2,161	0.41
Total votes	527,987	100.00
Registered voters/turnout	539,542	97.86
Source: Direct Democracy

== Aftermath ==
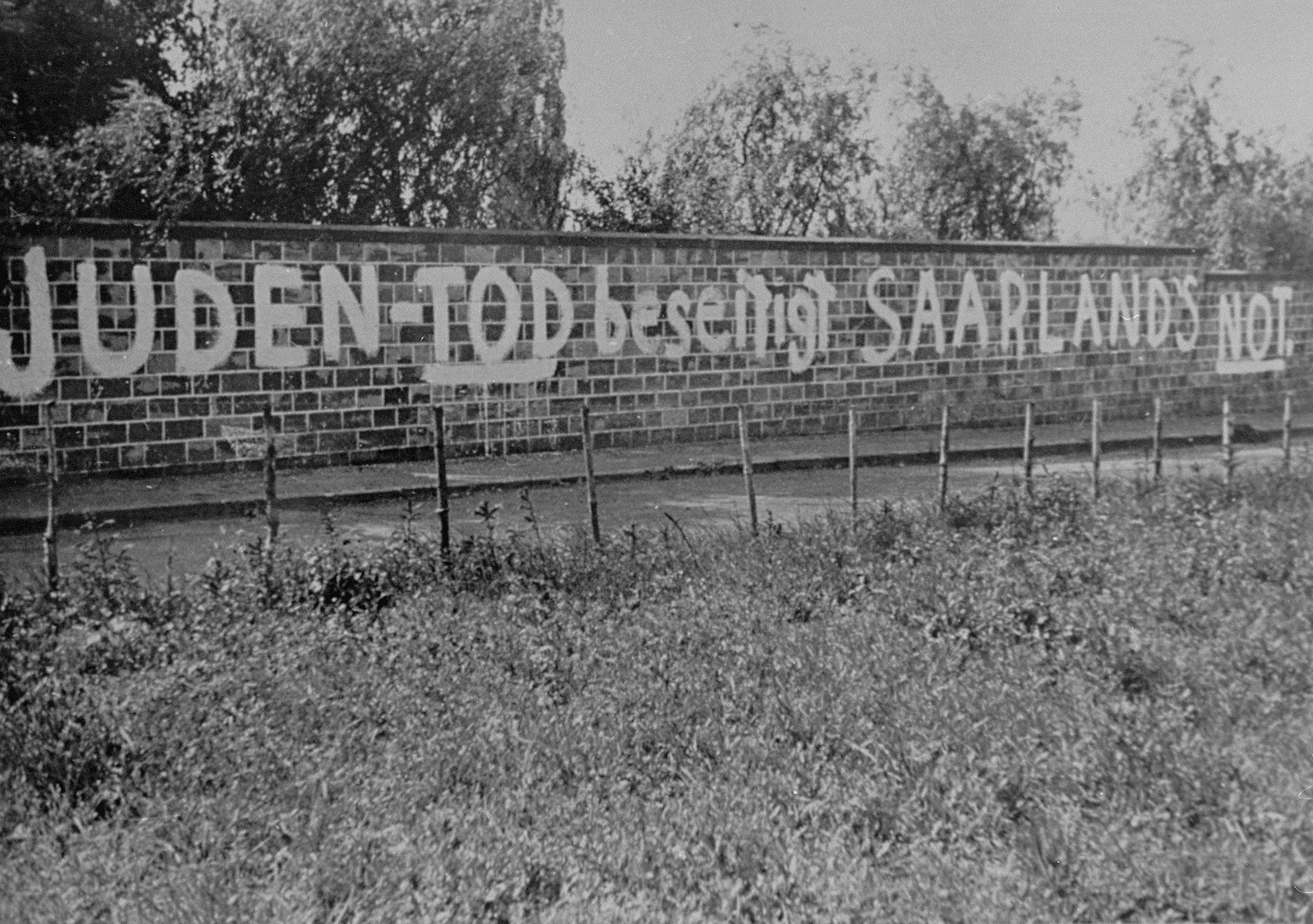
"The death of the Jews will end the Saarland's distress"—graffiti in a Jewish cemetery, November 1938

Following the referendum, the Council of the League of Nations decided that the Saar should return to Germany. The Saar once again became part of Germany on 1 March 1935, with Josef Bürckel as Reichskommissar. In 1936, it was incorporated into the Gau of Rheinpfalz (Rhine Palatinate) to form the Gau Pfalz-Saar (renamed Gau Saarpfalz in January 1936 and Gau Westmark in December 1940). Josef Bürckel remained the Gauleiter and, from 11 March 1941, Reichsstatthalter until his death in September 1944. He was succeeded by Willi Stöhr who served until the end of the war in May 1945.

After the plebiscite, the Nazi authorities proceeded to clamp down on the Catholic Church's influence in public life, repressing and forcefully disbanding Catholic organisations. Guenter Lewy reports that the prosecution of the Catholic Church in the Saar was even worse than in the rest of Germany, as the Reichskonkordat did not apply to the territory. Even the part of Catholic clergy that campaigned for return of the Saar to Germany, such as Johann Ludger Schlich, was now forced to flee.

The report of General Brind on the Saar force recommended that in the future all such peacekeeping forces be assembled from countries with no direct interest in the matter at hand. He noted that only a small force was necessary, since it was the moral authority of its presence that mattered. Both observations are central to modern peacekeeping as opposed to collective security.

The Nansen International Office for Refugees was responsible for the successful settlement of the Saar refugees in Paraguay after 1935.

== See also ==
- 1955 Saar Statute referendum
- 1938 Austrian Anschluss referendum
