= Ernst Ludwig Leyser =

German Nazi Party official (1896–1973)

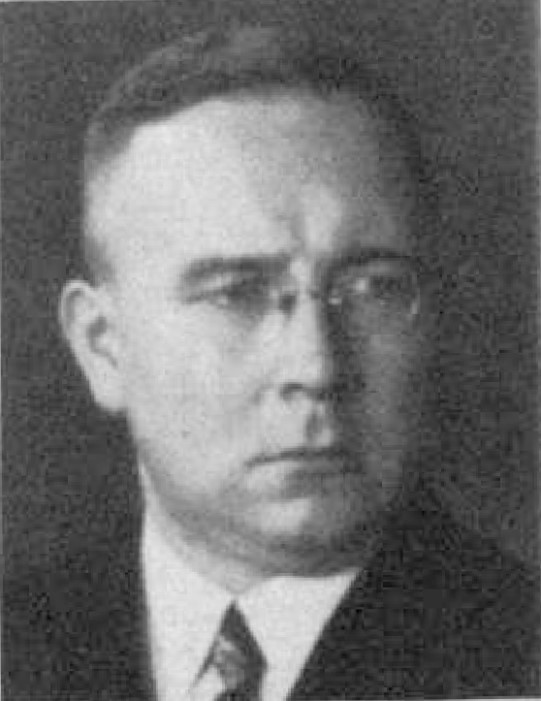
- Leyser in 1938

Landeshauptmann Province of Nassau
- In office 16 January 1945 – 22 March 1945

Generalkommissar, Zhytomyr Reichskommissariat Ukraine
- In office 29 October 1942 – 21 September 1943
- Preceded by: Kurt Klemm

Deputy Gauleiter Gau Rhenish Palatinate
- In office 1 November 1927 – 29 September 1944 (Inactive from July 1941)
- Preceded by: Position created
- Succeeded by: Willi Stöhr

Reichstag Deputy
- In office 12 November 1933 – 8 May 1945

Landtag of Bavaria Deputy
- In office 24 April 1932 – 14 October 1933

Personal details
- Born: 10 September 1896 Homburg, Palatinate, Kingdom of Bavaria, German Empire
- Died: 6 December 1973 (aged 71) Bad Bergzabern, Rhineland-Palatinate, West Germany
- Party: Nazi Party
- Occupation: Deutsche Reichsbahn manager
- Civilian awards: Golden Party Badge; Blood Order

Military service
- Allegiance: German Empire
- Branch/service: Imperial German Army
- Years of service: 1913–1918
- Rank: Unteroffizier
- Unit: Infantry Regiment 118 (4th Grand Ducal Hessian); Field Artillery Regiment 22
- Battles/wars: World War I
- Military awards: Iron Cross, 2nd class Wound Badge in silver

Ernst Ludwig Leyser (10 September 1896 – 6 December 1973) was a German Nazi Party official and SS-Brigadeführer. He was the long-serving Deputy Gauleiter of Gau Rhenish Palatinate (later, Gau Westmark). During the Second World War, he was involved in the deportation of Jews from the Gau and the forced expulsion of residents of occupied-Lorraine. He also served as a Generalkommissar of the occupation administration in the Reichskommissariat Ukraine, where he carried out harsh Germanization policies. In the last few months of the war, he was the provincial administrator of the Prussian Province of Nassau. After the war, he underwent denazification proceedings, avoided any criminal convictions and was elected as a city councillor in Bad Bergzabern.

== Early life ==
Leyser was born in Homburg in the Rhenish Palatinate, the son of a Palatinate Railway inspector. From 1903 to 1907, he attended Volksschule in Hettenleidelheim and, until 1913, the Gymnasium in Grünstadt. On 1 October 1913, he enlisted as a one-year volunteer in Infantry Regiment 118 "Prince Carl" (4th Grand Ducal Hessian), headquartered in Worms. He served in the First World War as an Unteroffizier (non-commissioned officer) and officer candidate with this regiment and with Field Artillery Regiment 22, was wounded five times and was transferred home on 6 November 1918 after being injured by poison gas in the final days of the war.

Leyser was discharged from military service on 22 November 1918, having been awarded the Iron Cross, 2nd class, and the Wound Badge in silver. He became a member of the Deutschvölkischer Schutz- und Trutzbund, the largest and most active antisemitic organization in the Weimar Republic. Initially unemployed, from June through December 1919 he worked as an office clerk for the railway. From January to August 1920, he was employed by an insurance company and then returned to railway work as a clerk at the recently formed Deutsche Reichsbahn. Following the French occupation of the Ruhr in 1923, he was expelled from the Palatinate for engaging in passive resistance to the occupation and was transferred to Starnberg, not returning until January 1925. He became an assistant operations manager in July 1928 and advanced to operations manager in December 1929. He worked from December 1928 until 1931 in the western Palatinate before being transferring to Neustadt an der Haardt (today, Neustadt an der Weinstraße) further to the east.

== Nazi Party career ==
In October 1920, Leyser joined the Nazi Party (membership number 5,418). As an early Party member, he was considered to be an Alter Kämpfer and later would be awarded the Golden Party Badge. While a member of the Ortsgruppe (local group) in Starnberg, he planned to participate in Adolf Hitler's Beer Hall Putsch in November 1923, although he failed to do so due to a train delay but nevertheless was later awarded the Blood Order. After the Party was banned, Leyser joined the Greater German People's Community (GVG) and the Schützen- und Wanderbund (shooting and hiking association), two Nazi front organizations. After his return to the Palatinate, he founded an Ortsgruppe and a Sturmabteilung unit in Neustadt an der Haardt in April 1925. He joined the leadership staff of Gau Rhenish Palatinate, and was formally readmitted to the re-founded Party on 9 October 1925 (membership number 20,603).

On 1 November 1927, Leyser was appointed the Deputy Gauleiter of the Rhenish Palatinate under Gauleiter Josef Bürckel. From 1928 to 1934, he also was the personnel officer and the representative for church affairs in the Gau leadership. From early 1928 until July 1931, he was an Assessor (lay judge) on the Gau Uschla, the Party investigatory and disciplinary committee and, from July 1931 until August 1934, he was its chairman. In 1932, he served for eight months as acting chairman of the Second Chamber of the national Uschla at the Brown House, the Party headquarters in Munich.

Leyser was also active in electoral politics. On 24 April 1932, he was elected as a deputy to the Bavarian Landtag where he served until that body was dissolved by the Nazi government on 14 October 1933. He subsequently represented electoral constituency 27 (Palatinate) in the Reichstag from 12 November 1933 until the fall of the regime on 8 May 1945.

On 15 January 1934, Leyser was named head of the Josef Bürckel Foundation. On 1 March 1935, he was the chief organizer of the parade for the celebrations of the reintegration of the Saar with the German Reich. It was joined to the Rhenish Palatinate to form Gau Saar-Palatinate. On 20 May 1935, Leyser was made an honorary citizen of Neustadt an der Haardt.

From March 1938 to April 1940, during the absence of Bürckel as Gauleiter in Vienna, Leyser served as acting Gauleiter of the Saar-Palatinate. After Bürckel's return, Leyser resumed his duties as Deputy Gauleiter during the period when Bürckel embarked on a campaign to rid the Gau of Jews. A deportation to unoccupied Vichy France was organized, with two trainloads of Jews being rounded up and deported with less than two hours notice on 22 October 1940. The 960 individuals from the Saar-Palatinate were transported to the Gurs internment camp near the Pyrenees where about one-quarter perished from the poor conditions of their confinement. Most of the survivors, starting in August 1942, were transferred to the Auschwitz extermination camp where they were murdered.

In addition, the Nazi administration undertook a campaign of forced Germanization of occupied-Lorraine, which since the defeat of France in June 1940 was administered as part of Gau Saar-Palatinate, now renamed Gau Westmark. Some 57,000 residents were expelled between 11 and 21 November 1940. Within a few months, 40 percent of the inhabitants were forced to leave and were replaced by German settlers, many from the Saar-Palatinate. Meanwhile, relations between Leyser and Bürckel had become increasingly strained and, in February 1941, Leyser requested that he be allowed to relinquish his party duties and instead enter state or municipal service. From July 1941 onward, although he continued to nominally hold the position of Deputy Gauleiter, he was actively assigned to other duties.

In addition to his political duties, Leyser was also a business executive who chaired the supervisory boards of several electrical and gas utilities, including Elektrowerbung AG and Pfalzwerke AG in Ludwigshafen, and Saar-Ferngas AG and Vereinigte Saar-Elektrizitäts AG in Saarbrucken.

== Service with the SS ==
Leyser originally joined the Schutzstaffel (SS) on 28 September 1925 (SS number 153) and founded the SS unit in Neustadt an der Haardt, one of the first in Germany. He was commissioned as an SS-Sturmführer in April 1926 and continued to lead the SS in Neustadt an der Haardt until resigning in 1928 when he took up his duties with Uschla. Leyser was readmitted to the SS on 1 January 1935, with SS number 219,077, although he was later reassigned his original lower number, 153. Effective 1 January 1935, he was promoted to SS-Standartenführer and, on 9 November 1936, to SS-Oberführer. He attained his final promotion to SS-Brigadeführer, effective 30 January 1942. Leyser was assigned to SS-Abschnitt (SS district) XXIX in Mannheim in January 1935, SS-Oberabschnitt (main district) Südwest in February 1936, SS-Oberabschnitt Rhein in January 1937 and SS-Oberabschnitt Westmark in October 1942.

== Activities during the Second World War ==
On 30 September 1941, in response to his reassignment request, Leyser was selected to serve as the Generalkommissar for Chernihiv, in the Reichskommissariat Ukraine, but he was unable to take up the post because the area continued to be administered by the Wehrmacht's Army Group South Rear Area. However, from October 1942 to September 1943, Leyser served as Generalkommissar of the Zhytomyr district in the Reichskommissariat where he was involved in numerous war crimes as part of the Nazi Germanization policy. Approximately 184,000 forced laborers were deported from his district to the German Reich. He also was charged with expelling the native Ukrainian population from the Hegewald area in order to resettle ethnic Germans (Volksdeutsche) in their place. In June 1943, Leyser issued a report to Reichsminister for the Occupied Eastern Territories Alfred Rosenberg that was critical of Ukrainian Reichskommissar Erich Koch. Specifically, Leyser complained that Koch's brutal regime was increasing Soviet partisan activity, and that over 60 percent of the produce in his jurisdiction was falling into partisan hands. He also complained that the ongoing conscription of Ukrainian laborers, despite the workload quota being attained, was having an adverse effect on his ability to administer his district. In addition, he maintained a benign attitude toward the Orthodox Church, even retaining in their posts two bishops who were known to be Soviet agents. In September 1943, Leyser was recalled from Ukraine and discharged from the SS.

Though unemployed, Leyser declined the offer of a lesser post as a Landrat (district administrator). In September 1944, he secured a post in Metz as the Gau inspector for fortifications in occupied-Lorraine and the Saar. This was followed from 1 to 21 December 1944, by his assignment to Army Group C in Italy as a Generalkommissar representing Joseph Goebbels in his role as Reich Plenipotentiary for Total War. His next and final posting, from 16 January until 22 March 1945, was as the Landeshauptmann (provincial administrator) of the Prussian Province of Nassau at its capital in Wiesbaden.

== Post-war period ==
After the end of the Second World War, Leyser lived in Bavaria under an assumed name until 1948. He returned to Wiesbaden, turned himself into the American occupation forces and was interned at Darmstadt. In October 1948, he was handed over to the French authorities and interned in Landau in der Pfalz until June 1949. Returning to Germany, Leyser was jailed in Trier and underwent a denazification proceeding in August 1949. He was classified into category 3 (lesser offenders) and released from custody in December 1949. Despite an appeal, the proceedings were closed at the end of March 1950. Criminal proceedings initiated against him by the Frankenthal Regional Court for crimes against humanity were dropped in September 1951 due to insufficient evidence. After his release from custody, he initially worked for the church and, until his retirement in 1956, as a railway worker in Neustadt and Ludwigshafen. He founded the eponymous "Leyser electoral group" in Bad Bergzabern and served as a city councilor between 1956 and 1964 first under its auspices, and later as a member of the Free Democratic Party. From 1956 to 1960, he also served as an honorary second deputy mayor in Bad Bergzabern. From 1956 to 1971, he headed the adult education center at the local community college, and was also a member of the synod of the Evangelical Church of the Palatinate from 1961 to 1969.

== See also ==
- Deportation der Juden aus Baden und der Saarpfalz

== Sources ==
- Hanisch, Martin: Leyser, Ernst Ludwig in Neustadt und Nationalsozialismus
- Information about Ernst Ludwig Leyser in the Reichstag database
- "Ernst Ludwig Leyser" (in German). Haus der Bayerischen Geschichte.
- Krausnick, Helmut; Broszat, Martin; Buchheim, Hans; Jacobsen, Hans-Adolf (1968). Anatomy of the S.S. State. New York: Walker and Company.
- Leyser, Ernst Ludwig im Lexikon zum Projekt "Volksgemeinschaft" in der Gauhauptstadt. Neustadt an der Weinstraße und der Nationalsozialismus.
- Leyser, Ernst Ludwig in the Rheinland-Pfälzische Personendatenbank
- Leyser, Ernst Ludwig in the Saarland Biographien
- Lilla, Joachim: Leyser, Ernst in Staatsminister, leitende Verwaltungsbeamte und (NS-)Funktionsträger in Bayern 1918 bis 1945
- Miller, Michael D.; Schulz, Andreas (2017). Gauleiter: The Regional Leaders of the Nazi Party and Their Deputies, 1925–1945. Vol. 2 (Georg Joel – Dr. Bernhard Rust). R. James Bender Publishing. ISBN 978-1-932-97032-6.
- Schiffer Publishing Ltd., ed. (2000). SS Officers List: SS-Standartenführer to SS-Oberstgruppenführer (As of 30 January 1942). Schiffer Military History Publishing. ISBN 0-7643-1061-5.
- Stockhorst, Erich (1985). 5000 Köpfe: Wer War Was im 3. Reich. Arndt. ISBN 978-3-887-41116-9.

== Additional reading ==
- Ernst Klee: Das Personenlexikon zum Dritten Reich. Wer war was vor und nach 1945. Fischer-Taschenbuch-Verlag, Frankfurt-am-Main 2007, ISBN 978-3-596-16048-8, S. 371.
- Joachim Lilla, Martin Döring, Andreas Schulz: Statisten in Uniform. Die Mitglieder des Reichstags 1933–1945. Ein biographisches Handbuch. Unter Einbeziehung der völkischen und nationalsozialistischen Reichstagsabgeordneten ab Mai 1924. Droste, Düsseldorf 2004, ISBN 3-7700-5254-4.
- Franz Maier: Biographisches Organisationshandbuch der NSDAP und ihrer Gliederungen im Gebiete des heutigen Landes Rheinland-Pfalz. Veröffentlichungen der Kommission des Landtages für die Geschichte des Landes Rheinland-Pfalz, 28. Hase & Koehler, Mainz 2007. ISBN 3-7758-1407-8, S. 331–334.
- Nicholas John Williams: Modellkarriere Leyser: Bürokrat, Schreibtischtäter, Rad im Getriebe des NS-Systems. Zeitschrift für die Geschichte der Saargegend|ZGS. Zeitschrift für die Geschichte der Saargegend 63, 2015, S. 59–83.
- Dieter Wolfanger: Ernst Ludwig Leyser. Stellvertretender Gauleiter der NSDAP in der Saarpfalz. Eine biographische Skizze. In: Jahrbuch für westdeutsche Landesgeschichte, 14, 1988, S. 209–217.
