= Wambaugh =

Wambaugh is a surname. Notable people with the surname include:

- Eugene Wambaugh (1856–1940), American legal scholar
- Joseph Wambaugh (1937–2025), American writer
- Sarah Wambaugh (1882–1955), American political scientist, daughter of Eugene
