= Friedrich Wambsganss =

German teacher and Nazi official (1886–1979)

Gauleiter Gau Rhinepfalz
- In office February 1925 – 13 March 1926
- Preceded by: Position created
- Succeeded by: Josef Bürckel

Personal details
- Born: Friedrich Heinrich Wambsganss; 25 June 1886 Rehau, Kingdom of Bavaria, German Empire
- Died: 12 January 1979 (aged 92) Rodalben, Rhineland Palatinate, West Germany
- Resting place: Kaiserslautern, Germany
- Citizenship: German
- Party: Nazi Party (NSDAP)
- Profession: Schoolteacher

Military service
- Allegiance: German Empire
- Branch/service: Royal Bavarian Army
- Years of service: 1908–1909; 1914–1918
- Rank: Oberleutnant
- Unit: 23rd Royal Bavarian Infantry Regiment; 8th Royal Bavarian Reserve Infantry Regiment
- Battles/wars: World War I
- Awards: Iron Cross, 1st and 2nd class

Friedrich Wambsganss, also known as "Fritz" Wambsganss (25 June 1886 – 12 January 1979) was a German schoolteacher, a Nazi Party official, an SA-Oberführer in the Nazi paramilitary organization, the Sturmabteilung (SA), and a Protestant synod president.

== Early life ==
Wambsganss was born in Rehau, the son of a customs officer. He attended Volksschule and Latin school in Grünstadt. He then went to the teacher training institute (Lehrerbildungsanstalt) in Kaiserslautern from 1899 to 1904 and in 1908 became an elementary school assistant teacher. He then entered military service as a one-year volunteer with the 23rd Royal Bavarian Infantry Regiment. From 1909 to 1912 he was employed as a Volksschule teacher in Sitters and Münsterappel.

When the First World War broke out, Wambsganss was called up for military service with the 8th Royal Bavarian Reserve Infantry Regiment from 1914 to 1918. He entered service as a Leutnant and held positions as a platoon leader, a mess officer, deputy battalion adjutant, and deputy battalion commander. He received the Iron Cross, 1st and 2nd class and was discharged at the end of the war with the rank of Oberleutnant. In 1918 he settled in Kaiserslautern as a Volksschule teacher, becoming a Hauptschule teacher in 1923.

== Nazi Party career ==
Wambsganss joined the Nazi Party (membership number 23,796) when the ban on it was lifted in early 1925. He co-founded the Party Ortsgruppe (local group) in Kaiserslautern and was named the first Gauleiter of Gau Rheinpfalz in February 1925. He also joined the Sturmabteilung (SA) at this time. He served as Gauleiter for just over one year and was succeeded by Josef Bürckel on 13 March 1926. Meanwhile, he continued with his career as a teacher until 1933, when he was named to the city school council in Kaiserslautern. In 1931, he was made chairman of the Rhinepfalz branch of the Militant League for German Culture, a nationalistic antisemitic political society founded by Nazi ideologue Alfred Rosenberg. In November 1931, he became the leader of the Office for Education in the Gau Rheinpfalz Party organization. He also held the position of chairman of the National Socialist Teachers League (NSLB) in the Gau from 1931 to 1935.

When the Saarland was returned to Germany in March 1935, it was merged into Gau Rhinepfalz and the jurisdiction was renamed Gau Pfalz-Saar. Wambsganss continued in his roles as Gau education leader and NSLB chairman in the expanded Gau. He also took on a regional governmental post, becoming leader of the Department for Culture and Education under Josef Bürckel who, in addition to being Gauleiter, also was the Commissioner for the Reintegration of the Saar Region. In March 1941, Bürckel became Reichsstatthalter (Reich Governor) of the now expanded Gau Westmark, which included the Civil Administration Area of Lorraine. At that time, Wambsganns became head of the Office for Education and Instruction in the new territory.

From 1933 to 1937 Wambsganss was also active in the German Christians movement. In July 1933 he was appointed to the Church leadership as a member of the regional synod in Rhinepfalz, becoming synod president on 28 June 1934. In this position, he worked toward bringing the independent Rhinepfalz Church into a unified German Evangelical Church under Reich Bishop Ludwig Müller.

Wambsganss also advanced steadily in the SA. He became the SA-Führer in Kaiserslautern, being promoted to SA-Standartenführer on 9 November 1934 and SA-Oberführer on 9 November 1937. He remained in the SA leadership ranks of SA-Brigade 15 “Westpfalz” until the end of the war in May 1945.

== Postwar ==
After the war, Wambsganss was interned in Idar-Oberstein and Landau from 1945 to 1948. In denazification proceedings on 17 November 1949, he was adjudged to be a "minor offender". On 3 March 1950, the judgment was overturned on appeal. On 31 December 1950, Wambsganss retired with a civil service pension. He died in Rodalben in 1979.

== Sources ==
- Miller, Michael D.; Schulz, Andreas (2021). Gauleiter: The Regional Leaders of the Nazi Party and Their Deputies. Vol. 3. Fonthill Media. ISBN 978-1-781-55826-3.

== External website ==
Friedrich Wambsganns in Rhineland Palatinate Personal Database (in German)
