= Willi Stöhr =

German Nazi official and politician (1903 – after 1994)

Wilhelm “Willi” Stöhr

Gauleiter of Westmark
- In office 29 September 1944 – 21 March 1945
- Preceded by: Joseph Bürckel
- Succeeded by: Office abolished

Reichsstatthalter of Westmark
- In office 4 October 1944 – 21 March 1945
- Preceded by: Joseph Bürckel
- Succeeded by: Office abolished

Chief of Civil Administration for Lorraine
- In office 4 October 1944 – 21 March 1945
- Preceded by: Joseph Bürckel
- Succeeded by: Office abolished

Deputy Gauleiter of Westmark
- In office 29 September 1944 – 31 January 1945
- Preceded by: Ernst Ludwig Leyser
- Succeeded by: None

Personal details
- Born: 6 November 1903 Wuppertal-Elberfeld, Kingdom of Prussia, German Empire
- Died: Unknown Canada
- Party: Nazi Party (NSDAP)
- Occupation: Commercial clerk

Military service
- Allegiance: Nazi Germany
- Branch/service: German Army
- Years of service: 1940
- Unit: Propaganda Company 612
- Battles/wars: Second World War
- Awards: Iron Cross, 2nd class

Wilhelm “Willi” Stöhr (6 November 1903 – after 1994 [1997?]) was a Nazi Party official and politician who served as Gauleiter of Gau Westmark in the closing months of the war. He went missing after the end of the war in Europe and later emigrated to Canada. His date of death is unknown.

== Early life ==
Born in Wuppertal-Elberfeld the son of a writer, Stöhr attended volksschule and realschule locally through 1922. He joined the Nazi Party in 1923 and was active in the Ortsgruppe (Local Group) in Wuppertal. He remained active in the Nazi movement even after the party was banned in the aftermath of the Beer Hall Putsch. He worked as a commercial clerk during these years and formally rejoined the party in 1929, also becoming a member of the Sturmabteilung (SA). Around this time he studied economics and political science at the universities in Cologne and Frankfurt. He was a member of the National Socialist German Students' League and became a speaker for this group. In 1932 he left university without completing a degree due to his participation in student riots.

== Nazi career ==
Turning to full-time Party work, Stöhr became the Ortsgruppenleiter (Local Group Leader) in Frankfurt and an Oberbannführer (Senior Banner Leader) in the Hitler Youth. After the Nazi seizure of power, Stöhr was made a member of the City Council in Frankfurt in March 1933. Also that year he was appointed Gau Inspector and adjutant to Jakob Sprenger, the Gauleiter of Hesse-Nassau, a position he would hold until 1937. In November 1933, Stöhr failed in his electoral bid for a seat in the Reichstag but in February 1935, he was appointed to fill a vacant Reichstag seat from electoral constituency 19, Hesse-Nassau, and would retain that seat until his death. That year he also became a member of the Prussian Provincial Council for the Province of Hesse-Nassau. On 1 July 1937, he became Propaganda Leader of the Gau, head of the provincial propaganda office in Hesse-Nassau and the State Cultural Officer. He would hold these posts until 1 January 1944 when he was transferred to the Nazi Party Chancellery in the Brown House in Munich to be trained for higher party leadership assignments. In 1940 he served in the German Army, as a propaganda officer with Propaganda Company 612 in France. He was awarded the Iron Cross, 2nd class.

=== Gauleiter ===
On 8 September 1944, Stöhr was assigned as the Plenipotentiary for Defensive Construction in Gau Westmark. Upon the death of Josef Bürckel, the longtime Gauleiter of Gau Westmark, on 29 September 1944 Stöhr was promoted to Deputy Gauleiter and simultaneously installed as Acting Gauleiter. As such, he also commanded the Volkssturm forces in the Gau. Then on 4 October, he was appointed Chief of Civil Administration (Chef der Zivilverwaltung) for German-occupied Lorraine, although the area was already being overrun by the Allied armies. At the same time, he was named both Acting Reichsstatthalter (Reich Governor) and Acting Reich Defense Commissioner for Gau Westmark. On 19 December 1944, he succeeded Bürckel as the Reichstag deputy from electoral constituency 27, Rheinpfalz-Saar. On 30 January 1945, his appointments were made permanent.

By 18 March 1945, the elements of the US 7th Army was threatening to overrun Stöhr's Gau and Hitler ordered that the entire population be immediately evacuated eastward. As no logistical contingency planning had been done and the transportation system was in a state of total collapse, evacuating hundreds of thousands of civilians was considered to be next to impossible to execute. According to the memoirs of Albert Speer, the Reich Minister of Armaments and War Production, he met with Stöhr who categorically stated that he would not implement such an order. Though Speer offered to take the blame by citing miscommunication, Stöhr insisted on taking the responsibility.

=== Postwar years ===
Stöhr's capital city, Saarbrücken, fell to the 70th Infantry Division on 20 March 1945. He fled the city with his Gau leadership staff but separated from them in Donauwörth in Bavaria. At the war's end, Stöhr disappeared, living under assumed names until a general amnesty was issued. Thus, he became one of the rare Gauleiters to survive the war and escape justice, never facing criminal prosecution or denazification courts. He emigrated to Canada, where he was still living in 1994; his date of death is unknown. (Note: An unconfirmed report is that he died 1997 in Prince Albert, Saskatchewan, Canada)

== Sources ==
- Klee, Ernst (2007). Das Personenlexikon zum Dritten Reich. Wer war was vor und nach 1945. Frankfurt-am-Main: Fischer-Taschenbuch-Verlag. ISBN 978-3-596-16048-8.
- Höffkes, Karl (1986). Hitlers Politische Generale. Die Gauleiter des Dritten Reiches: ein biographisches Nachschlagewerk. Tübingen: Grabert-Verlag. ISBN 3-87847-163-7.
- Miller, Michael D.; Schulz, Andreas (2021). Gauleiter: The Regional Leaders of the Nazi Party and Their Deputies, 1925 - 1945. Vol. 3 (Fritz Sauckel - Hans Zimmermann). Fonthill Media. ISBN 978-1-781-55826-3.
- Speer, Albert (1970). Inside the Third Reich. New York: Avon Books. ISBN 978-0380000715.

== External website ==
- Information about Willi Stöhr in the Reichstag database
- Willi Stöhr in the Bavarian State Library
