= Chief of Civil Administration =

Office in Nazi Germany

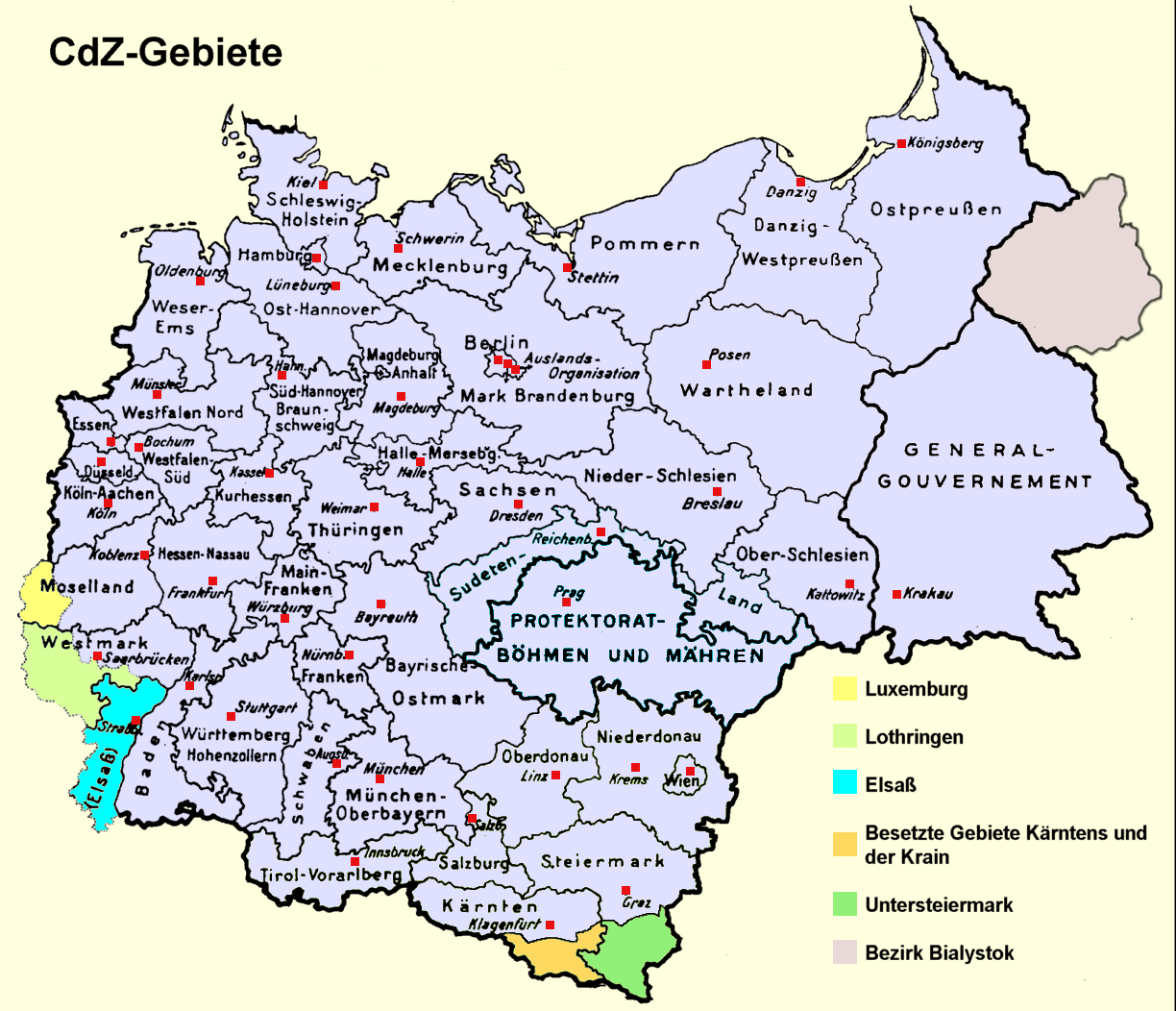
The Third Reich in 1941, with CdZ Areas marked in color

Chief of Civil Administration (German: 'Chef der Zivilverwaltung, CdZ') was an office introduced in Nazi Germany, operational during World War II. Its task was to administer civil issues according to occupation law, with the primary purpose being the support of the military command in the operational areas of the German Army. CdZ would pass his authority to a corresponding civil government after the territory in question became in the rear of the operating armed forces.

== Responsibility ==
According to German law, all executive powers in the deployment areas passed to the Wehrmacht armed forces. Overstrained and incapable to construct a civil administration, the German Army High Command willingly put these tasks to the CdZ. In the capacity as Reichsstatthalter governor, the office was under the authority of the Reich Ministry of the Interior, but operationally CdZ was under the commander-in-chief of the German Army and ultimately of Adolf Hitler as supreme commander. Hitler generally interfered in the domestic policies of the occupied territories, giving unrestricted powers to Sicherheitsdienst and SS squadrons under the command of Heinrich Himmler.

== Administrations ==
Several administrative divisions under the authority of a Chief of Civil Administration were officially designated as CdZ-Gebiete (CdZ Areas, Chief of Civil Administration Territories):

- Several CdZ organizations were established after the occupation of the Czechoslovak Sudetenland territories from 1 October 1938. However, these institutions proved a failure and were quickly superseded by the government of Konrad Henlein, who was appointed Reichskommissar on 21 October. Further CdZ officiated during the German invasion until the appointment of Konstantin von Neurath as Reich Protector of Bohemia and Moravia on 16 March 1939.
- After the 1939 Invasion of Poland, the Nazi Gauleiter Albert Forster from Danzig was appointed by Hitler to act as CdZ official on 8 September in the territory that would formally become the Reichsgau West Prussia on 26 October.
- Likewise, the former Danzig Senate President Arthur Greiser acted as CdZ in the preliminary stage of the establishment of Reichsgau Posen from 8 September until the Reichsgau formally was established on 21 October 1939.
- Also from 6 September 1939, SS-Brigadeführer Heinz Jost was appointed CdZ of the occupied Zichenau region which formally was attached to the Province of East Prussia on 26 October.

After the Battle of France, from 1940, CdZ officials were appointed in those western occupied territories that were not (yet) officially annexed by the Third Reich:

- Elsass: Reichsstatthalter Robert Heinrich Wagner, Nazi Gauleiter of Baden
- Lothringen (Lorraine): Reichskommissar Josef Bürckel, Gauleiter of Saarpfalz (Westmark)
- Luxembourg: Gustav Simon, Gauleiter of Koblenz-Trier (Moselland)

Further CdZ assumed office upon the 1941 Balkan Campaign:

- Occupied Yugoslav territories of Carinthia and Carniola: Reichsstatthalter Friedrich Rainer, Gauleiter of Carinthia
- Occupied territory of Lower Styria: Reichsstatthalter Siegfried Uiberreither, Gauleiter of Styria

After the beginning of Operation Barbarossa in June 1941, a CdZ-Gebiet Bialystok under Erich Koch, Gauleiter of East Prussia, was established on Polish territory previously occupied by the Soviet Union, converted into District Bialystok on 1 August 1941.

== See also ==
- Protectorate of Bohemia and Moravia
- General Government
- Army Group Rear Area Command (Wehrmacht)
