= Eugene Wambaugh =

American lawyer

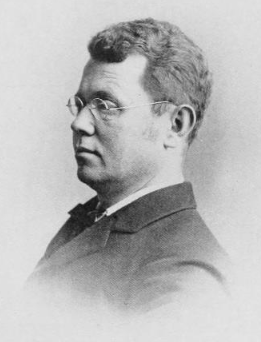
- Born: February 29, 1856; Montgomery County, Ohio, US
- Died: August 6, 1940 (aged 84); Dublin, New Hampshire, US
- Education: Harvard University
- Occupation: Legal scholar
- Spouse: Anna S. Hemphill (m. 1881; died 1938)
- Children: Miles Wambaugh; Sarah Wambaugh

Eugene Wambaugh (February 29, 1856 – August 6, 1940) was an American legal scholar.

== Biography ==
Eugene Wambaugh was born on a farm near Brookville, Ohio on February 29, 1856, to Rev. A. B. Wambaugh and Sarah Wells Wambaugh. He was educated at Harvard (A.B., 1876; LL.B., 1880). Admitted to the Ohio bar in 1880, he practiced law in Cincinnati until 1889. He was professor of law at the State University of Iowa College of Law from 1889 to 1892 and thenceforth at Harvard.

From 1906 to 1913, he was a member of the American Political Science Review, and from 1908 to 1912 served as special attorney of the United States Bureau of Corporations. Several universities gave him the honorary degree of LL.D.

Wambaugh was an adviser to the State Department on war problems in 1914 and was discharged honorably from the U.S. Army in 1919 with the rank of colonel. He retired from Harvard Law School in 1925.

Wambaugh devised the eponymous Wambaugh's Inversion Test, which provides that to determine whether a judicial statement in a common law case is ratio or obiter, you should invert the argument, that is to say, ask whether the decision would have been different, had the statement been omitted. If so, the statement is crucial and is ratio; whereas if it is not crucial, it is obiter.

Wambaugh married Anna S. Hemphill (died May 1938) of Ripley, Ohio in 1881. Their children were Sarah, an international authority on plebiscites, and Miles, a Boston attorney. Eugene Wambaugh died at his summer home in Dublin, New Hampshire on August 6, 1940.

== Selected works ==
- The Study of Cases (1892; second edition, 1894)
- Cases for Analysis (1894)
- A Selection of Cases on Agency (1896)
- Littleton's Tenures (1903)
- A Selection of Cases on Constitutional Law (four volumes, 1914–15)
