= Konzen =

Konzen is a surname. Notable people with the surname include:

- Joel Matthias Konzen (born 1950), American Roman Catholic bishop
- Neil Konzen, American computer specialist
- Pedro Henrique Konzen (born 1990), Brazilian football player
