= Civil Administration Area of Lorraine =

German civil administration in occupied Lorraine

Coordinates: 49°02′N 6°39′E

The Civil Administration Area of Lorraine (German: CdZ-Gebiet Lothringen), also translated as the Territory of the Chief of Civil Administration of Lorraine, was an administrative division of Gau Westmark from 1940 to 1945.

== History ==
After the outbreak of the Second World War and the defeat of France in 1940, the department of Moselle, renamed CdZ-Gebiet Lothringen, was added to Gau Westmark on 30 November 1940. In Nazi Germany, a CdZ-Gebiet was the name for a new German territory, under civil administration. This territory was under the authority of Josef Bürckel, Reichskommissar and Gauleiter.

CdZ-Gebiet Lothringen was located in the southern part of Gau Westmark. It corresponds exactly to the current department of Moselle in France. The capital of CdZ-Gebiet Lothringen was Metz. It comprised the subdistricts (Kreise) of:

1. Boulay, (Landkreis Bolchen);
2. Château-Salins, (Landkreis Salzburgen);
3. Forbach, (Landkreis Forbach);
4. Metz, (Landkreis Metz);
5. Metz, (Stadtkreis Metz);
6. Sarrebourg, (Landkreis Saarburg);
7. Sarreguemines, (Landkreis Saargemünd);
8. Saint-Avold, (Landkreis Sankt Avold);
9. Thionville, (Landkreis Diedenhofen-Ost);
10. Thionville, (Landkreis Diedenhofen-West);

== Sources ==
- Territoriale Veränderungen in Deutschland und deutsch verwalteten Gebieten 1874 - 1945 on territorial.de
