= Sarah Wambaugh =

American political scientist

Sarah Wambaugh FAAAS
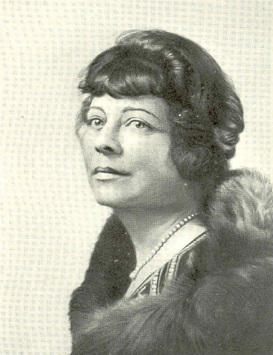
- Born: March 6, 1882; Cincinnati, Ohio
- Died: November 12, 1955 (aged 73); Cambridge, Massachusetts
- Education: Radcliffe College, A.B. (1902), A.M. (1917)
- Father: Eugene Wambaugh

Sarah Wambaugh (March 6, 1882 – November 12, 1955) was an American political scientist.

== Biography ==
She was born in Cincinnati, Ohio, the daughter of legal scholar Eugene Wambaugh. She earned an A.B. in 1902 and an A.M. in 1917 from Radcliffe College, in Cambridge, Massachusetts, where she also later taught. She also carried out studies in England; in London and Oxford.

Wambaugh eventually became recognized as the world's leading authority on plebiscites. Wambaugh had joined the membership of the Secretariat of the League of Nations in 1920. She was an advisor to the Peruvian government for the Tacna-Arica Plebiscite (1925–26), to the Saar Plebiscite Commission (1934–35), to the American observers of the Greek national elections (1945–46) and to the U.N. Plebiscite Commission to Jammu and Kashmir (1949). She lectured briefly at Wellesley College and also taught at the Geneva Graduate Institute in 1935. During World War II she was a consultant to the director of the enemy branch of the Foreign Economic Administration. She held an honorary doctorate from the University of Geneva. She was elected a Fellow of the American Academy of Arts and Sciences in 1944. She died in Cambridge, Massachusetts on November 12, 1955.

== Select publications ==
- A Monograph on Plebiscites: With a Collection of Official Documents, Oxford University Press (1920)
- Plebiscites Since the World War: With a Collection of Official Documents, University of California (1933)
- The Saar Plebiscite: With a Collection of Official Documents, Harvard University Press (1940)
