= Josef Bürckel =

German Nazi politician, Gauleiter of Vienna (1895–1944)

Joseph Bürckel
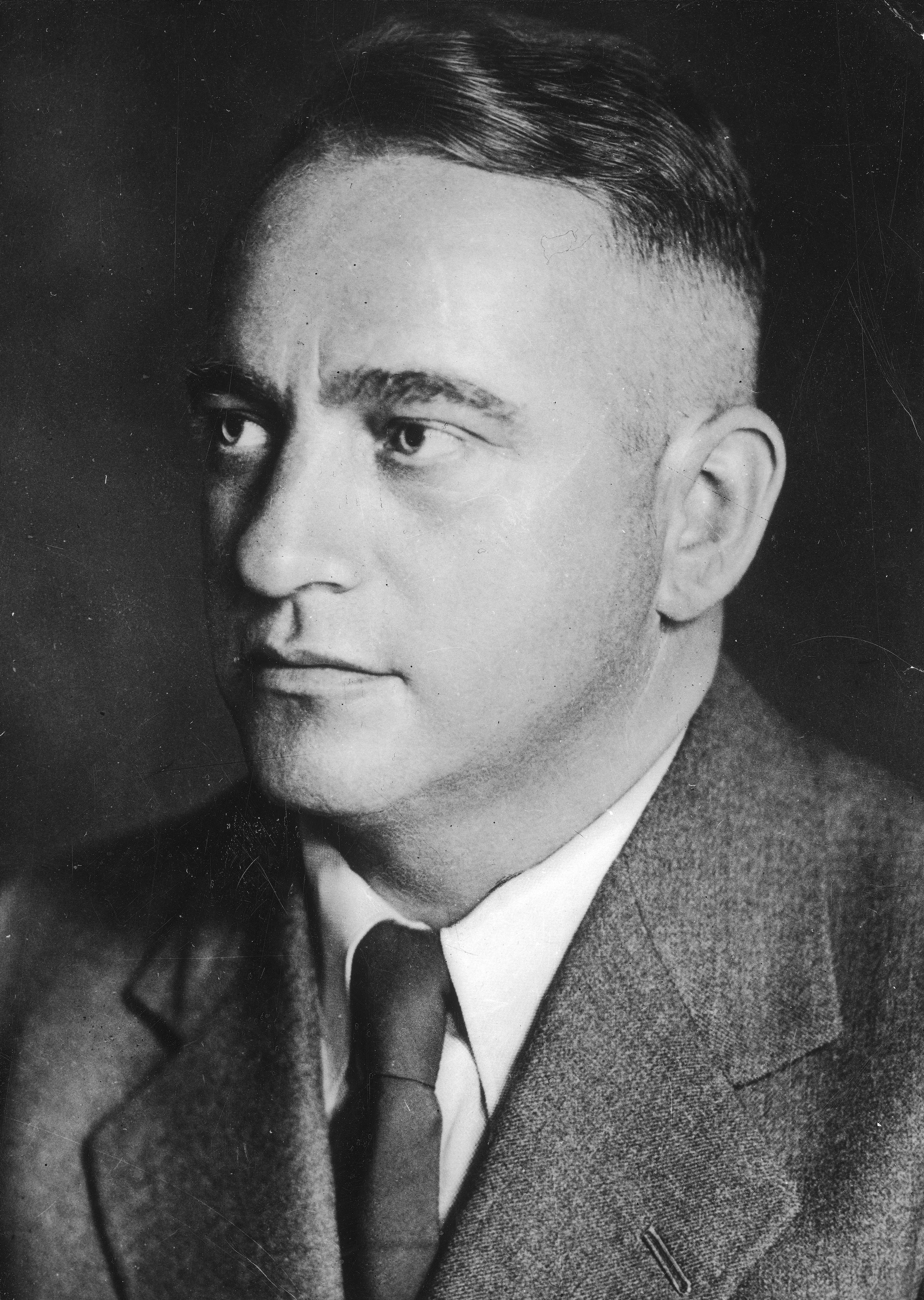
- Bürckel, c. 1938

Reich Commissioner of Austria
- In office 23 April 1938 – 31 March 1940
- Leader: Adolf Hitler
- Reichsstatthalter: Arthur Seyss-Inquart
- Preceded by: Office established
- Succeeded by: Office abolished

Reichsstatthalter of Reichsgau Vienna
- In office 1 April 1940 – 2 August 1940
- Leader: Adolf Hitler
- Preceded by: Office established
- Succeeded by: Baldur von Schirach

Gauleiter of Reichsgau Vienna
- In office 30 January 1939 – 2 August 1940
- Preceded by: Odilo Globocnik
- Succeeded by: Baldur von Schirach

Gauleiter of Gau Westmark
- In office 13 March 1926 – 28 September 1944
- Preceded by: Friedrich Wambsganss
- Succeeded by: Willi Stöhr

Reichsstatthalter of Westmark
- In office 11 March 1941 – 28 September 1944
- Preceded by: Office established
- Succeeded by: Willi Stöhr

Chief of Civil Administration for Lorraine
- In office 2 August 1940 – 28 September 1944
- Preceded by: Office established
- Succeeded by: Willi Stöhr

Member of the German Reichstag
- In office 14 September 1930 – 28 September 1944

Personal details
- Born: 30 March 1895 Lingenfeld, Kingdom of Bavaria, German Empire
- Died: 28 September 1944 (aged 49) Neustadt an der Weinstraße, Nazi Germany
- Party: Nazi Party
- Occupation: Teacher

Military service
- Allegiance: German Empire
- Branch/service: Imperial German Army
- Years of service: 1914–1916
- Unit: Bavarian Field Artillery Regiment 12
- Battles/wars: World War I

Joseph Bürckel (30 March 1895 – 28 September 1944) was a German Nazi politician and a member of the German parliament (the Reichstag). He was an early member of the Nazi Party and was influential in the rise of the National Socialist movement. He played a central role in the German acquisition of the Saarland and Austria. He held the posts of Gauleiter and Reichsstatthalter in both Gau Westmark and Reichsgau Vienna. He also held the rank of Obergruppenführer in both the SA and the SS.

== Life and career ==
Joseph Bürckel was born in Lingenfeld, in the Bavarian Palatinate (German: Rheinpfalz) as the son of a baker. From 1909 to 1914 he studied to become a teacher in Speyer.

Bürckel volunteered for service with Bavarian Field Artillery Regiment 12 in the First World War. He served with several different field artillery regiments and was honorably discharged in May 1916. After the war, he continued his training as a teacher and graduated in 1920. He was employed as a teacher, and eventually as a headmaster, until September 1930 when he was elected to the Reichstag. He represented electoral constituency 27 (Pfalz; after 1935, Rhinepfalz-Saar). He was reelected at subsequent elections and retained his seat until his death.

From 1921 onwards, Bürckel was engaged in nationalist groups fighting separatism in the Palatinate. An energetic organizer in the National Socialist movement of the Bavarian Palatinate from 1925, he rose through the ranks to become Gauleiter (Nazi Party leader) of Gau Rheinpfalz in March 1926, succeeding Friedrich Wambsganss. After the Saar plebiscite in January 1935 approved the return of the Saarland to Germany, Bürckel was named "Reichskommissar for the Return of the Saarland" to coordinate the acquisition. Gau Rheinpfalz was merged with the Saarland on 1 March 1935 to form Gau Pfalz-Saar (renamed Gau Saarpfalz in January 1936) and Bürckel continued as Gauleiter of the enlarged territory.

In February 1938, Bürckel (while remaining Gauleiter in Saarpfalz) was appointed the acting head of the Nazi Party for Austria, and on 13 March 1938, he was assigned to carry out the plebiscite on the Anschluss, Germany's absorption of Austria. From 23 April 1938 to 31 March 1940, he worked as "Reichskommissar for the Reunification of Austria with the German Reich" and was in charge of fully integrating it politically, economically and culturally into Germany as the Ostmark. He declared: "This is a revolution. The Jews may be glad that it is not of the French or Russian pattern". Saying that Vienna was "overfilled with Jews", he stated his aim to leave them with no more than five percent of their property. On 20 August 1938, he established the Central Agency for Jewish Emigration in Vienna, which was responsible at first for the forced emigration of Jews and later for the subsequent deportation and murder of at least 48,767 Austrian Jews out of Vienna.

While remaining Reichskommissar, Bürckel succeeded Odilo Globočnik as Nazi Party Gauleiter of Reichsgau Vienna from 30 January 1939 until 2 August 1940. With the outbreak of the Second World War in Europe on 1 September 1939, Bürckel was named as Reich Defense Commissioner for Wehrkreis (Military District) XVII which included his Reichsgau Vienna as well as Reichsgau Lower Danube, Reichsgau Upper Danube and part of Reichsgau Sudetenland.

On 1 April 1940, he ended his work as Reichskommissar and was named the Reichsstatthalter (Reich Governor) of Reichsgau Vienna, thus uniting under his control the highest party and governmental offices in his jurisdiction. Throughout that period, Bürckel continued working to further unification with Nazi Germany and to drive out the Jewish population through propaganda, anti-Jewish decrees and seizures of Jewish property. He also crushed Social Democrat and Communist resistance networks. His brutal methods were known as the "Vienna model" or "Bürckel model". Hitler wanted someone who would "work with radical resoluteness and without Viennese botchery", "even at risk of making himself unpopular". He was indeed unpopular, with Josef Goebbels writing, "Bürckel is making bad mistakes here in Vienna. A little Palatinate schoolmaster as the successor to the Habsburgs. That's not enough. The people here are a little unhappy. And rightly so". Goebbels also wrote Bürckel "left without a single friend in Vienna". Lois Weinberger, a vice-mayor of Vienna, later wrote, "This man was completely foreign to us in blood and mind. His ways and even his voice were also completely repugnant to us".

While Bürckel pursued corrupt officials, he also frequently embezzled confiscated money and property, instead of turning it over to the state. That earned him the displeasure of the Nazi hierarchy, and he was removed from his posts in Vienna in August 1940 and was succeeded by Baldur von Schirach. Upon his return to Gau Saarpfalz, Bürckel continued his previous lifestyle and spent large sums on purchasing artworks.

After the fall of France, in addition to his post as Gauleiter in Saarpfalz, Bürckel was appointed Chief of Civil Administration in occupied Lothringen on 7 August 1940. The Gau was reorganized and renamed Gau Westmark on 7 December 1940. It now consisted of the Bavarian Palatinate, the Saarland and the annexed département of Moselle. On 11 March 1941, Bürckel was named Reichsstatthalter of the new entity, again attaining full control over Party and governmental functions. On 16 November 1942, Bürckel was named Reich Defense Commissioner for Gau Westmark.

On 25 September 1933, Bürckel was granted the rank of SA-Gruppenführer in the Nazi paramilitary Sturmabteilung (SA) and was attached to the staff of SA-Gruppe Westmark. On 9 November 1936, he was promoted to SA-Obergruppenführer. From 9 November 1937, he also held the rank of Gruppenführer in the Schutzstaffel (SS) and was on the staff of the Reichsführer-SS, Heinrich Himmler. On 30 January 1942, he was promoted to SS-Obergruppenführer.

== Death ==
Bürckel died at about 11:04 a.m. in Neustadt an der Weinstrasse on 28 September 1944. A report, dated 28 September, from Bürckel's personal physician since 1936, Dr. Ewig stated that Bürckel was physically and mentally worn out and spent all of his time at work because of the deteriorating situation in his Gau. Bürckel suffered an inflammation of the intestine with diarrhoea, eventually becoming too ill to continue. Ewig was called in on 26 September 1944. Bürckel soon contracted pneumonia and blood failure (hypovolemic shock). Josef Rowies, another physician, stated on 23 October 1944 that the report of Bürckel's death sent to the SS-Personalhauptamt, the personnel records office, by Himmler's personal staff office on 9 October 1944 had been "doctored" to conceal his mental breakdown. On 8 September 1944, in a letter to Martin Bormann (with whom Bürckel did not get along), Bürckel opined that the lack of combat-ready troops to occupy the defensive line of the Moselle from the boundary of Gau Westmark via the arsenal of Metz-Diedenhofen, south of Saint-Avold (part of the Maginot Line), to Sarralbe made construction of defensive positions useless. Bormann responded by dispatching Willi Stöhr, who was to succeed Bürckel after his death, to oversee the construction work.

On 3 October 1944, Hitler posthumously awarded Bürckel the German Order, the highest decoration that the party could bestow on an individual, for his services to the Reich.

== Decorations and awards ==
- The Honour Cross of the World War 1914/1918 with Swords, 1934
- Anschluss Medal, 1939
- Sudetenland Medal, 1939
- Clasp to the Sudetenland Medal, 1939
- Honour Chevron for the Old Guard
- German Order, 1944
