= Gau Westmark =

Administrative division of Nazi Germany

- Gau of Nazi Germany
- 1925–1945
- Flag Coat of arms

- Map of Nazi Germany showing its administrative subdivisions (Gaue and Reichsgaue).
- Capital: Neustadt an der Weinstraße (1926–1935); Saarbrücken (1935–1945)
- Government
- Gauleiter
  - 1925–1926: Friedrich Wambsganss
  - 1926–1944: Josef Bürckel
  - 1944–1945: Willi Stöhr
- History
  - Establishment: February 1925
  - Disestablishment: 8 May 1945
Preceded by
Free State of Bavaria (Weimar Republic)
Free State of Oldenburg
Territory of the Saar Basin
Moselle (department)
Succeeded by
Rheinland-Pfalz
Saar Protectorate
Moselle (department)
- Today part of: France; Germany

The Gau Westmark (English: Western March) was an administrative division of Nazi Germany from 1933 to 1945. From 1925 to 1933, it was a regional subdivision of the Nazi Party.

== History ==
The Nazi Gau (plural Gaue) system was established at a party conference on 22 May 1926 to improve administration of the party structure. From 1933 onwards, after the Nazi seizure of power, the Gaue increasingly replaced the states as administrative subdivisions in Germany.

The Gau had its origin in 1925 in Gau Rheinpfalz (English: 'Rhenish Palatinate'), comprising the Bavarian/Rhenish Palatinate – the exclave of Bavaria left (west) of the river Rhine, which is now part of the modern state of Rhineland-Palatinate (see also: Palatinate region). With the return of the Saar Basin to Germany on 1 March 1935, the two regions were merged and formed the new Gau Pfalz-Saar. This Gau was renamed Gau Saarpfalz (English: 'Saar-Palatinate') on 13 January 1936.

After the outbreak of the Second World War and the defeat of France in 1940, the French département of Moselle, renamed "CdZ-Gebiet Lothringen", was added to the Gau on 30 November 1940. On 7 December 1940, it was again renamed Gau Westmark (English: 'Western March'). Gauleiter Bürckel hoped that Westmark would be extended as far as Germany's future western border, especially keeping in mind the ore region of Briey-Longwy in the département of Meurthe-et-Moselle. Bürckel further laid claims to parts of Alsace and even Baden. The Gau, however, remained as it was until the defeat of Germany in 1945.

At the head of each Gau stood a Gauleiter, a position which became increasingly more powerful, especially after the outbreak of the Second World War. Local Gauleiters were in charge of propaganda and surveillance and, from September 1944 onwards, the Volkssturm and the defence of the Gau.

The position of Gauleiter was held by Friedrich Wambsganss from February 1925 to 13 March 1926 and Josef Bürckel from 13 March 1926 until his death on 28 September 1944, when Willi Stöhr took over and served for the remaining duration of the Gau.
