= Georg Michalsen =

SS and Police Leader and SS-Sturmbannführer

- Born: Georg Michalczyk; 13 September 1906; Wendrin (today, Vendryně), Austrian Silesia, Austria-Hungary
- Died: 21 May 1993 (age 86); Hamburg, Germany
- Military career
- Allegiance: Nazi Germany
- Branch: Schutzstaffel
- Service years: 1932–1945
- Rank: SS-Sturmbannführer
- Commands: SS and Police Leader, "Trieste"
- Conflicts: World War II

Georg Wilhelm Johannes Michalsen (13 September 1906 – 21 May 1993) was a German SS-Sturmbannführer. During the Second World War, he was involved in the systematic deportation and murder of Polish Jews (Operation Reinhard) and later served as the SS and Police Leader in Trieste. Decades after the war, he was tried as an accomplice to murder, convicted and sentenced to twelve years in prison, though ultimately serving less than 5 years.

== Early life ==
Born Georg Michalczyk in Wendrin (today, Vendryně), then part of Austria-Hungary, he was the son of a primary school teacher and, from 1912 to 1920, attended school in Oppeln (today, Opole) then located in Germany. After serving an apprenticeship as an office assistant in a law firm in Oppeln, he worked as an accountant. Brought up with a strong belief in German nationalism, in 1924 he joined a Wehrverband, a völkische military association. On 1 November 1928, Michalczyk became a member of the Nazi Party (membership number 103,613). From 1930 he was the Party's Ortsgruppenleiter (Local Group Leader) in Oppeln. He also belonged to the Sturmabteilung (SA), the Nazi paramilitary organization. On 10 January 1932, he transferred from the SA to the Schutzstaffel (SS) (number 29,337). He served in the 45th SS-Standarte in Oppeln, was commissioned an SS-Untersturmführer on 9 November 1934 and promoted to SS-Obersturmführer on 30 January 1937.

== Second World War and Holocaust involvement ==
=== Poland ===
In September 1939 during the German attack on Poland, which launched the Second World War, Michalczyk was part of the SS force from Oppeln that marched into Częstochowa. In Poland, he led a 70-man SS unit that, in addition to guard duties, trained the "Volksdeutscher Selbstschutz" in Piotrków Trybunalski, as well as the Opoczno and Rawa districts. This paramilitary organization, made up of ethnic Germans living in Poland, was used as an auxiliary police force and involved in the deportation and murder of Jews and ethnic Poles. In 1940 Michalczyk, embarrassed by his Polish-sounding surname, officially changed it to Michalsen.

Initially, Michalsen was assigned to the staff of SS-Oberführer Fritz Katzmann, the SS and Police Leader (SSPF) in the Radom District of the General Government. In August 1940, he transferred to the staff of SS-Brigadeführer Odilo Globočnik, the SSPF of the Lublin District. Michalsen ran a camp for mainly Jewish forced laborers charged with building fortifications along the German-Soviet demarcation line. After the German attack on the Soviet Union, Globočnik was assigned to set up SS and police bases (Polizeistützpunkte) in the newly conquered areas of the Soviet Union and Michalsen was appointed head of the unit in Riga. Michalsen was present when the Riga Ghetto was partially cleared on 30 November 1941 and approximately 13,000 people were shot in the forest of Rumbula.

Michalsen was promoted to SS-Hauptsturmführer on 30 January 1942 and, in the early summer, returned to Lublin. At that time, following the Wannsee Conference, Globočnik was organizing Operation Reinhard, the systematic murder of all Polish Jews. In Treblinka, Belzec and Sobibor, extermination camps were set up for industrial-scale murder utilizing gas chambers. On 21 July 1942, a cadre of officials from Globočnik's office, including Michalsen, SS-Sturmbannführer Hermann Höfle and SS-Sturmbannführer Ernst Lerch arrived in Warsaw at the onset of the Grossaktion Warsaw, the expulsion of the Jews from the Warsaw Ghetto. Beginning on 27 July, approximately 7,000 Jews per day were transported by train for alleged "resettlement" to the east, however, the true destination of the deportations was the Treblinka extermination camp. During this time, Michalsen was deployed at the Umschlagplatz, where the victims boarded the transports. The deportations lasted until 21 September 1942, and it is estimated that around 265,000 Warsaw Jews were murdered in this fashion.

In addition to the operation in Warsaw, Michalsen, together with others in Lublin cadre, played a leading role in the evacuation of the ghettos in Otwock, Wołomin, Piaski, Międzyrzec Podlaski and Włodawa. During the final destruction of the Warsaw Ghetto in April and May 1943, Michalsen organized the relocation to a site in Lublin of the Többens and Schultz factories that employed thousands of forced laborers. By this time, Michalsen was considered one of the foremost SS experts in the liquidation of ghettos. Between August 16 and 23, 1943, Michalsen was involved in the liquidation of the Białystok Ghetto where at least 30,000 people were deported to Treblinka and Auschwitz. In recommending that Michalsen be promoted to SS-Sturmbannführer on 11 February 1945, Globočnik wrote: "M[ichalsen] took part in the R[einhard] operation in an independent and decisive manner and, for example, had a decisive influence on the heavy fighting in Warsaw, and also cleaned Bialystok in 5 days."

=== Italy ===
Following the armistice between Fascist Italy and the Allies, now SS-Gruppenführer Globočnik on 13 September 1943 was promoted to the newly created post of Higher SS and Police Leader (HSSPF) in the Operational Zone of the Adriatic Littoral, with headquarters in Trieste. He brought along several of his trusted underlings, including Michalsen, Höfle and Lerch. In Trieste, Michalsen worked in the HSSPF headquarters staff, as head of the personnel section. He was also involved in fighting partisans in Istria and led the SS and police forces in a number of Italian cities, first in Fiume (today, Rijeka), later in Pola (today, Pula). Finally, on 27 October 1944, he was officially given the post of SS and Polizeigebietkommandeur (Police Area Commander) in Trieste, which was the site of the Risiera di San Sabba, a concentration and transit camp where it is estimated that over 3,000 persons were killed.

== Post-war life and prosecution ==
After the end of the war in Europe, Michalsen was captured on 31 May 1945 together with Globočnik, Höfle and Lerch on an alpine pasture (Möslacher Alm) near the Weissensee Lake in Carinthia. In British captivity, he passed himself off as an ordinary soldier in the Waffen-SS. Released in 1948, he moved to Hamburg and resumed a career as an accountant. After being tracked down in a nationwide search by the Central War Crimes Commission, he was arrested on 24 January 1961. He was put on trial in Hamburg Regional Court on 5 December 1973 and, on 25 July 1974, was convicted of being an accomplice to murder and sentenced to twelve years in prison. On 22 May 1979, he was released from prison. He died in Hamburg on 21 May 1993.

== Sources ==
- Angrick, Andrej (2013). "Georg Michalsen: Handlungsreisender der Endlösung". In Mallmann, Klaus-Michael; Gerhard, Paul (eds.). Karrieren der Gewalt: Nationalsozialistische Täterbiographien. Darmstadt: Primus Verlag. ISBN 978-3-863-12364-2.
- Felton, Mark (2016). "Chapter 6: The Choiceless Choice". Holocaust Heroes: Resistance to Hitler's Final Solution. Pen and Sword. ISBN 978-1-473-88184-6.
- Klee, Ernst (2007). Das Personenlexikon zum Dritten Reich. Wer war was vor und nach 1945. Frankfurt-am-Main: Fischer-Taschenbuch-Verlag. ISBN 978-3-596-16048-8.
- Yerger, Mark C. (1997). Allgemeine-SS: The Commands, Units and Leaders of the General SS. Schiffer Publishing Ltd. ISBN 0-7643-0145-4.

== External websites ==
- Transfer of Factories from the Warsaw Ghetto: Georg Michalsen Testimony Retrieved 17 August 2022.
- Georg Michalsen in the Holocaust Historical Society Retrieved 19 August 2022.
