= Bruno Coceani =

Italian politician (1893–1978)

Prefect of Trieste
- In office 23 October 1943 – 30 April 1945
- Preceded by: Giuseppe Cocuzza
- Succeeded by: Allied military government
- Member of the Chamber of Fasces and Corporations
- In office 23 March 1939 – 5 August 1943
- Member of the Chamber of Deputies of the Kingdom of Italy
- In office 28 April 1934 – 2 March 1939

Federal Secretary of the National Fascist Party of Trieste

Secretary of the Fascist Industrial Union of the Julian March

Personal details
- Born: 17 December 1893 Monfalcone, Austro-Hungarian Empire
- Died: 16 December 1978 (aged 84) Trieste, Italy
- Party: Italian Nationalist Association; National Fascist Party; Republican Fascist Party

Military service
- Allegiance: Kingdom of Italy
- Branch/service: Royal Italian Army
- Rank: Major
- Battles/wars: World War I; Battles of the Isonzo; World War II; Greco-Italian War

Bruno Coceani, born Bruno Coceancig (Monfalcone, 17 December 1893 – Trieste, 16 December 1978) was an Italian Fascist politician, prefect of Trieste during the Italian Social Republic.

== Biography ==
=== Early life and interwar years ===
Born in Monfalcone, then part of the Austro-Hungarian Empire, he moved to Trieste with his family when he was only ten years old. In the Julian capital he completed his secondary school studies; in 1911 he began attending the University of Vienna, but in 1912 he moved to the University of Florence in Italy and later to the University of Padua, where he graduated in literature in 1917 and where he met irredentist leader Cesare Battisti. Being an irredentist himself, in May 1915, he volunteered as an officer in the Royal Italian Army, receiving his baptism of fire on Mount Podgora in the summer of that same year. He participated in the fighting both on the Karst Plateau and on the Trentino front, earning a War Cross for Military Valor and being promoted to captain at the unusually young age of twenty-four, in the last months of the war.

After the end of the war, he returned to Trieste, now part of Italy, where he taught at the "Petrarca" high school until 1925; in the same years, he joined the anti-Bolshevik committees and participated in D’Annunzio's occupation of Fiume. From 1920 to 1923, he was president of the Trieste section of the Italian Nationalist Association, and when the nationalist movement was merged with the National Fascist Party, Coceani was immediately appointed federal secretary of the PNF for Trieste, with the support of Francesco Giunta and Fulvio Suvich. He aligned himself with the moderate faction, linked to economic groups and the liberal-national party, and in 1926 he became secretary of the Fascist Industrial Union of Venezia Giulia, becoming the point of reference between the industrialists of the region and the PNF.

Between 1924 and 1927, he did not carry out significant political activity, dedicating himself to teaching literature at the Francesco Petrarca Lyceum of Trieste and becoming dean of the local folk high school. In 1927, he was appointed Podestà of Monfalcone, a post he held until 1934, when he was elected to the Italian Chamber of Deputies. In 1928, he had his original surname, Coceancig, Italianized as Coceani at his request. In 1937, he became president of the Trieste section of the National Institute of Fascist Culture, and in 1939, he became National Councillor at the Chamber of Fasces and Corporations. In 1931, he also founded the magazine La Porta Orientale, aligned with irredentist and anti-slavic positions; after the promulgation of the Italian racial laws in 1938, it also hosted anti-Jewish articles.

=== World War II ===
At the beginning of the Second World War, Coceani volunteered to fight on the Albanian front, with the rank of major. He later returned to Trieste, where he resided for the rest of the war, making numerous trips to Rome, Venice and Milan. After the fall of Fascism on 25 July 1943, he occasionally continued to go to his office of the Industrial Union, while undergoing the blocking of current accounts and a house search ordered by the new authorities who had settled in Trieste on behalf of the Badoglio government. In the same days, together with other members of the "Julian and Dalmatian Volunteer Company", he studied the possibility of making the association a nucleus of citizens that, outside the parties, would constitute a national bloc willing to take up arms to continue fighting in defense of the Italianity of the Julian March.

Less than a week after the Armistice of Cassibile in September 1943, Trieste was occupied by German troops and placed, together with the rest of the Julian March, the province of Udine and the Province of Ljubljana, under the direct control of the Carinthian gauleiter Friedrich Rainer, as Operational Zone of the Adriatic Littoral. On 23 October 1943, under pressure from the Provincial Union of Industrialists, Rainer he appointed Coceani prefect of the province of Trieste, with authority over the other prefects of the region (with the exception of the Province of Ljubljana, which, while continuing to be formally Italian territory, was placed under the presidency of the Slovenian general Leon Rupnik). Throughout the region, the Germans exploited the contrasts between Slavs and Italians according to a divide and rule policy; in the villages around Trieste, with a Slavic majority, some Slovenian and Croatian schools were reopened, and the free circulation of newspapers from Ljubljana was allowed. Even some German magazines such as the Deutsche Adria-Zeitung came out in bilingual Italian and Slovenian editions in Friuli and Italian and Croatian in Istria and Dalmatia, and numerous Slavic employees were hired in the public administration. Coceani, as the leader of the local Italian nationalists, repeatedly protested with the German authorities, and especially with SS General Odilo Globocnik, whom he considered to be the real originator of these policies, effectively ruling over Rainer. He also repeatedly clashed with Colonel Koka's Slovene Home Guard. Coceani favoured Italian magazines, especially those that referred to the anti-Austrian irredentist tradition, while rejecting requests to authorise similar publications by the Slovene minority; only some radio programs in Slovenian language were allowed.

In January 1944, following the joint pressure of Coceani and of the podestà of Trieste Cesare Pagnini, the Germans authorized the recruitment of a civic guard made up exclusively of Italian volunteers, trained by SS officers and structured as a municipal police under the command of Pagnini, who assumed the rank of colonel; its area of employment was limited to Trieste, although smaller detachments were later created in other municipalities. The task of this Civic Guard was initially the recovery of the weapons abandoned by the Royal Italian Army after the armistice, but Coceani and Pagnini planned to use it for the protection of the city from the Yugoslav partisans, even in collaboration, if possible, with the local Committee of National Liberation. Coceani also obtained permission from the German authorities to set up a unit of the Guardia di Finanza under the command of General Filippo Fiocca, operating throughout the territory of the province of Trieste, and pressured the Italian Social Republic to send more Italian troops.

In the night between 29 and 30 April 1945, as the Yugoslav People's Liberation Army was penetrating into the outskirts of Trieste, the local Committee for National Liberation started an uprising against the German occupiers. In the previous days Coceani had proposed to Cesare Pagnini and, through the latter, to Carlo Schiffrer, one of the main leaders of the local CLN, to unite all the Italian forces in an anti-Yugoslav function in an attempt to try to stem the advance of Tito's forces, thus allowing the Western Allies to precede them in the occupation of Trieste. A few years later Coceani would write that Mussolini himself had given him the order to act in this sense: "The order given by the Duce was to make contact with the exponents of the liberation committee, with all the Italian parties, even with the Communists, in order to create a bloc of the Italian forces against the annexationist designs of the Slavs." On April 4, 1945, Coceani had asked Mussolini for support in the defence of Trieste, and for the same purpose, he had sent emissaries to Rome in order to contact the royalist government in the south in an attempt to obtain help for the defence of the eastern border. Admiral Raffaele de Courten, Chief of Staff of the Italian Co-belligerent Navy, had answered positively, and a landing by forces of the Regia Marina, with the support of the Decima Flottiglia MAS and of other RSI troops, had been planned, with or without Allied intervention; the plan however failed due to British opposition made this plan fail. On 10 April, the mayor Pagnini held an organisational meeting of five hundred Italians in the town hall, with the aim of uniting all Italian forces, avoiding attacks on the Germans, who, as long as they defended the city against the Yugoslavs, were to be considered allies – and transfer all powers to the CLN when the Germans left. It was decided that the 1,800 men of the Civic Guard would have also passed under the command of the CLN.

On 28 April, Bruno Sambo, head of the local PFR, handed over the arms of the fascist party to Coceani's public health committee, and agreed to replace the party insignia with tricolour ribbons; that same evening, some Italian police units came out on the streets with the tricolour ribbons, but were quickly disarmed by the Germans. In the meantime, however, after lengthy discussions, the local CLN decided to reject Coceani's proposals to join forces against the Yugoslavs and decided to act against the Germans. On the night between 29 and 30 April, all German troops in Trieste received the order from Odilo Globočnik to withdraw towards Tolmezzo; Coceani informed CLN representative Ercole Miani of this, and on the next morning, the National Liberation Committee proclaimed a general insurrection against the Germans. Coceani resigned, and the CLN assumed all powers after clashes against the remaining German and Fascist troops, but on the following day, the city was occupied by Tito's army. On April 30, when the Yugoslavs entered the city, Coceani left Trieste and took refuge in a friend's house.

=== Later years ===
While still in hiding, in 1946 Coceani was convicted of collaborationism, but the following year the Court of Assize of Trieste absolved him of this accusation. He then settled in Rome, writing in Giuseppe Bottai's magazine Abc, later moving to Milan in the 1950s. In 1955, he was appointed administrative director of the economic newspaper Il Sole, which nine years later would merge with another economic-financial newspaper, 24 ore, giving life to Il Sole 24 ore. Before this merger, in 1963, Coceani had left the post due to having reached the age limit. In the last years of his life, he devoted himself entirely to historical studies, memorials and journalism (he continued to write for La Porta Orientale until 1973). He died in Trieste in 1978.
