= Nerina De Walderstein =

Member of Italian resistance against the Nazis

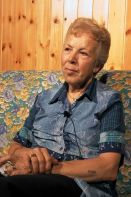
Nerina De Walderstein

Nerina De Walderstein (1925–2011) was an Italian partisan, who survived the Auschwitz concentration camp. After the war, she continued to speak and teach publicly about the concentration camps and her experience. She was born and died in Trieste.

== Biography ==
De Walderstein came from a family of militant antifascists and joined the Italian Resistance at a young age.

Together with her brother, she was a part of the Venetian section of Gruppi di Azione Patriottica. On March 23, 1944, she was arrested in Trieste and imprisoned in the Villa Triste, where she was interrogated and tortured by Nazis. Afterwards, she was brought to Jesuit prisons and one in Coroneo, where she underwent further torture.

On June 21, 1944, she was deported to the Auschwitz concentration camp and was given the identification number of 82132.

After she was taken to Auschwitz–Birkenau, she was transferred to the Flossenbürg concentration camp on October 10, 1944, and finally to an OSRAM lightbulb factory at Plauen. Before leaving Flossenbürg, De Walderstein defended two little girls from the SS: one of the officers struck her with the butt of his rifle.

The lightbulb factory was eventually bombed by the Allies, and De Walderstein and her companions were freed. Together with a group of survivors, she fled from a sorting camp and returned to Italy without assistance.

She was only able to reach Italy, however, in the summer of 1946, while Trieste was in the course of determining its status under Anglo-American government. Debilitated from the camps, De Walderstein left the house for air found herself in a parade. Seeing her, the civil police of the Allied military government arrested her and kept her in prison for one month.

After the 1950s, De Walderstein was active in testifying about the deportations and deaths in Germany, above all to the young. Before she became sick, she dedicated her last years making trips to schools across Italy to speak with students about her experience and to promote antifascist values.

In 1952, De Walderstein stole ashes from the crematorium of Birkenau, which are today found in the museum of Risiera di San Sabba in Trieste.

== Bibliography ==
- Gabriella Nocentini, Tutto questo va detto: la deportazione di Maria Rudolf, Nuova dimensione, 2008, ISBN 9788889100554
- "Men and Women of the Resistance", produced by the Associazione Nazionale Partigiani d'Italia, published under the Creative Commons CC-BY-3.0 I
- Works related to it:Donne e Uomini della Resistenza/Nerina De Walderstein at Wikisource
