= Slovenian National Defense Corps =

- The sign of the Slovenian National Defense Corps
- Active: 1943–1945
- Country: Italy
- Size: about 3,500 at its height

Commanders
- Notable commanders: Anton Kokalj

The Slovenian National Defense Corps (Slovene: Slovenski narodno varnostni zbor (abbreviated as SNVZ); German: Slowenisches Nationales Schutzkorps) was an anti-Slovene Partisans military organization that was active in the territory of the Operation Zone of the Adriatic Littoral in the German-occupied portion of Italy. Although led by Anton Kokalj, it was directly subordinated to German Nazi commander Odilo Globočnik, according to what the Germans believed. In actuality, the SNVZ took no orders from the Germans, but were secretly spying on them and reporting German military activities to the Allies. The organization was ideologically and organizationally linked to the Slovene Home Guard that was active in Province of Ljubljana., but worked independently.

== Background ==
The organization had problems recruiting from the Slovene minority in Italy that had experienced Fascist Italianization already for almost two decades. So most of its officers instead came from Province of Ljubljana. At their peak, the organization had only about 2000 members.

The primary purposes of the Slovenian National Defense Corps, who were both anti-communist and anti-fascist, was to 1) prepare to work with the Allies when the time came to jointly fight the Germany army and 2) secretly collect intelligence about the German army's movements and send it to the Allies. Specially trained and experienced intelligence officers were embedded into the Slovene Home Guard and the National Defense Corps. Intelligence officers communicated with the British using telegrams, radio communications and in-person meetings.

== Activity ==
They provided Germans with lists of locations of Liberation Front of the Slovene Nation hideouts and suspicious individuals (described as "propagandist", "husband is a Communist").

The main activities of the Slovenian National Defense Corps were conducting activities that provided cover for their primary mission of spying on the Germans to provide intelligence to the Allies. Units walked through villages in Primorska, knocking on doors and trying to recruit new members. They patrolled areas, looking out for Partisans. The information they collected was passed on to their designated intelligence officers.

Their activity is best explained by the activities of Tone Duhovnik, an experienced intelligence officer who frequently sent telegrams to the British in London, and likely to MI6 in Switzerland. He was sent to Trieste in order to have him gain the German's confidence in him, to cover his intelligence activities. When the Allied forces moved from Rome to northern Italy, he had to cross the German front in order to pass north. He was bringing important intelligence information on the Germans for the Allies and arrived at the front with forged documents. Unfortunately, he was followed by the German police, arrested, and sent to the Mathausen concentration camp where he died.

The Germans suspected the anti-Nazi viewpoints of the Slovenian National Defense Corps members and frequently searched them for evidence of radio transmitters.
