= LXXXXVII Army Corps =

LXXXXVII Corps
- LXXXXVII. Armeekorps
- Area of operation
- Active: 28 September 1944 – 8 May 1945
- Country: Nazi Germany
- Branch: Army
- Size: Corps
- Engagements: World War II: Coastal Defence during the Italian campaign; Anti-partisan operations; Rijeka operation

Commanders
- Notable commanders: Ludwig Kübler

The LXXXXVII Army Corps (German: LXXXXVII. Armeekorps) was an army corps in the German army during World War II.

== History ==
The LXXXXVII (97th) Army Corps was created in Italy on 28 September 1944 by renaming the troops of the Operational Zone of the Adriatic Littoral.

The Corps' operational area extended from the Tagliamento River to Susak and Rijeka. The task of the Corps was to secure the northeastern Adriatic coast against an Allied invasion and to fight against partisans. The forces of the Corps were mainly concentrated in Gorizia (General Command), Trieste, Postojna and Rijeka (Fiume). In the area of the corps, the coast was fortified with artillery and a line of defense along the Ćićarija plateau between Trieste and Rijeka was formed. Until April 1945, the corps limited itself to fighting the guerrilla groups active in its section.

At the beginning of April 1945, the strong Yugoslav 4th Partisan Army advanced swiftly along the Dalmatian coast, heading towards Rijeka, and Trieste. In order to counteract this advance, the newly formed 188th Mountain Division was moved to the area in question. By April 25, 1945, strong Partisan units had advanced to the outskirts of Rijeka. After heavy fighting, the Corps surrendered to the Yugoslav Army in early May.

== Commanders ==
- General der Gebirgstruppe Ludwig Kübler, (28 September 1944 – 8 May 1945) (POW and executed on 18 August 1947).

== Area of operations ==
- Italy : September 1944 - April 1945
- Istria, April - May 1945

== See also ==
- List of German corps in World War II

== Source ==
- "LXXXXVII. Armeekorps z.b.V. (97.)". Lexikon der Wehrmacht.
