= Ernst Lerch =

Austrian SS officer (1914-1997)

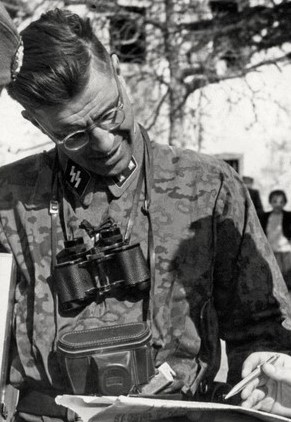
- Lerch c. March 1945.
- Born: 19 November 1914; Klagenfurt, Cisleithania, Austro-Hungarian Empire
- Died: 1997 (aged 82-83) Austria
- Allegiance: Nazi Germany
- Branch: Heer; Waffen-SS
- Service years: 1938-1945
- Rank: SS-Sturmbannführer
- Conflicts: World War II; Invasion of Poland; Italian Civil War
- Other work: Hotelier

Ernst Lerch (19 November 1914 – 1997) was an Austrian-born Nazi officer said to be one of the most important men of Operation Reinhard (German: Aktion Reinhard), responsible for "Jewish affairs" and the mass murder of the Jews in the General Government (Generalgouvernement). However, he was never convicted of war crimes.

== Life and early career ==
Lerch was born on 19 November 1914 in Klagenfurt. He briefly studied at the Hochschule für Welthandel in Vienna. From 1931 to 1934 Lerch learned the hotel trade by working as a waiter in various hotels in Switzerland, France and Hungary. On 1 December 1932, Lerch joined the National Socialist German Workers Party (Nationalsozialistische Deutsche Arbeiterpartei, NSDAP) (Party Number 1,327,396). On 1 March 1934, he became a member of the "Protective Squadron" (German: Schutzstaffel, SS) (SS Number 309,700).

From 1934 until the incorporation of Austria into Germany (Anschluss) in 1938, Lerch was employed in his father's Café Lerch. The café, located in Klagenfurt, became a meeting place for Nazis such as Odilo Globočnik and Ernst Kaltenbrunner, who frequented the café. While still in Austria, Lerch was promoted to an SS-Second Lieutenant (Untersturmführer) on 9 September 1936. By 1937, he was promoted to an SS-First Lieutenant (Obersturmführer). In 1938, Lerch moved to Berlin.

In Berlin he became an SS-Captain (Hauptsturmführer) in the Reich Security Directorate on 12 March 1938. At his wedding to a "Secret State Police" (Gestapo) employee, Oswald Pohl and Globočnik acted as witnesses.

== Activities in Poland ==
In December 1938, Lerch joined the German Army. According to his testimony, he was involved in the 1939 Polish Campaign as a signals corporal. From February 1940 until September 1941, Lerch was employed at the "Reich Security Main Office" (Reichssicherheitshauptamt, RSHA) in Berlin. Then he was appointed as Rasse-und Siedlungsführer in Kraków.

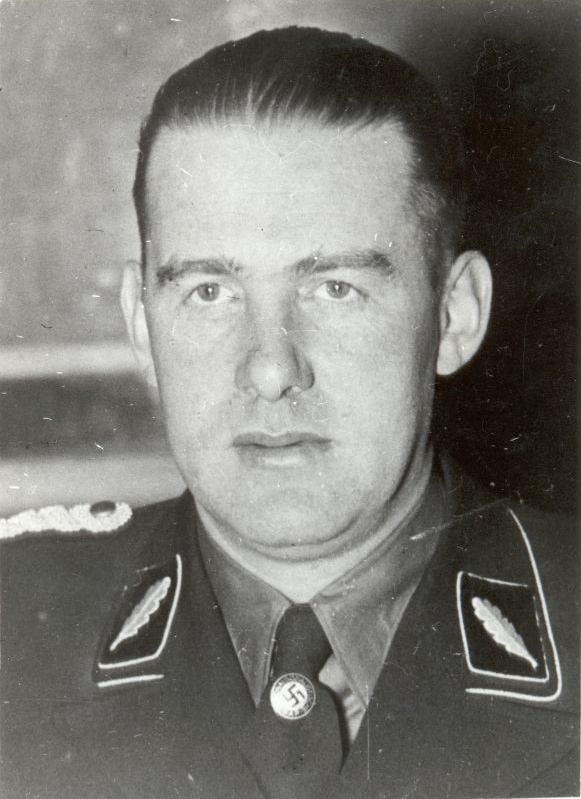
SS and Police Leader Odilo Globočnik in charge of Operation Reinhard

From 1941 to 1943, Lerch served in Lublin as chief of Globočnik's personal office and Stabsführer der Allgemeine SS, responsible for the radio link between the Aktion Reinhard headquarters and Berlin. On 21 July 1942, he was promoted to SS-Sturmbannführer. At the trial of Hermann Worthoff (former Gestapo chief in Lublin) after the war, it was mentioned that Lerch had overseen the murder of thousands of Jews from the Majdan Tatarski ghetto in Lublin at the nearby Krepiec Forest.

When Operation Reinhard (Aktion Reinhard) was finished, Lerch was ordered to Italy in September 1943. He went with most of the SS-men of Globočnik's staff. In Trieste, Lerch continued to serve as chief of Globočnik's personal staff in the OZAK (Operationszone Adriatisches Küstenland). He was still Globočnik's right hand but had also military-related tasks. Lerch was very much involved in anti-partisan operations. For a few weeks, Lerch was provisional police commander in Fiume.

== After the war ==
After the German surrender in Italy (1 May 1945), Lerch fled to Carinthia in southern Austria, a region he knew well. There, at an alpine pasture (Möslacher Alm) near the Weissensee Lake, he was captured by a British commando on 31 May 1945. Lerch was captured with Globočnik, Hermann Höfle and Georg Michalsen.

Being imprisoned in Wolfsberg detention centre, Lerch was interrogated by the British. He insisted on having spent just a short time in Lublin, and had nothing to do either with Globočnik or the mass killings of Jews in Poland. Lerch escaped from prison and lived in hiding from 1947 to 1950. He was captured again in 1950.

In 1960, Lerch was sentenced to two years of imprisonment by a court in Wiesbaden (8JS 1145/60 StA Wiesbaden). In 1971, he was accused again of being involved in the Holocaust. The trial was held in Klagenfurt. His case was finally dropped on 11 May 1976 because the lack of witnesses (LG Klagenfurt: 25VR 3123/71).

In 1980, Israeli intelligence made plans to assassinate Lerch. The Mossad planned to attach an explosive device to his car from a moving motorcycle and detonate it later. The never-implemented plan became known in 2018 after former Mossad agent Yossi Chen published documents on the operation. The Mossad had also planned to assassinate Franz Murer, who had been known as the "Butcher of Vilnius". Neither assassinations were carried out since the new Mossad chief, Yitzhak Hofi, feared that attacks on Austrian soil would endanger relations.
