= Ludwig Kübler =

German Lieutenant General during World War II

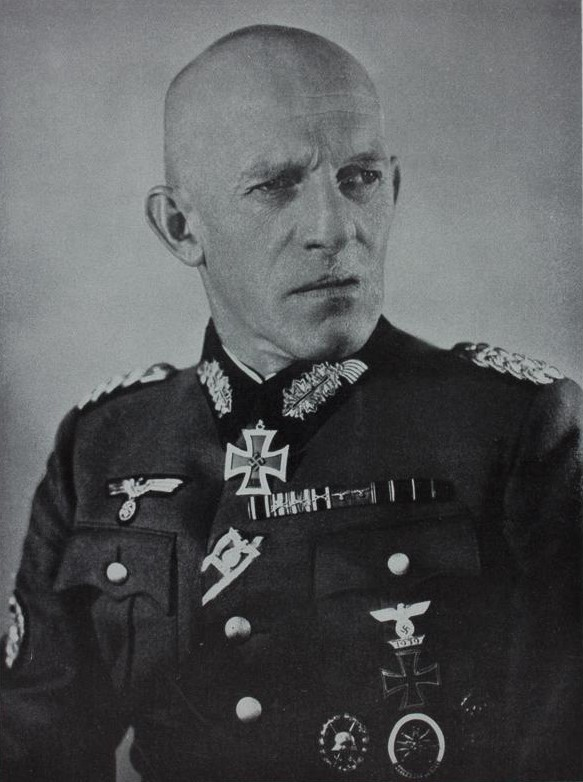
- Born: 2 September 1889; Munich, Kingdom of Bavaria
- Died: 18 August 1947 (aged 57); Ljubljana, PR Slovenia, FPR Yugoslavia
- Cause of death: Execution by hanging
- Military career
- Allegiance: German Empire; Weimar Republic; Nazi Germany
- Branch: German Army
- Service years: 1908–1945
- Rank: General der Gebirgstruppe
- Commands: 1st Mountain Division; XXXXIX Mountain Corps; Army Group Centre Rear Area; 4th Army; LXXXXVII Army Corps
- Conflicts: World War I World War II
- Awards: Knight's Cross of the Iron Cross

Signature
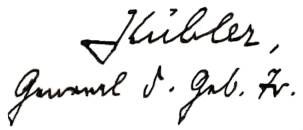

Ludwig Kübler (2 September 1889 – 18 August 1947) was a German General der Gebirgstruppe (Lieutenant General) who commanded the 1st Mountain Division, XXXXIX Mountain Corps, 4th Army and the Operational Zone of the Adriatic Littoral during World War II. He was awarded the Knight's Cross of the Iron Cross for his actions commanding the 1st Mountain Division during the invasion of Poland in 1939. He also commanded the division during the invasion of France and the Low Countries. As commander of the XXXXIX Mountain Corps, he took part in the invasion of Yugoslavia and the attack on the Soviet Union. In December 1941 he was appointed to command the 4th Army, but was dismissed from this post in January of the following year, and placed in the Führerreserve des Heeres (senior officer reserve pool). In July 1943 he was appointed as the commanding general of the Army Group Centre Rear Area on the Eastern Front; in October 1943 he was appointed to command the Operational Zone of the Adriatic Littoral, based in Trieste on the northern Adriatic coast. After being captured by Yugoslav forces at the end of the war, he was tried and executed for war crimes.

== Early life ==
Kübler was born on 2 September 1889 in Unterdill (now Munich) in the Kingdom of Bavaria. His father was the physician Wilhelm Kübler and he had six brothers and two sisters. In 1895 he enrolled in elementary school in Forstenried which he left after three years, he then attended the Gymnasium in Rosenheim and the humanist Ludwig Gymnasium in Munich. He graduated in 1908 with top grades and turned down a place at the prestigious Maximilianeum for a career in the military. On 20 July 1908, he joined the 15th Royal Bavarian Infantry Regiment "King Friedrich August of Saxony" as a cadet. At the time, the regiment was garrisoned at Neuburg an der Donau. On 26 October of that year, he was appointed as a Fahnenjunker-Unteroffizier (cadet non-commissioned officer). From 1 October 1909 until 14 October 1910 he attended the War School (German: Kriegsschule) in Munich, at which he was placed fifth out of 166 students in his year. On 23 October 1910, he was commissioned as a Leutnant. On 15 January 1913 he was posted to the machine gun company of the 3rd Royal Bavarian Infantry Regiment "Prince Karl of Bavaria", then conducted riding training with the 4th Royal Bavarian Chevaulegers Regiment. He spent February and March 1913 conducting machine gun training courses in the field, before taking command of the machine gun company of the 15th Royal Bavarian Infantry Regiment on 1 April.

== World War I and the interwar period ==
At the beginning of World War I, Kübler was serving with 15th Bavarian Infantry Regiment, on the Western Front. He was involved in September 1914 fighting in Lorraine and around St Quentin as commander of a machine gun platoon. On 16 September he was awarded the Iron Cross 2nd class. On 21 September he was appointed as the regimental adjutant. On 24 September a serious injury from shell splinters left a conspicuous large scar on his face. Although the injury had not completely healed he returned on 13 January 1915 to his regiment, which took part in the Battle of the Somme. While recuperating, on 17 November he was awarded the Iron Cross 1st class. On 9 July 1915 he was promoted to Oberleutnant, and on 18 August 1918 he was promoted to the rank of Hauptmann.

After the war he was retained in the Reichswehr. He was then a staff officer in the Army Department (T1) of Truppenamt for a few years. From 1925 to 1926 he was at the General Staff of Group Command 1 in Berlin. He was promoted to the rank of Major on 1 August 1928, and Oberstleutnant on 1 April 1932. On 1 November 1933 he was appointed as the chief of staff of the 7th Division based in Munich, and after transferring to the newly created Wehrmacht, he was promoted to the rank of Oberst on 1 July 1934. This was followed by his appointment on 1 October 1934 as the chief of staff of Wehrkreis VII, the Bavarian military district centred on Munich. He was promoted to Generalmajor on 1 January 1938, and exactly three months later was appointed to command the 1st Mountain Division. The 1st Mountain Division was raised from Wehrkreis VII, with its garrison centred on Garmisch-Partenkirchen. It was recruited from Bavarians, with some Austrians included, and was formed on 9 April 1938. Considerably stronger than most German divisions, it had three mountain infantry regiments rather than two.

== Second World War ==
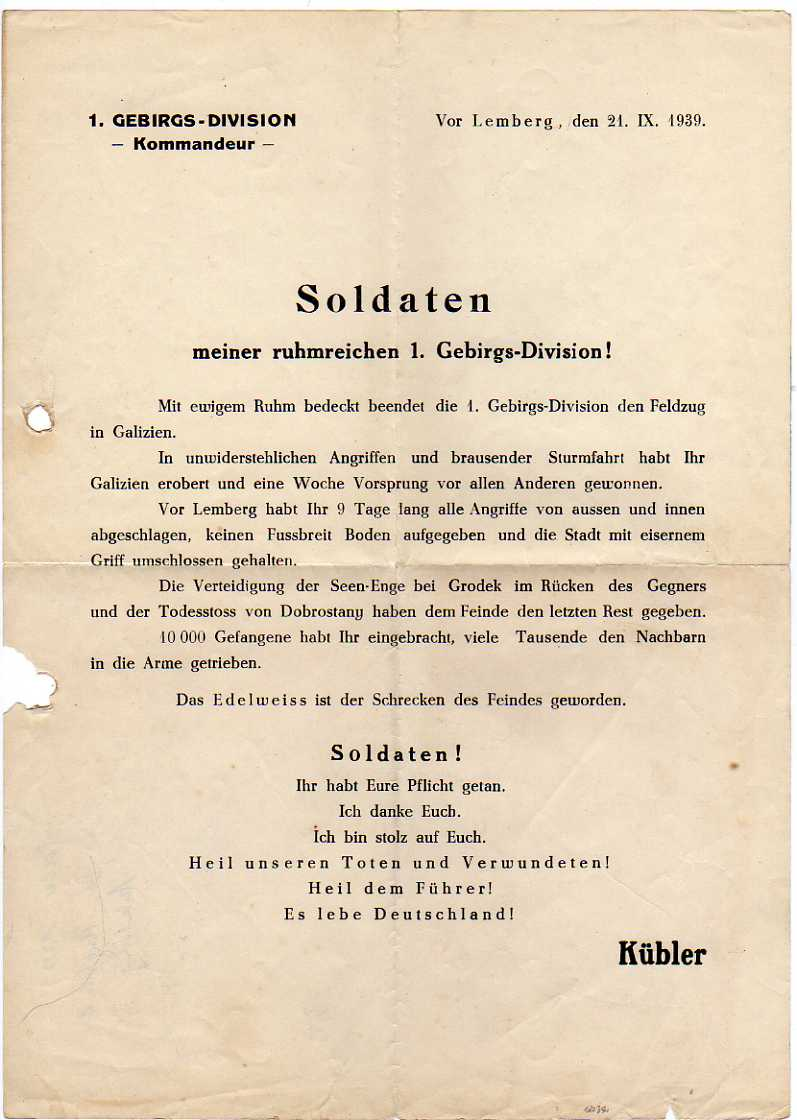
Daily Order of General Ludwig Kübler to the soldiers of 1st Mountain Division after the Battle of Lwów (September 21st, 1939)

At the start of World War II, Kübler's division was involved in the invasion of Poland as part of the 14th Army, commencing on 1 September 1939. It fought in the Carpathian Mountains, distinguishing itself during the capture of the Dukla Pass. On 27 October, Kübler was awarded the Knight's Cross of the Iron Cross for his role in the Polish campaign. Then on 1 December 1939 he was promoted to Generalleutnant. During the invasion of France and the Low Countries in May 1940, Kübler's division was not heavily committed, fighting on the Franco-Belgian border and crossing the Maas on 15 May. The division was stationed around Arras after the fall of France, as it had been selected to form part of the invasion force for Operation Sealion, the invasion of the United Kingdom. After that operation was postponed, on 25 October 1940 Kübler was appointed to command the XXXXIX Mountain Corps, which included the 1st Mountain Division. His corps was earmarked for Operation Felix, the planned capture of Gibraltar, but that operation was also called off. Due to the disfigurement caused by the wounds he suffered during World War I, Kübler became known to his troops as "Limping Nurmi", a reference to the Finnish long-distance runner Paavo Nurmi.

In April 1941, Kübler's XXXXIX Mountain Corps was allocated to the 2nd Army for the German-led Axis invasion of Yugoslavia, and assembled near Klagenfurt prior to the commencement of the invasion on 6 April. By this time, Kübler had been promoted to General der Infanterie. For the Axis attack on the Soviet Union that commenced on 22 June 1941, Kübler's corps was allocated to the 17th Army, itself part of Army Group South. Kübler's rank was redesignated from General der Infanterie to General der Gebirgstruppe. On 19 December 1941, Kübler was appointed commander of the 4th Army. This occurred during the desperate winter defensive fighting when Adolf Hitler would not countenance any withdrawals. Kübler found Hitler's approach "intolerable" and sought relief. On 20 January 1942 he was transferred to the Army Führerreserve (senior officer reserve pool).

From 22 July and 1 October 1943, Kübler was acting commander of the Army Group Centre Rear Area, responsible for security warfare in the territories behind Army Group Centre. On 1 October he was appointed to command the Operational Zone of the Adriatic Littoral (OZAK), based in Trieste on the northern Adriatic coast. On 28 August 1944, LXXXXVII Army Corps was formed to command all German Army elements in OZAK, and Kübler was appointed as its commander. Shortly before the end of the war he was wounded and captured in Yugoslavia, tried for war crimes and executed after the war. Along with his successor Generalleutant Hans von Hößlin he was sentenced to death in 1947 by a Yugoslav court. He was hanged in Ljubljana on 18 August 1947, like his younger brother, Generalleutnant Josef Kübler, who was hanged in Belgrade on 26 February 1947.

Kübler was considered a "superb soldier" but a hard taskmaster. In 1964, the German Army barracks in Mittenwald, Bavaria were named after Kübler. In November 1995, Volker Rühe, then the German Minister of Defence, changed the name of the barracks from "General-Kübler-Kaserne" to "Karwendel-Kaserne".

== Awards ==
- Iron Cross (1914) 2nd Class (16 September 1914) & 1st Class (17 November 1914)
- Wound Badge (1914) in Black (7 June 1918)
- Military Merit Order, 4th class with Swords and Crown (Bavaria)
- Saxon Knight's Cross, 2nd Class of the Albert Order with Swords (12 May 1916)
- Honour Cross of the World War 1914/1918 (15 December 1934)
- Wehrmacht Long Service Award, 4th to 1st Class
- Anschluss Medal (21 November 1938)
- Clasp to the Iron Cross (1939) 2nd Class (15 September 1939) & 1st Class (20 September 1939)
- Eastern Front Medal (23 August 1942)
- Knight's Cross of the Iron Cross on 27 October 1939 as Generalmajor and commander of 1. Gebirgs-Division

== Footnotes ==
Military offices
Preceded by none	Commander of 1st Mountain Division; 1 April 1938 – 25 October 1940	Succeeded by General der Gebirgstruppe Hubert Lanz
Preceded by none	Commander of XXXXIX Mountain Corps; 25 October 1940 – 19 December 1941	Succeeded by General der Gebirgstruppe Rudolf Konrad
Preceded by Generalfeldmarschall Günther von Kluge	Commander of 4th Army; 19 December 1941 – 20 January 1942	Succeeded by Generaloberst Gotthard Heinrici
Preceded by General Max von Schenckendorff	Commander of Army Group Centre Rear Area; 22 July 1943 – 1 October 1943	Succeeded by General Edwin von Rothkirch und Trach
Preceded by none	Commander of LXXXXVII Army Corps z.b.V. 28 September 1944 – 7 May 1945	Succeeded by Generalleutnant Hans von Hößlin
