= Virginia Tonelli =

Italian partisan (1903–1944)

Virginia Tonelli

Virginia Tonelli (Castelnovo del Friuli, 13 November 1903 – Trieste, 29 September 1944) was an Italian partisan. She was burned alive by the fascists in the Risiera di San Sabba concentration camp, and was posthumously awarded the Gold Medal of Military Valour.

== Biography ==
Tonelli was born into a poor family. Her father, a bricklayer, who supported seven children, died of typhus in 1915. Virginia began working as a seamstress and then as a nurse, working in the children's hospital in Venice. In 1930 she joined the Italian Communist Party, which at that time operated in hiding due to the ascendance of fascism.

In 1933 she emigrated to Toulon, France. In 1937 she married Pietro Zampollo, a fellow party member who went to fight in Spain in the International Brigades to support the Republic, where he was wounded, sent back to Italy and imprisoned. In Toulon, Tonelli, having become a revolutionary by profession, hosted several comrades who moved between Italy, France and Spain. Among the best-known of these were Giorgio Amendola, Giuseppe Dozza, Giancarlo Pajetta and Emilio Sereni.

In the early months of 1943, with fascism now in difficulty, the party leadership asked her to return to Castelnovo to carry out propaganda and protest actions. In one of these, on 14 June, she was arrested, but the fall of the regime returned her to freedom.

With the German occupation following the armistice of 8 September and with the creation of the Italian Social Republic (the Republic of Salò), Tonelli had to go underground, actively engaging in the Italian resistance movement under the nom de guerre of "Luisa". Her task was to disseminate propaganda material and to collect and deliver materials for the support of the partisan formations operating in Veneto and Friuli.

On 19 September 1944, while she was transporting documents from Udine to Trieste with a colleague, Wilma Tominez Padovan, she was arrested and imprisoned by the fascists. She was brutally tortured for ten days to extract information but to no avail. She was then taken to the Risiera di San Sabba concentration camp and burned alive on 29 September. Her remains were never found. On January 25, 1971, she was posthumously awarded the Gold Medal of Military Valour.

A plaque placed in Castelnovo remembers her with an inscription written by the poet Tito Maniacco:

In memoria di coloro che non piegarono
e di Virginia Tonelli "Luisa"
che quando la terra era sotto il piede nazista e fascista
oscura parlò, convinse, lottò.
Catturata trasformò in silenzio l’odio del popolo
e in silenzio morì alla Risiera di San Sabba.
O tu che passi per il tuo pacifico lavoro
ricordati di ricordare.

(In memory of those who did not fold
and of Virginia Tonelli "Luisa"
who when the earth was under the Nazi and fascist foot
secretly spoke, convinced, fought.
Captured she silently transformed the hatred of the people
and silently died at the Risiera di San Sabba.
O you who go through your peaceful work
remember to remember.)

There are also monuments to her in Paludea and Davour la Mont, the region of Friuli-Venezia Giulia, in north-eastern Italy.

== Honours ==

Partisan animated by profound faith and endowed with high intellectual and organizational skills, for a long time she carried out important risky tasks of liaison between various partisan formations and the management bodies of the resistance movement of Veneto and Lombardy. Actively sought, she was captured in Trieste and subjected for twenty days to atrocious, inhuman tortures in order to know the precious news in her possession. Given the impossibility, thanks to the heroic spirit of sacrifice of the martyr, to obtain the information requested of her, her tormentors, exasperated by her, burned her alive. Sublime example of conscious sacrifice in the name of the freedom of the Fatherland. - Trieste, 29 September 1944

== Bibliography ==
- Domenicali, Ines (2000). Oscura parlò, convinse, lottò. Virginia Tonelli medaglia d'oro della Resistenza friulana [Secretly spoke, convinced, fought. Virginia Tonelli gold medal of the Friulian Resistance] (in Italian). Padua: Il Poligrafo. ISBN 9788871152035.
