= Elio Morpurgo =

Italian politician (1858–1944)

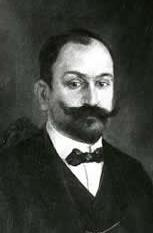
Portrait of Elio Morpurgo

Elio Morpurgo (10 October 1858 – 29 March 1944) was an Italian politician, member of the Italian Senate and of the Chamber of Deputies, and mayor of Udine.

== Biography ==
Between 1889 and 1894 Morpurgo was mayor of Udine. The next year he became a member of the Chamber of Deputies, and held that office until 1919. During this period he was also undersecretary to the "ministry of post service and telegraph" and twice to the "Ministry of industry, commerce and work". In 1920 he became a member of the Italian Senate. In 1944 Morpurgo was arrested and imprisoned in the Risiera di San Sabba because he was a Jew, even though he had joined the National Fascist Party. In the same year he was forced to board a train to the Auschwitz concentration camp, but he died during the journey.
