= XXXXIX Mountain Corps =

XXXIX Mountain Corps
- Active: 20 June – 1 July 1940; 25 October 1940 – 8 May 1945
- Disbanded: 8 May 1945
- Country: Germany

Commanders
- Notable commanders: Ludwig Kübler etc.

XXXXIX Mountain Corps was a mountain warfare corps of the German Army during World War II.

== Operational history ==
XXXXIX Mountain Corps participated in the invasion of Yugoslavia in April 1941. In June 1941, it participated in Operation Barbarossa, the invasion of the Soviet Union, as part of Army Group South.

The corps fought on the Eastern Front for the remainder of World War II, seeing action in the Battles of Uman, the Sea of Azov, and Rostov, and in the Kerch–Eltigen Operation in 1943. During 1944 and 1945 it withdrew through Ukraine and Slovakia to the area around Havlíčkův Brod in Bohemia, where it surrendered to the Soviets in May 1945.

== Commanders ==
Commanding generals

- General der Gebirgstruppe Ludwig Kübler (25 October 1940 – 19 December 1941)
- General der Gebirgstruppe Rudolf Konrad (19 December 1941 – 26 July 1943)
- General der Infanterie Helge Auleb (26 July – 15 August 1943)
- General der Gebirgstruppe Rudolf Konrad (15 August 1943 – 15 February 1944)
- General der Infanterie Friedrich Köchling (15 February – 15 March 1944)
- General der Gebirgstruppe Rudolf Konrad (15 March – 10 May 1944)
- General der Artillerie Walter Hartmann (10 May – 26 July 1944)
- General der Infanterie Franz Beyer (26 July – 4 August 1944)
- General der Artillerie Walter Hartmann (4 & 5 August 1944)
- General der Gebirgstruppe Karl von Le Suire (5 August 1944 – 8 May 1945)

Chiefs of Staff

- Oberst Ferdinand Jodl (25 October 1940 – 6 January 1942)
- Generalmajor Josef Kübler (6 January 1942 – 19 January 1943)
- Oberst Wolf-Dietrich von Xylander (19 January – 1 June 1943)
- Oberst Ernst Michael (1 Juni – 5 August 1943)
- Oberst Wilhelm Haidlen (5 August 1943 – 30 May 1944)
- Oberst Kurt von Einem (30 May – 5 August 1944)
- Oberst Wilhelm Haidlen (5 August 1944 – 1 February 1945)
- Oberstleutnant Ludwig von Eimannsberger (1 February – 5 April 1945)
- Oberstleutnant Werner Vogl (5 April – May 1945)

== Bibliography ==
- Tessin, Georg. Verbände und Truppen der deutschen Wehrmacht und Waffen–SS im Zweiten Weltkrieg 1939–1945 [Units and Troops of the German Military and Waffen-SS in the Second World War 1939–1945] (in German). Vol. 5: Die Landstreitkräfte 31–70 (Units 31–70). Osnabrück: Biblio.
- U.S. Army (1986) [1953]. The German Campaigns in the Balkans (Spring 1941). Washington, D.C.: United States Army Center of Military History. OCLC 16940402. CMH Pub 104-4. Archived from the original on 13 December 2007.
