= Odilo Globocnik =

Austrian Nazi, SS officer, and Holocaust perpetrator (1904–1945)

Odilo Globočnik
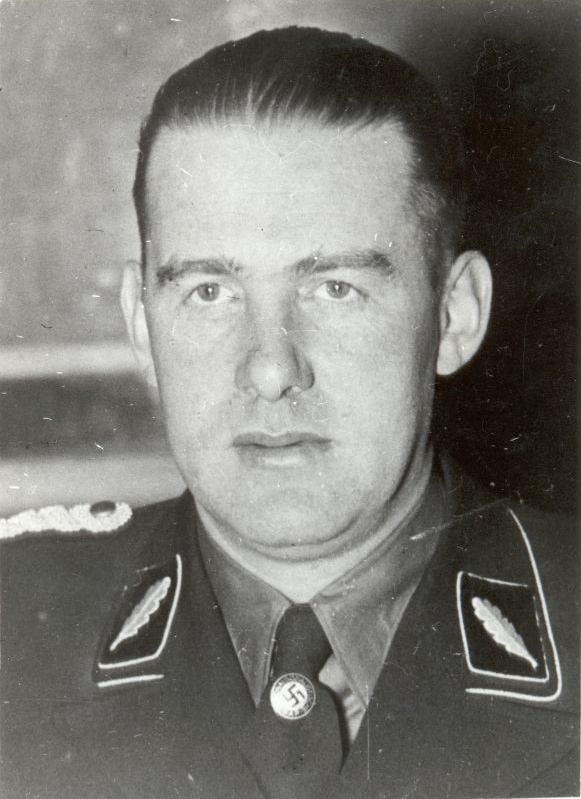
- Globočnik in 1938

Chief of Operation Reinhard
- In office October 1941 – October 1943 (Note: Although Operation Reinhard only began in March 1942, Globocnik received the order to murder all Jews in the General Government as early as October 1941. Operation Reinhard was declared over in October 1943.)

Personal details
- Born: 21 April 1904 Trieste, Austria-Hungary (now Italy)
- Died: 31 May 1945 (aged 41) Paternion, Allied-occupied Austria
- Cause of death: Suicide by cyanide poisoning
- Party: Nazi Party

Military service
- Allegiance: Republic of German-Austria; Nazi Germany
- Branch/service: Schutzstaffel
- Rank: SS-Gruppenführer
- Battles/wars: Carinthian War; World War II

Odilo Lothar Ludwig Globočnik (Note: His surname is often spelled Globocnik, without the caron, especially in German sources. Alternativelly, it may be Germanised to Globotschnigg (or Globotschnig).) (21 April 1904 – 31 May 1945) was a Nazi Party official and a perpetrator of the Holocaust. A high-ranking member of the SS, Globočnik was the leader of Operation Reinhard, the organized murder of around one and a half million Jews, mostly of Polish origin, during the Holocaust in the Majdanek, Treblinka, Sobibór and Bełżec extermination camps. Historian Michael Allen described him as "the vilest individual in the vilest organization ever known". Globočnik committed suicide shortly after his capture and detention by British soldiers.

== Early life ==
Odilo Lothar Ludwig Globočnik was born on 21 April 1904 in the Imperial Free City of Trieste, then the capital of the Austrian Littoral administrative region of the Austro-Hungarian Empire (now within Italy). He was the second child of Franz Globočnik, a Slovene cavalry lieutenant in the Austro-Hungarian Army.

His father was unable to save enough money required to get an officer's marriage permission and had to leave the service. As was the practice at this time, he was given a job in the Imperial and Royal Mail. Odilo's mother Anna (née Petschinka), was born in Versecz, Kingdom of Hungary (now Vršac, Serbia), scholars have variously described her background as Slovene, Hungarian, or Volksdeutsche. In 1914, the family left Trieste for Cseklész, where Franz Globočnik was recalled to active duty after the outbreak of World War I.

The same year, Globočnik joined the army, via a military school. The war ended his military education prematurely. He moved with his family to Klagenfurt in Carinthia. There as a teenager, he joined the pro-Austrian volunteer militia fighting Slovene volunteers and, later, the Yugoslav Army during the Carinthian War (1918–19). In 1920, he worked as an underground propagandist for the Austrian cause during the Carinthian plebiscite.

He later enrolled at the Höhere Staatsgewerbeschule (a higher vocational school for mechanical engineering), where he passed his Matura (the Austrian equivalent of the German Abitur) and graduated with honours. He worked as a porter at the railway station, among other jobs, to help financially support his family.

Globočnik first became politically active in 1922, when he became a prominent member of pre-Nazi Carinthian paramilitary organisations and was seen wearing a swastika. At the time, he was a building tradesman, introduced to his job while engaged to Grete Michner. Her father, Emil Michner, had talked to the director of KÄWAG (Kärntner Wasserkraftwerke AG)—an electricity distribution company of Carinthia—and secured Globočnik a job as a technician and construction supervisor.

=== Slavic ancestry ===
In 1938, an English provincial newspaper noted his Slavic origins, describing him as "a Slovene from Carinthia", in what may have been an attempt to undermine his standing among Austrian Nazis.

In his 2004 biography of Globočnik, historian Gregor Joseph Kranjc devoted the entire first chapter to the debate concerning Globočnik's ancestry. He says that Globočnik was ridiculed by other Nazis for his surname, because of the Nazis classifying Slavs as sub-human (Untermenschen). However, with Globočnik having a powerful and high-ranking ally such as Heinrich Himmler, he was protected from other Nazis, and Himmler defended him by claiming that he was of Aryan origin and that his surname was a result of "Slavicisation".

In his biography, historian Joseph Poprzeczny cited Austro-Hungarian census data from 1910 and evidence of multi-generational Germanisation to characterise the Globočniks as enculturated southern Slavs rather than ethnic Germans.

== Nazi Party and SS career ==
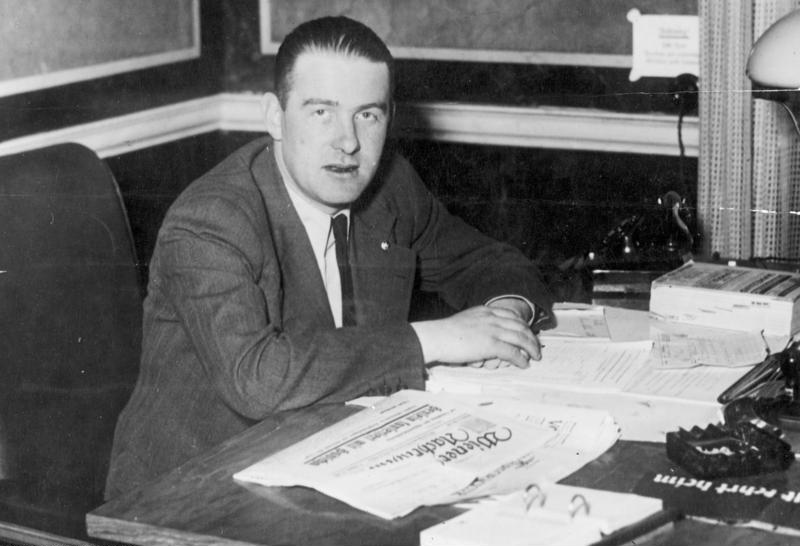
Gauleiter of Vienna, 1938

In August 1933, Globočnik was arrested for the first time, for his attempt to contact imprisoned Nazis in Klagenfurt. In the same year, he became a member of the Austrian SS. He was arrested due to his public support for the Nazi Party (NSDAP), as he had become a member of the party in 1931 while he was in Carinthia. Although he was arrested four times between 1933 and 1935, he served just over a year in jail on various political charges. Heinrich Himmler intervened on his behalf, after two years of arguments between Globočnik and the authorities.

His first documented activity for the NSDAP occurred in 1931 when he was documented as distributing propaganda for the party. By then, he had nearly abandoned his work as a building tradesman, and attached himself very closely to the NSDAP. He was assigned to develop a courier and intelligence service for the NSDAP, which channeled funds from the German Reich into Austria. In June 1933, in Vienna, Jewish jeweller Norbert Futterweit was killed when a bomb was thrown at his shop. This was among the earliest murders in Austria attributable to the Nazis, and a number of historians believe that Globočnik was involved in the attack.

Globočnik joined the Schutzstaffel (SS) on 1 September 1934. His devotion to the Nazi cause paid off, as he was quickly promoted in the party apparatus in Austria. He became a Deputy Gauleiter briefly in Vienna and then in Carinthia between January and May 1933. He was appointed as the head of the party intelligence apparatus in Carinthia, serving from 1934 to 1936. From September 1936 to May 1938, he served as the Chief of Staff of the National Leadership of the Austrian Nazi Party under Hubert Klausner.

Globočnik was a key player in the usurpation of the Austrian government by the Nazis. With the Anschluss, Nazi Germany annexed Austria on 12 March 1938. He was rewarded with an appointment as a State Secretary in the Nazi government, established by Chancellor Arthur Seyss-Inquart on 15 March. At the parliamentary election of 10 April, he was elected as a Nazi deputy to the Reichstag from the newly renamed Ostmark. Next came his appointment as Gauleiter of Vienna on 22 May 1938 by Adolf Hitler. According to Robin O'Neill:

In his early tenure as Gauleiter, Globočnik espoused Nazi anti-Jewish philosophy: "I will not recoil from radical interventions for the solution of Jewish questions." Later that same year he opened Vienna's first anti-Semitic political exhibition, which was attended by 10,000 visitors on the first day. Prominent at the exhibition and received enthusiastically by the public was the film, "The Eternal Jew".

Early gestures of accommodation to the new government by Cardinal Theodor Innitzer did not assuage the Austrian Nazi radicals, foremost among them being Globočnik. He launched a crusade against the Church, and the Nazis confiscated property, closed Catholic organisations and sent many priests to Dachau. Anger at the treatment of the Church in Austria grew quickly, and in October 1938 the first act of overt mass resistance to the new regime took place. A rally of thousands left Mass in Vienna chanting "Christ is our Führer", before being dispersed by police. A Nazi mob ransacked Cardinal Innitzer's residence, after he denounced Nazi persecution of the Church.

Globočnik was relieved of his posts and stripped of his party honours on 30 January 1939, when it was discovered that he was involved in illegal foreign currency speculation. As punishment, Himmler transferred Globočnik to the Waffen-SS, in the rank of junior sergeant (Unterscharführer), where he served with SS Standarte "Germania" during the Polish campaign. In late 1939, Globočnik was pardoned, promoted to SS-Brigadeführer, and assigned to Lublin province.

=== Crimes in occupied-Poland ===
On 9 November 1939, Himmler appointed Globočnik as SS and Police Leader in the Lublin district of the General Government territory. After the initially disappointing party career, Globočnik now had a second chance in the ranks of the SS and the police. On 16 February 1940, Globočnik declared: "The evacuated Jews should feed themselves and be supported by their countrymen, as these Jews have enough [food]. If this does not succeed, one should let them starve".

In the following years, Globočnik was responsible for:

1. Liquidating the Warsaw Ghetto, which contained about 500,000 Jews, the largest Jewish community in Europe and the second-largest in the world after New York City.
2. Liquidating the Białystok Ghetto, which had strongly resisted German occupation.
3. Resettling a large number of Poles under the premise of 'ethnic cleansing'.
4. Implementation and supervision of the Lublin reservation, to which 95,000 Jews were deported, with its adjacent network of forced labour camps in the Lublin district. He was also in charge of over 45,000 Jewish labourers.

Globočnik is reported to have taken great joy in killings and organizing killings of Jews, stating that—in Höss' rendition—Globočnik "wanted to be in the forefront with his exterminations" even when transportation capacities did not allow for it and then he "carried out executions at his own discretion".

=== Extermination camps ===
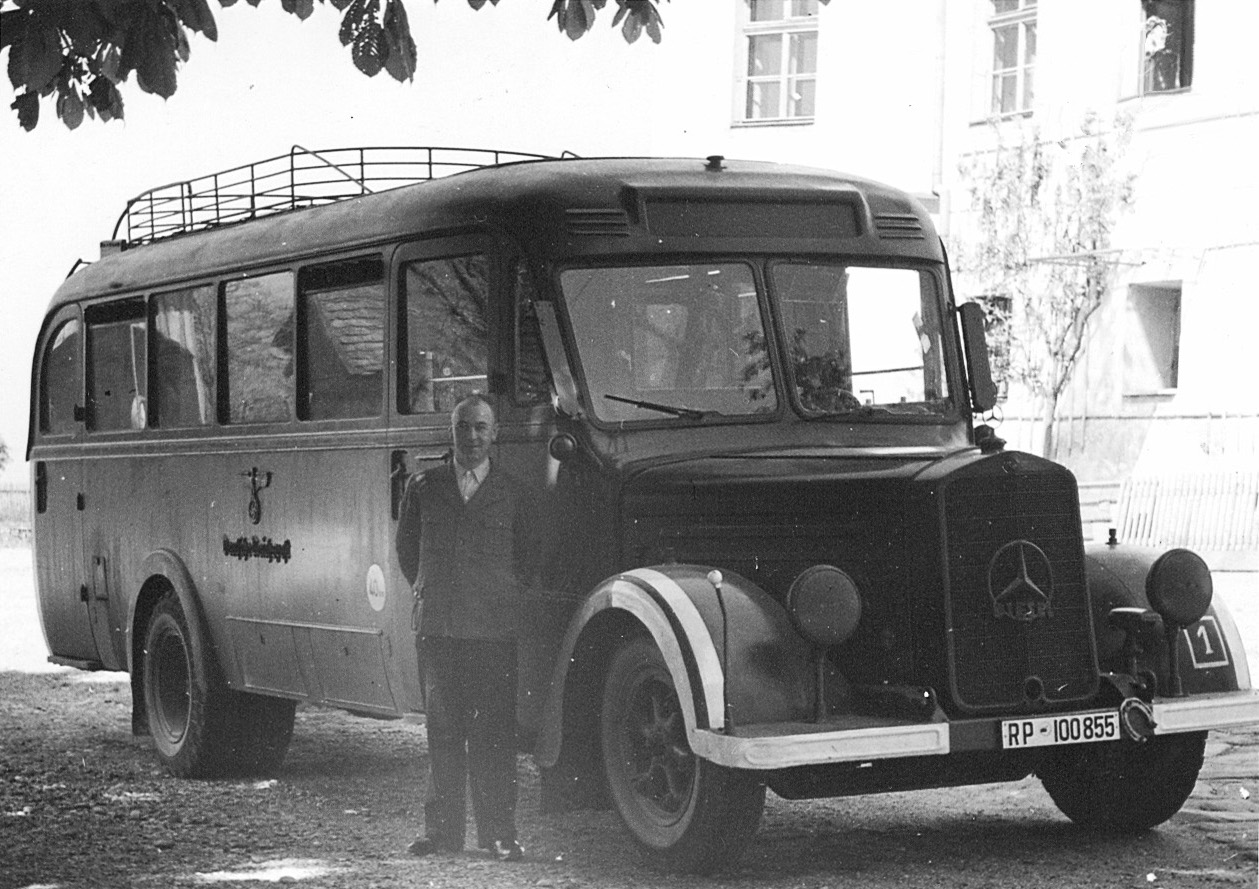
Aktion T4 bus for the transport to Hartheim Euthanasia Centre

There are indications that Globočnik, along with a chief accomplice Christian Wirth, may have originated the concept of the extermination camp and industrialised murder, and suggested the concept to Himmler. At a two-hour meeting with Himmler on 13 October 1941, Globočnik received verbal approval to begin construction of the Belzec extermination camp, the first such camp in the General Government. Shortly beforehand, in September 1941, Globočnik had been visited by Philipp Bouhler and Viktor Brack, the top officials in the Führer Chancellery responsible for the Aktion T4 "euthanasia" program, which had been using gas chambers disguised as shower rooms to execute many of its victims. On or about 1 October 1941, Globočnik wrote a memorandum to Himmler containing proposals for actions against the Jews "of a security policy nature", and the 13 October meeting was held to discuss this memorandum and related subjects.

A colleague's contemporaneous letter reflects Globočnik's state of mind at the time of the 13 October meeting: Globočnik said it was necessary to undertake a "cleansing of the entire [General Government] of Jews and Poles" and was "full of good and far-reaching plans" to achieve this objective. There are indications that Globočnik may have begun a crude experimental gassing facility in the woods near Belzec shortly before his mid-October meeting with Himmler. At the 13 October 1941 meeting with Himmler, Globočnik proposed exterminating the Jews in assembly-line fashion in a concentration camp, using gas chambers. On 14 October 1941—the day after he had met with Globočnik—Himmler held a five-hour meeting with Reinhard Heydrich to discuss "executions", following which other extermination camp gassing sites were built. Days later, Himmler forbade all further Jewish emigration from Reich territory "in view of the forthcoming 'Final Solution' to the Jewish question".

The gassing facilities that Globočnik established at Belzec soon after his 13 October meeting with Himmler were designed by T4 programme personnel assigned to him. They used carbon monoxide, as the T4 programme had done. Before it became an extermination camp, Belzec had been part of Himmler's and Globočnik's Burggraben project. The construction of three more death camps, Sobibor and Majdanek in the Lublin district and Treblinka at Małkinia Górna, followed in 1942. Globočnik was complicit in the extermination of more than 1.5 million Jews of Polish, Czech, Dutch, French, Russian, Slovak, German, Portuguese, Turkish, Spanish, and Austrian origin, as well as a smaller number of non-Jews, in the death camps under his control.

He exploited Jews and non-Jews as slave labourers in his own forced labour camps. He was responsible for seizing the properties and valuables of murdered inmates while in charge of Operation Reinhard. Although other arms of the Nazi state were also involved in the overall management of the greater concentration camp system, Globočnik had control over the Aktion Reinhard camps, and any orders that he received came directly from Himmler. From 1942 to 1943, he also oversaw the beginning of the Generalplan Ost, the plan to expel Poles from their lands and resettle those territories with German settlers (see Zamość Uprising). On 9 November 1942, Globočnik was promoted to SS-Gruppenführer and Generalleutnant der Polizei.

On November 4, 1943, Globočnik reported to Himmler from Trieste that he had concluded Operation Reinhard, as of October 19, 1943, and that all camps had been dissolved. He also sent a final report. In his reply, Himmler thanked Globočnik and expressed his gratitude and appreciation for the great and unique services he had rendered to the entire German people in carrying out Operation Reinhard.

=== Activities in Italy ===
After the Armistice of Cassibile, Globočnik was appointed as Higher SS and Police Leader of the Operational Zone of the Adriatic Littoral of Italy on 13 September 1943.

After the completion of Operation Reinhard in Poland, he was sent to his hometown Trieste:

With him he brought to Trieste a large number of experienced killers who had distinguished records from various extermination operations in Germany, the Soviet Union and the death camps in occupied Poland at Belzec, Sobibor and Treblinka. They included the 92 specialists of Einsatzkommando Reinhard, many of whom were Ukrainian SS troops, male and female... Einsatzkommando Reinhard was divided into three geographical areas, the headquarters for each of which was officially denoted with a variation of the letter R – R1 for Trieste, R2 for Udine and R3 for Fiume.

Having looted assets stolen from Holocaust victims at death camps in occupied Poland, Globočnik went to Italy with a number of his men who had taken part in Aktion Tiergarten 4 including Franz Stangl from Treblinka and Franz Reichleitner from Sobibor. A few days after 8 September 1943 (when the Armistice between Italy and the Allies signed on 3 September had come into force), Christian Wirth arrived in Trieste. Together, they converted an old rice mill on the outskirts of the city into a detention centre complete with a crematorium, known as Risiera di San Sabba (in Slovene: Rižarna). At San Sabba, thousands of Italian Jews, partisans and other political dissidents were interrogated, tortured and murdered under the direction of these men after the 1943 downfall of Benito Mussolini and the German takeover of the country.

In Slovene Littoral, Slovene partisans were fought both by Germans and by the Littoral Home Guard, which was also under Globočnik's direct command. It provided Germans with lists of locations of Liberation Front of the Slovene Nation hideouts and suspicious individuals (described as "propagandists").

With the advance of Allied troops, Globočnik retreated into Austrian Carinthia and finally went into hiding high in the mountains near Weissensee, still in the company of his closest staff members.

== Death ==
Globočnik was tracked down and captured by a British armoured cavalry unit on 31 May 1945 in Carinthia, Austria. A unit from the 4th Queen's Own Hussars, found him on the Möslacher Alm, a 1,250 m (4,100 ft) mountain in the Eastern Alps, with seven other wanted Nazis: Georg Michalsen, Friedrich Rainer, Ernst Lerch, Hermann Höfle, Karl Hellesberger, Hugo Herzog, and Friedrich Plöb. Globočnik was taken to Paternion in Villach-Land District to be interrogated. Before he was questioned, Globočnik committed suicide by biting on a cyanide capsule. His body was taken to be buried in a local churchyard but the priest reportedly refused to have "the body of such a man" resting in consecrated ground. A grave was dug outside the churchyard, next to an outer wall, and the body was buried without ceremony.

Contemporary photographs of Globočnik's corpse and reliable reports, such as the Regimental Diary and Field Reports of the 4th Queen's Own Hussars, detailed the circumstances of his capture and suicide. Some have speculated that his death came at the hands of either partisans or a Jewish revenge squad, or that he was turned over alive to U.S. intelligence by the British. The latter claim is based on an "official U.S. document signed by U.S. CIC S/A Operations Officer Andrew L. Venters, dated 27 October 1948, more than three years after his supposed death". This document was exposed as a fabrication in the 1980s by the investigative writer and historian, Gitta Sereny; she gives all details in an article within The Observer newspaper.

== Portrayal in media ==
Globočnik is a key antagonist in the Robert Harris alternative-history novel Fatherland; in the book set in 1964, a character based on Globočnik is still alive and a top SS official. In the 1994 television film adaptation, Globočnik was played by John Shrapnel.

In the Harry Turtledove alternate-history novel In the Presence of Mine Enemies, set in 2010, a former Reichskommissar for Ostland Affairs called Odilo Globočnik (likely an analogue rather than the historical figure) is briefly installed as Führer in an SS-backed coup d'état against the reformist Heinz Buckliger; after the coup fails due to popular opposition, Globočnik is lynched.

In 2018, Slovenian theatre director Dragan Živadinov created and directed a theatre performance titled Odilo. Zatemnitev. Oratorij. (Odilo. Obscuration. Oratorio.) about Globočnik, his many crimes and his complicated place in Slovenian history. The theatre piece was devised as a ritualistic killing of Globočnik’s name, and the obstruction of the resurrection of his acts, with a firm anti-Nazi stance.

== See also ==
- List of Nazi Party leaders and officials
- List of SS personnel
- Glossary of Nazi Germany
