= Risiera di San Sabba =

Nazi concentration camp in Trieste, Italy

- Concentration camp
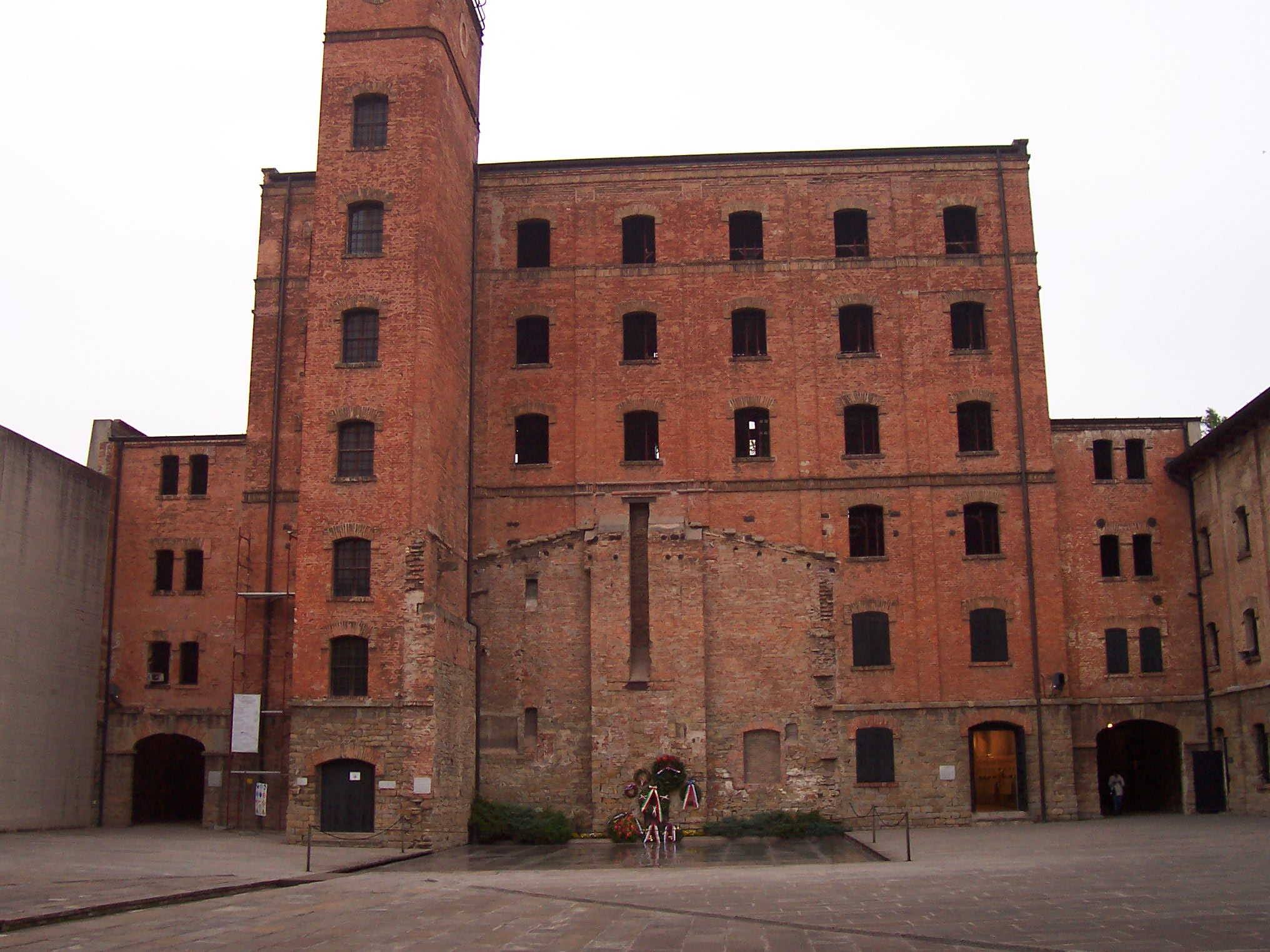
- Internal courtyard of the Risiera di San Sabba. The remains of the crematorium can be seen on the wall.

- Location within Italy
- Coordinates: 45°37′15″N 13°47′21″E
- Other names: Stalag 339, KZ Risiera di San Sabba
- Location: Trieste, Italian Social Republic
- Operated by: SS
- Commandant: Josef Oberhauser
- Original use: Facility for milling rice
- Operational: 8 September 1943 – 30 April 1945
- Inmates: Italian Political prisoners, Italian Jews, Yugoslavian Resistance fighters and Yugoslavian civilians (primarily Slovenes and Croats)
- Killed: 3,000–5,000
- Notable inmates: Boris Pahor
- Website: https://risierasansabba.it/

Risiera di San Sabba (Slovene: Rižarna) was a Nazi concentration camp operating in Trieste. Officially designated as a police detention camp (Polizeihaftlager), it was the only one on Italian territory with a crematorium. It was primarily used to eliminate members of the resistance in the Operational Zone of the Adriatic Littoral (OZAK), but another important function was as a transit camp for Jews on the way to the extermination camps, primarily Auschwitz. It was a place typical of the Nazi system to help realize the final solution to the Jewish question and to suppress undesirable rebels (which the Nazis labelled as Banditen), while on the other hand systematically exploiting the civilian population.

On top of prisoners killed on the spot or deported, civilians who were captured in raids or destined for forced labour were also confined here. Estimates for the number of victims of San Sabba range from 2000 based on court testimonies up to a maximum of 5000. Victims were usually killed either using exhaust gasses from transport vehicles or they were bludgeoned to death; it is also recorded that some of the victims were shot.

Approximately 1450 Jews deported from OZAK passed through San Sabba, of which only around 20 survived, while 28 are confirmed to have been killed in the camp as they were deemed too old or weak for transportation.

In 1965 the Risiera was declared a national monument and in 1975 it became a museum.

== History ==
The building complex was built between 1898 and 1913 in the periphery of Trieste in the San Sabba (or San Saba) neighbourhood and was first used for rice-husking, giving it the name Risiera.

Following the Armistice of Cassibile in 1943, large parts of northern Italy became part of the Italian Social Republic, with the provinces of Udine, Trieste, Gorizia, Pola, Fiume and Ljubljana fell under the control of OZAK. The administration of the territory was placed under the command of Friedrich Rainer, the Gauleiter of Carinthia.

Initially the Risiera became a provisional prisoner of war camp for Italian soldiers captured following the armistice, becoming known as Stalag 339.

At the end of October 1943 the complex became a Polizeihaftlager (or police detention camp), used for the collection of prisoners awaiting deportation to Germany and Poland. The facility was used for the detention or elimination of partisans and political prisoners, Jehovah's Witnesses and Jews who were deemed too weak to survive transportation.

After a few months a crematorium was built at the camp by Erwin Lambert.

The Risiera was also used as a storage facility for the items stolen from the prisoners. SS official Odilo Globočnik, previously a close collaborator of Reinhard Heydrich and responsible for the extermination camps in the General Government as part of Operation Reinhard, responsible for the killing of 1.2 million Jews supervised the Risiera. He was assisted by members of the Einsatzkommando Reinhard, under the command of Dietrich Allers while Josef Oberhauser was the commandant. Both had begun their work as part of Aktion T4, which organized the forced euthanasia of the physically and mentally disabled in the camps of Treblinka, Sobibor and Belzec (100,000 victims according to the Nuremberg Trials).

The then Bishop of Trieste, Antonio Santin often intervened with the Nazi authorities, sometimes resulting in the release of prisoners (such as Giani Stuparich and his family), but often with little success.

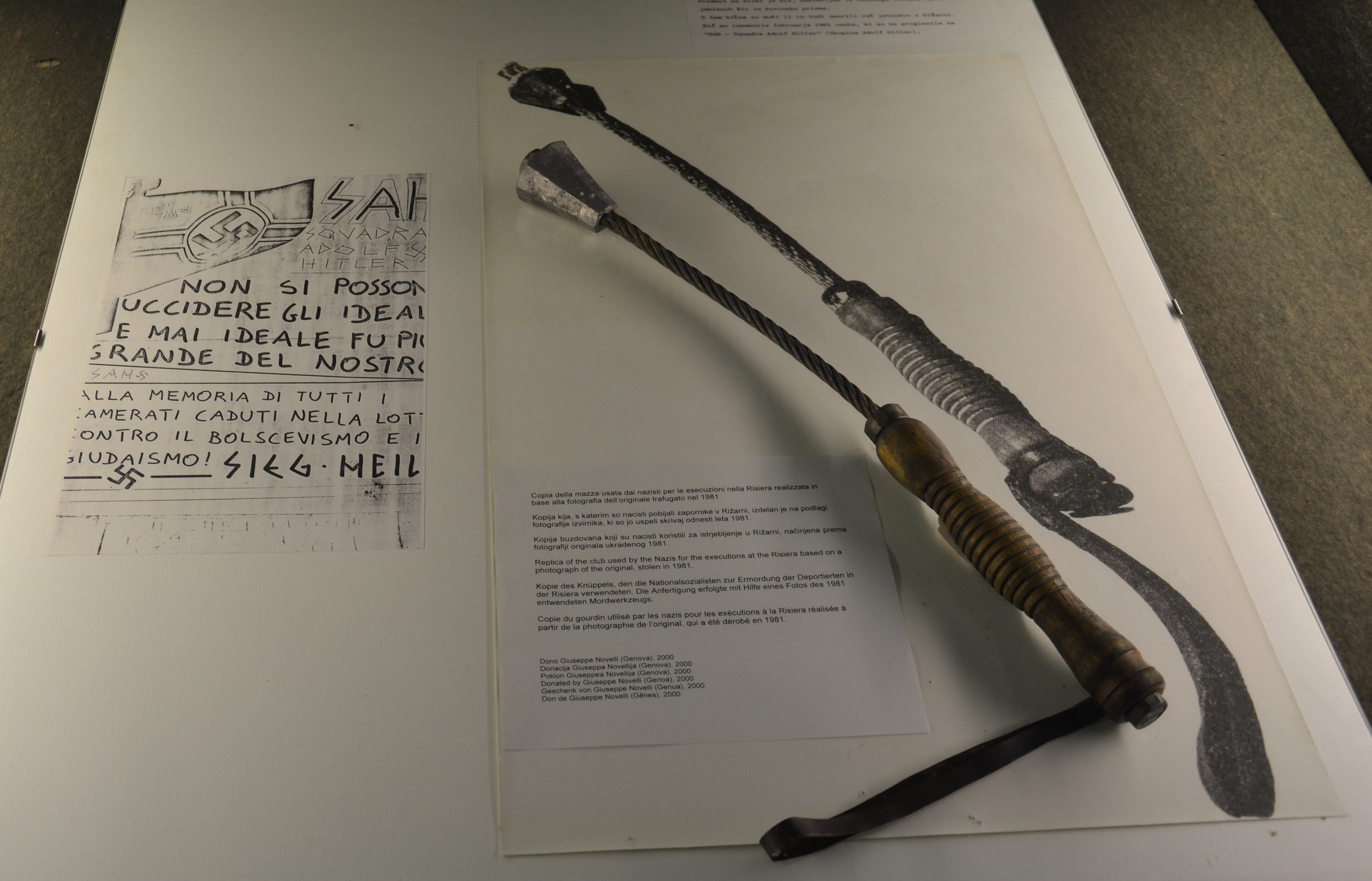
Replica of the club used to kill prisoners

The Nazis used a variety of methods for executions, such as using the exhaust gasses from motor-vehicles, using the drying room from the Risiera before transforming it in to a crematorium which was then used for the destruction of bodies starting from 6 April 1944 with the cremation of about 70 bodies from prisoners who were shot the previous day at Villa Opicina. In a number of cases prisoners were burnt alive, such as partisans Cecilia Deganutti and Virginia Tonelli. Others were murdered by gunshot or being clubbed with a mace that was later found and kept in the museum until it was stolen in 1977.

The Risiera served as a transit camp, holding more than 8000 deportees from the eastern provinces and headed for other concentration camps, notably Jews destined for Auschwitz, it was also used for the detention, torture of murder of prisoners who were suspected of subversive activities by the Nazi regime. Some Italian informers actively participated in revealing the identities of Jews to the Nazi authorities, the most well known of these informers was Mauro Grini who is thought to be responsible for the arrest of about 300 Jews with his network of collaborators.

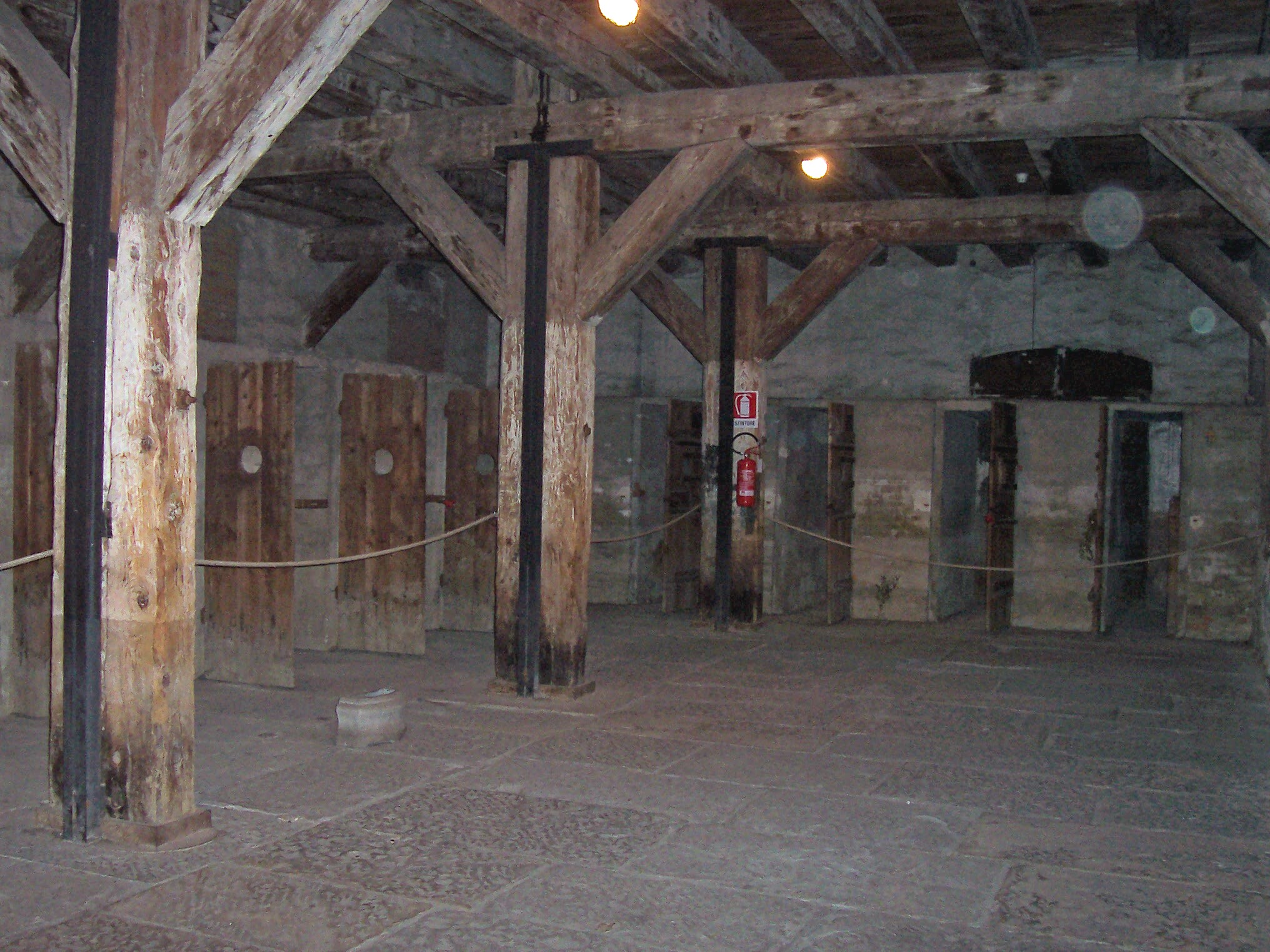
Cells in the Risiera

The crematorium was demolished using explosives on the night between 29 and 30 April 1945 by the Nazis attempting to destroy the evidence of their crimes while abandoning the camp, but the details were later described in testimonies of surviving prisoners. Bones and human ashes were found in the ruins.

The majority of victims of the camp came from Friuli, the Julian March and the Province of Ljubljana.

=== Post-war ===
After the war, the camp served as a refugee camp and transit point for the mass exodus of soldiers of the Royal Yugoslav Army and their families who were loyal to King Peter II and the 1950s for many people, especially ethnic Italians fleeing former Italian territory in the Socialist Federal Republic of Yugoslavia.

On the 15th April 1965 President of Italy Giuseppe Saragat declared the Risiera di san Sabba a national monument as the "unique example of a Nazi lager in Italy.

In 1975 the RAI television network produced a documentary by Emilio Ravel.

=== Trials ===
On the 16th of February 1976 a trial was started in front of the Corte d'Assise of Trieste against those responsible, after a 30-year investigation. The case was represented by 30 lawyers on behalf of Pietro Caleffi, the families of the victims and the president of the national association for deportees to Nazi camps.

Among the accused for multiple aggravated homicide were Josef Oberhauser and his superior Dietrich Allers. Others responsible had either been killed by partisans at the end of the war or died during the investigation. Allers died in March 1975, so at the end of the trial on 29 April 1976, it was only possible to convict Oberhauser though he never served his sentence as an Italian-German treaty permitted extradition only for crimes committed after 1948. The sentence was confirmed on 28 February 1978, and Oberhauser died on 22 November 1979, never having served his sentence.

== Museum ==
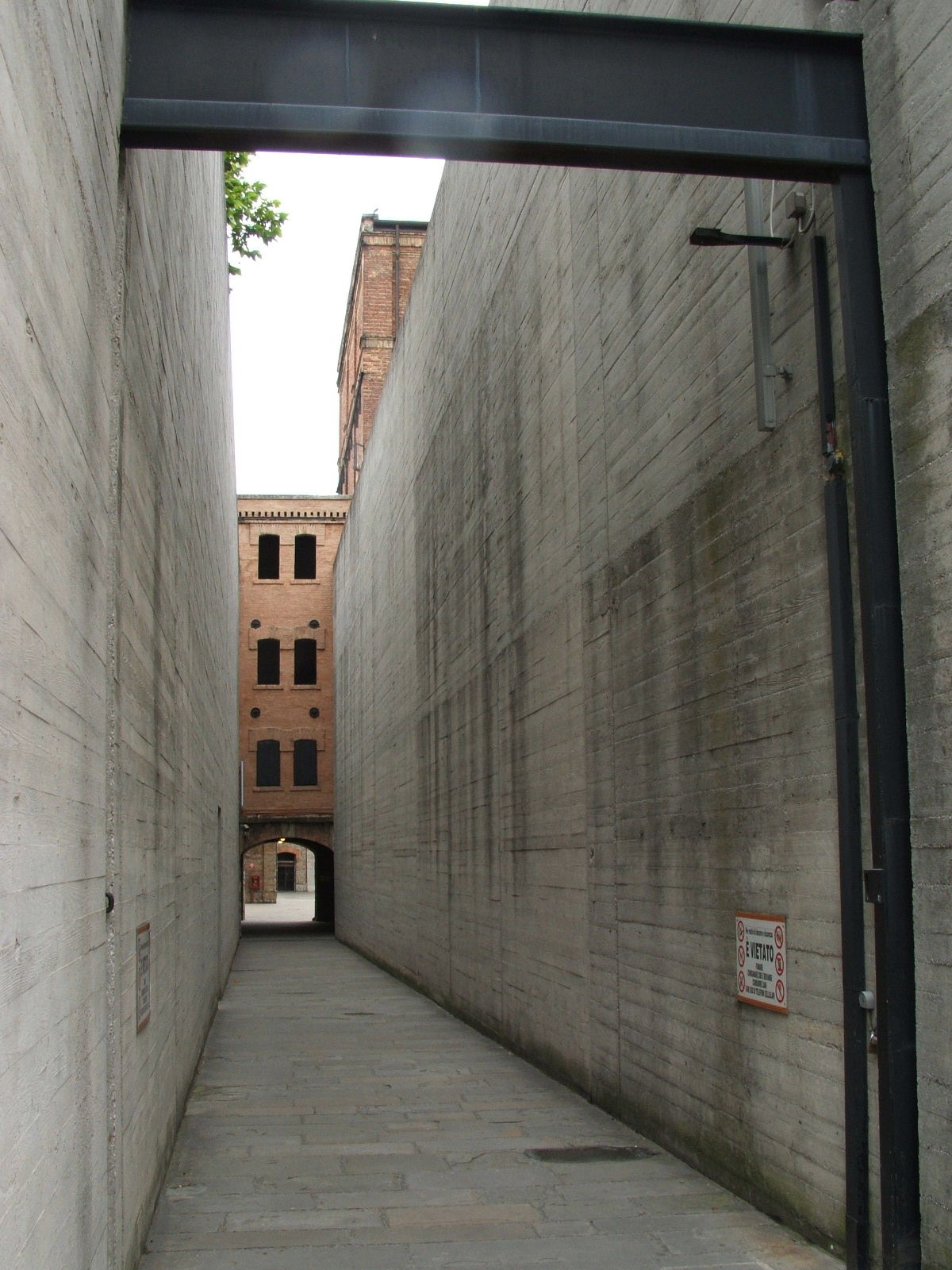
Entrance to the Museum

Inaugurated in 1975, the museum was re-structured as part of a project by the architect Romano Boico.

There are a number of structures that no longer exist in the camp due to the transformation into a refugee camp for the Italians fleeing from the Socialist Federal Republic of Yugoslavia and its restoration and transformation after it became a national monument. Still visible today are:

- The cella della morte where prisoners who were destined to be murdered shortly after arriving at the camp were kept.
- Seventeen cells housing up to six prisoners, reserved especially for Slovenes, Croats, partisans, political prisoners and Jews destined to be executed in a few days or weeks. The first two cells were used for torture and to collect materials from prisoners. Thousands of confiscated identity documents were found taken from prisoners, but also forced laborers.
- The four storey building where large groups of Jews and civilian or military prisoners were kept awaiting deportation to Germany and the camps at Dachau, Auschwitz, Mauthausen, Bergen-Belsen from which very few would return.
- The main building, once used as a barracks, now contains the museum. The area now containing the museum was at the time used as a morgue.

== Notable Prisoners ==
- Giovanni Battista Berghinz, Italian military officer and partisan, tortured and murdered in the camp on 12 August 1944
- Cecilia Deganutti, Italian partisan, murdered in the camp on 4 April 1945
- Vincenzo Gigante, Italian labour organizer, communist and partisan, murdered in the camp in November 1944.
- Elio Morpurgo, Jewish-Italian politician, former Mayor of Udine (1889–1894), member of the Chamber of Deputies (1895–1919), including holding a number of cabinet positions. He was nominated to the Senate in 1919, he became a member of the National Fascist Party. He was arrested and briefly detained at the Risiera in 1944 before being transported to Auschwitz, he died en route.
- Boris Pahor, Slovene Novelist from Trieste, transported to Dachau and a number of other camps before being liberated from Bergen-Belsen on 15 April 1945.
- Giani Stuparich writer and recipient of the Gold Medal of Military Valor for his actions in the First World War, arrested with his family on the night of 25 August 1944, released after seven days following interventions from Antonio Santin and Bruno Coceani.
- Virginia Tonelli, Italian Partisan, murdered in the camp on 29 September 1944

== See also ==
- Bullenhuser Damm
- Operational Zone of the Adriatic Littoral
