= Deutsche Adria-Zeitung =

- Founded: 14 January 1944
- Ceased publication: 1945
- Language: German language
- Headquarters: Trieste
- OCLC number: 442479713

Deutsche Adria-Zeitung was a German-language daily newspaper published from Trieste. The first issue was published on 14 January 1944. The newspaper was published seven times a week and had a weekly supplement called Adria-Illustrierte. Deutsche Adria-Zeitung was discontinued in May 1945.

== Bibliography ==
- La stampa nazista a Trieste 1944-1945. Trieste: "Italo Svevo", 1995.
