= Operational Zone of the Adriatic Littoral =

Nazi German administrative unit on the northern Adriatic coast

Operational Zone of the Adriatic Littoral Operationszone Adriatisches Küstenland (German)
- 1943–1945
- Flag Emblem

- The Operational Zone of the Adriatic Littoral ("OZAK")
- Capital: Trieste
- Government: Commissariat
- High Commissioner
  - 1943–1945: Friedrich Rainer
- History
  - Establishment: 1943
  - Dissolution: 1945
- Today part of: Croatia; Italy; Slovenia

The Operational Zone of the Adriatic Littoral (German: Operationszone Adriatisches Küstenland, OZAK; or colloquially: Operationszone Adria; Italian: Zona d'operazioni del Litorale adriatico; Croatian: Operativna zona Jadransko primorje; Slovene: Operacijska cona Jadransko primorje) was a Nazi German district on the northern Adriatic coast created during World War II in 1943. It was formed out of territories that were previously under Fascist Italian control until its takeover by Germany. It included parts of present-day Italian, Slovenian, and Croatian territories. The area was administered as territory attached, but not incorporated, to the Reichsgau of Carinthia. The capital of the zone was the city of Trieste.

== Background ==
OZAK was established, with its headquarters in Trieste, on 10 September 1943, by Adolf Hitler, as a response to the Italian capitulation (8 September 1943) following the Allied invasion of Italy. It comprised the provinces of Udine, Gorizia, Trieste, Pula (Pola), Rijeka (Fiume) and Ljubljana (Lubiana). The Operational Zone of the Alpine Foothills, comprising the provinces of Belluno, South Tyrol, and Trentino, was established on the same day. Both operational zones were separate from the Italian Social Republic (RSI), based in Salò on Lake Garda, which governed the remainder of Italy that had not yet been occupied by the Allies.

The OZAK was not incorporated in the German Reich outright, but attached to the Gau of Carinthia. Friedrich Rainer, Nazi Gauleiter of Carinthia was appointed Reich Defense Commissioner of OZAK, thereby becoming chief of the civil administration of the semi-annexed territory. The province of Ljubljana was given a Slovenian provincial administration. Leading collaborator Gregorij Rožman, Bishop of Ljubljana, recommended to Rainer that notorious anti-Semite Leon Rupnik should be the president of the new Ljubljana provincial government, and Rupnik was then duly appointed on 22 September 1943. SS General Erwin Rösener became Advisor to the President.

== Genocidal activities ==
OZAK was the scene of genocidal activities. Its commander, Higher SS and Police Leader Odilo Globocnik, had become one of the most feared Nazi leaders in Eastern Europe after liquidating the Jewish ghettoes in Warsaw and Białystok and supervising the operations of the extermination camps at Belzec, Sobibór, Majdanek, and Treblinka. He commanded all the Nazi camps in occupied Poland from 1941 to 1943. After serving briefly as Gauleiter of Vienna he had been posted to Trieste, where to the very end he ran the Risiera di San Sabba prison, the only SS camp ever set-up on Italian soil.

Globocnik, returning to his native city in triumph in mid-September 1943, established his office at Via Nizza 21 in Trieste and began to carry out Einsatz R, the systematic persecution of Jews, partisans and anti-Nazi politicians in Friuli, Istria and other areas of the Croatian Adriatic coastline. His staff of 92, mostly members of the German and Ukrainian SS with killing experience gained in Operation Reinhard, was quickly expanded to combat the unrelenting partisan activity throughout the region. Globocnik's domain included Risiera di San Sabba, a large, disused and decrepit rice mill at Ratto della Pileria 43 in the Triestine suburb of San Sabba. Under his supervision it was converted into the only Nazi extermination camp in Italian territory. The camp was used to detain hostages, partisans and political prisoners, and as a collection and transit camp for Jews being deported to Nazi concentration camps. In October 1943, arrests started and the camp opened, staffed primarily by German and Ukrainian members of the SS under the command of SS-Sturmbannführer Christian Wirth, former commander of Belzec extermination camp. Wirth was killed by Yugoslav Partisans in Opatija, on 26 May 1944. He was replaced by Wirth's former deputy in Lublin and successor in Belzec, SS-Hauptsturmführer Gottlieb Hering. Hering was replaced by SS-Obersturmbannführer Dietrich Allers in August 1944. On 28 April 1945, the San Sabba camp ceased operating, and Waffen-SS troops set free the remaining inmates and demolished the gas chamber and incinerator building the next day, to destroy evidence of war crimes.

Over 25,000 Italian, Slovene, Croatian and Jewish civilians passed through the San Sabba camp, about 5,000 were killed there by various methods including gassing. Today the rice mill is an Italian National Memorial Site. The camp's commanders and collaborators were tried in Trieste in 1976, but their sentences were never carried out.

== German plans for the region ==
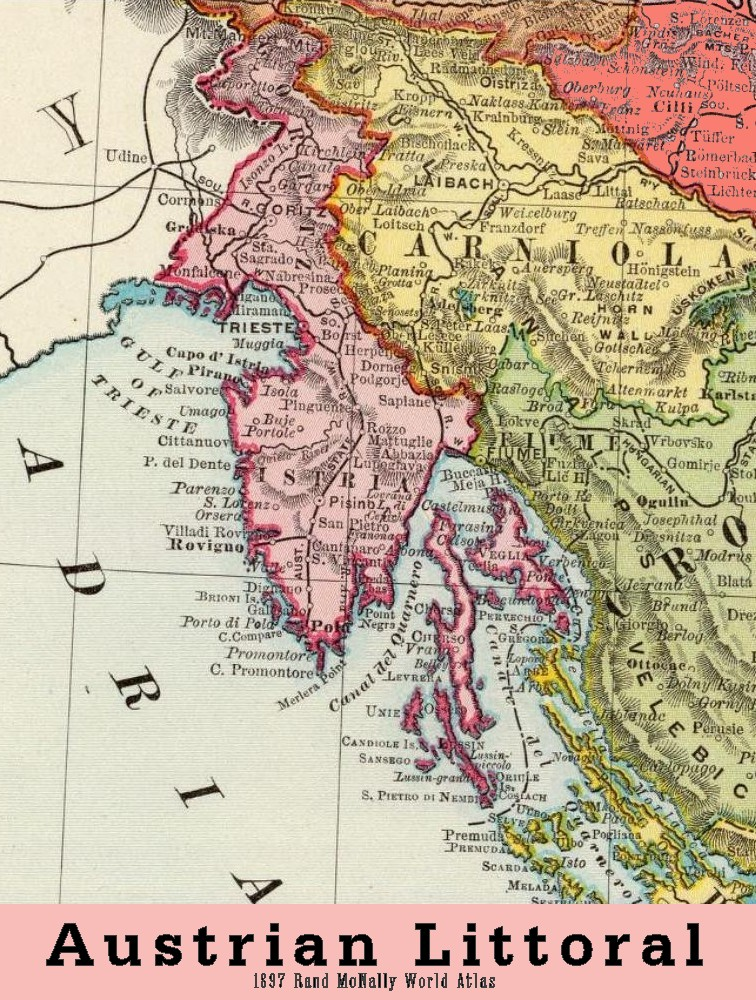
The Austrian littoral, with Gorizia and Istria in pink and Carniola in yellow

The ethnic and political re-definition of the Adriatic Littoral was considered during the war on a theoretical level. In a telegram sent on 9 September 1943 to foreign minister Ribbentrop, Gauleiter Rainer suggests the future establishment of Reich protectorates in Gorizia, Istria and Carniola, based on the subdivisions of the Austrian-Hungarian Empire. Initial German occupation policy, however, favored incorporating the area into the Reichsgau of Carinthia. The ethnic complexity of the region was to be used to minimize Italian influence, promote ethnic segmentation, and introduce Germandom as a stabilizing force. This strategy was based on an understanding of history of medieval Germany and the Habsburg monarchy, where the German lords and nobles were seen to have made the economic and administrative development of the region possible.

The ethno-social composition of Venezia-Giulia, Trieste, and Friuli was an important component to Germany's plans of occupation. The fascist government had lost support of the fragmented social groups throughout the region- and the collapse of the regime ushered in a period of disorientation amongst Italians. Nazi propaganda worked to create the illusion that the areas under the zone had Austro-Hungarian roots. Germany had plans to adopt the region as part of the Reichstag; however, they used the region's imperial-past to make connections with the Austro-Hungarian Empire. They named the zone "Adriatisches Küstenland" which bore reference to the Austro-Hungarian past as that had been the name used by the empire in reference to areas North of the Adriatic. This propaganda relates to the greater German plan as they intended to replace Rome with Vienna as the capital of the region. Germans believed that by referencing the prosperous past, they could evoke feelings of nostalgia that would ultimately forge cultural links between Vienna and Trieste to Germany.

Nazis employed more tactics of propaganda as seen in Italy through the creation of the Italian Social Republic (RSI), which effectively was a puppet-government that was under the control of Germany. With the RSI in control, Germany was able to enact extremely repressive laws which targeted specific ethnic and national groups, thereby spreading Nazi ideology throughout the zone. On 10 November 1943, Karl Lapper - head of SS Alpenland- issued an order which restricted all Italian radio and news sources within the zone, as they were substituted with German broadcasts of radio and news. By creating an extensive propaganda network that affected all parts of daily life, Germans were able to coerce support for the Nazi cause.

The future of the Province of Udine (Central and Western Friuli, today the provinces of Udine and Pordenone) was uncertain, but it is evident that a strategy similar to the other areas of the operational zone was to be pursued. In the previously mentioned telegram, Rainer emphasizes that the Friuli region is not ethnically Italian, but is composed of speakers of Friulian and, to a small extent German and Slovene. German scholars also presented supposed evidence for the "profound influence" German culture and language have had on the Friulians, including loan words and medieval place-names. Historical evidence was also found for the region of Friuli being a march land in the Carolingian and the early German empires, as well as for the role the German feudal lords played in the region, and its annexation to the Duchy of Carinthia in the late 10th century. It was thus concluded that the Friulians belonged to the German cultural field, and that their land was an ancient part of the German empire and has ever since been part of the German "vital space" (Lebensraum). These supposedly scholarly findings were echoed in German newspapers, although the Italian-language propaganda spread in the province of Udine emphasized the local population's ethnic distinction and regional autonomy, not pan-Germanism.

Several factions within the Nazi government also intended to extend the area of the two operational zones even further to the detriment of Italian territory. Joseph Goebbels wrote in his diary that the only "logical" border would be one that included the territories of the former Habsburg Kingdom of Lombardy–Venetia, expressing his hopes that Hitler's renewed friendship with Benito Mussolini would not deter him from this step:

We must not only get back South Tyrol, but I envisage the boundary line drawn south of Venice. Whatever was once an Austrian possession we must get back into our own hands. The Italians by their infidelity and treachery have lost any claim to a national state of the modern type.

He eventually managed to convince Hitler that this course of action should be undertaken, who agreed that Venice should be bound to the Reich in "some sort of loose confederation."

== Military operations in the zone ==
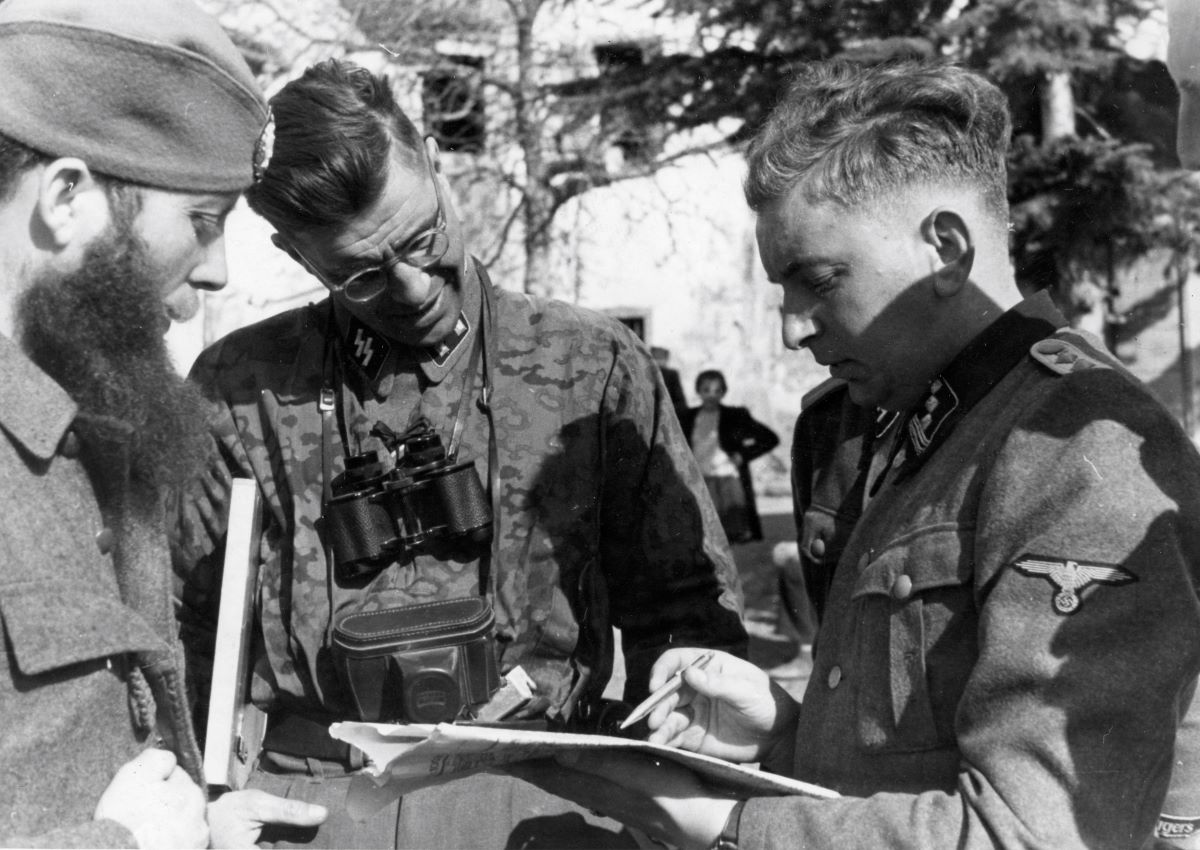
Chetnik Officer of the Dinara Division, SS-Sturmbannführer Ernst Lerch, and unidentified SS-Hauptsturmführer during the offensive against the 9th Corps, Slovene Littoral, March 1945.

Since an Allied landing in the area was anticipated by the Germans, and because of presence of large numbers of Italian, Slovene and Croatian partisans, OZAK also hosted a substantial German military contingent, commanded by General der Gebirgstruppe Ludwig Kübler. On 28 September 1944, these units were redesignated LXXXXVII Army Corps. Nearly every available armored vehicle, modern or obsolete, was pressed into service with Wehrmacht, Waffen-SS, Ordnungspolizei, or fascist Italian and Slovenian units.

On 30 April 1945, several thousand volunteers of the Italian anti-fascist Comitato di Liberazione Nazionale rose up against the Nazis. On 1 May, Globocnik was given command of a chaotic assortment of German and collaborationist troops converging on Trieste as they retreated from Italy and Yugoslavia. These units were immediately engaged by the Partisans' 4th Army before surrendering to the New Zealand 2nd Division commanded by NZ Lieutenant-General Sir Bernard Freyberg on the evening of 2 May. However, fighting continued between Josip Broz Tito's army and remnant Wehrmacht and collaborationist forces for several days. The Partisans began to withdraw from areas west of the Isonzo river on 15 May. On 11 June Yugoslav troops began to withdraw from Trieste.

== See also ==
- Slovenian National Defense Corps
- Adriatic Campaign of World War II
- Areas annexed by Nazi Germany
